= Leucopogon penicillatus =

Scientific classification
- Kingdom: Plantae
- Clade: Tracheophytes
- Clade: Angiosperms
- Clade: Eudicots
- Clade: Asterids
- Order: Ericales
- Family: Ericaceae
- Genus: Leucopogon
- Species: L. penicillatus

Binomial name
- Leucopogon penicillatus Stschegl.
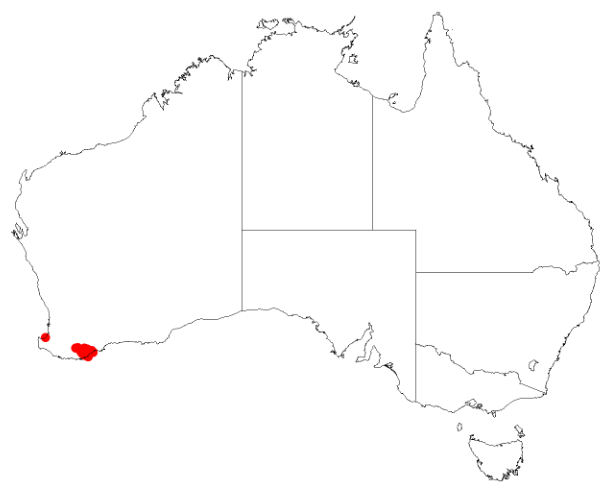
- Occurrence data from AVH

Synonyms
- Styphelia pendula (R.Br.) Spreng. Leucopogon pendulus R.Br. var. pendulus Leucopogon secundiflorus Sond.

Species of plant

Leucopogon penicillatus is a species of flowering plant in the heath family Ericaceae and is endemic to the south-west of Western Australia. It is an slender, erect, spreading shrub with egg-shaped to narrowly triangular leaves and white, bell-shaped, bearded flowers arranged in groups of between 3 and 13.

== Description ==
Leucopogon penicillatus is a slender, erect, spreading shrub that typically grows up to 90 m (300 ft) high and 70 cm (28 in) wide, its young stems densely hairy. The leaves are arranged spirally along the branches and are egg-shaped to narrowly triangular, 2.0–4.6 mm (0.079–0.181 in) long and 1.0–2.3 mm (0.039–0.091 in) wide on a petiole 0.2–0.6 mm (0.0079–0.0236 in) long. The flowers are erect and arranged on the ends of branches and in upper leaf axils in groups of between 3 and 13 with bracts 0.9–1.6 mm (0.035–0.063 in) long, and egg-shaped bracteoles 1.7–2.5 mm (0.067–0.098 in) long. The sepals are egg-shaped, 2.8–3.8 mm (0.11–0.15 in) long, and the petals are white and joined at the base, forming a bell-shaped tube 1.5–2.0 mm (0.059–0.079 in) long, with widely-spreading, bearded lobes 3.4–4.4 mm (0.13–0.17 in) long. The fruit is a drupe 1.8–2.1 mm (0.071–0.083 in) long.

== Taxonomy ==
Leucopogon penicillatus was first formally described in 1859 by Sergei Sergeyevich Sheglejev in the Bulletin de la Société impériale des naturalistes de Moscou from specimens collected by James Drummond. The specific epithet (penicillatus) means "possessing a small brush", referring to the petal lobes.

== Distribution and habitat ==
This leucopogon grows in mallee woodland and heath from near the Stirling Range to the Mount Manypeaks area and the Pallinup River in the Avon Wheatbelt, Esperance Plains, Jarrah Forest, Mallee, Swan Coastal Plain and Warren bioregions of south-western Western Australia.

== Conservation status ==
Leucopogon penicillatus is listed as "not threatened", by the Western Australian Government Department of Biodiversity, Conservation and Attractions.
