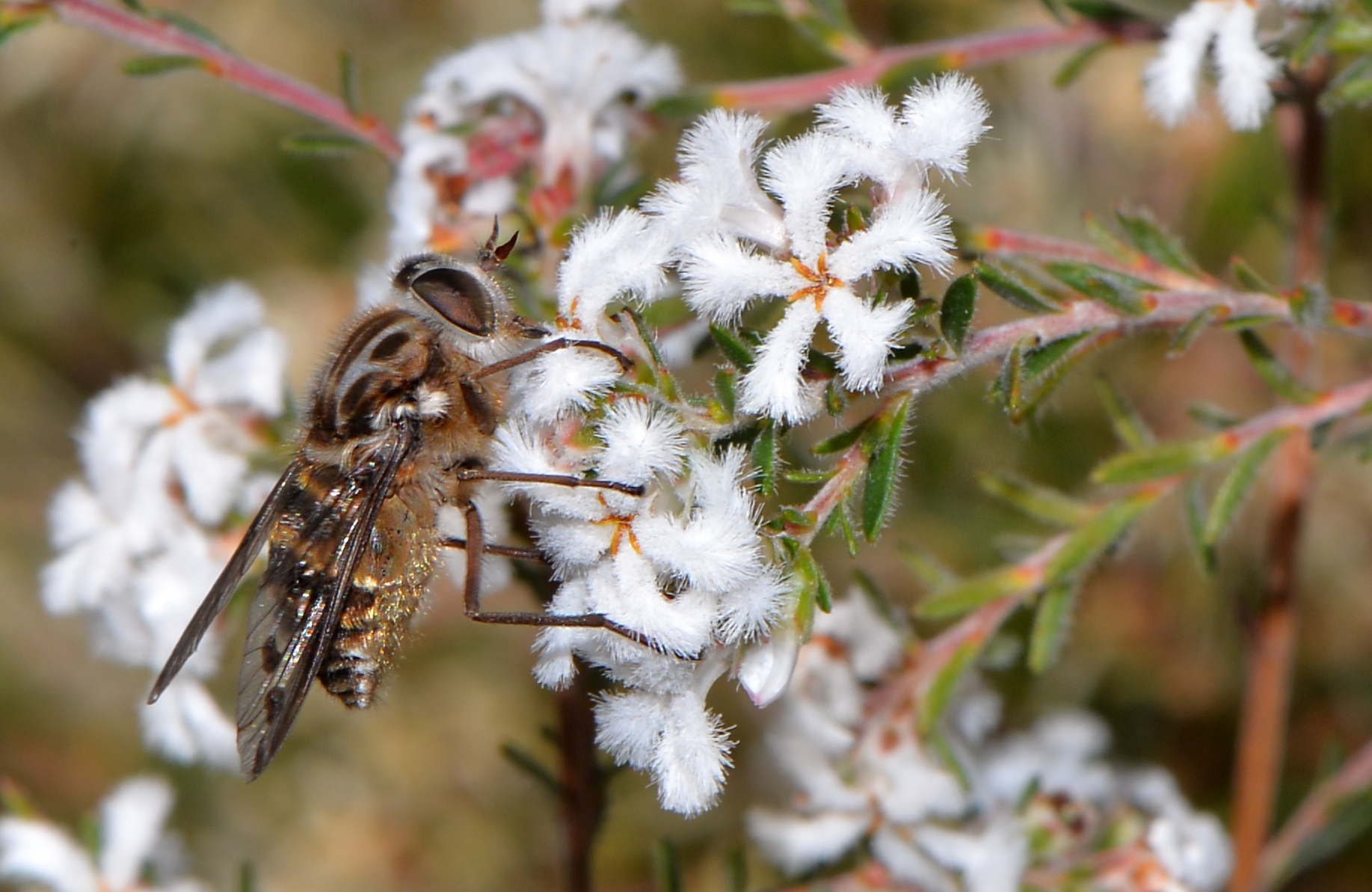

Scientific classification
- Kingdom: Plantae
- Clade: Tracheophytes
- Clade: Angiosperms
- Clade: Eudicots
- Clade: Asterids
- Order: Ericales
- Family: Ericaceae
- Genus: Leucopogon
- Species: L. pulchellus

Binomial name
- Leucopogon pulchellus Sond.
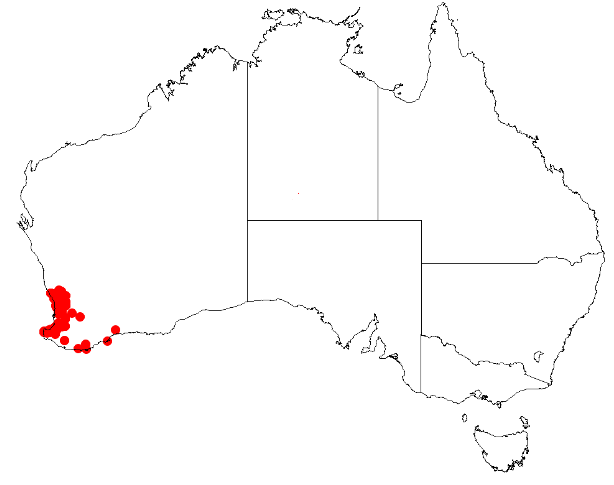
- Occurrence data from AVH

Synonyms
- ? Leucopogon glabratus Gand. ? Leucopogon morrisonii Gand.] Leucopogon triqueter Stschegl. Styphelia pulchella (Sond.) F.Muell.

= Leucopogon pulchellus =

Species of shrub

Leucopogon pulchellus, commonly known as beard-heath, is a species of flowering plant in the family Ericaceae, and is endemic to the south west of Western Australia. It is an erect or straggling shrub with erect, linear leaves and short, dense spikes of white, tube-shaped flowers.

== Description ==
Leucopogon pulchellus is an erect or straggling shrub that typically grows to a height of 0.15–1 m (5.9 in – 3 ft 3.4 in). Its leaves are erect, linear, mostly 4–8 mm (0.16–0.31 in) long, thick and slightly concave. The flowers are borne on the ends of branches or in upper leaf axils in short, dense spikes, with small bracts, and bracteoles less than half as long as the sepals and with a rounded tip. The sepals are about 2.6 mm (0.10 in) long, the petals white, about 4.5 mm (0.18 in) long and joined at the base, forming a short tube, the petal lobes longer than the petal tube.

== Taxonomy ==
Leucopogon pulchellus was first formally described in 1845 by Otto Wilhelm Sonder in Lehmann's Plantae Preissianae. The specific epithet, (pulchellus) is derived from the Latin adjective meaning "beautiful and little".

== Distribution and habitat ==
Beard-heath mainly grows in lateritic or granitic soil in the Avon Wheatbelt, Jarrah Forest, Swan Coastal Plain and Warren bioregions of south-western Western Australia.

== Conservation status ==
Leucopogon pulchellus is listed as "not threatened" by the Western Australian Government Department of Biodiversity, Conservation and Attractions.
