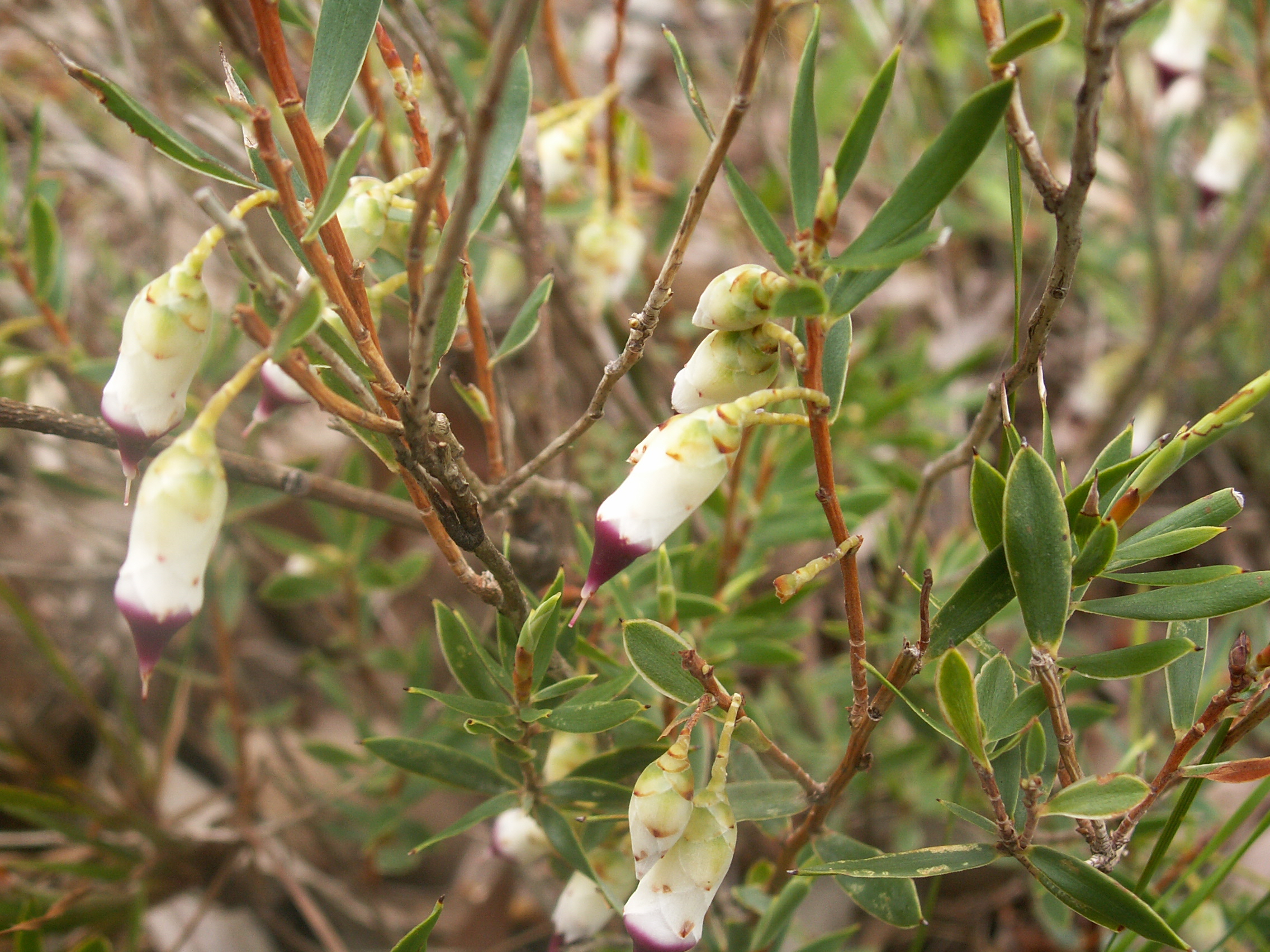
- Pearl flower Conostephium pendulum

Scientific classification
- Kingdom: Plantae
- Clade: Tracheophytes
- Clade: Angiosperms
- Clade: Eudicots
- Clade: Asterids
- Order: Ericales
- Family: Ericaceae
- Subfamily: Epacridoideae
- Tribe: Styphelieae
- Genus: Conostephium; Benth.

Type species
- Conostephium pendulum

Synonyms
- Conostephiopsis Stschegl.

= Conostephium =

Genus of flowering plants

Conostephium is a genus of flowering plants in the family Ericaceae and is endemic to the south-west of Western Australia. The name of the genus comes from Greek words, conos, "cone" and stephanos, "that which encircles, a crown or wreath", referring to the petal tube that encloses the stamens.

== Description ==
Plants in the genus Conostephium are small evergreen shrubs with small to medium-sized simple leaves. The flowers occur singly in the axils of the leaves, have 5 sepals, 5 corolla petals joined at their bases into a long corolla tube, and 5 stamens. The fruit is a more or less fleshy drupe.

== Taxonomy ==
The genus was first formally described in 1837 by George Bentham, and the first species described was C. pendulum. There are 12 species in the genus, 4 having been added recently. The most distinctive features of the genus are the corolla tube which is conical in the upper half, the tiny corolla lobes and very long anthers which are fully enclosed within the corolla tube. These 3 features are thought to be adaptations to buzz pollination. The genus is most closely related to Brachyloma and Stenanthera but those genera have saccate corolla tubes, much larger corolla lobes and shorter anthers which extend partially beyond the corolla tube.

After the description of C. pendulum in 1837, within ten years, two more were added - (C. minus and C. preissii). In 1859, the Russian botanist Sergei Sergeyevich Sheglejev described a new genus, Conostephiopsis in which he placed a new species (Conostephiopsis drummondii). At the same time, he transferred C. minus and C. preissii to the new genus, making Conostephium once more monotypic. In 1886, Bentham in Flora Australiensis grouped the two genera and added a fourth species (Conostephium roei). Much later, C. marchantiorum Strid (1986), C. uncinatum Moezel (1987) and C. magnum Cranfield (2002) were added. The latest additions were made (in 2013) by Michael Hislop, a botanical taxonomist at the Western Australian Herbarium

=== Species ===
The following is a list of Conostephium species accepted by the Australian Plant Census as at March 2022:

- Conostephium drummondii (Stschegl.) C.A.Gardner
- Conostephium hortiorum Hislop
- Conostephium laeve Hislop
- Conostephium magnum Cranfield
- Conostephium marchantiorum Strid
- Conostephium minus Lindl. – pink-tipped pearl flower
- Conostephium papillosum Hislop
- Conostephium pendulum Benth. – pearl flower
- Conostephium preissii Sond
- Conostephium prolatum Hislop
- Conostephium roei Benth.
- Conostephium uncinatum Moezel

== Distribution ==
All Conospermum species are endemic to the southwestern part of Western Australia.
