= Conostephium uncinatum =

Conservation status
- Priority Two — Poorly Known Taxa (DEC)

Scientific classification
- Kingdom: Plantae
- Clade: Tracheophytes
- Clade: Angiosperms
- Clade: Eudicots
- Clade: Asterids
- Order: Ericales
- Family: Ericaceae
- Genus: Conostephium
- Species: C. uncinatum

Binomial name
- Conostephium uncinatum Moezel

Species of flowering plant

Conostephium uncinatum is a species of flowering plant in the family Ericaceae and is endemic to the southwest of Western Australia. It is an erect shrub with clustered, narrowly oblong leaves with hooked tips, and spindle-shaped flowers.

== Description ==
Conostephium uncinatum is an erect shrub that typically grows to a height of 0.5–1.4 m (1 ft 8 in – 4 ft 7 in). Its leaves are clustered, narrowly oblong, 3.5–4.5 mm (0.14–0.18 in) long and about 0.5 mm (0.020 in) wide on a petiole 0.7 mm (0.028 in) long, with the edges rolled under and a hooked tip. The flowers are arranged singly in upper leaf axils and are 6–7 mm (0.24–0.28 in) long, 1.5 mm (0.059 in) wide and more or less sessile, the bracteoles nearly as long as the sepals. The sepals are 4.5–5.0 mm (0.18–0.20 in) long, papery and shiny, the petal tube spindle-shaped, 7.0–7.5 mm (0.28–0.30 in) and about 1 mm (0.039 in) wide. This species is similar to C. minus and C. marchantiorum but has leaves with the edges more tightly turned under, and shorter flower parts.

== Taxonomy and naming ==
Conostephium uncinatum was first formally described in 1987 by Paul G.van der Moezel in the journal Nuytsia from specimens he collected near Grass Patch in 1982. The specific epithet (uncinatum) means "hooked" and refers to the tip of the leaves.

== Distribution and habitat ==
This conostephium grows in deep, sandy soils between Grass Patch and Clyde Hill in the Mallee bioregion of south-western Western Australia.

== Conservation status ==
Conostephium uncinatum is listed as "Priority Two" by the Western Australian Government Department of Biodiversity, Conservation and Attractions, meaning that it is poorly known and from only one or a few locations.
