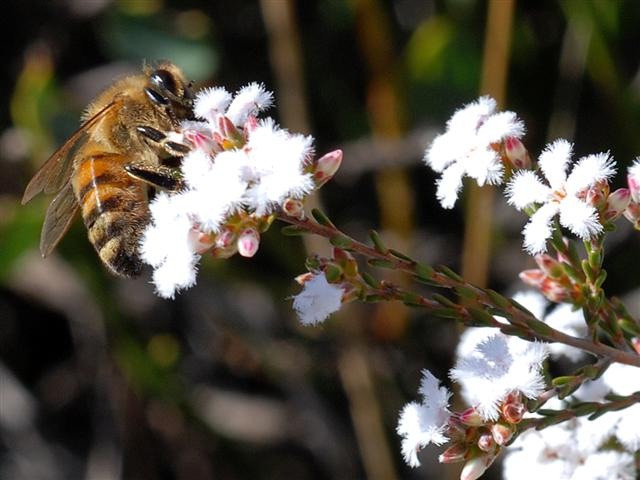

Scientific classification
- Kingdom: Plantae
- Clade: Tracheophytes
- Clade: Angiosperms
- Clade: Eudicots
- Clade: Asterids
- Order: Ericales
- Family: Ericaceae
- Genus: Leucopogon
- Species: L. obtusatus

Binomial name
- Leucopogon obtusatus Sond.
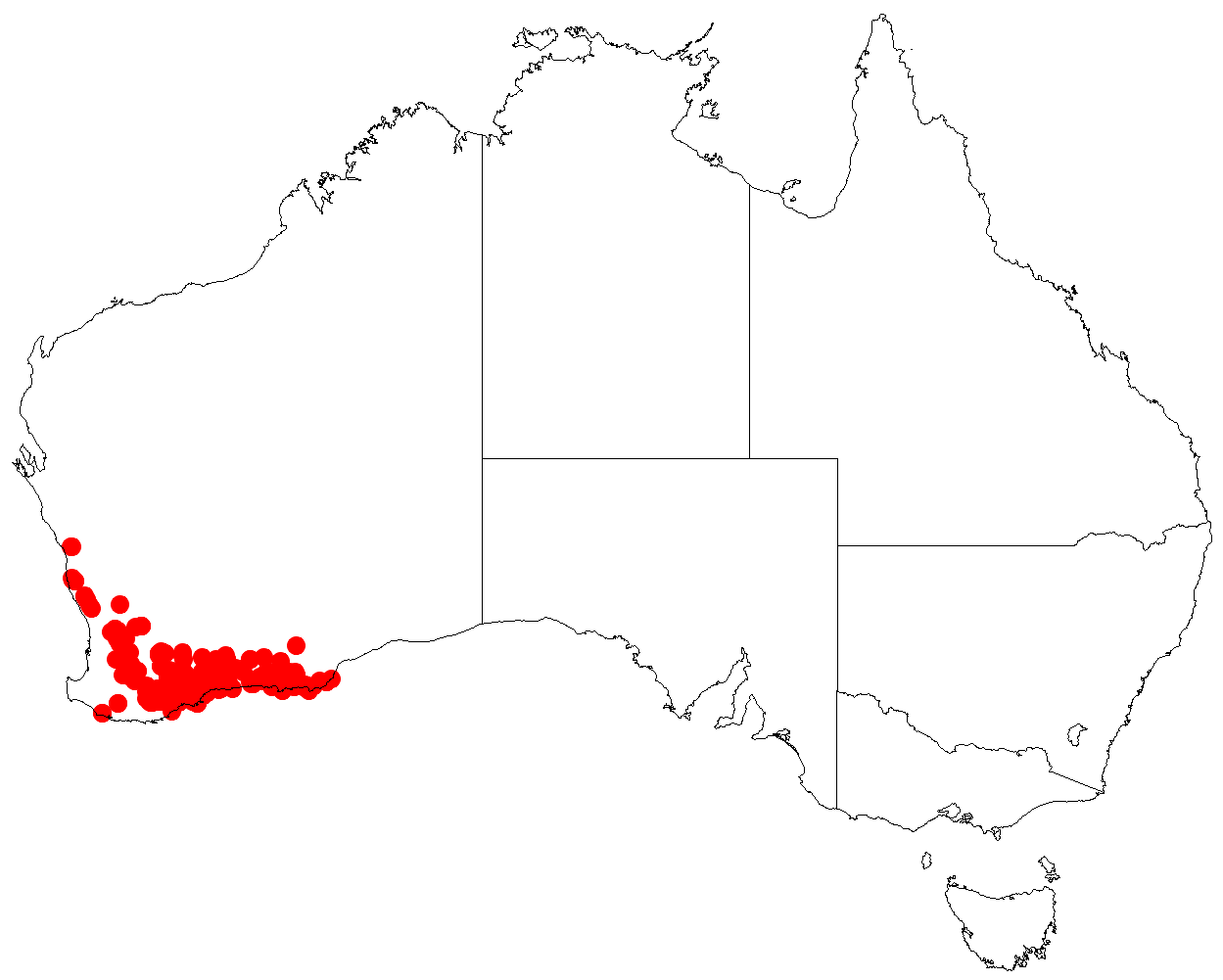
- Occurrence data from AVH

Synonyms
- Leucopogon brevifolius Stschegl.; Leucopogon minutifolius W.Fitzg.; Leucopogon obtusatus Sond. var. obtusatus; Styphelia obtusata (Sond.) F.Muell.; Styphelia brachycephala auct. non (DC.) F.Muell.

= Leucopogon obtusatus =

Species of plant

Leucopogon obtusatus is a species of flowering plant in the heath family Ericaceae and is endemic to the south-west of Western Australia. It is an erect shrub that typically grows to a height of 0.25–1 m (9.8 in – 3 ft 3.4 in). Its leaves are sessile, egg-shaped to oblong, overlap each other and are about 2 mm (0.079 in) long. The flowers are arranged in short, dense spikes on the ends of branches or in upper leaf axils with leaf-like bracts and broad bracteoles less than half as long as the sepals. The sepals are about 2 mm (0.079 in) long, the petals about 4 mm (0.16 in) long and joined at the base, the lobes shorter than the petal tube.

The species was first formally described in 1845 by Otto Wilhelm Sonder in Lehmann's Plantae Preissianae from specimens collected near York in 1839. The specific epithet (obtusatus) means "blunt-possessing", referring to the leaf tips.

Leucopogon obtusatus occurs in the Avon Wheatbelt, Esperance Plains, Jarrah Forest and Mallee bioregions of south-western Western Australia and is listed "not threatened" by the Western Australian Government Department of Biodiversity, Conservation and Attractions.
