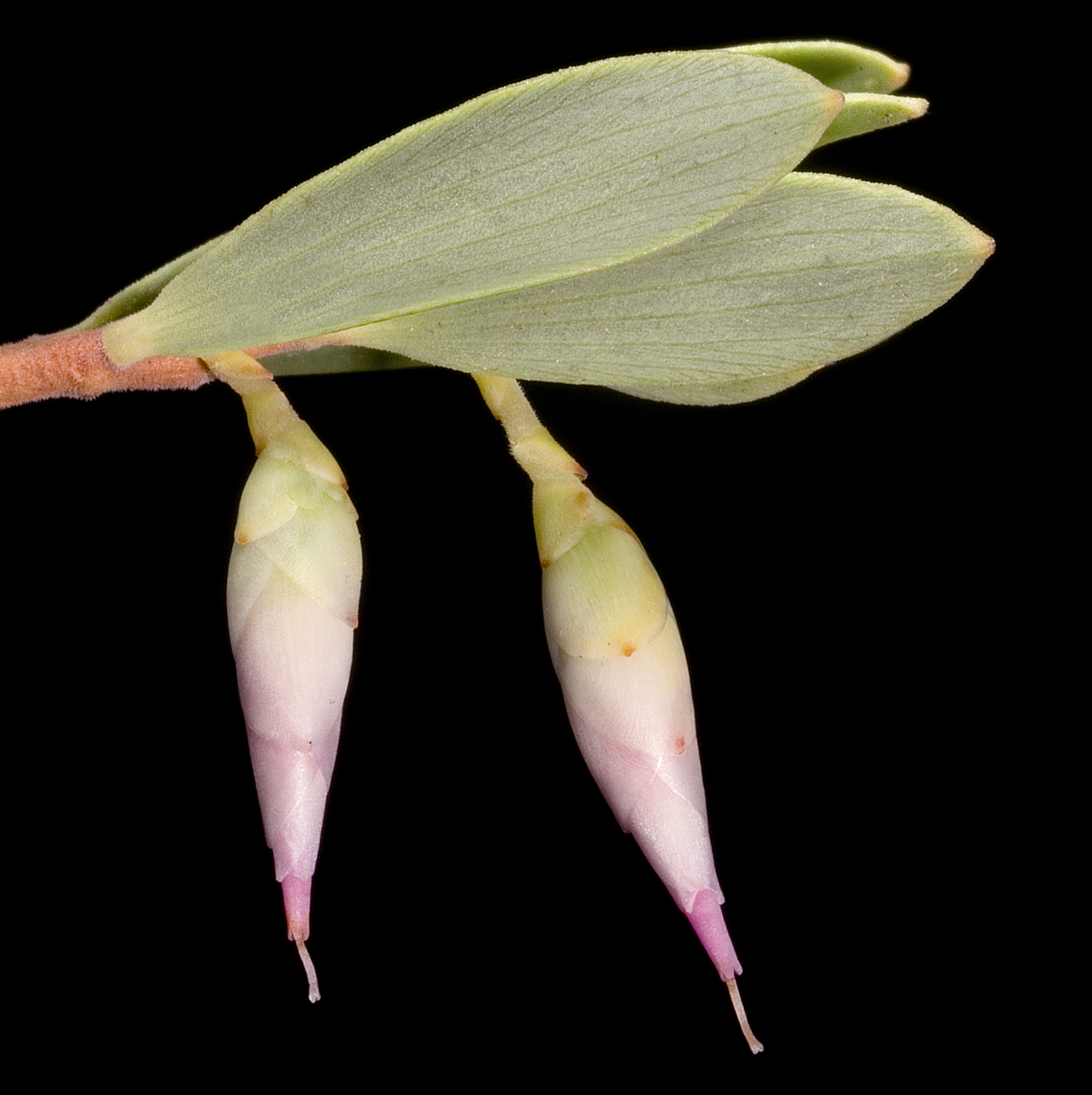

Scientific classification
- Kingdom: Plantae
- Clade: Tracheophytes
- Clade: Angiosperms
- Clade: Eudicots
- Clade: Asterids
- Order: Ericales
- Family: Ericaceae
- Genus: Conostephium
- Species: C. preissii

Binomial name
- Conostephium preissii Sond.

Synonyms
- Conostephiopsis preissii (Sond.) Stschegl.; Conostephium sp. Salt Lake (J.Buegge D7) WA Herbarium; Styphelia preissii (Sond.) F.Muell.

= Conostephium preissii =

Species of flowering plant

Conostephium preissii is a species of flowering plant in the family Ericaceae and is endemic to the southwest of Western Australia. It is an erect shrub with many stems, egg-shaped to oblong leaves and white and purplish to reddish-pink flowers.

== Description ==
Conostephium preissii is an erect shrub that typically grows to a height of 0.3–1.2 m (1 ft 0 in – 3 ft 11 in). Its leaves are egg-shaped with the narrower end towards the base to oblong and 13–19 mm (0.51–0.75 in) long with the edges rolled slightly downwards and often a small point on the tip. The flowers are about 8.5 mm (0.33 in) long, each flower on a downcurved peduncle 2–6 mm (0.079–0.236 in) long with many bracts and bracteoles almost as long as the sepals. The sepals are white, about 6.5 mm (0.26 in) long and the petals purplish to reddish-pink. The upper half of the ovary is glabrous, the stamens attached near the base of the petal tube. Flowering occurs from September to December.

== Taxonomy and naming ==
Conostephium preissii was first formally described in 1845 by Otto Wilhelm Sonder in Lehmann's Plantae Preissianae. The specific epithet, preissii, honours Ludwig Preiss.

== Distribution and habitat ==
This conostephium grows in heath on sandplains and winter-wet flats mainly on the coastal plain from near Eneabba to near Harvey, but also east of the Darling Scarp and further inland, in the Avon Wheatbelt, Coolgardie, Geraldton Sandplains, Jarrah Forest, Mallee and Swan Coastal Plain bioregions of south-western Western Australia.

== Conservation status ==
Conostephium preissii is listed as "not threatened" by the Government of Western Australia Department of Biodiversity, Conservation and Attractions.
