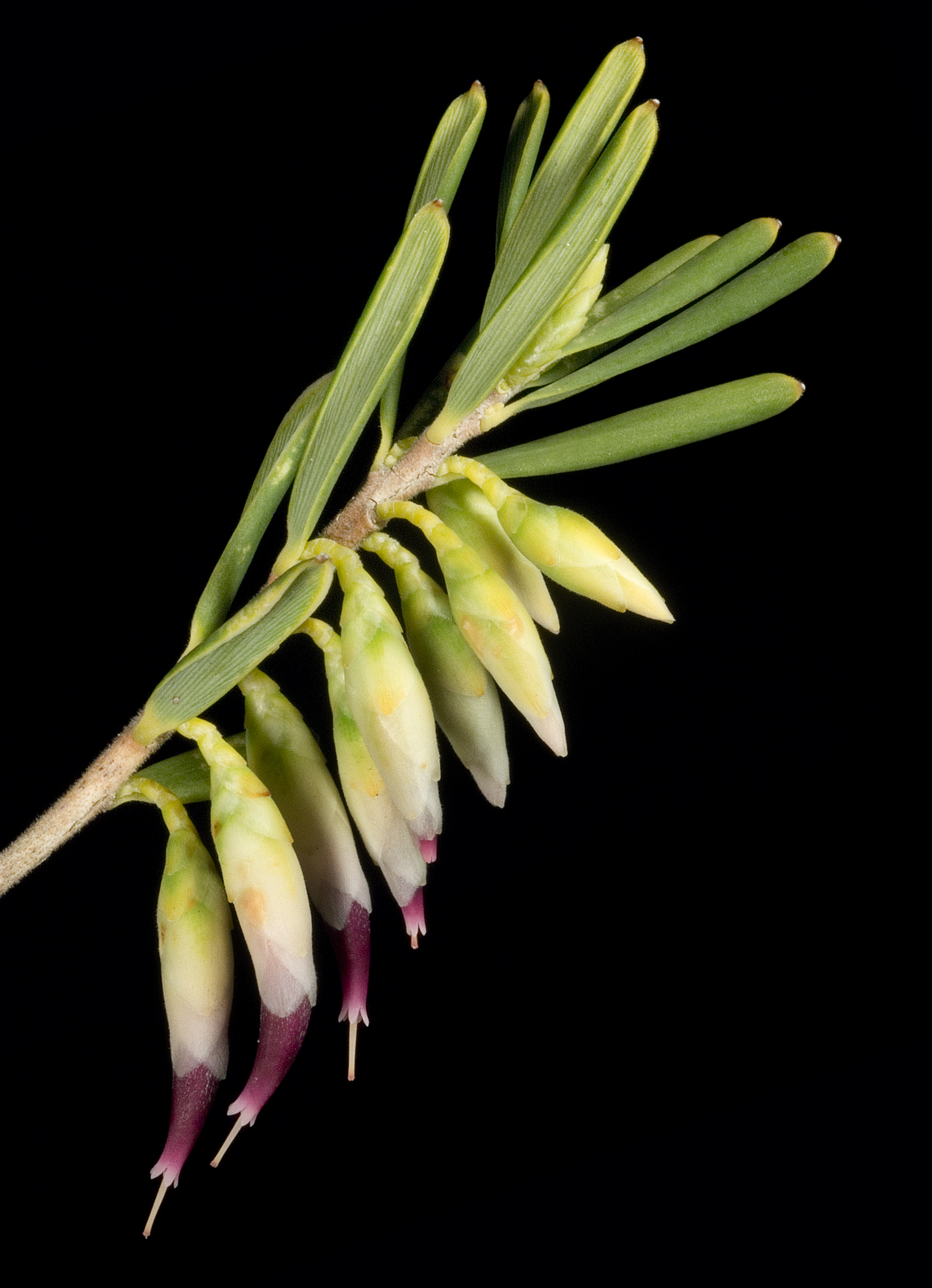

Scientific classification
- Kingdom: Plantae
- Clade: Tracheophytes
- Clade: Angiosperms
- Clade: Eudicots
- Clade: Asterids
- Order: Ericales
- Family: Ericaceae
- Genus: Conostephium
- Species: C. minus

Binomial name
- Conostephium minus Lindl.

Synonyms
- Conostephiopsis minor Stschegl. Conostephium nitens Lindl. ex B.D.Jacks. Conostephium pendulum Deless. Styphelia lindleyi F.Muell.

= Conostephium minus =

Species of flowering plant

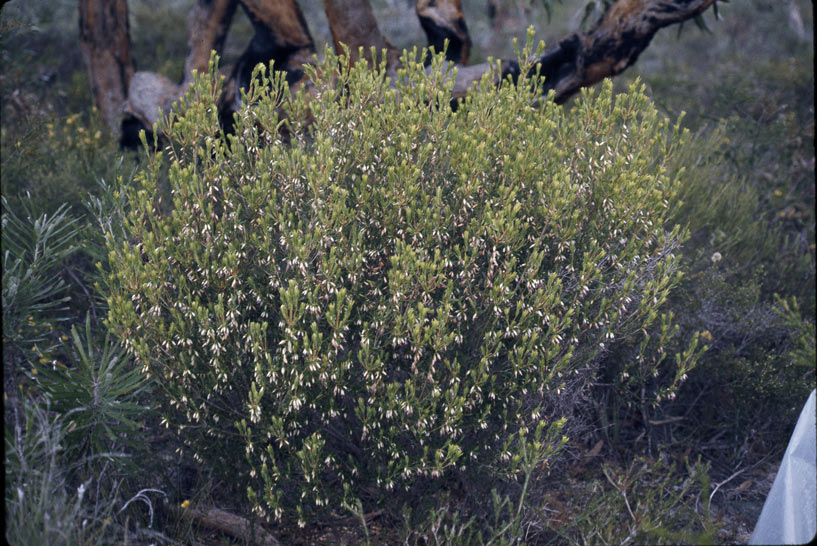
Habit near Cataby

Conostephium minus, common name pink-tipped pearl flower, is a species of flowering plant in the family Ericaceae and is endemic to the southwest of Western Australia. It is an erect shrub with linear leaves and white and purplish-pink flowers.

== Description ==
Conostephium minus is an erect shrub that typically grows to a height of 15–75 cm (5.9–29.5 in). Its leaves are linear, 13–19 mm (0.51–0.75 in) long with the edges rolled under and a small point on the tip. The flowers are about 8.5 mm (0.33 in) long, each flower on a peduncle about 2 mm (0.079 in) long with several bracts and bracteoles almost as long as the sepals. The sepals are white, the longest ones 5.6–7.2 mm (0.22–0.28 in) long and the petals purplish-pink and joined at the base with lobes 0.3–1 mm (0.012–0.039 in) long. The upper half of the ovary is softly-hairy, the stamens attached near the middle of the petal tube. Flowering occurs from August to October.

This species is similar to C. magnum, but that species has longer sepals and longer petal lobes.

== Taxonomy and naming ==
Conostephium minus was first formally described and named by John Lindley in 1839 in A Sketch of the Vegetation of the Swan River Colony. The specific epithet, minus, is a Latin adjective meaning "small".

== Distribution and habitat ==
Pink-tipped pearl flower grows on undulating sandplains on white/grey or yellow sands, between Regans Ford and Serpentine with an outlier near Collie, in the Geraldton Sandplains, Jarrah Forest and Swan Coastal Plain bioregions of south-western Western Australia.

== Conservation status ==
This species is listed as "not threatened" by the Government of Western Australia Department of Biodiversity, Conservation and Attractions.
