= Leucopogon atherolepis =

Scientific classification
- Kingdom: Plantae
- Clade: Tracheophytes
- Clade: Angiosperms
- Clade: Eudicots
- Clade: Asterids
- Order: Ericales
- Family: Ericaceae
- Genus: Leucopogon
- Species: L. atherolepis

Binomial name
- Leucopogon atherolepis Stschegl.
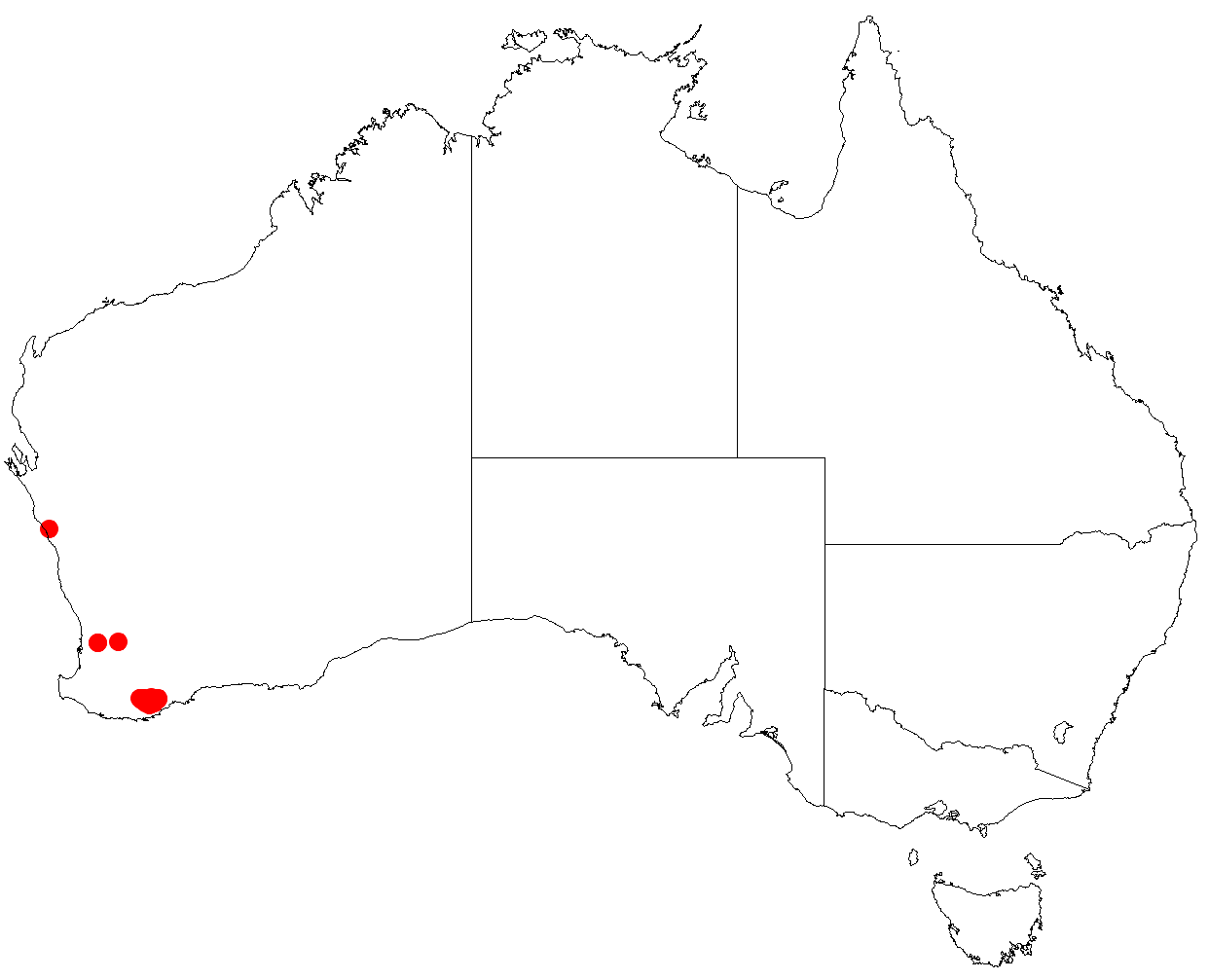
- Occurrence data from AVH

Synonyms
- Leucopogon atherolepis Stschegl. var. atherolepis; Leucopogon atherolepis var. densiflorus Benth.; Leucopogon grandiusculus F.Muell. nom. inval., pro syn.; Styphelia grandiuscula F.Muell.

Species of shrub

Leucopogon atherolepis is a species of flowering plant in the family Ericaceae and is endemic to the south-west of Western Australia. It is an erect shrub with linear leaves and white, tube-shaped flowers.

== Description ==
Leucopogon atherolepis is an erect shrub that typically grows to a height of 0.3–1 m (1 ft 0 in – 3 ft 3 in) and has long, straight stems and erect or spreading leaves with a sharply-pointed tip. The flowers are arranged near the ends of branches or in upper leaf axils, forming leafy panicles with bracts and bracteoles about 4 mm (0.16 in) long. The sepals are about 6.5 mm (0.26 in) long, the petals white and joined at the base forming a short tube with lobes nearly 6.5 mm (0.26 in) long. Flowering occurs from August to November.

== Taxonomy ==
Leucopogon atherolepis was first formally described in 1859 by Sergei Sergeyevich Sheglejev in the Bulletin de la Société impériale des naturalistes de Moscou. The specific epithet (atherolepis) is derived from Greek words meaning "the point of a weapon" and "a scale", referring to the sharply-pointed bracts, bracteoles and sepals.

== Distribution and habitat ==
This leucopogon grows on rocky hillsides, mainly in the Stirling Range National Park in the Esperance Plains and Mallee bioregions of south-western Western Australia.

== Conservation status ==
Leucopogon atherolepis is listed as "not threatened" by the Government of Western Australia Department of Biodiversity, Conservation and Attractions.
