= Glia (plant) =

Scientific classification
- Kingdom: Plantae
- Clade: Tracheophytes
- Clade: Angiosperms
- Clade: Eudicots
- Clade: Asterids
- Order: Apiales
- Family: Apiaceae
- Subfamily: Apioideae
- Tribe: Heteromorpheae
- Genus: Glia; Sond.

Genus of flowering plants

Glia is a genus of flowering plants in the family Apiaceae. It includes three species native to the southwestern Cape Provinces of South Africa.

- Glia decidua B.-E.van Wyk
- Glia pilulosa B.-E.van Wyk
- Glia prolifera (Burm.f.) B.L.Burtt
