= Conostephium drummondii =

Scientific classification
- Kingdom: Plantae
- Clade: Tracheophytes
- Clade: Angiosperms
- Clade: Eudicots
- Clade: Asterids
- Order: Ericales
- Family: Ericaceae
- Genus: Conostephium
- Species: C. drummondii

Binomial name
- Conostephium drummondii (Stschegl.) C.A.Gardner

Species of flowering plant

Conostephium drummondii is a species of flowering plant in the family Ericaceae and is endemic to the south-west of Western Australia. It is a slender, erect or spreading shrub that typically grows to a height of 0.3–1.5 m (1 ft 0 in – 4 ft 11 in). It is a variable species with multi-coloured flowers from March to July or from November to December.

The species was first formally described in 1859 by Sergei Sergeyevich Sheglejev who gave it the name Conostephiopsis drummondii in the Bulletin de la Société Impériale des Naturalistes de Moscou from specimens collected by James Drummond. In 1931 Charles Gardner changed the name to Conostephium drummondii in his Enumeratio Plantarum Australiae Occidentalis. The specific epithet (drummondii) honours the collectors of the type specimens.

Conostephium drummondii grows in a wide variety of habitats near the south coast and central southern parts of the Coolgardie, Esperance Plains and Mallee biogeographic regions of south-western Western Australia. It is listed as "not threatened" by the Western Australian Government Department of Biodiversity, Conservation and Attractions.
