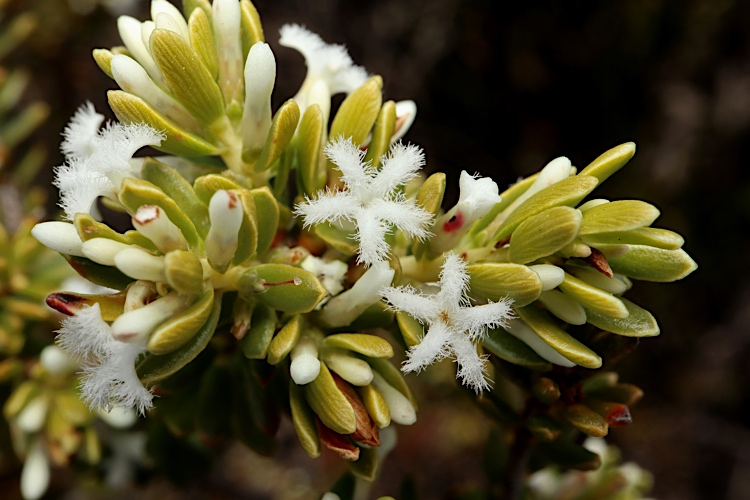

Scientific classification
- Kingdom: Plantae
- Clade: Tracheophytes
- Clade: Angiosperms
- Clade: Eudicots
- Clade: Asterids
- Order: Ericales
- Family: Ericaceae
- Genus: Styphelia
- Species: S. flavescens

Binomial name
- Styphelia flavescens (Sond.) F.Muell.
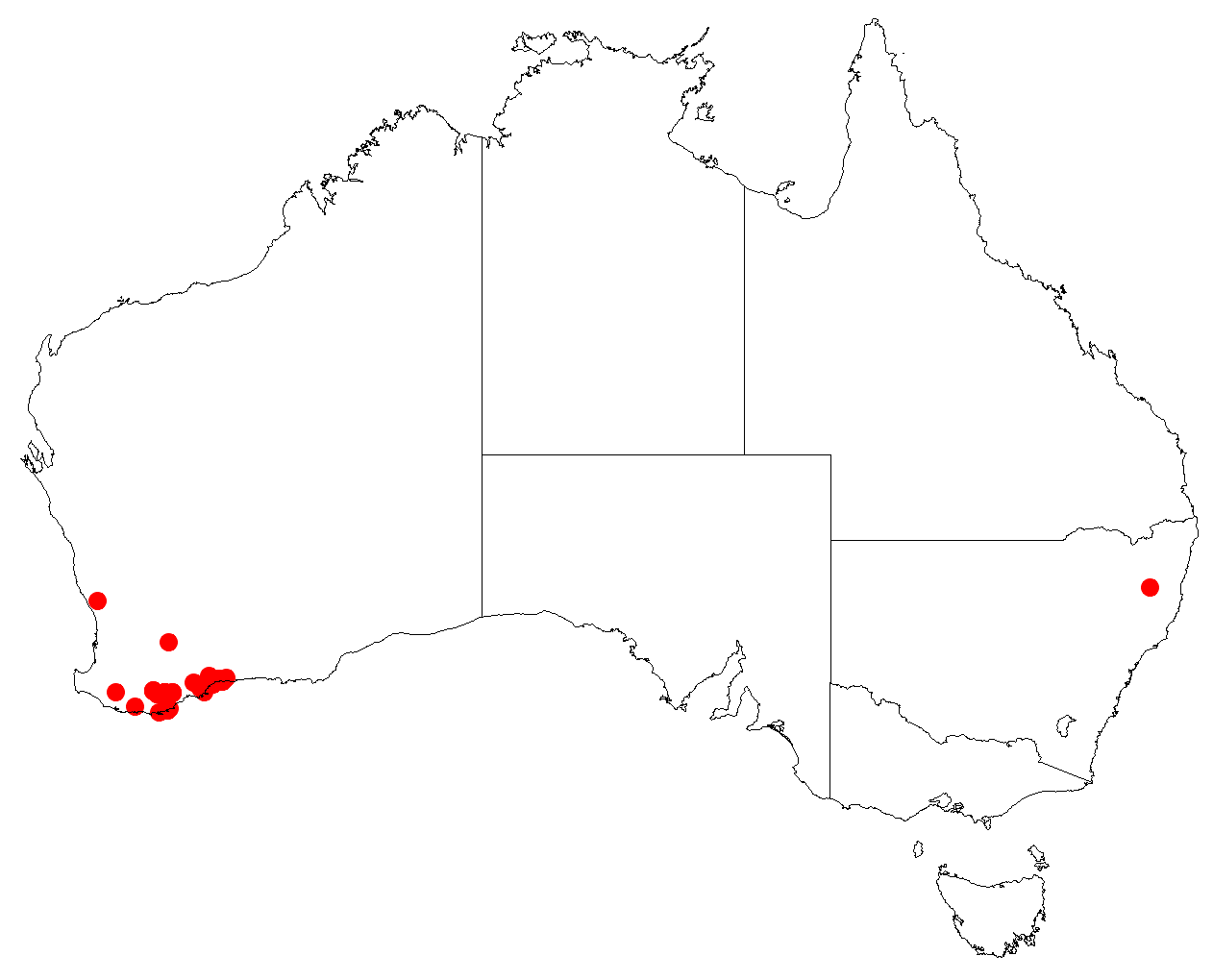
- Occurrence data from AVH

Synonyms
- Leucopogon flavescens Sond.

= Styphelia flavescens =

Species of plant

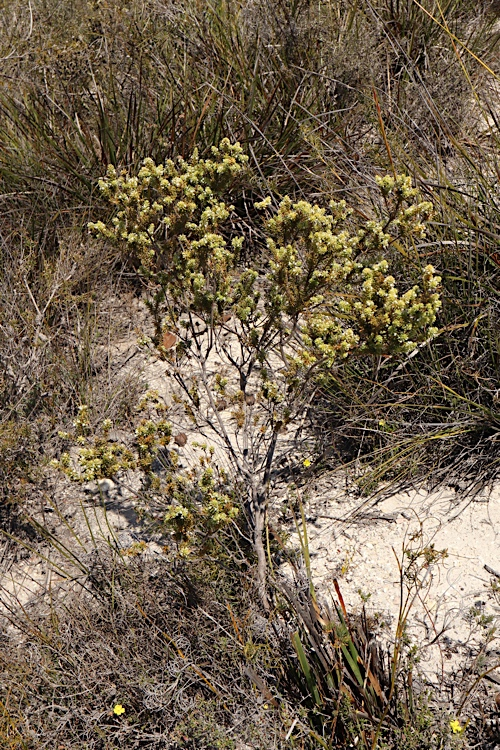
Habit near the Fitzgerald River National Park

Styphelia flavescens is a species of flowering plant in the heath family Ericaceae and is endemic to the south-west of Western Australia. It is a shrub with oblong leaves and white, tube-shaped flowers that are densely bearded on the inside.

== Description ==
Styphelia flavescens is an erect shrub that typically grows up to a height of 0.6–1.2 m (2 ft 0 in – 3 ft 11 in) and has minutely, softly-hairy branches. Its leaves are moderately crowded, oblong, 6–12 mm (0.24–0.47 in) long on a very short petiole. The flowers are arranged singly in leaf axils with bracteoles but no bracts at the base. The sepals are less than 2 mm (0.079 in) long, the petals white and densely hairy on the inside.

== Taxonomy and naming ==
This species was first formally described in 1845 by Otto Wilhelm Sonder in Johann Georg Christian Lehmann's Plantae Preissianae. In 1867, Ferdinand von Mueller transferred the species to Styphelia as S. flavescens in Fragmenta phytographiae Australiae. The specific epithet (flavescens) means "yellowish", referring to the leaves when dried.

== Distribution ==
This styphelia occurs in the Avon Wheatbelt, Esperance Plains and Jarrah Forest bioregions in the south-west of Western Australia.

== Conservation status ==
Styphelia flavescens is listed as "not threatened" by the Government of Western Australia Department of Biodiversity, Conservation and Attractions.
