= Leucopogon oppositifolius =

Scientific classification
- Kingdom: Plantae
- Clade: Tracheophytes
- Clade: Angiosperms
- Clade: Eudicots
- Clade: Asterids
- Order: Ericales
- Family: Ericaceae
- Genus: Leucopogon
- Species: L. oppositifolius

Binomial name
- Leucopogon oppositifolius Sond.
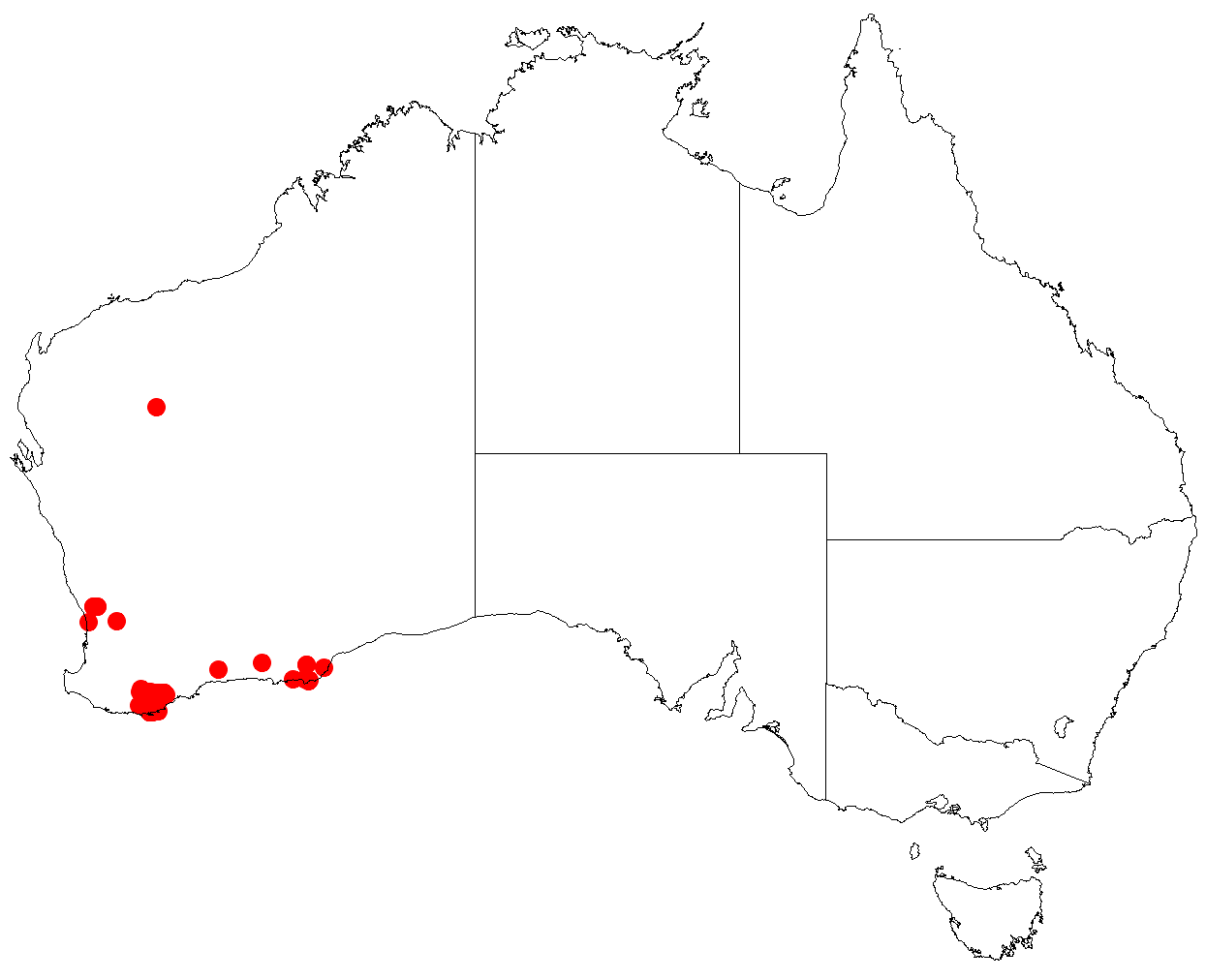
- Occurrence data from AVH

Synonyms
- Leucopogon oppositifolius Sond. var. oppositifolius; Leucopogon oppositifolius var. pubescens Sond.; Styphelia oppositifolia (Sond.) F.Muell.

Species of plant

Leucopogon oppositifolius is a species of flowering plant in the heath family Ericaceae and is endemic to the south of Western Australia. It is a slender, erect to spreading shrub that typically grows to a height of 15–80 cm (5.9–31.5 in). Its leaves are arranged in opposite pairs, narrowly linear to narrowly lance-shaped and 2–4 mm (0.079–0.157 in) long. The flowers are arranged in short spikes on the ends of branches with leaf-like bracts and narrow bracteoles about half as long as the sepals. The sepals are about 2 mm (0.079 in) long and lance-shaped, the petals about 4 mm (0.16 in) long and joined at the base, the lobes about the same length as the petal tube. Flowering mainly occurs from July to December.

The species was first formally described in 1845 by Otto Wilhelm Sonder in Lehmann's Plantae Preissianae from specimens collected near King George Sound in 1840. The specific epithet (oppositifolius) means "opposite-leaved".

Leucopogon oppositifolius occurs in the Avon Wheatbelt, Esperance Plains, Jarrah Forest and Mallee bioregions of southern Western Australia and is listed as "not threatened" by the Western Australian Government Department of Biodiversity, Conservation and Attractions.
