= Leucopogon gilbertii =

Scientific classification
- Kingdom: Plantae
- Clade: Tracheophytes
- Clade: Angiosperms
- Clade: Eudicots
- Clade: Asterids
- Order: Ericales
- Family: Ericaceae
- Genus: Leucopogon
- Species: L. gilbertii

Binomial name
- Leucopogon gilbertii Stschegl.
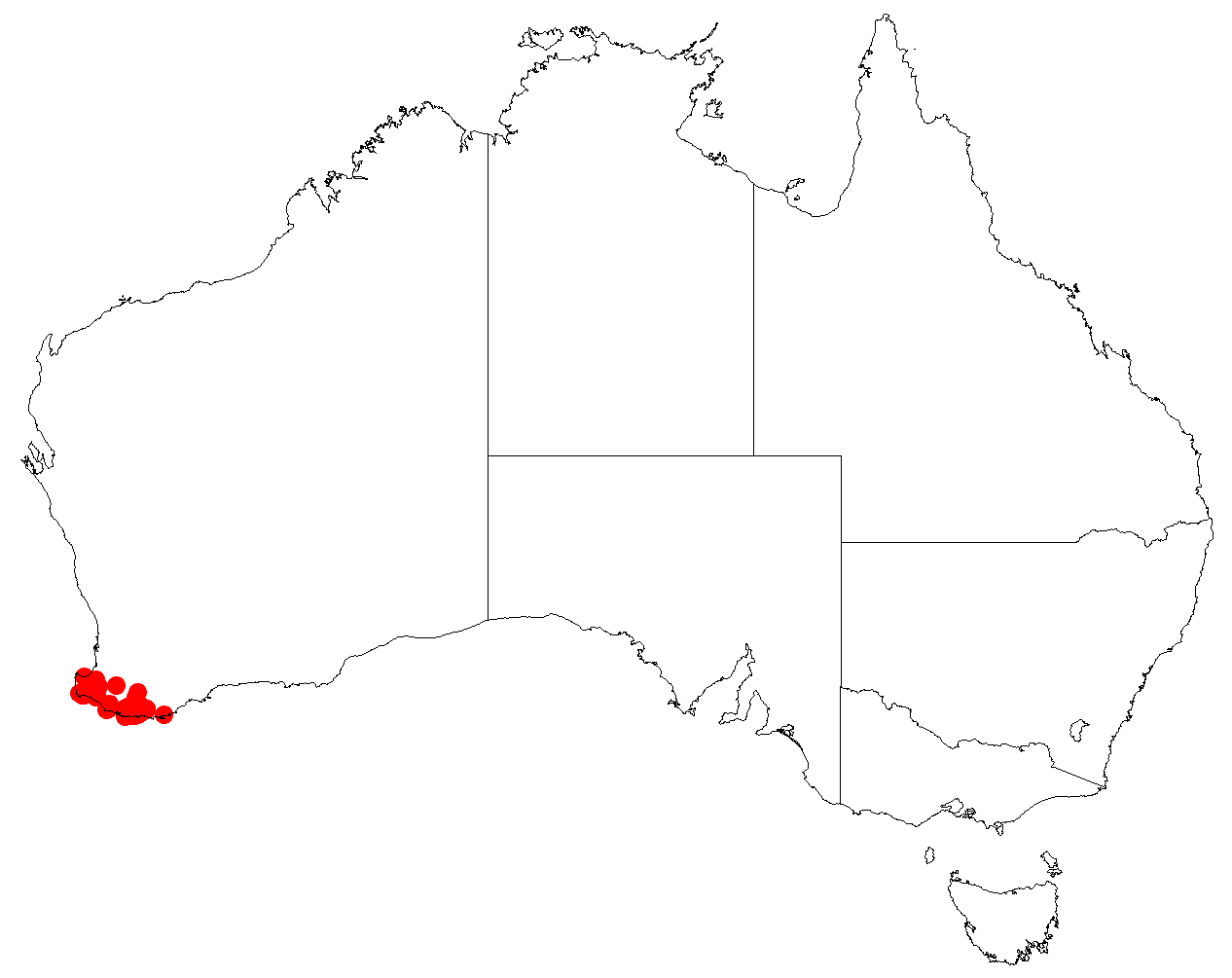
- Occurrence data from AVH

Synonyms
- Styphelia gilbertii (Stschegl.) F.Muell.; Styphelia multiflora (R.Br.) F.Muell. nom. illeg.

Species of shrub

Leucopogon gilbertii is a species of flowering plant in the heath family Ericaceae and is endemic to the south-west of Western Australia. It is a slender shrub with linear to lance-shaped leaves and spikes of tube-shaped white flowers on the ends of branches and in leaf axils.

== Description ==
Leucopogon gilbertii is a slender, glabrous shrub that typically grows to a height of 0.2–1 m (7.9 in – 3 ft 3.4 in). The leaves are linear to lance-shaped tapering to a short, hard point, and up to about 12 mm (0.47 in) long. The flowers are small, arranged in short, dense spikes on the ends of branches or in upper leaf axils with bracts and striated bracteoles about half as long as the sepals. The sepals are hairy, about 1.6 mm (0.063 in) long and the petals white and 3.2 mm (0.13 in) long, the lobes longer than the petal tube.

== Taxonomy ==
Leucopogon gilbertii was first formally described in 1859 by Sergei Sergeyevich Sheglejev in the Bulletin de la Société impériale des naturalistes de Moscou from specimens collected by John Gilbert. The specific epithet (gilbertii) honour the collector of the type specimens.

== Distribution and habitat ==
This leucopogon grows in peaty sand in winter-wet places and in swamps in the Jarrah Forest and Warren bioregions of south-western Western Australia.

== Conservation status ==
Leucopogon gilbertii is listed as "not threatened" by the Government of Western Australia Department of Biodiversity, Conservation and Attractions.
