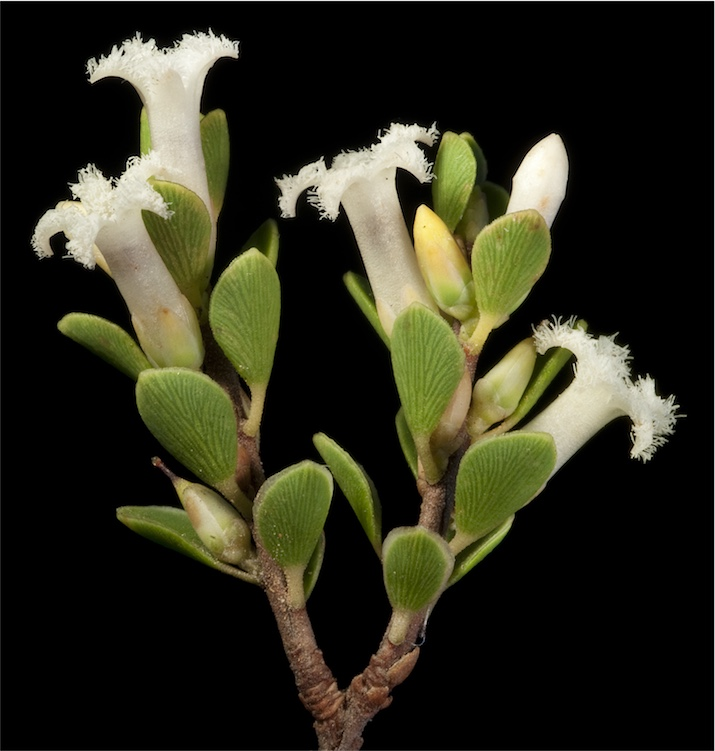

Scientific classification
- Kingdom: Plantae
- Clade: Tracheophytes
- Clade: Angiosperms
- Clade: Eudicots
- Clade: Asterids
- Order: Ericales
- Family: Ericaceae
- Genus: Styphelia
- Species: S. lissanthoides

Binomial name
- Styphelia lissanthoides (F.Muell.) F.Muell.
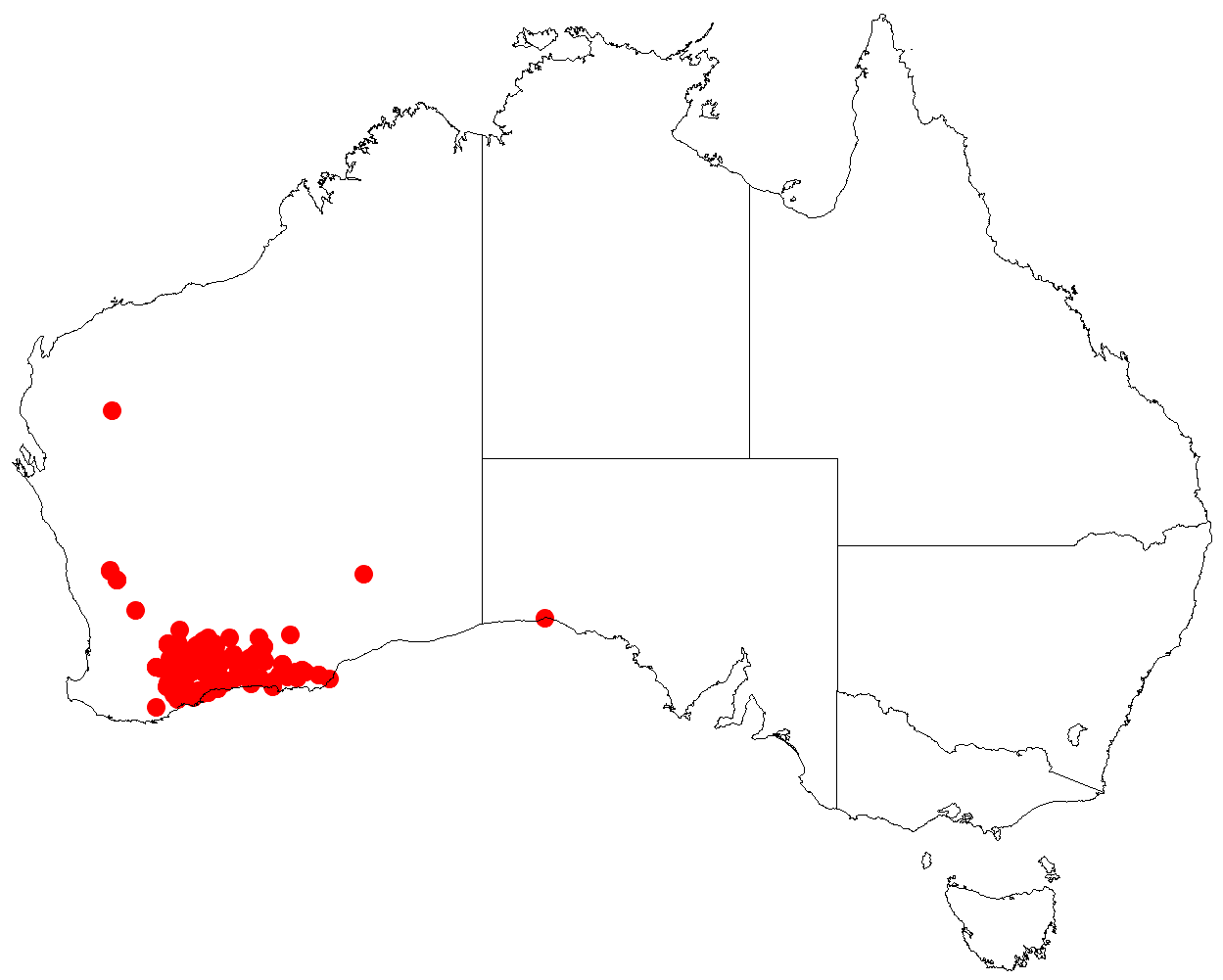
- Occurrence data from AVH

Synonyms
- Leucopogon lissanthoides F.Muell.; Leucopogon cuneifolius Stschegl.

= Styphelia lissanthoides =

Species of plant

Styphelia lissanthoides is a species of flowering plant in the heath family Ericaceae and is endemic to the south of Western Australia. It is an erect, bushy shrub with egg-shaped to lance-shaped leaves with the narrower end towards the base, and white, tube-shaped flowers arranged singly or in pairs in leaf axils.

== Description ==
Styphelia lissanthoides is an erect, bushy shrub that typically grows to a height of about 1 m (3 ft 3 in) and has more or less glabrous branches. Its leaves are egg-shaped to lance-shaped leaves with the narrower end towards the base and mostly about 6 mm (0.24 in) long on a distinct petiole, and have fine veins. The flowers are borne singly or in pairs on a very short peduncle. There are very small bracts and bracteoles scarcely one-third as long as the sepals. The sepals are about 2.0 mm (0.079 in) long and the petals are 5.4 mm (0.21 in) long and joined at the base to form a tube, the lobes much shorter than the petal tube.

== Taxonomy ==
This species was first described in 1864 by Ferdinand von Mueller who gave it the name Leucopogon lissanthoides in his Fragmenta Phytographiae Australiae from a specimen collected by George Maxwell near a tributary of the Phillips River. In 1867, von Mueller transferred the species to Styphelia as S. lissanthoides in later volume of the same book. The specific epithet (lissanthoides) means "Lissanthe-like".

This species was first formally described in 1859 as Leucopogon cuneifolius by Sergei Sergeyevich Sheglejev in the Bulletin de la Société impériale des naturalistes de Moscou. The specific epithet (cuneifolius) means "wedge-leaved".

== Distribution ==
This styphelia occurs in the Avon Wheatbelt, Coolgardie, Esperance Plains and Mallee bioregions of south-western Western Australia.

== Conservation status ==
Styphelia lissanthoides is listed as "not threatened" by the Western Australian Government Department of Biodiversity, Conservation and Attractions.
