= Salix alatavica =

Scientific classification
- Kingdom: Plantae
- Clade: Tracheophytes
- Clade: Angiosperms
- Clade: Eudicots
- Clade: Rosids
- Order: Malpighiales
- Family: Salicaceae
- Genus: Salix
- Species: S. alatavica

Binomial name
- Salix alatavica Kar. ex Stschegl.

Synonyms
- Salix spissa Andersson

Species of willow

Salix alatavica is a small shrub from the genus of willow (Salix). It is native to mountainous slopes in Asia, in Kazakhstan, southern Russia, Mongolia, and northern China.

== Taxonomy ==
Salix alatavica is a species of willow (Salix), in the willow family Salicaceae. It is assigned to the section Salix sect. Glaucae. Serge S. Stscheglejew first described the species in 1854. The generic name Salix comes from Latin and was already used by the Romans for various types of willow. Another theory is that the word is derived from a Celtic language, sal meaning 'near' and lis meaning 'water', alluding to the habitat. Grigori Silytsch Karelin first collected S. alatavica in 1842 in the Alatau mountains, together with Ivan Petrovich Kirilov he collected it again in the same region in 1844.

== Description ==
Salix alatavica is a shrub up to 1.5 meters high with initially purple-red and pubescent, later brown or chestnut-brown, glabrous branches. The buds are reddish, shiny and have a pointed apex. The leaves have small, ovate, membranous and caducous stipules. The petiole is 2 to 5 millimetres long, covered in hairs or glabrous. The leaf blade is 3 to 6 cm long, 2 to 2.5 cm wide, oblong-ovate or elliptical, with an oblique and short pointed tip, a wedge-shaped leaf base and a glandular serrulate leaf margin. The upper side of the leaf is green, the underside greenish; initially the leaves are silky pubescent and later glabrous.

The inflorescences are catkins appearing on the sides of the branches or clustered towards their ends, which are 4 to 5 centimetres long, 1 to 1.5 centimetres in diameter, with a grey-tomentose peduncle subtended with two to four leaflets. The bracts are brownish, black towards the tip, oblong in shape and covered in a tomentose indumentum. Male flowers have a nectar gland facing the stem axis, two stamens with distinct filaments covered in woolly grey hairs and yellow, spherical anthers. Female flowers are covered in woolly grey hairs, have short stipules, also have a nectar gland facing the stem axis, and have a stigma with two clefts in it. The ovary is elongated-ovoid-shaped, and usually bent. Female catkins elongate when they are in fruit.

== Distribution and ecology ==
The natural range is in western Mongolia, southern central Siberia in Russia and in the west of the Xinjiang Autonomous Region in China. In China it grows on mountain slopes at altitudes of 2700 to 2800 meters. It flowers in June and July in China, with the fruit ripening in July and August. Flowering is simultaneous with the growth of new leaves (coetaneous) or serotinous (after the leaves shoot).
