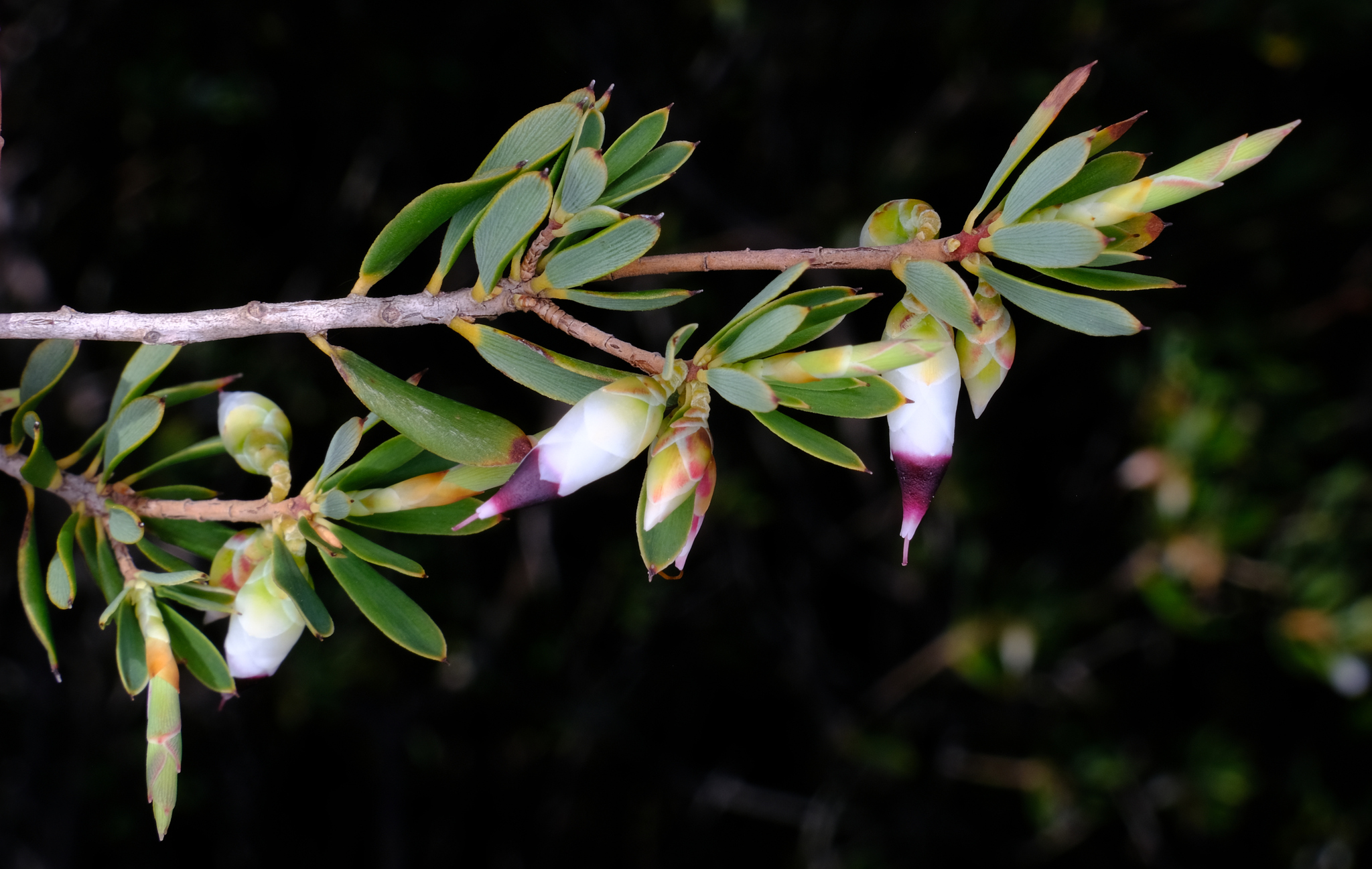

Conservation status
- Priority Two — Poorly Known Taxa (DEC)

Scientific classification
- Kingdom: Plantae
- Clade: Tracheophytes
- Clade: Angiosperms
- Clade: Eudicots
- Clade: Asterids
- Order: Ericales
- Family: Ericaceae
- Genus: Conostephium
- Species: C. prolatum

Binomial name
- Conostephium prolatum Hislop

= Conostephium prolatum =

Species of flowering plant

Conostephium prolatum is a species of flowering plant in the family Ericaceae and is endemic to the south of Western Australia. It is an erect shrub usually with narrowly egg-shaped or narrowly triangular leaves with the narrower end toward the base, and more or less pendulous, spindle-shaped, cream to straw-coloured and dark purple flowers.

== Description ==
Conostephium prolatum is an erect shrub that typically grows up to 1 m (3 ft 3 in) high and wide, and has many branches from near its base. The leaves are narrowly egg-shaped or narrowly triangular with the narrower end toward the base, sometimes linear, 10–22 mm (0.39–0.87 in) long and 1.8–4.2 mm (0.071–0.165 in) wide on a petiole 0.8–1.3 mm (0.031–0.051 in) long. The upper surface of the leaves is glabrous and shiny, the lower surface more or less glabrous but paler. The flowers are more or less pendulous with 6 to 10 broadly egg-shaped floral bracts, the upper bracts 1.7–2.2 mm (0.067–0.087 in) long, and egg-shaped or broadly egg-shaped, cream to straw-coloured bracteoles 4.0–5.6 mm (0.16–0.22 in) long and 2.8–3.5 mm (0.11–0.14 in) wide. The sepals are egg-shaped or narrowly egg-shaped, 4.8–7.5 mm (0.19–0.30 in) long, the petal tube spindle-shaped and 7.5–9.5 mm (0.30–0.37 in) long and dark purple, the lobes white. Flowering occurs from August to October and the fruit is oval or broadly oval and 4.5–5.8 mm (0.18–0.23 in) long.

== Taxonomy and naming ==
Conostephium prolatum was first formally described in 2013 by Michael Hislop in the journal Nuytsia from specimens he collected in the south of the Fitzgerald River National Park in 2011. The specific epithet (prolatum) means "lengthened" or "extended", referring to the leaves, which are longer than those of the similar C. roei.

== Distribution and habitat ==
This species usually grows in near-coastal heath and is only known from the south-east of the Fitzgerald National Park in the Esperance Plains bioregion of southern Western Australia.

== Conservation status ==
This conostephium is listed as "Priority Two" by the Western Australian Government Department of Biodiversity, Conservation and Attractions, meaning that it is poorly known and from only one or a few locations.
