= Styphelia psilopus =

Conservation status
- Priority Two — Poorly Known Taxa (DEC)

Scientific classification
- Kingdom: Plantae
- Clade: Tracheophytes
- Clade: Angiosperms
- Clade: Eudicots
- Clade: Asterids
- Order: Ericales
- Family: Ericaceae
- Genus: Styphelia
- Species: S. psilopus

Binomial name
- Styphelia psilopus (Stschegl.) Hislop, Crayn & Puente-Lel.
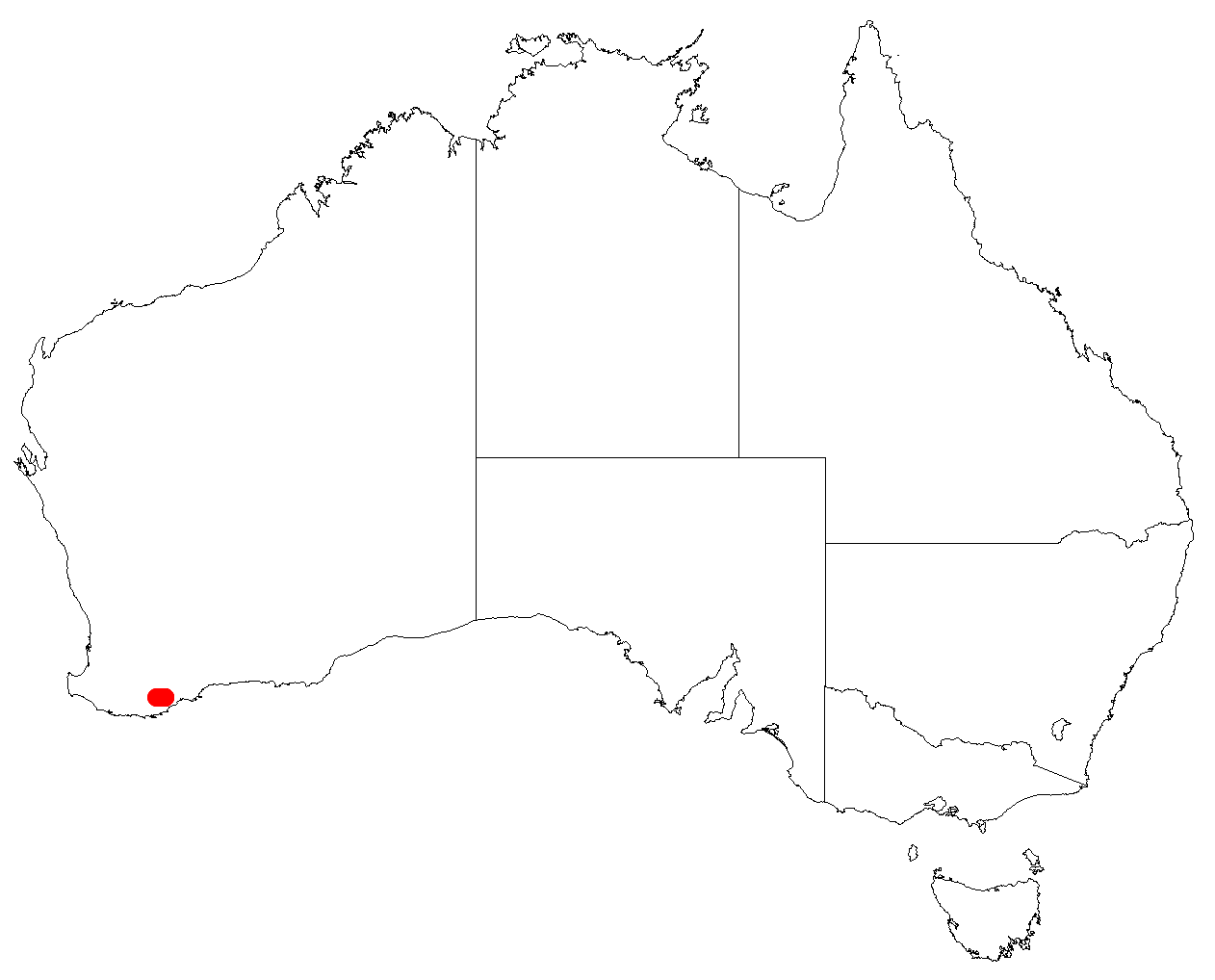
- Occurrence data from AVH

Synonyms
- Leucopogon psilopus Stschegl.

Species of plant

Styphelia psilopus is a species of flowering plant in the heath family Ericaceae and is endemic to the Stirling Range in the south-west of Western Australia. The species was first formally described in 1859 by Sergei Sergeyevich Sheglejev who gave it the name Leucopogon psilopus in the Bulletin de la Société impériale des naturalistes de Moscou, from specimens collected by James Drummond. In 2020, Michael Hislop, Darren Crayn and Caroline Puente-Lelievre transferred the species to Styphelia as S. psilopus in Australian Systematic Botany. The specific epithet (psilopus) means "glabrous foot". It is listed as "Priority Two" by the Western Australian Government Department of Biodiversity, Conservation and Attractions, meaning that it is poorly known and from only one or a few locations.
