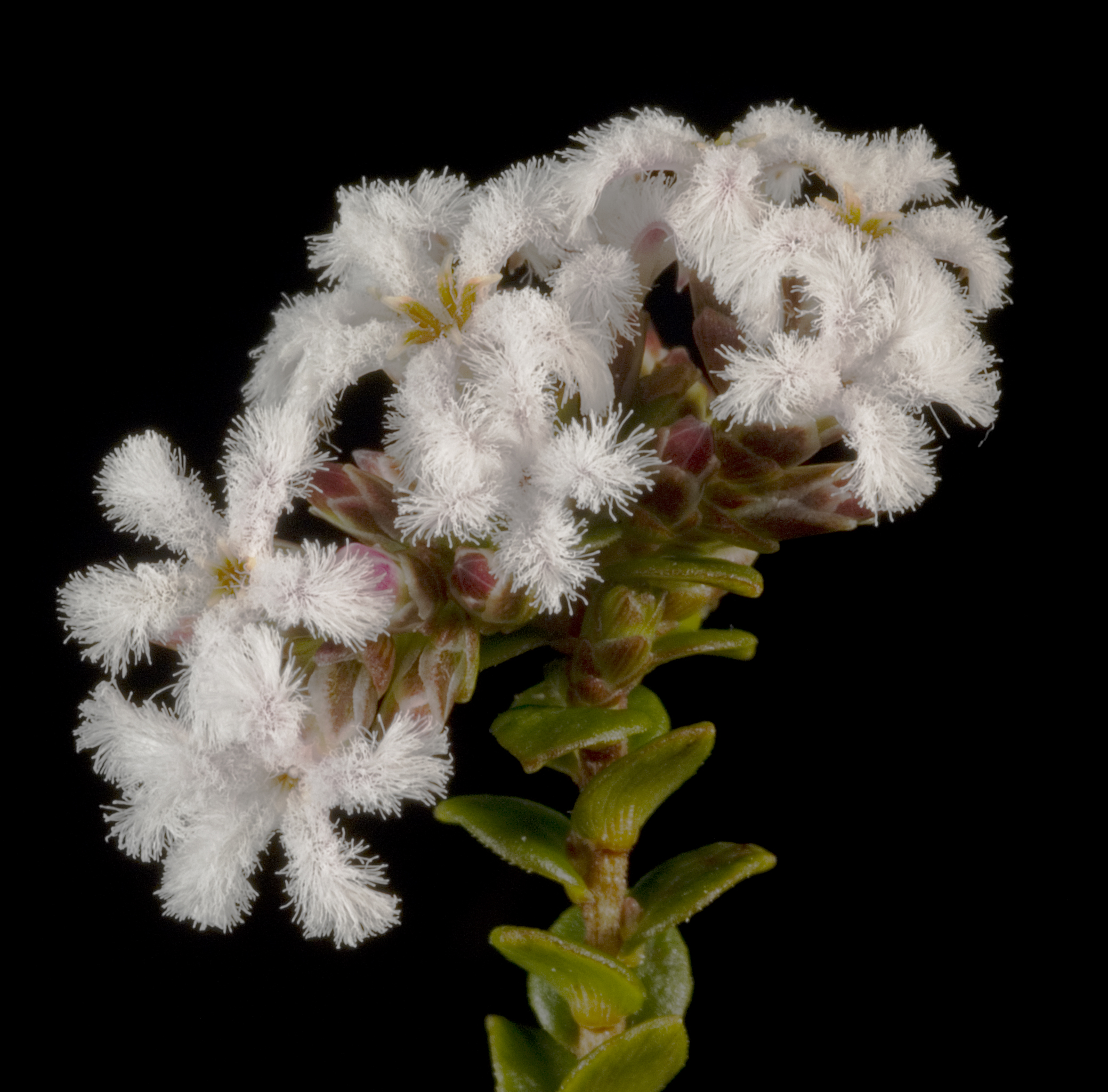

Scientific classification
- Kingdom: Plantae
- Clade: Tracheophytes
- Clade: Angiosperms
- Clade: Eudicots
- Clade: Asterids
- Order: Ericales
- Family: Ericaceae
- Genus: Leucopogon
- Species: L. cordatus

Binomial name
- Leucopogon cordatus Sond.
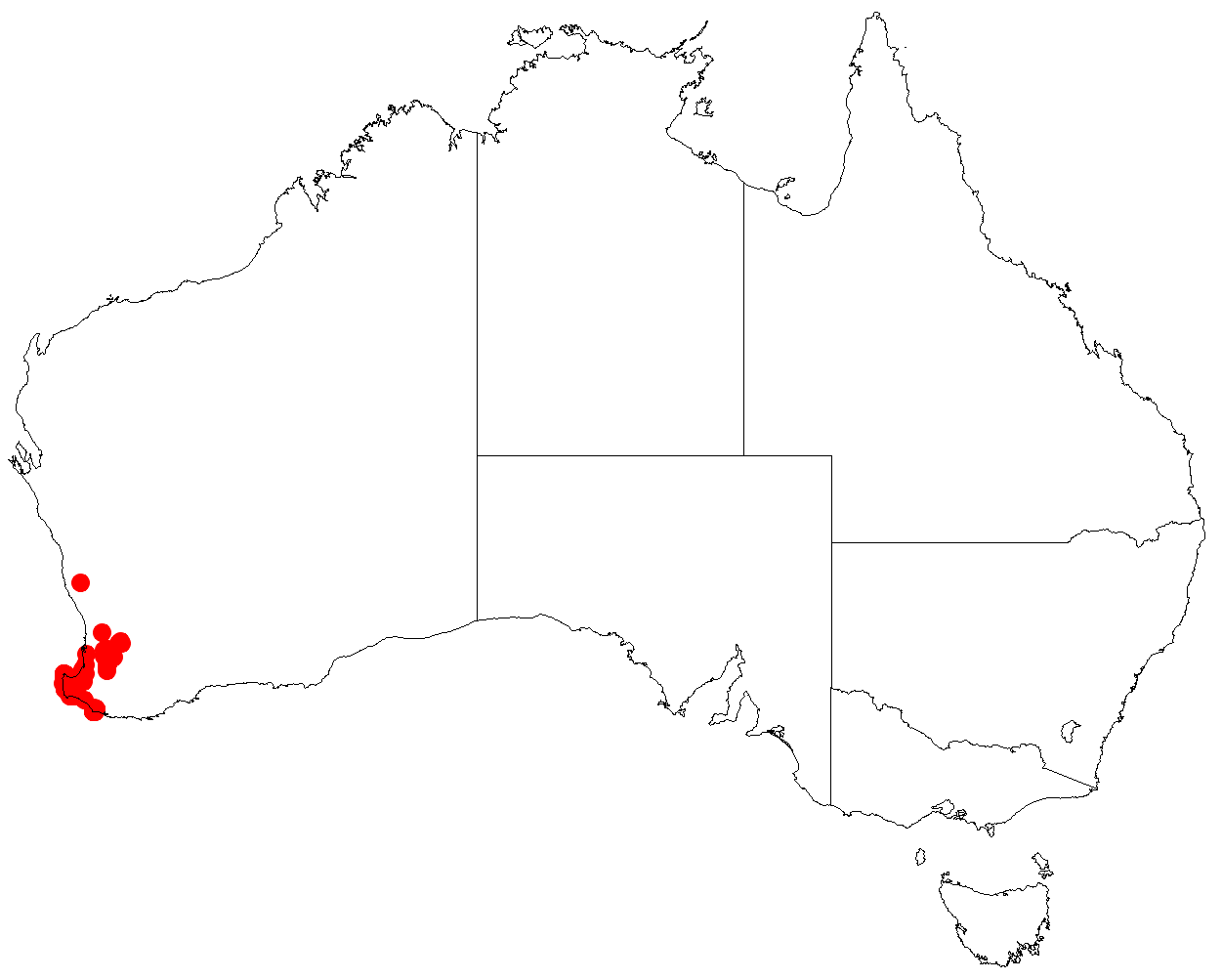
- Occurrence data from AVH

Synonyms
- Styphelia cordata (Sond.) F.Muell. nom.illeg.

= Leucopogon cordatus =

Species of shrub

Leucopogon cordatus is a small plant in the family Ericaceae and is endemic to Western Australia. It is an erect spreading shrub, typically growing to a height of 0.35–1 m (1 ft 2 in – 3 ft 3 in) on sandy soils often over granite, laterite or limestone. Its white flowers may be seen from July to November.

It was first formally described in 1845 by Otto Wilhelm Sonder in Johann Georg Christian Lehmann's Plantae Preissianae. The specific epithet (cordatus) means "heart-shaped", referring to the leaves.
