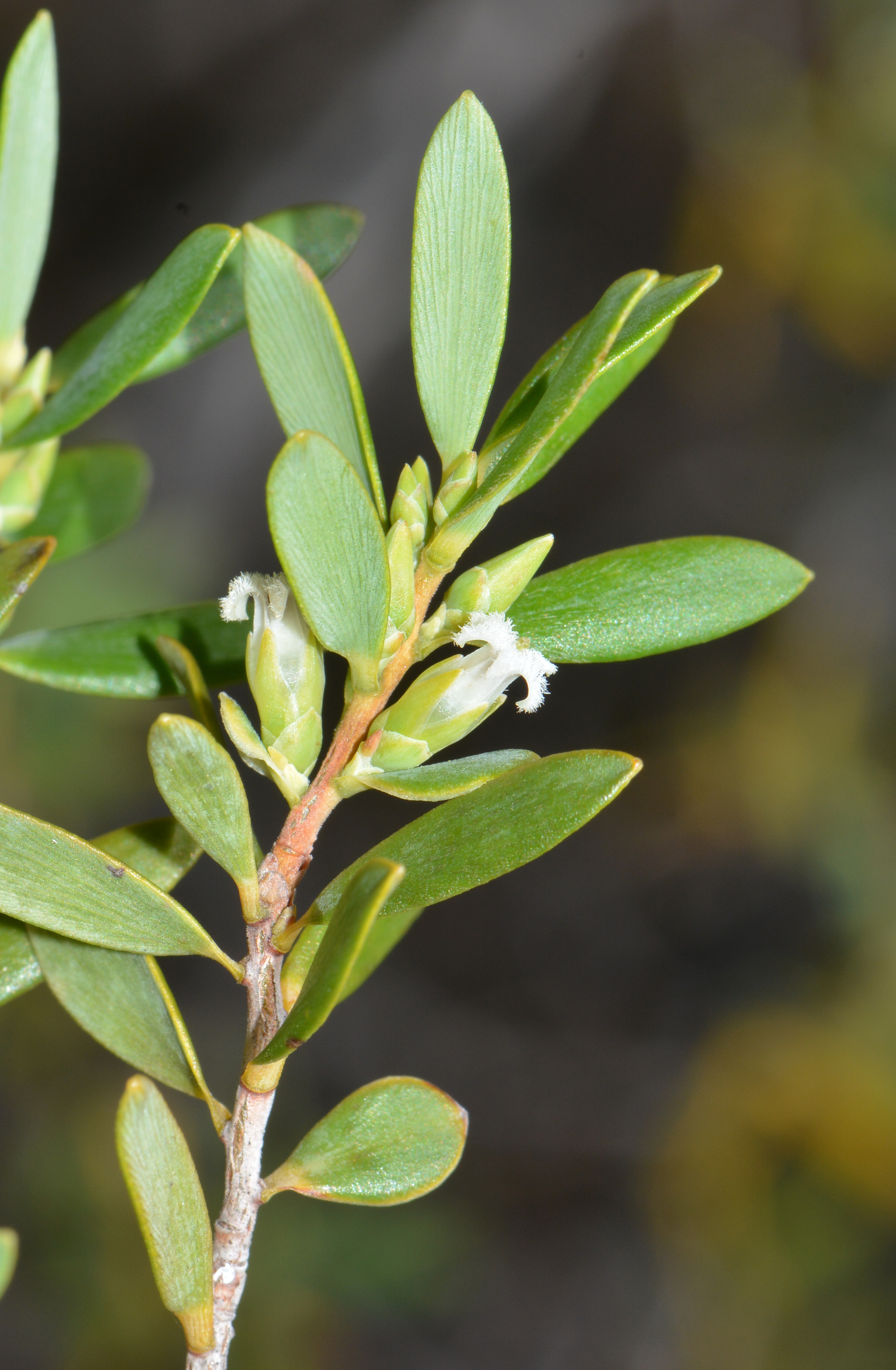

Scientific classification
- Kingdom: Plantae
- Clade: Tracheophytes
- Clade: Angiosperms
- Clade: Eudicots
- Clade: Asterids
- Order: Ericales
- Family: Ericaceae
- Genus: Styphelia
- Species: S. planifolia

Binomial name
- Styphelia planifolia (Sond.) Sleumer
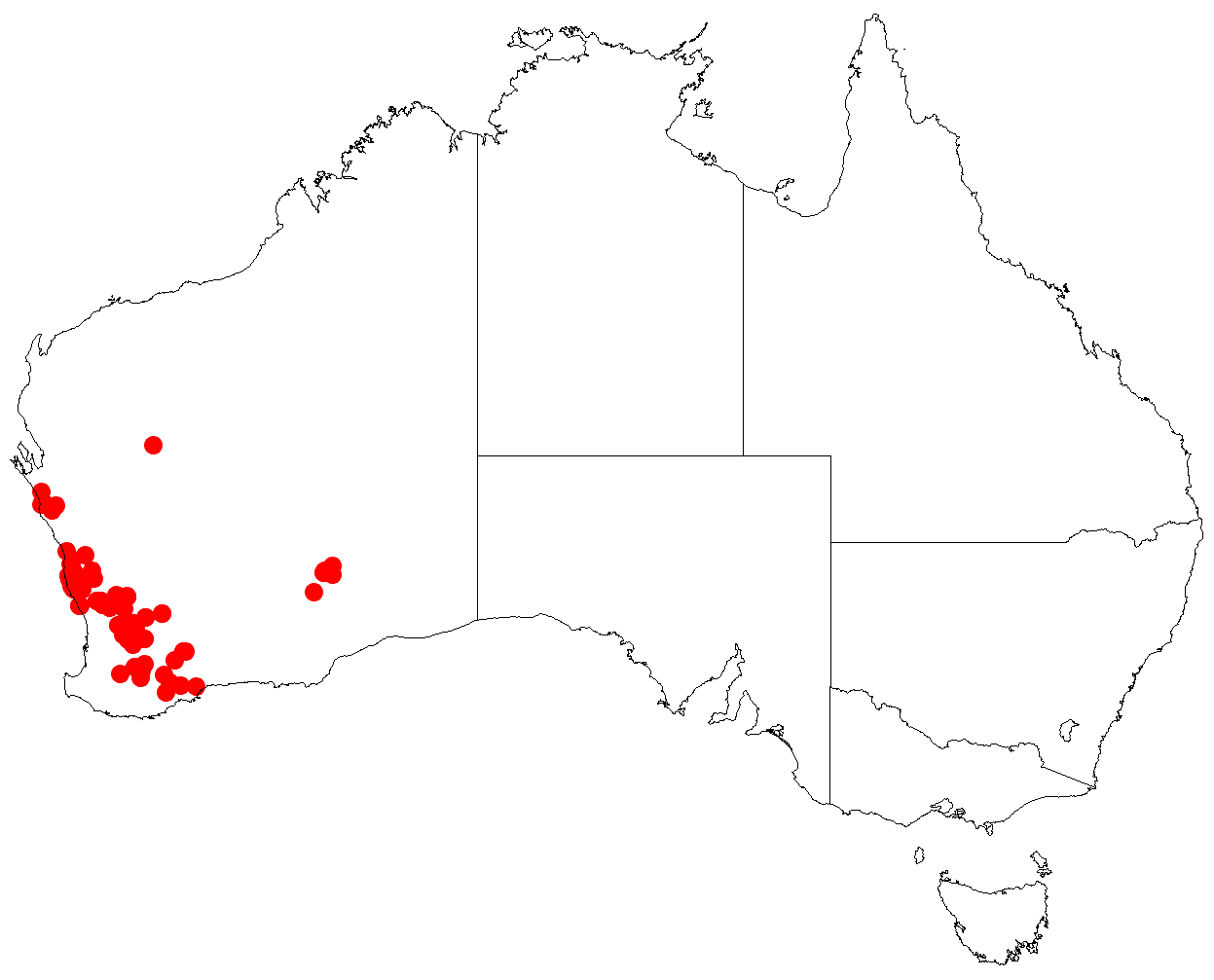
- Occurrence data from AVH

Synonyms
- Leucopogon planifolius Sond.; Leucopogon megacarpus F.Muell.; Styphelia megacarpa (F.Muell.) F.Muell.

= Styphelia planifolia =

Species of shrub

Styphelia planifolia is a species of flowering plant in the heath family Ericaceae and is endemic to the south-west of Western Australia. It is a bushy shrub with narrowly oblong or lance-shaped leaves with a small, sharp point on the tip, and white, tube-shaped flowers.

== Description ==
Styphelia planifolia is a bushy shrub with narrowly oblong or lance-shaped leaves with the narrower end towards the base, 6.3–13 mm (0.25–0.51 in) long, with a small, sharp point on the tip. The flowers are borne in pairs or threes in leaf axils with tiny bracts, and blunt bracteoles less than half as long as the sepals. The sepals are about 2.0–2.6 mm (0.079–0.102 in) long, the petals white and joined at the base, forming a tube slightly shorter than the sepals, the petal lobes almost as long as the petal tube.

== Taxonomy ==
This species was first formally described in 1845 by Otto Wilhelm Sonder who gave it the name Leucopogon planifolius in Lehmann's Plantae Preissianae from specimens collected near York in 1840. That name was accepted until 2020, the species was transferred to the genus Styphelia as S. planifolia, based on the phylogenetic studies of Darren Crayn, Michael Hislop and Caroline Puente-Lelièvre in Australian Systematic Botany.

== Distribution ==
Styphelia planifolia is found in the Avon Wheatbelt, Esperance Plains, Geraldton Sandplains, Jarrah Forest, Mallee, and Swan Coastal Plain bioregions of south-western Western Australia.

== Conservation status ==
This styphelia is listed as "not threatened" by the Government of Western Australia Department of Biodiversity, Conservation and Attractions.
