= Leucopogon lasiophyllus =

Scientific classification
- Kingdom: Plantae
- Clade: Tracheophytes
- Clade: Angiosperms
- Clade: Eudicots
- Clade: Asterids
- Order: Ericales
- Family: Ericaceae
- Genus: Leucopogon
- Species: L. lasiophyllus

Binomial name
- Leucopogon lasiophyllus Stschegl.
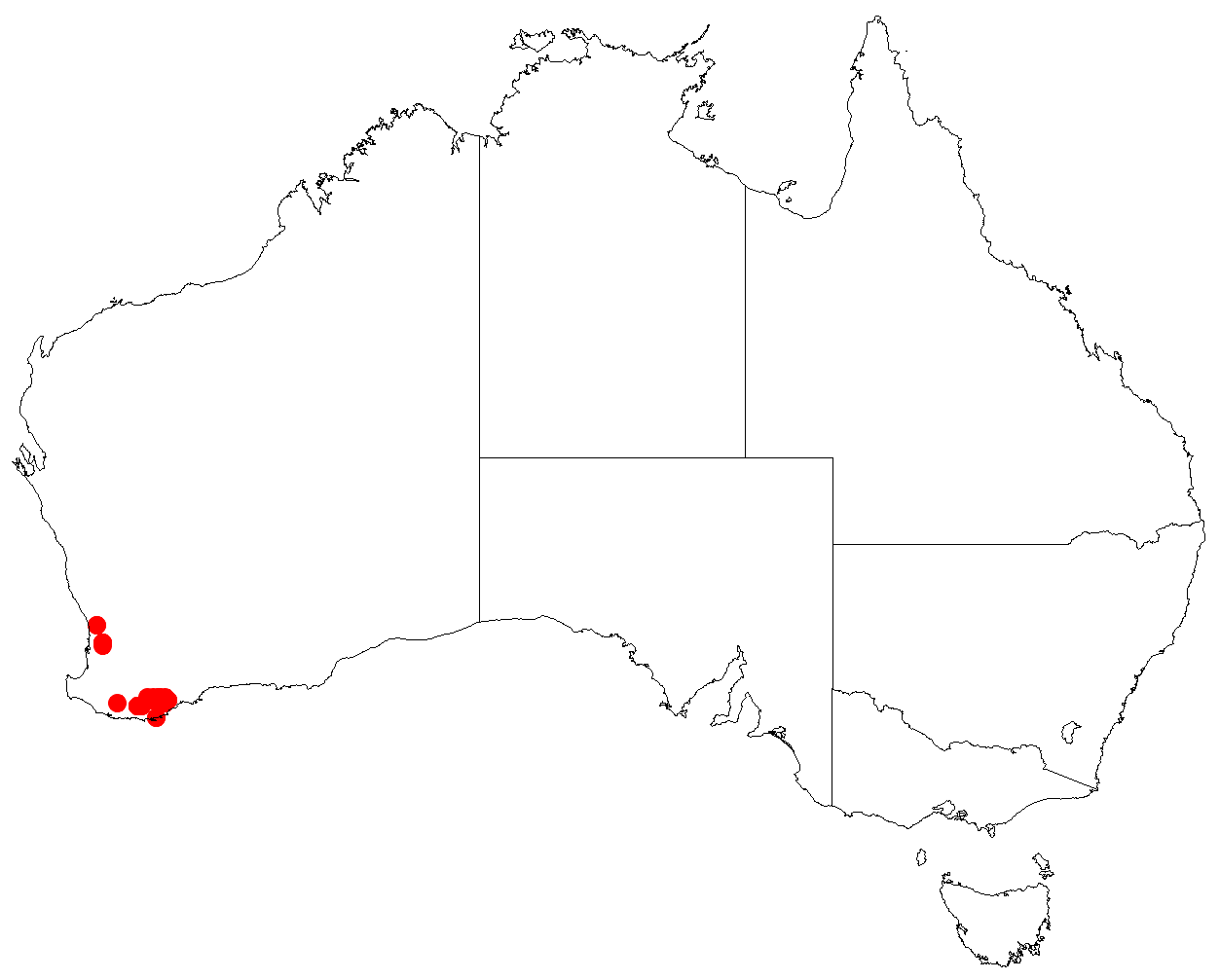
- Occurrence data from AVH

Synonyms
- Styphelia lasiophylla (Stschegl.) Sleumer

Species of shrub

Leucopogon lasiophyllus is a species of flowering plant in the heath family Ericaceae and is endemic to the south-west of Western Australia. It is an erect shrub with linear to lance-shaped leaves and small, dense spikes of tube-shaped white flowers on the ends of branches and in leaf axils.

== Description ==
Leucopogon lasiophyllus is an erect shrub that typically grows to a height of 0.3–1 m (1 ft 0 in – 3 ft 3 in) and has its branches and foliage covered with short, rigid hairs. The leaves are linear to lance-shaped with a blunt tip, 4–9 mm (0.16–0.35 in) long and prominently ribbed. The flowers are arranged in small, short, dense spike on the ends of branches or in upper leaf axils with leaf-like bracts and tapering bracteoles about half as long as the sepals. The sepals are softly hairy, 2.6–3.1 mm (0.10–0.12 in) long and the petals white and 4.2 mm (0.17 in) long, the lobes about the same length as the petal tube.

== Taxonomy ==
Leucopogon lasiophyllus was first formally described in 1859 by Sergei Sergeyevich Sheglejev in the Bulletin de la Société impériale des naturalistes de Moscou from specimens collected by James Drummond. The specific epithet (lasiophyllus) means "shaggy- or woolly-hairy leaved".

== Distribution and habitat ==
This leucopogon grows on hillsides in sandy or stony soils in the Esperance Plains bioregion of south-western Western Australia.

== Conservation status ==
Leucopogon lasiophyllus is listed as "Priority Four" by the Government of Western Australia Department of Biodiversity, Conservation and Attractions, meaning that it is rare or near threatened.
