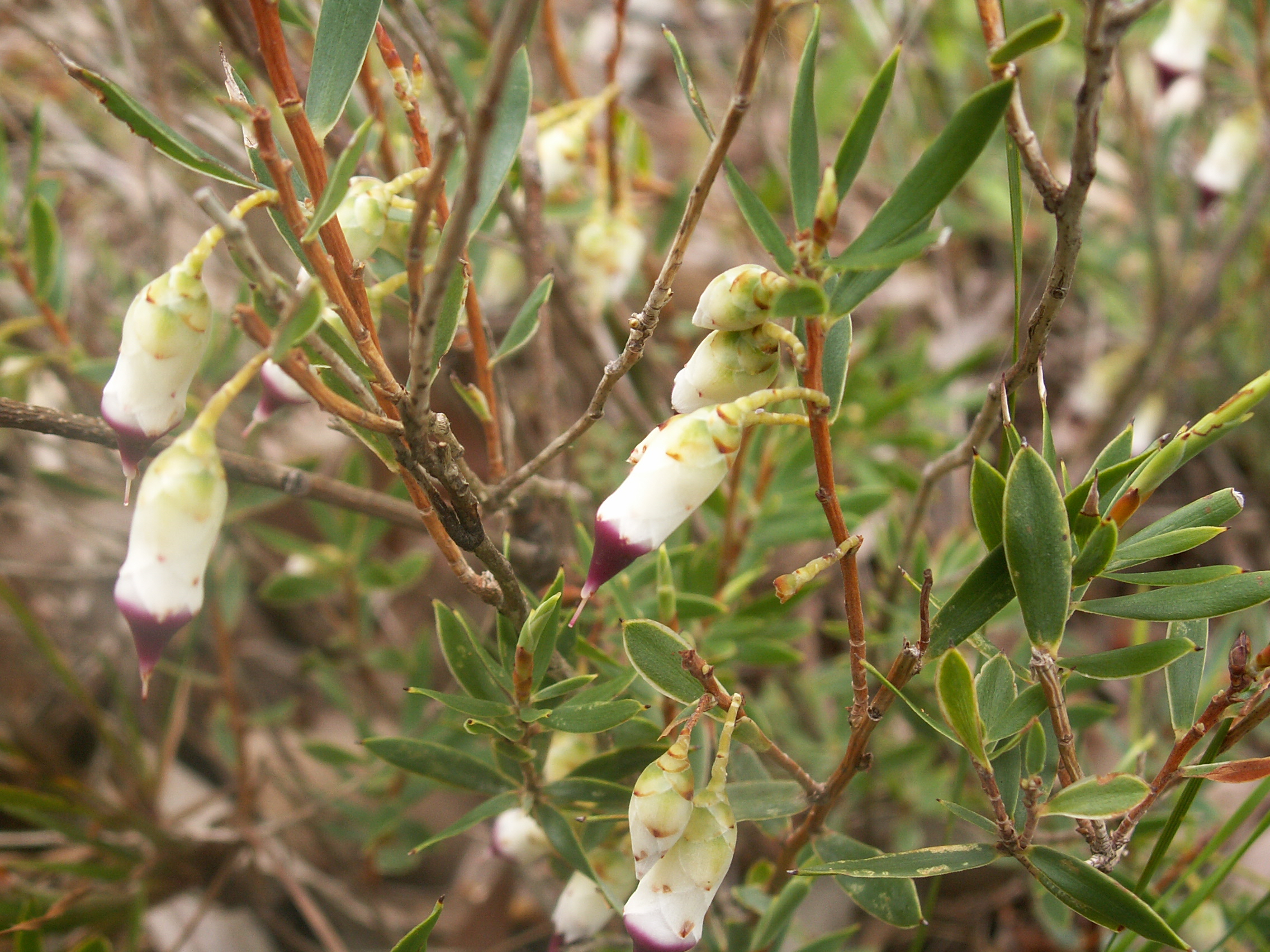
- Conostephium pendulum near Bunbury

Scientific classification
- Kingdom: Plantae
- Clade: Tracheophytes
- Clade: Angiosperms
- Clade: Eudicots
- Clade: Asterids
- Order: Ericales
- Family: Ericaceae
- Genus: Conostephium
- Species: C. pendulum

Binomial name
- Conostephium pendulum Benth.

Synonyms
- Styphelia conostephium F.Muell.

= Conostephium pendulum =

Pearl flower

Species of flowering plant

Conostephium pendulum, commonly known as pearl flower, is a small, open shrub in the family Ericaceae endemic to the Swan Coastal Plain from Eneabba to Margaret River.

== Description ==
Conostephium pendulum grows to a height of 1 metre or less, has oblong or linear leaves about 2.5 cm long and with a sharp point on the end. The flowers, which occur from June to September, are cream coloured with a red-purple tip, about 11 mm long, tubular in shape with the style protruding beyond the floral tube. The flowers hang individually from the leaf axils.

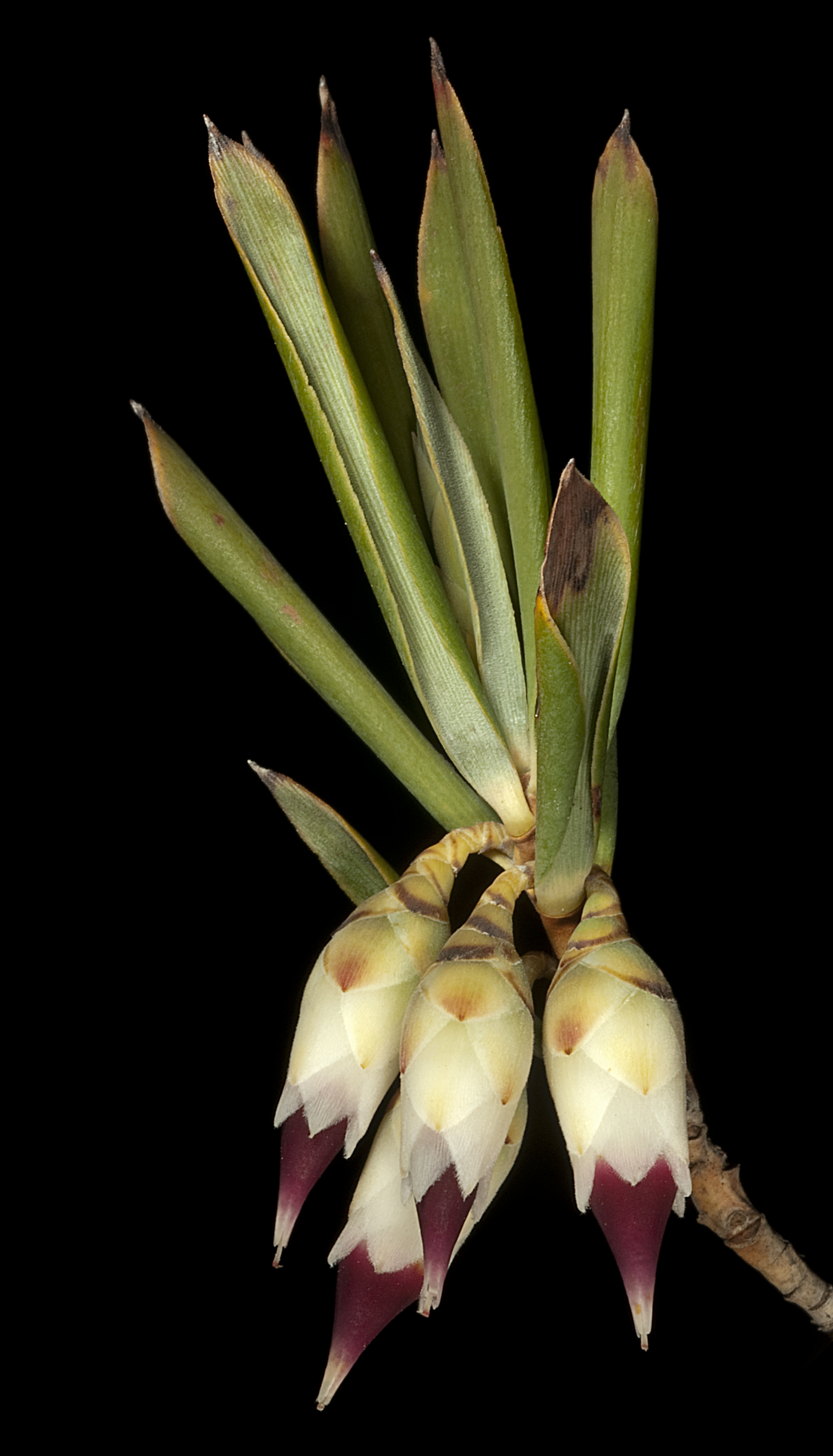
Close up of flower

== Taxonomy and naming ==
The species was named by George Bentham in 1837 in Endlicher's Enumeratio plantarum quas in Novae Hollandiae ora austro-occidentali ad fluvium Cygnorum et in sinu Regis Georgii collegit Carolus Liber Baro de Hügel from a specimen collected by Charles von Hügel. It was the first species in the genus to be described. The specific epithet is a Latin word meaning "hanging down", "pendent" or "drooping".

== Distribution and habitat ==
Conostephium pendulum occurs on sandy soils and is often associated with Banksia woodland, or in the northern part of it range with heath. It is the most widespread and common species of its genus being found in the Avon Wheatbelt, Geraldton Sandplains, Jarrah forest, Swan Coastal Plain and Warren biogeographic regions of Western Australia.

== Propagation and cultivation ==
This species is not well known in cultivation but may respond to treatment similar to that for the closely related members of the family Ericaceae.
