= Conostephium laeve =

Scientific classification
- Kingdom: Plantae
- Clade: Tracheophytes
- Clade: Angiosperms
- Clade: Eudicots
- Clade: Asterids
- Order: Ericales
- Family: Ericaceae
- Genus: Conostephium
- Species: C. laeve

Binomial name
- Conostephium laeve Hislop

Species of flowering plant

Conostephium laeve is a species of flowering plant in the family Ericaceae and is endemic to the west of Western Australia. It is a compact shrub with erect, narrowly elliptic or narrowly egg-shaped leaves with the narrower end toward the base, and pendulous, spindle-shaped, cream to straw-coloured and pink flowers.

== Description ==
Conostephium laeve is a compact shrub that typically grows up about 1.5 m (4 ft 11 in) high and wide, and has many stems at the base. The leaves are narrowly elliptic or narrowly egg-shaped with the narrower end toward the base, 5.5–18 mm (0.22–0.71 in) long and 2.0–5.5 mm (0.079–0.217 in) wide on a petiole 0.5–1.8 mm (0.020–0.071 in) long. Both sides of the leaves are usually hairy. The flowers are more or less pendulous with overlapping bracts at the base. There are 8 to 13 broadly egg-shaped floral bracts, the upper bracts 1.7–3.0 mm (0.067–0.118 in) long and cream- to straw-coloured, egg-shaped bracteoles 3.2–5.2 mm (0.13–0.20 in) long and 2.0–2.6 mm (0.079–0.102 in) wide. The sepals are egg-shaped or narrowly egg-shaped, 4.8–7.3 mm (0.19–0.29 in) long, the petal tube usually narrowly conical and 6.8–9.5 mm (0.27–0.37 in) long and pink. Flowering mainly occurs from April to September and the fruit is oval and 8.2–10.2 mm (0.32–0.40 in) long.

== Taxonomy and naming ==
Conostephium laeve was first formally described in 2013 by Michael Hislop in the journal Nuytsia from specimens he collected near Northampton in 2005. The specific epithet (laeve) means "smooth", referring to the petal tube.

== Distribution and habitat ==
Conostephium laeve grows in woodland, shrubland or heath, mainly from the Shark Bay area and through Kalbarri National Park to near Binnu in the north of the Geraldton Sandplains bioregion, and in the far west of the Yalgoo bioregion, in the west of Western Australia.

== Conservation status ==
This conostephium is listed as "not threatened" by the Western Australian Government Department of Biodiversity, Conservation and Attractions.
