= Conostephium papillosum =

Scientific classification
- Kingdom: Plantae
- Clade: Tracheophytes
- Clade: Angiosperms
- Clade: Eudicots
- Clade: Asterids
- Order: Ericales
- Family: Ericaceae
- Genus: Conostephium
- Species: C. papillosum

Binomial name
- Conostephium papillosum Hislop

Species of flowering plant

Conostephium papillosum is a species of flowering plant in the family Ericaceae and is endemic to the south of Western Australia. It is a compact shrub with erect, narrowly elliptic or narrowly egg-shaped leaves with the narrower end toward the base, and pendulous, spindle-shaped, cream to straw-coloured and dark purple flowers.

== Description ==
Conostephium papillosum is a compact shrub that typically grows up about 1.5 m (4 ft 11 in) high and wide, and has many stems at the base. The leaves are erect, narrowly elliptic or narrowly egg-shaped with the narrower end toward the base, 3.8–8.0 mm (0.15–0.31 in) long and 1.0–2.3 mm (0.039–0.091 in) wide on a petiole 0.4–1.2 mm (0.016–0.047 in) long. Both sides of the leaves are sparsely hairy or glabrous. The flowers are more or less pendulous with overlapping bracts at the base. There are 7 to 9 broadly egg-shaped floral bracts, the upper bracts 1.3–2.2 mm (0.051–0.087 in) long, and egg-shaped to more or less round bracteoles 2.1–3.4 mm (0.083–0.134 in) long and 1.5–2.3 mm (0.059–0.091 in) wide. The sepals are egg-shaped or narrowly egg-shaped, 3.3–6.0 mm (0.13–0.24 in) long, the petal tube usually spindle-shaped and 5.7–9.0 mm (0.22–0.35 in) long and dark purple, the lobes white or cream-coloured. Flowering mainly occurs from May to October and the fruit is broadly oval and about 4 mm (0.16 in) long.

== Taxonomy and naming ==
Conostephium papillosum was first formally described in 2013 by Michael Hislop in the journal Nuytsia from specimens he collected north of Condingup in 2006. The specific epithet (papillosum) means "papillate", referring to the texture of part of the petal tube.

== Distribution and habitat ==
This species usually grows in mallee woodland, sometimes around saline depressions and is found from north-east of Esperance to Israelite Bay in the Esperance Plains and Mallee bioregions of southern Western Australia.

== Conservation status ==
This conostephium is listed as "not threatened" by the Western Australian Government Department of Biodiversity, Conservation and Attractions.
