= Ottosonderia =

Scientific classification
- Kingdom: Plantae
- Clade: Tracheophytes
- Clade: Angiosperms
- Clade: Eudicots
- Order: Caryophyllales
- Family: Aizoaceae
- Subfamily: Ruschioideae
- Tribe: Ruschieae
- Genus: Ottosonderia; L.Bolus

Genus of flowering plant

Ottosonderia is a genus of flowering plants belonging to the family Aizoaceae.

Its native range is the Cape Provinces in South Africa.

The genus name of Ottosonderia is in honour of Otto Wilhelm Sonder (1812–1881), a German botanist and pharmacist. It was first described and published in Notes Mesembryanthemum Vol.3 on page 292 in 1958.

== Known species ==
According to Kew:

- Ottosonderia monticola (Sond.) L.Bolus
- Ottosonderia obtusa L.Bolus
