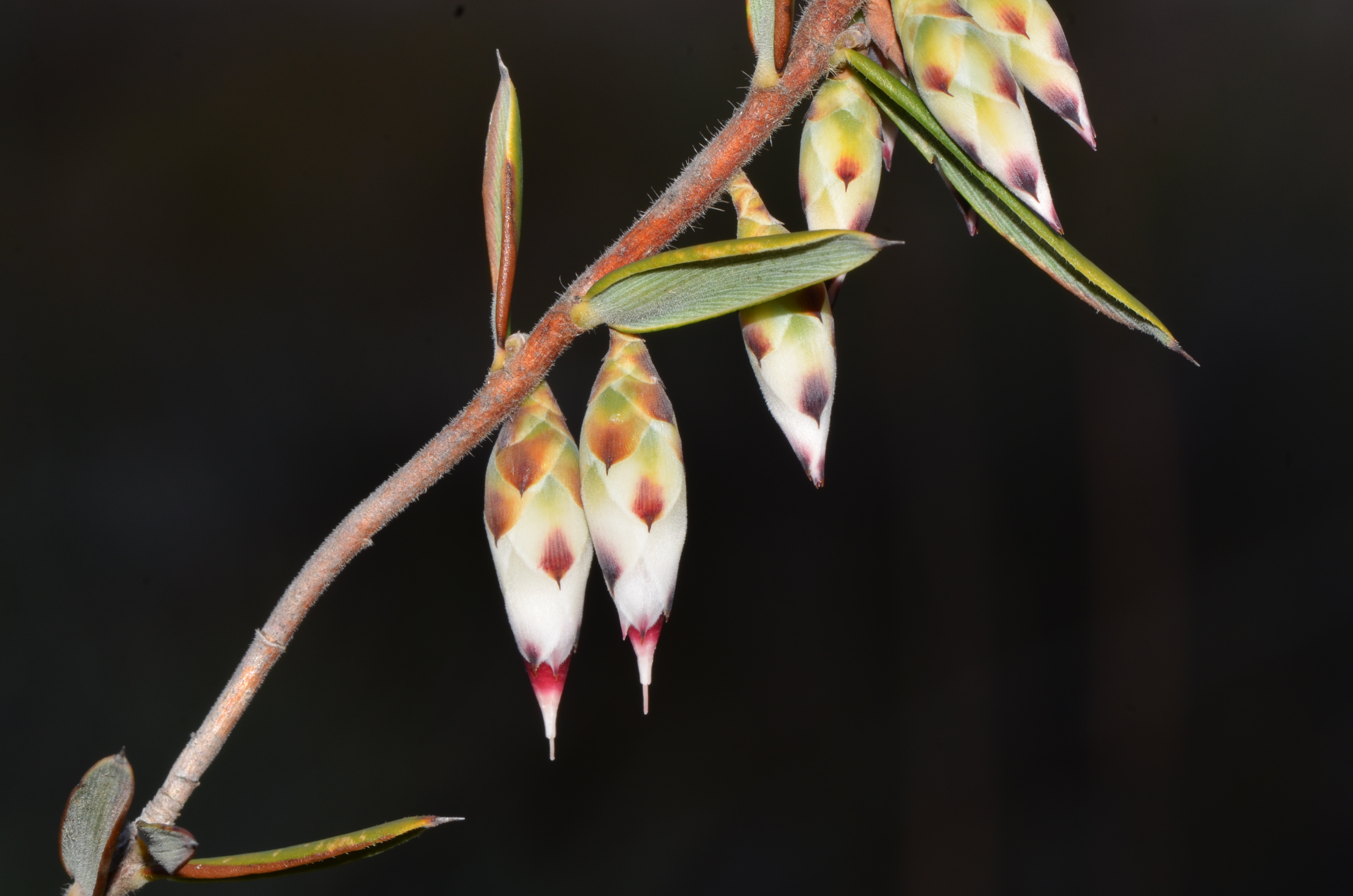

Scientific classification
- Kingdom: Plantae
- Clade: Tracheophytes
- Clade: Angiosperms
- Clade: Eudicots
- Clade: Asterids
- Order: Ericales
- Family: Ericaceae
- Genus: Conostephium
- Species: C. hortiorum

Binomial name
- Conostephium hortiorum Hislop

= Conostephium hortiorum =

Species of flowering plant

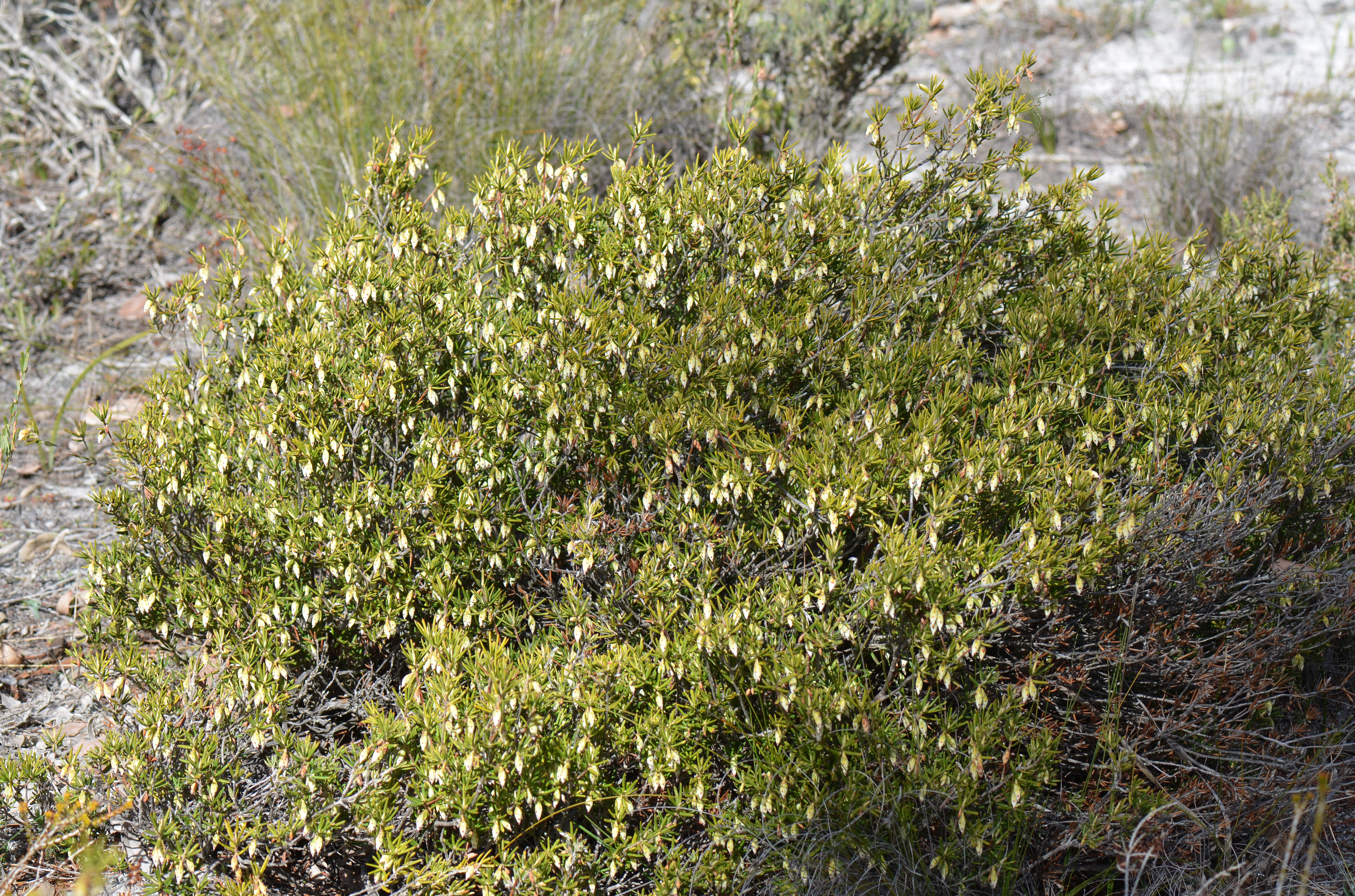
Habit

Conostephium hortiorum is a species of flowering plant in the family Ericaceae and is endemic to the south-west of Western Australia. It is a spreading shrub with linear, narrowly elliptic or narrowly triangular sharply-pointed leaves and pendulous, spindle-shaped, straw-coloured and dark purple flowers.

== Description ==
Conostephium hortiorum is a spreading shrub that typically grows up about 1.2 m (3 ft 11 in) high and 1.5 m (4 ft 11 in) wide, its young branchlets covered with spreading hairs up to 1.2 mm (0.047 in) long. The leaves are linear, narrowly elliptic or narrowly triangular, 14–25 mm (0.55–0.98 in) long and 0.8–3.6 mm (0.031–0.142 in) wide on a petiole 0.7–1.4 mm (0.028–0.055 in) long. There is a sharply-pointed tip on the ends of the leaves. The flowers are more or less pendulous with overlapping bracts at the base. There are three to six egg-shaped floral bracts 4.0–6.8 mm (0.16–0.27 in) long and straw-coloured, egg-shaped bracteoles 6.8–8.6 mm (0.27–0.34 in) long, usually with a dark purple tip. The sepals are egg-shaped, 8.5–10.8 mm (0.33–0.43 in) long, the petal tube spindle-shaped and 9.5–12.8 mm (0.37–0.50 in) long. Flowering mainly occurs from July to September and the fruit is oval and about 7.5 mm (0.30 in) long.

== Taxonomy and naming ==
Conostephium hortiorum was first formally described in 2013 by Michael Hislop in the journal Nuytsia from specimens collected by Fred and Jean Hort in Wandoo National Park. The specific epithet honours the collectors of the type specimens.

== Distribution and habitat ==
Conostephium hortiorum in low woodland only sandy soil on the eastern part of the Darling Range, mainly between the Great Southern and Brookton Highways in the Jarrah forest biogeographic region of south-western Western Australia.

== Conservation status ==
This conostephium is listed as "not threatened" by the Western Australian Government Department of Biodiversity, Conservation and Attractions.
