= Conostephium marchantiorum =

Conservation status
- Priority Three — Poorly Known Taxa (DEC)

Scientific classification
- Kingdom: Plantae
- Clade: Tracheophytes
- Clade: Angiosperms
- Clade: Eudicots
- Clade: Asterids
- Order: Ericales
- Family: Ericaceae
- Genus: Conostephium
- Species: C. marchantiorum

Binomial name
- Conostephium marchantiorum Strid

Species of plant

Conostephium marchantiorum is a species of flowering plant in the heath family Ericaceae and is endemic to the south-west of Western Australia. It is an erect shrub with linear leaves clustered near the ends of branchlets, and pale green and pink, densely-bearded, tube-shaped flowers.

== Description ==
Conostephium marchantiorum is an erect shrub that typically grows to a height of about 1 m (3 ft 3 in) and has many branches, its leaves clustered near the ends of twigs. The leaves are linear, leathery, 8–11 mm (0.31–0.43 in) long and 0.9–1.6 mm (0.035–0.063 in) wide on a petiole 0.5–1 mm (0.020–0.039 in) long. The edges of the leaves are rolled under and the lower surface has several prominent longitudinal veins. The flowers are arranged singly in 2 to 4 leaf axils on each twig with small, egg-shaped bracts and several broader, overlapping bracteoles closely surrounding the flowers. The sepals are lance-shaped, 2.8–3.2 mm (0.11–0.13 in) long, the petals white and joined at the base to form a tube about 1.6 mm (0.063 in) long. The petal lobes are twice as long as the petal tube and densely bearded. Flowering has been observed in March, July and November.

== Taxonomy and naming ==
Conostephium marchantiorum was first formally described in 1986 by Arne Strid in the journal Willdenowia from specimens he collected near Scaddan in 1983. The specific epithet (marchantiorum) honours Neville Graeme Marchant and his wife Denise.

== Distribution and habitat ==
This leucopogon grows on sand on plains, creeklines and the edges of salt lakes in the Esperance Plains and Mallee bioregions of south-western Western Australia.

== Conservation status ==
Leucopogon marchantiorum is listed as "Priority Three" by the Government of Western Australia Department of Biodiversity, Conservation and Attractions, meaning that it is poorly known and known from only a few locations but is not under imminent threat.
