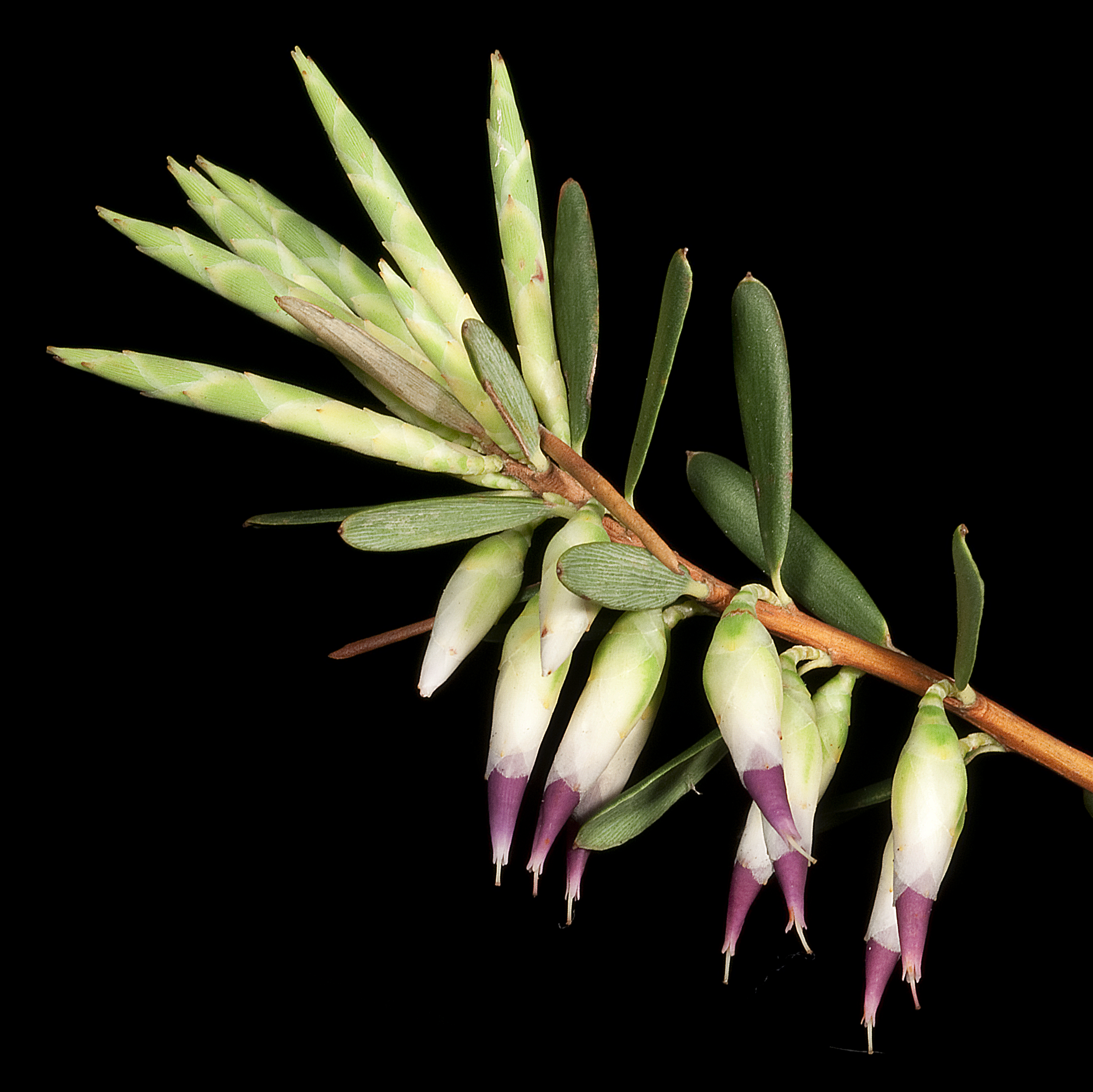

Conservation status
- Priority Four — Rare Taxa (DEC)

Scientific classification
- Kingdom: Plantae
- Clade: Tracheophytes
- Clade: Angiosperms
- Clade: Eudicots
- Clade: Asterids
- Order: Ericales
- Family: Ericaceae
- Genus: Conostephium
- Species: C. magnum

Binomial name
- Conostephium magnum Cranfield

= Conostephium magnum =

Species of flowering plant

Conostephium magnum is a species of flowering plant in the family Ericaceae and is endemic to the south-west of Western Australia. It is an erect, compact shrub with scattered lance-shaped leaves with the narrower end toward the base, and pendulous, spindle-shaped, cream-coloured to white and pink flowers arranged singly in leaf axils.

== Description ==
Conostephium magnum is an erect, compact shrub that typically grows to a height of 0.4–2 m (1 ft 4 in – 6 ft 7 in), and has many stems at the base. The leaves are lance-shaped with the narrower end toward the base, 11–28 mm (0.43–1.10 in) long and 2–4 mm (0.079–0.157 in) wide on a petiole 1.0–1.7 mm (0.039–0.067 in) long. The leaves are glabrous and the edges are often rolled inwards. The flowers are arranged singly in leaf axils on a pendulous pedicel 1.5–3 mm (0.059–0.118 in) long with 4 to 6 bracts and 3 to 5 bracteoles 6–8 mm (0.24–0.31 in) long and about 3 mm (0.12 in) wide, grading into the sepals. The sepals are narrowly egg-shaped, 7–9 mm (0.28–0.35 in) long and overlap each other, the petal tube usually white to cream-coloured and pink, 7–9 mm (0.28–0.35 in) long. Flowering occurs from July to September, the fruit more or less spherical and about 6 mm (0.24 in) long.

== Taxonomy and naming ==
Conostephium magnum was first formally described in 2002 by Raymond Jeffrey Cranfield in the journal Nuytsia from specimens collected near the Tiwest Cooljarloo mine site in 1993. The specific epithet (magnum) means "large", referring to the height of the species.

== Distribution and habitat ==
Conostephium magnum grows on sand dunes, disturbed roadsides and in swamp and open woodland, mainly from Cataby to near Gingin in the Geraldton Sandplains and Swan Coastal Plain bioregions of south-western Western Australia.

== Conservation status ==
This conostephium is listed as "Priority Four" by the Government of Western Australia Department of Biodiversity, Conservation and Attractions, meaning that it is rare or near threatened.
