= Conostephium roei =

Scientific classification
- Kingdom: Plantae
- Clade: Tracheophytes
- Clade: Angiosperms
- Clade: Eudicots
- Clade: Asterids
- Order: Ericales
- Family: Ericaceae
- Genus: Conostephium
- Species: C. roei

Binomial name
- Conostephium roei Benth.

Species of flowering plant

Conostephium roei is a species of flowering plant in the family Ericaceae and is endemic to the southwest of Western Australia. It is an erect shrub with egg-shaped, oblong or linear leaves with and white and purple or reddish brown flowers.

== Description ==
Conostephium roei is an erect shrub that typically grows to a height of 0.3–1.2 m (1 ft 0 in – 3 ft 11 in). Its leaves are egg-shaped, oblong or linear, mostly 6–8.5 mm (0.24–0.33 in) long with the edges sometimes rolled. The flowers are 8.5–9.5 mm (0.33–0.37 in) long, more or less sessile, and downturned, with bracteoles nearly as long as the sepals. The sepals are white, less than 6.5 mm (0.26 in) long, the petal tube conical, hairy near the tip, and purple or reddish brown. Flowering occurs from August to October.

== Taxonomy and naming ==
Conostephium roei was first formally described in 1868 by George Bentham in Flora Australiensis from specimens collected "in the interior" by John Septimus Roe. The specific epithet (roei) honours the collector of the type specimens.

== Distribution and habitat ==
This species usually grows near salt lakes in sandy soil, and occurs between Ongerup, Lake Magenta and Newdegate in the Mallee bioregion of southern Western Australia.

== Conservation status ==
This conostephium is listed as "not threatened" by the Western Australian Government Department of Biodiversity, Conservation and Attractions.
