= Otto Wilhelm Sonder =

Botanist (1812–1881)

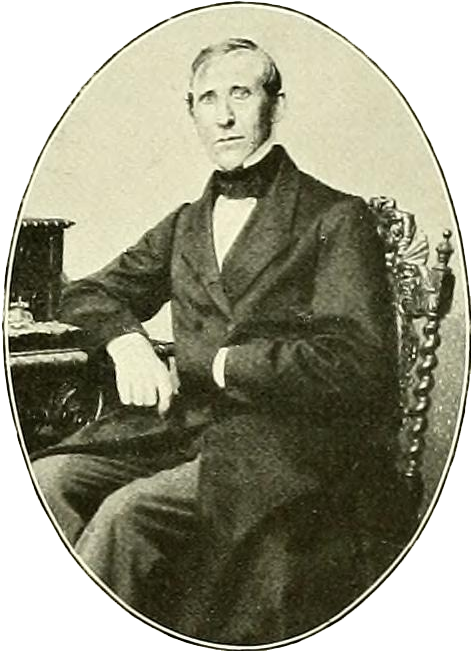
- Otto Wilhelm Sonder (1863)
- Born: June 18, 1812; Bad Oldesloe, Duchy of Holstein
- Died: November 21, 1881 (aged 69); Hamburg, Germany
- Scientific career
- Fields: Botany, pharmacy
- Author abbrev. (botany): Sond.

Otto Wilhelm Sonder (18 June 1812, Bad Oldesloe – 21 November 1881) was a German botanist and pharmacist.

== Life ==
A native of Holstein, Sonder studied at Kiel University, where he sat pharmaceutical examinations in 1835, before becoming the proprietor of a pharmacy in Hamburg from 1841 to 1878. In 1846 he received an honorary doctorate from the University of Königsberg and was elected a member of the German National Academy of Sciences Leopoldina for his contribution to the field of botany.

== Herbarium ==
From a young age, Sonder showed considerable interest and skill in Botany. He often embarked on botanical excursions in his local area early in the morning before heading to work at the pharmacy. Throughout his life, Sonder met and conversed with many eminent botanists of the era. He amassed an extensive botanical collection that contained hundreds of thousands of herbarium specimens representing all major plant groups and spanning all parts of the globe. The collection is particularly significant for its South African specimens, as well as those from tropical South America and India. It also contains thousands of type specimens. After the collection grew too large for him to manage on his own, Sonder began the process of selling it to interested parties. Early on, he made an agreement with his friend and then the Director of the National Herbarium of Victoria Ferdinand von Mueller that Mueller would buy the herbarium for 1200 pounds sterling. However, when Mueller struggled to procure the funds, several other institutions enquired about the collection. Between late 1874 and early 1875, Sonder worked his way through the entire collection, sorting material and remounting specimens where needed. In 1875, nine cases of specimens were sent to the Swedish Museum of Natural History. Material was also sent to French botanist Jean Michel Gandoger. Eventually, the bulk of the collection, consisting of around 250–300,000 specimens, was purchased by the Melbourne Royal Botanic Gardens in 1883. These specimens remain in the National Herbarium of Victoria today.

== Standard author abbreviation ==
The standard author abbreviation Sond. is used to indicate this person as the author when citing a botanical name.

Sonder published over 1200 botanical names. See: Category:Taxa named by Otto Wilhelm Sonder and International Plant Name Index

== Publications ==
Sonder published several significant botanical works. He co-authored the multi-volume Flora Capensis (7 vol. in 11, 1859–1933) with William Henry Harvey (1811–1866), and was author of an 1851 botanical treatise called Flora Hamburgensis.

== Legacy ==
The following plants have been named in his honour:

=== Genera ===
- Ottosonderia of the family Aizoaceae
- Sonderina of the family Umbelliferae, now classed as a synonym of Dasispermum Neck. ex Raf.

=== Species ===
- Ficus sonderi

The following places have been named in his honour:

- Mount Sonder, also known by its Aboriginal name Rwetyepme, Northern Territory, Australia. Named during Ernest Giles' 1872 expedition to the west of Alice Springs.
