= Sergei Sergeyevich Sheglejev =

Sergei Sergeyevich Shchegléiev (Russian: Серге́й Серге́евич Щегле́ев; 1820–1859) was a Russian botanist, Ph.D. in botany, and associate professor at the Department of Botany at the National University of Kharkiv.

He was a taxonomist specialist of the family Epacridaceae, with an emphasis on Leucopogon. He regularly published in the Bulletin of the Société Impériale des Naturalistes de Moscou.

The standard author abbreviation Stschegl. is used to indicate this person as the author when citing a botanical name.
