= List of botanists by author abbreviation (B) =

This is an incomplete list of botanists by their author abbreviation, which is designed for citation with the botanical names or works that they have published. This list follows that established by Brummitt & Powell (1992). Use of that list is recommended by Rec. 46A Note 1 of the International Code of Nomenclature for algae, fungi, and plants. The list is kept up to date online at The International Plant Names Index and Index Fungorum.

In some cases an "author abbreviation" consists of a full surname, while in other cases the surname is abbreviated and/or accompanied by one or more initials. There is no space between the initials and the surname (or its abbreviation).

==== Order of entries ====
The list here is maintained strictly in order of the alphabetic characters in the abbreviation; thus "A.B.Jacks." appears under "A" not "J", and is located as if the characters were "ABJACKS". Capitalization is ignored as are all non-alphabetic characters such as "." and space. Diacritical marks are also ignored, so that, e.g., "ü" is treated as if it were "u".

==== Navigation ====
Because of its length, the list is split across separate pages. All alphabetic sections can be accessed from the short table of contents; the vertical bars show the page divisions. Searching will only find an entry within a page.

== A ==
Contents:	A	B	C	D	E F	G	H	I J	K L	M	N O	P	Q R	S	T U V	W X Y Z

To find entries for A, use the table of contents above.

== B ==
Contents: Top	A	B	C	D	E F	G	H	I J	K L	M	N O	P	Q R	S	T U V	W X Y Z

- Baardseth – Egil Baardseth (1912–1991)
- Baas – Pieter Baas (1944–2024)
- Baas-Beck. – Lourens Gerhard Marinus Baas-Becking (1894–1963)
- Bab. – Charles Cardale Babington (1808–1895)
- Babc. – Ernest Brown Babcock (1877–1954)
- B.A.Bohm – Bruce A. Bohm (fl. 1985)
- Babu – Cherukuri Raghavendra Babu (born 1940)
- Bacch. – Gianluigi Bacchetta (born 1968)
- Bach – Michael Bach (1808–1878)
- Bachm. – Franz Ewald Theodor Bachmann (1850–1937)
- Bacig. – Rimo Carlo Felice Bacigalupi (1901–1996)
- Bacigálová – Kamila Bacigálová (fl. 2005)
- Bacigalupo – Nélida María Bacigalupo (1924–2019)
- Bäck – Abraham Bäck (1713–1795)
- Backeb. – Curt Backeberg (1894–1966)
- Backer – Cornelis Andries Backer (1874–1963)
- Backh. – James Backhouse (1794–1869)
- Backh.f. – James Backhouse (1825–1890)
- Badham – Charles David Badham (1805–1857)
- Badré – Frederic Jean Badré (born 1937)
- Baehni – Charles Baehni (1906–1964)
- B.A.Ford – Bruce A. Ford (fl. 1998)
- Bagl. – Francesco Baglietto (1826–1916)
- Bagn. – James Eustace Bagnall (1830–1918)
- B.A.Gomes – Bernardino António Gomes (1806–1877)
- Bahadur – Kunwar Naresh Bahadur (1935–1984)
- Buijsen – J.R.M. Buijsen (fl. 1988)
- Bailey – Jacob Whitman Bailey (1811–1857)
- Baill. – Henri Ernest Baillon (1827–1895)
- Baillon – Louis Antoine François Baillon (1778–1851)
- Baines – Henry Baines (1793–1878)
- Baker – John Gilbert Baker (1834–1920)
- Baker f. – Edmund Gilbert Baker (1864–1949)
- Bakh. – Reinier Cornelis Bakhuizen van den Brink (1881–1945)
- Bakh.f. – Reinier Cornelis Bakhuizen van den Brink (1911–1987)
- Balach. – Indu Balachandran (fl. 1983)
- Balamuth – William Balamuth (1914–1981)
- Balandin – Sergey Aleksandrovich Balandin (born 1952)
- Balansa – Benedict Balansa (1825–1891)
- Balb. – Giovanni Battista Balbis (1765–1831)
- Bald. – Antonio Baldacci (1867–1950)
- Baldinger – Ernst Gottfried Baldinger (1738–1804)
- Baldwin – William Baldwin (1779–1819)
- Balete – Danilo S. Balete (born 1960)
- B.A.Lewis – Beverley Ann Lewis (born 1966)
- Balf. – John Hutton Balfour (1808–1884)
- Balf.f. – Isaac Bayley Balfour (1853–1922)
- Balgooy – Max Michael Josephus van Balgooy (1932–2021)
- Balick – Michael Jeffrey Balick (born 1952)
- Ball – John Ball (1818–1889)
- Balls – Edward Kent Balls (1892–1984)
- Bals.-Criv. – Giuseppe Gabriel Balsamo-Crivelli (1800–1874)
- Bal.-Tul. – Emilie Balátová-Tuláčková (1926–2005)
- Balzer – F. Balzer (fl. 1912)
- B.-A.Martin – Bernardin-Antoine Martin (1813–1897)
- Bân – Nguyên Tiên Bân (fl. 1973)
- Bancr. – Edward Nathaniel Bancroft (1772–1842)
- Bandara – A. R. Bandara (fl. 2015)
- Banfi – Enrico Augusto Banfi (born 1948)
- Banister – John Banister (1654–1692)
- Banks – Joseph Banks (1743–1820)
- Barb.-Boiss. – Caroline Barbey-Boissier (1847–1918)
- Barberá – Patricia Barberá (fl. 2014)
- Barberena – Felipe Fajardo V.A. Barberena (fl. 2010)
- Barbey – William Barbey (1842–1914)
- Barbhuiya – Hussain Ahmed Barbhuiya (born 1985)
- Barbosa – Luis Augusto Grandvaux Barbosa (1914–1983) (The spelling "Agosto" in some sources is incorrect.)
- Barb.Rodr. – João Barbosa Rodrigues (1842–1909)
- Barcelona – Julie F. Barcelona (fl. 1999)
- Bard.-Vauc. – Martine Bardot-Vaucoulon (born 1948)
- Barfuss – Michael Barfuss (born 1977)
- Barger – T. Wayne Barger (fl. 2016)
- Bargh. – Elso Sterrenberg Barghoorn (1915–1984)
- Barham – Henry Barham (c. 1670–1726)
- Barik – Saroj Kanta Barik (born 1965)
- Barker – George Barker (1776–1845)
- Barkworth – Mary Elizabeth Barkworth (born 1941)
- Barlow – Bryan Alwyn Barlow (born 1933)
- Barneby – Rupert Charles Barneby (1911–2000)
- Barnes – Charles Reid Barnes (1858–1910)
- Barnett – Euphemia Cowan Barnett (1890–1970)
- Barnhart – John Hendley Barnhart (1871–1949)
- Baron – P. Alexis Baron (born 1754)
- Barr – Peter Barr (1826–1909)
- Barrabé – Laure Barrabé (fl. 2011)
- Barrande – Joachim Barrande (1799–1883)
- Barratt – Joseph Barratt (1796–1882)
- Barratte – Jean François Gustave Barratte (1857–1920)
- Barrel. – Jacques Barrelier (1606–1673)
- Barroso – Liberato Joaquim Barroso (1900–1949)
- Barrow – Sir John Barrow, 1st Baronet (1764–1848)
- Bartal. – Biagio Bartalini (1746–1822)
- Bartel – Jim A. Bartel (fl. 1983)
- Bartell. – Veturia Bartelletti
- Barth – József Barth (1833–1915)
- Barthlott – Wilhelm Barthlott (born 1946)
- Barthol. – Elam Bartholomew (1852–1934)
- Barthol.-Began – Sharon Elaine Bartholomew-Began (born 1958)
- Bartl. – Friedrich Gottlieb Bartling (1798–1875)
- Bartlett – Harley Harris Bartlett (1886–1960)
- Bartley – Floyd Bartley (1888–1974)
- Bartoli – Antonella Bartoli (born 1943)
- Bartolo – Giuseppina Bartolo (born 1948)
- Bartolome – Marisa Bartolome (fl. 2002)
- Barton – Benjamin Smith Barton (1766–1815)
- Bartram – John Bartram (1699–1777)
- Bartsch – Johann Bartsch (1709–1738)
- Barulina – Elena Ivanovna Barulina (1896–1957)
- Bas – Cornelis (Kees) Bas (1928–2013)
- Basiner – Theodor Friedrich Julius Basiner (1816–1862)
- Bässler – Manfred Bässler (born 1935)
- Bastard – Toussaint Bastard (1784–1846)
- Bastian – Henry Charlton Bastian (1837–1915)
- Bastow – Richard Austin Bastow (1839–1920)
- Batalin – Alexander Theodorowicz Batalin (1847–1896)
- Bateman – James Bateman (1811–1897)
- Bates – John Mallory Bates (1846–1930)
- Batsch – August Johann Georg Karl Batsch (1761–1802)
- Batt. – Jules Aimé Battandier (1848–1922)
- Baudet – Jean C. Baudet (1944–2021)
- Baum – Hugo Baum (1867–1950)
- Baumann – Constantin Auguste Napoléon Baumann (1804–1884)
- Baum.-Bod. – Marcel Gustav Baumann-Bodenheim (1920–1996)
- Baumg. – Johann Christian Gottlob Baumgarten (1765–1843)
- Bäumler – Johann Andreas Bäumler (1847–1926)
- Baxter – William Baxter (1787–1871)
- Bayly – Michael James Bayly (born 1970)
- B.Baumann – Brigitte Baumann (born 1938)
- B.Bock – Benoit Bock (born 1972) (Benoît Bock)
- B.Boivin – Joseph Robert Bernard Boivin (1916–1985)
- B.Bremer – Birgitta Bremer (born 1950)
- B.Clément – B. Clément (fl. 2001)
- B.C.Stone – Benjamin Clemens Stone (1933–1994)
- B.D.Greene – Benjamin Daniel Greene (1793–1862)
- B.D.Jacks. – Benjamin Daydon Jackson (1846–1927)
- Beadle – Chauncey Delos Beadle (1856–1950)
- Beal – William James Beal (1833–1924)
- Bean – William Jackson Bean (1863–1947)
- Beard – John Stanley Beard (1916–2011)
- Beardslee – Henry Curtis Beardslee, Jr. (1865–1948) (son of Henry Curtis Beardslee, Sr. (1807–1884, abbrev. H.C.Beardslee))
- Beardsley – Paul M. Beardsley (fl. 2012)
- Beatley – Janice Carson Beatley (1919–1987)
- Beaton – Donald Beaton (1802-1863)
- Beattie – Rolla Kent Beattie (1875–1960)
- Beauverd – Gustave Beauverd (1867–1942)
- Beauverie – Jean Beauverie (1874–1938)
- Beauvis. – Georges Eugène Charles Beauvisage (1852–1925)
- Bebb – Michael Schuck Bebb (1833–1895)
- Becc. – Odoardo Beccari (1843–1920)
- Bechst. – Johann Matthäus Bechstein (1757–1822)
- Beck – Günther Beck von Mannagetta und Lerchenau (1856–1931)
- Becker – Johannes Becker (1769–1833)
- Beckh. – Konrad Beckhaus (1821–1890)
- Bedd. – Richard Henry Beddome (1830–1911)
- Bedevian – Armenag K. Bedevian (fl. 1936)
- Bedn.-Ochyra – Halina Bednarek-Ochyra (fl. 2000)
- Bedward – M. Bedward (fl. 1996)(fl. 1996)
- Beechey – Frederick William Beechey (1796–1856)
- Beeke – Henry Beeke (1751–1837)
- Beentje – Henk Jaap Beentje (born 1951)
- Beetle – Alan Ackerman Beetle (1913–2003)
- Bég. – Augusto Béguinot (1875–1940)
- Behnke – H.-Dietmar Behnke (fl. 1997)
- Behr – Hans Hermann Behr (1818–1904)
- Beier – Björn-Axel Beier (born 1965)
- Beilschm. – Carl Traugott Beilschmied (1793–1848)
- Beissn. – Ludwig Beissner (1843–1927)
- Beitel – Joseph M. Beitel (1952–1991)
- Bek. – Andrej Nikolaevich Beketow (1825–1902)
- Bellair – Georges Adolphe Bellair (1860–1939)
- Bellardi – Carlo Antonio Lodovico Bellardi (1741–1826)
- Bello – Domingo Bello y Espinosa (1817–1884)
- Belosersky – Nikola Belosersky (R.N. Belosersky, Nikolaj Ivanovič Belozerskij) (born 1879)
- Beneke – Everett Smith Beneke (1918–2010)
- Benj. – Ludwig Benjamin (1825–1848)
- Benke – Hermann Conrad Benke (1869–1946)
- Benl – Gerhard Benl (1910–2001)
- Benn. – John Joseph Bennett (1801–1876)
- Benner – Walter Mackinett Benner (1888–1970)
- Bennert – H. Wilfried Bennert (born 1945)
- Bennet – Sigamony Stephen Richard Bennet (1940–2009)
- Bennetts – William James Bennetts (1865–1920)
- Benniamin – Asir Benniamin (born 1976)
- Benny – Gerald Leonard Benny (born 1942)
- Benoist – Raymond Benoist (1881–1970)
- Benth. – George Bentham (1800–1884)
- Bentley – Robert Bentley (1821–1893)
- Bentv. – P. A. J. Bentvelzen (fl. 1962)
- Bentzer – Bengt Bentzer (born 1942)
- B.E.Pfeil – Bernard E. Pfeil (fl. 2000)
- Bequaert – Joseph Charles Bequaert (1886–1982)
- Berazaín – Rosalina Berazaín (born 1947)
- Bercht. – Friedrich von Berchtold (1781–1876)
- Berg – Ernst von Berg (1782–1855)
- Berger – Ernst Friedrich Berger (1814–1853)
- Bergey – David Hendricks Bergey (1860–1937)
- Berggr. – Sven Berggren (1837–1917)
- Bergmans – Johannes Baptista Bergmans (1892–1980)
- Bergon – Paul Bergon (1863–1912)
- Berjak – Patricia Berjak (1939–2015)
- Berk. – Miles Joseph Berkeley (1803–1889)
- Berkhout – Christine Marie Berkhout (1893–1932)
- Bernardi – Luciano Bernardi (1920–2001)
- Bernh. – Johann Jacob Bernhardi (1774–1850)
- Bernstein – Heinrich Agathon Bernstein (1828–1865)
- Bertero – Carlo Luigi Giuseppe Bertero (1789–1831)
- Berthault – François Berthault (1857–1916)
- Berthel. – Sabin Berthelot (1794–1880)
- Bertol. – Antonio Bertoloni (1775–1869)
- Bertoni – Moisés (de) Santiago (Mosè Giacomo) Bertoni (1857–1929)
- Besch. – Émile Bescherelle (1828–1903)
- Besser – Wilibald Swibert Joseph Gottlieb von Besser (1784–1842)
- Bessey – Charles Edwin Bessey (1845–1915)
- Best – George Newton Best (1846–1926)
- Betche – Daniel Ludwig Ernst Betche (1851–1913)
- Betancur – Julio Betancur (born 1960)
- Beurton – Christa Beurton (born 1945)
- Beuzev. – Wilfred Alexander Watt de Beuzeville (1884–1954)
- B.-E.van Wyk – Ben-Erik van Wyk (born 1956)
- Bews – John William Bews (1884–1938)
- Beyer – Rudolf Beyer (1852–1932)
- B.E.Young – B.E. Young (fl. 1985)
- Beyr. – Heinrich Karl Beyrich (1796–1834)
- B.F.Dana – Bliss F. Dana (born 1891)
- B.Fedtsch. – Boris Alexjewitsch Fedtschenko (1872–1947)
- B.F.Hansen – Bruce Frederick Hansen (born 1944)
- B.F.Holmgren – Björn Frithiofsson Holmgren (1872–1946)
- B.Field – Barron Field (1786–1846)
- B.G.Baldwin – Bruce Gregg Baldwin (born 1957)
- B.G.Bell – Bruce Graham Bell (born 1942)
- B.G.Briggs – Barbara Gillian Briggs (born 1934)
- B.Gray – Bruce Gray (born 1939)
- B.G.Schub. – Bernice Giduz Schubert (1913–2000)
- B.H.Allen – Bruce H. Allen (born 1952)
- B.Hansen – Bertel Hansen (1932–2005)
- Bhatti – Ghulam Raza Bhatti (born 1959)
- B.H.Buxton – Bertram Henry Buxton (1852–1934)
- B.Heyne – Benjamin Heyne (1770–1819)
- B.H.Long – Bayard Henry Long (1885–c. 1969)
- B.H.Macmill. – Bryony Hope Macmillan (born 1933)
- Bhujel – R.B. Bhujel (fl. 1994)
- B.H.Wilcox – Balafama Helen Wilcox (fl. 1977–1993)
- B.Hyland – Bernard Patrick Matthew Hyland (born 1937)
- Bianca – Giuseppe Bianca (1801–1883)
- Bianchi – Giovanni Bianchi (fl. 1907)
- Bianco – Pasqua Bianco (born 1927)
- Biasol. – Bartolomeo Biasoletto (1793–1859)
- Bidgood – Gillian Sally Bidgood (1948–2018)
- Bidwill – John Carne Bidwill (1815–1853)
- Biehler – Johann Friedrich Theodor Biehler (born c. 1785)
- Bien. – Theophil Joachim Heinrich Bienert (1833–1873)
- Bierh. – David William Bierhorst (1924–1997)
- Biffin – Edward Sturt Biffin (born 1967)
- Bigelow – Jacob Bigelow (1787–1879)
- Billb. – Gustaf Johan Billberg (1772–1844)
- Billot – Paul Constant Billot (1796–1863)
- Binn. – Simon Binnendijk (1821–1883)
- Birdw. – George Birdwood (1832–1917)
- Bisch. – Gottlieb Wilhelm T.G. Bischoff (1797–1854)
- Bischl. – Hélène Bischler (1932–2005)
- Bishop – David Bishop (1788–1849)
- Bisse – Johannes Bisse (1935–1984)
- Bisset – James Bisset (1843–1911)
- Biswas – Kalipada Biswas (1899–1969)
- Bitter – Friedrich August Georg Bitter (1873–1927)
- Bittrich – Volker Bittrich (born 1954)
- Biv. – Antonius de Bivoni-Bernardi (1774–1837)
- B.J.Conn – Barry John Conn (born 1948)
- B.J.Jacobsen – Barry J. Jacobsen (born 1947)
- B.J.Keighery – Bronwen Jean Keighery (born 1951)
- B.J.Pollard – Benedict John Pollard (born 1972)
- B.Juss. – Bernard de Jussieu (1699–1777)
- B.J.Wallace – Benjamin John Wallace (born 1947)
- B.K.Simon – Bryan Kenneth Simon (born 1943)
- B.K.Sinha – Bipin Kumar Sinha (born 1960)
- Black – Allan A. Black (1832–1865)
- Blackall – William Blackall (1876–1941)
- Blackmore – John A.P. Blackmore (born 1960)
- Blackw. – Elizabeth Blackwell (1707–1758)
- Blake – Joseph Blake (1814–1888)
- Blakelock – Ralph Anthony Blakelock (1915–1963)
- Blakely – William Blakely (1875–1941)
- Blakeslee – Albert Francis Blakeslee (1874–1954)
- Blakiston – Thomas Wright Blakiston (1832–1891)
- Blanch. – William Henry Blanchard (1850–1922)
- Blanco – Francisco Manuel Blanco (1778–1845)
- Blandow – Otto Christian Blandow (1778–1810)
- Blasdell – Robert Ferris Blasdell (1929–1996)
- Blatt. – Ethelbert Blatter (1877–1934)
- Blaxell – Donald Frederick Blaxell (born 1934)
- B.L.Burtt – Brian Lawrence Burtt (1913–2008)
- B.L.Chen – Bao Liang Chen (1942-1991)
- B.L.Clark – Bonnie Lynne Clark (born 1966)
- B.L.Linden – B. L. van der Linden (fl. 1959)
- Blochm. – Friedrich Blochmann (1858–1931)
- Błocki – Bronislaw Błocki (1857–1919)
- Bloemb. – Siebe Bloembergen (born 1905)
- Blom – Carl Magnus Blom (1737–1815)
- Blomb. – Olof Gotthard Blomberg (1838–1901)
- Blomgr. – Nils Harald Blomgren (1901–1926)
- Blomq. – Sven Gustaf Krister Gustafson Blomquist (1882–1953)
- Błoński – Franciszek Kzawery Błoński (1867–1910)
- Blossf. – Robert Blossfeld (1882–1945)
- B.L.Rob. – Benjamin Lincoln Robinson (1864–1935)
- B.L.Turner – Billie Lee Turner (1925–2020)
- Bluff – Mathias Joseph Bluff (1805–1837)
- Blume – Carl Ludwig Blume (1796–1862)
- Blytt – Matthias Numsen Blytt (1789–1862)
- B.M.Allen – Betty Eleanor Gosset Molesworth Allen (1913–2002)
- B.Mann – Benjamin Pickmann Mann (1848–1926)
- B.Mathew – Brian Frederick Mathew (born 1936)
- B.M.Barthol. – Bruce Monroe Bartholomew (born 1946)
- B.M.Boom – Brian M. Boom (born 1954)
- B.M.Davis – Bradley Moore Davis (1871–1957)
- B.Meeuse – Bastiaan Jacob Dirk Meeuse (1916–1999)
- B.Mey. – Bernhard Meyer (1767–1836)
- B.M.Wang – Bing Mou Wang ((fl. 2016))
- B.Nord. – Rune Bertil Nordenstam (born 1936)
- Boatwr. – James Stephen Boatwright (fl. 2007)
- Boccone – Paolo Silvio Boccone (1633–1704)
- Böcher – Tyge W. Böcher (1909–1983)
- Bockemühl – Leonore Bockemühl (1927–2007)
- Bocq. – Henri Théophile Bocquillon (1834–1883)
- B.O.Dodge – Bernard Ogilvie Dodge (1872–1960)
- Boeckeler – Johann Otto Boeckeler (1803–1899)
- Boed. – Friedrich Bödeker (1867–1937)
- Boehm. – Georg Rudolf Boehmer (1723–1803)
- Boerh. – Herman Boerhaave (1668–1738)
- Boenn. – Clemens von Bönninghausen (1785–1864)
- Boerl. – Jacob Gijsbert Boerlage (1849–1900)
- Bois – Désiré Georges Jean Marie Bois (1856–1946)
- Boiss. – Pierre Edmond Boissier (1810–1885)
- Boissev. – Charles Hercules Boissevain (1893–1946)
- Boitard – Pierre Boitard (1787–1859)
- Boiteau – Pierre Boiteau (1911–1980)
- Boivin – Louis Hyacinthe Boivin (1808–1852)
- Bojer – Wenceslas Bojer (1795–1856)
- Bol. – Henry Nicholas Bolander (1831–1897)
- Boland – Douglas John Boland (born 1947)
- Bo Li – Bo Li (1929–1998)
- Bold. – Isaäc Boldingh (1879–1938)
- Bolle – Carl Bolle (1821–1909)
- Bolley – Henry Luke Bolley (1865–1956)
- B.Øllg. – Benjamin Øllgaard (born 1943)
- Bolton – James Bolton (1735–1799)
- Bolus – Harry Bolus (1834–1911)
- Bomhard – Miriam Lucile Bomhard (1898–1952)
- Bonaf. – Matthieu Bonafous (1793–1852)
- Bonap. – Roland Napoléon Bonaparte (1858–1924)
- Bondar – Gregório Bondar (1881–1959)
- Bong. – August Gustav Heinrich von Bongard (1786–1839)
- Bonif. – José M. Bonifacino (fl. 2004)
- Bonnem. – Théophile Bonnemaison (1774–1829)
- Bonnier – Gaston Eugène Marie Bonnier (1853–1922)
- Bonpl. – Aimé Bonpland (1773–1858)
- Boom – Boudewijn Karel Boom (1903–1980)
- Boomsma – Clifford David Boomsma (1915–2004)
- Boos – Joseph Boos (1794–1879)
- Boothman – H. Stuart Boothman (fl. 1934)
- Boott – Francis Boott (1792–1863)
- Bor – Norman Loftus Bor (1893–1972)
- Borbás – Vinczé von Borbás (1844–1905)
- Borchs. – Finn Borchsenius (born 1959)
- Boreau – Alexandre Boreau (1803–1875)
- Børgesen – Fredrik Christian Emil Børgesen (1866–1956)
- Borhidi – Attila Borhidi (born 1932)
- Boriss. – Antonina Georgievna Borissova (1903–1970)
- Borkh. – Moritz (Moriz) Balthasar Borkhausen (1760–1806)
- Börner – Carl Julius Bernhard Börner (1880–1953)
- Bornm. – Joseph Friedrich Nicolaus Bornmüller (1862–1948)
- Borrer – William Borrer (1781–1862)
- Borsch – Thomas Borsch (born 1969)
- Borss.Waalk. – Jan van Borssum Waalkes (1922–1985)
- Bory – Jean Baptiste Bory de Saint-Vincent (1778–1846)
- Borza – Alexandru Borza (1887–1971)
- Borzì – Antonino Borzì (1852–1921)
- Bos – Jan Just Bos (1939–2003)
- Bosc – Louis Augustin Guillaume Bosc (1759–1828)
- Bosch – Roelof Benjamin van den Bosch (1810–1862)
- Boss. – Pierre Bosserdet (fl. 1970)
- Bosser – Jean Marie Bosser (1922–2013)
- Bostock – Peter Dundas Bostock (born 1949)
- Botsch. – Victor Petrovič Botschantzev (1910–1990)
- Botschantz. – Zinaida Botschantzeva (1907–1973)
- Botta – Silvia Margarita Botta (1942–1994)
- Bouchard – Jean Bouchard (fl. 1951)
- Boucher – Jules Armand Guillaume Boucher de Crèvecœur (1757–1844)
- Boud. – Jean Louis Émile Boudier (1828–1920)
- Boufford – David Edward Boufford (born 1941)
- Boulay – Jean Nicolas Boulay (1837–1905)
- Boulenger – George Albert Boulenger (1858–1937)
- Boulger – George Edward Simmonds Boulger (1853–1922)
- Boulos – Loutfy Boulos (born 1932)
- Boulter – Michael Charles Boulter (1942–2025)
- Bourd. – Thomas Fulton Bourdillon (1849–1930)
- Bourdon – M. Bourdon (fl. 1986)
- Bourdot – Hubert Bourdot (1861–1937)
- Bourdu – Robert Bourdu (fl. 1957)
- Bowden – Wray Merrill Bowden (born 1914)
- Bower – Frederick Orpen Bower (1855–1948)
- Bowles – Edward Augustus Bowles (1865–1954)
- Bowman – John Eddowes Bowman the Elder (1785–1841)
- Braarud – Trygve Braarud (1903–1985)
- Brace – Lewis Jones Knight Brace (1852–1938)
- Bracelin – Nina Floy Bracelin (1890–1973)
- Brach – Anthony Robert Brach (born 1963)
- Brack. – William Dunlop Brackenridge (1810–1893)
- Brade – Alexander Curt Brade (1881–1971)
- Bradley – Richard Bradley (1688–1732)
- Braem – Guido Jozef Braem (born 1944)
- Braggins – John E. Braggins (born 1944)
- Brainerd – Ezra Brainerd (1844–1924)
- Braithw. – Robert Braithwaite (1824–1917)
- Brako – Lois Brako (born 1950)
- Bramwell – David Bramwell (1942–2022)
- Brand – August Brand (1863–1930)
- Brandão – Mitzi Brandão (fl. 1990)
- Brandbyge – John Brandbyge (born 1953)
- Brandegee – Townshend Stith Brandegee (1843–1925)
- Brandenburg – David M. Brandenburg (born 1953)
- Brandis – Dietrich Brandis (1824–1907)
- Branner – John Casper Branner (1850–1922)
- B.R.Arrill. – Blanca Renée Arrillaga (1917–2011)
- Brassard – Guy Raymond Brassard (born 1943)
- Bräuchler – Christian Bräuchler (born 1975)
- Brauer – David F. Brauer (fl. 1980)
- Braun – Karl Friedrich Wilhelm Braun (1800–1864)
- Braun-Blanq. – Josias Braun-Blanquet (1884–1980) (was Josias Braun until 1915)
- Brause – Guido Georg Wilhelm Brause (1847–1922)
- Bravo – Helia Bravo Hollis (1901–2001)
- B.R.Baum – Bernard René Baum (born 1937)
- Brearley – Darren R. Brearley (fl. 2019)
- Bréb. – Louis Alphonse de Brébisson (1798–1872)
- Breda – Jacob Gijsbert Samuel van Breda (1788–1867)
- Breedlove – Dennis Eugene Breedlove (1939–2012)
- Breen (also Schornh.) – Ruth Olive Schornhurst Breen (1905–1987)
- B.Rees – Bertha Rees (1880–1957)
- Bref. – Julius Oscar Brefeld (1839–1925)
- Brehm – Joachim Brehm (1789–1860)
- Breistr. – Maurice A. F. Breistroffer (1910–1986)
- Breitw. – Ilse Breitwieser (fl. 1986)
- Bremek. – Cornelis Eliza Bertus Bremekamp (1888–1984)
- Brenan – John Patrick Micklethwait Brenan (1917–1985)
- Brenckle – Jacob Frederic Brenckle (1875–1958)
- Breton – André Breton (fl. 1964)
- Bretschn. – Emil Bretschneider (1833–1901)
- Brett – Robert Lindsay Gordon Brett (1898–1975)
- Brewer – James Alexander Brewer (1818–1886))
- B.Rice – Barry Rice (fl. 2011)
- Brickell – Christopher David Brickell (born 1932)
- Brid. – Samuel Élisée von Bridel (1761–1828)
- Bridson – Diane Mary Bridson (born 1942)
- Brieger – Friedrich Gustav Brieger (1900–1985)
- Bright – John Bright (1872–1952)
- Brign. – Giovanni de Brignoli di Brunnhoff (1774–1857)
- Brinda – John Carroll Brinda born 1973
- Briq. – John Isaac Briquet (1870–1931)
- Bristow – Henry William Bristow (1817–1889)
- Brittan – Norman Henry Brittan (born 1920)
- Britten – James Britten (1846–1924)
- Brittinger – Christian Casimir Brittinger (1795–1869)
- Britton – Nathaniel Lord Britton (1859–1934)
- B.R.Keener – Brian Reid Keener (born 1973)
- G.Brockman – Garry Brockman (born 1954)
- Bromf. – William Arnold Bromfield (1801–1851)
- Bromhead – Edward Ffrench Bromhead (1789–1855)
- Brongn. – Adolphe-Théodore Brongniart (1801–1876)
- Brooker – Ian Brooker (1934–2016)
- Brooks – Cecil Joslin Brooks (1875–1953)
- Broome – Christopher Edmund Broome (1812–1886)
- Brophy – Joe Brophy (fl. 2013)
- Brot. – Félix Avelar Brotero (1744–1828)
- Broth. – Viktor Ferdinand Brotherus (1849–1929)
- Broughton – Arthur Broughton (c. 1758–1796)
- Brouillet – Luc Brouillet (born 1954)
- Brouss. – Pierre Marie Auguste Broussonet (1761–1807)
- Browicz – Kazimierz Browicz (1925–2009)
- Browning – J. Browning (fl. 1994)
- Brownsey – Patrick J. Brownsey (1948–2023)
- B.R.Paterson – Betsy Rivers Paterson (born 1935)
- B.R.Ramesh – B. R. Ramesh (fl. 1993)
- Bruch – Philipp Bruch (1781–1847)
- Brücher – Heinz Brücher (1915–1991)
- Brug. – Jean Guillaume Bruguière (1749/1750–1798)
- Brügger – Christian Georg Brügger (1833–1899)
- Brugmans – Sebald Justinus Brugmans (1763–1819)
- Brühl – Paul Johannes Brühl (1855–1935)
- Bruijn – Ary Johannes De Bruijn (1811–1896)
- Brullo – Salvatore Brullo (born 1947)
- Brummitt – Richard Kenneth Brummitt (1937–2013)
- Brumpt – Émile Josef Alexander Brumpt (1877–1951)
- Brunch. – Jørgen Brunchorst (or Jörgen Brunchorst) (1862–1917)
- Bruneau – Anne Bruneau (born 1959)
- Brunet – Louis-Ovide Brunet (1826–1876)
- Brunfels – Otto Brunfels (1488–1534)
- Brunner – Carl Brunner von Wattenwyl (1823–1914)
- Brunnth. – Josef Brunnthaler (1871–1914)
- Brunsfeld – Steven John Brunsfeld (1953–2006)
- Bruyl. – Julia Bruylants (1890–1974)
- Bruyns – Peter Vincent Bruyns (born 1957)
- Bryhn – Niels Bryhn (1854–1916)
- B.Schenk – Bernhard Schenk (1833–1893)
- B.Schmid – B. Schmid (fl. 1983)
- B.S.Williams – Benjamin Samuel Williams (1824–1890)
- Bubák – František Bubák (1865–1925)
- Bubani – Pietro Bubani (1806–1888)
- Buchanan – John Buchanan (1819–1898)
- Buchenau – Franz Georg Philipp Buchenau (1831–1906)
- Buch.-Ham. – Francis Buchanan-Hamilton (1762–1829)
- Bucholtz – Feodor (Fedor) Vladimirovic Bucholtz (1872–1924)
- Buc'hoz – Pierre Joseph Buc'hoz (1731–1807)
- Buckland – William Buckland (1784–1856)
- Buckley – Samuel Botsford Buckley (1809–1884)
- Buddle – Adam Buddle (1662–1715)
- Buerki – Sven Buerki (fl. 2006)
- Buhse – Friedrich Alexander Buhse (1821–1898)
- Bui – Ngoc-Sanh Bui (fl. 1964)
- Buining – Albert Frederik Hendrik Buining (1901–1976)
- Buirchell – Bevan Buirchell (born 1951)
- Bull. – Jean Baptiste François Pierre Bulliard (1742–1793)
- Buller – Arthur Henry Reginald Buller (1879–1944)
- Bullock – Arthur Allman Bullock (1906–1980)
- Bunbury – Charles James Fox Bunbury, 8th Baronet (1809–1886)
- Bunge – Alexander Andrejewitsch von Bunge (1803–1890)
- Burb. – Frederick William Burbidge (1847–1905)
- Burbank – Luther Burbank (1849–1926)
- Burch. – William John Burchell (1781–1863)
- Burck – William Burck (1848–1910)
- Burdet – Hervé Maurice Burdet (born 1939)
- Bureau – Louis Édouard Bureau (1830–1918)
- Burges – Norman Alan Burges (1911–2002)
- Burgess – Henry W. Burgess (fl. 1827–1833)
- Burgman – Mark A. Burgman (born 1956)
- Burkill – Isaac Henry Burkill (1870–1965)
- Burl. – Gertrude Simmons Burlingham (1872–1952)
- Burle-Marx – Roberto Burle Marx (1909–1994)
- Burm. – Johannes Burman (1707–1779)
- Burm.f. – Nicolaas Laurens Burman (1734–1793)
- Burnat – Émile Burnat (1828–1920)
- Burnett – Gilbert Thomas Burnett (1800–1835)
- Burret – Max Burret (1883–1964)
- Burrill – Thomas Jonathan Burrill (1839–1916)
- Burrows – Elsie May Burrows (1913–1986)
- Burtt – Bernard Dearman Burtt (1902–1938)
- Burtt Davy – Joseph Burtt Davy (1870–1940)
- Bury – Priscilla Susan Bury (1799–1872)
- Buscal. – Luigi Buscalioni (1863–1954)
- Buscumb – Carrie Buscumb (fl. 2007)
- Büse – Lodewijk Hendrik Büse (1819–1888)
- Buser – Robert Buser (1857–1931)
- Bush – Benjamin Franklin Bush (1858–1937)
- Busse – Walter Carl Otto Busse (1868–1933)
- Bussmann – Rainer W. Bussmann (born 1967)
- Büttner – Oscar Alexander Richard Büttner (1858–1927)
- Butzin – Friedhelm Reinhold Butzin (born 1936)
- Buxb. – Franz Buxbaum (1900–1979)
- Buxton – Richard Buxton (1786–1865)
- Buyss. – Robert du Buysson (1861–1946)
- B.Vogel – Benedict Christian Vogel (1745–1825)
- B.Walln. – Bruno Wallnöfer (born 1960)
- B.Whittier – Barbara Whittier
- B.Wood – Bertha Wood (fl. 1910)
- B.W.Phillips – Barry W. Phillips (fl. 2011)
- B.W.van Ee – Benjamin William van Ee (born 1975)
- B.Y.Geng – Bao-Yin Geng (fl. 1985)
- Byles – Ronald Stewart Byles (fl. 1957)
- Byng – James W. Byng (fl. 2014)
- Byrne – Margaret Mary Byrne (born 1960)
- Byrnes – Norman Brice Byrnes (1922–1998)
- Bytebier – Benny Bytebier (born 1961)

== C–Z ==
Contents: Top	A	B	C	D	E F	G	H	I J	K L	M	N O	P	Q R	S	T U V	W X Y Z

To find entries for C–Z, use the table of contents above.

== See also ==
- List of South African plant botanical authors
- List of botanists
- Category:Botanists
- List of Russian botanists
- List of zoologists by author abbreviation
