= Richard Büttner =

German botanist and mineralogist

Oskar Alexander Richard Büttner (28 September 1858 – 11 September 1927) was a German botanist and mineralogist who was involved in the exploration of the Congo Basin.

== Life ==
Büttner was born in Brandenburg on 28 September 1858. He studied in Berlin, where he received his doctorate in 1883 with his dissertation Flora advena marchica.

Büttner was a scientific participant in the German Congo Expedition of the African Society in Germany (1884–1886), which, under the direction of Eduard Schulze, was to serve the "exploration of the southern Congo Basin". It penetrated into areas unexplored from a European point of view. In 1890 he wrote Reisen im Kongolande about his travels. From 1890 to 1891 he was in charge of a research station in Bismarckburg, Togo. The station had been founded in June 1888 by the explorer Ludwig Wolf and named after the German chancellor Otto von Bismarck. At that time, the station consisted of nine adobe buildings arranged in a rectangle. Büttner had a palisade fence built for fortification.

After his return to Berlin Büttner worked as a teacher. There he founded the first chair for African languages in Germany. He died in Berlin-Karlshorst.

== Legacy ==
Some species were described according to Büttner's evidence, and he himself described Xyris congensis. Aloe buettneri and the Togo mouse (Leimacomys buettneri) were named after him. Büttner is commemorated in the scientific name of a species of African lizard, Trachylepis buettneri. The standard author abbreviation Büttner is used to indicate this person as the author when citing a botanical name.

== Publications ==
- Karsch, Ferdinand (1893). "Die Insekten der Berglandschaft Adeli im Hinterlande von Togo (Westafrika) nach dem von den Herrn Hauptmann Eugen Kling (1888 und 1889) und Dr. Richard Büttner (1890 und 1891) gesammelten Materiale. Springheuschrecken – Orthoptera Saltatoria – von Adeli. I. Abtheilung: Apterygota, Odonata, Orthoptera Saltatoria, Lepidoptera Rhopalocera". Berliner Entomologische Zeitschrift (in German). 38: 1–266.
- Büttner, Richard (1890). Reisen durch das Kongogebiet. Ausgeführt im Auftrage der Afrikanischen Gesellschaft in Deutschland. Leipzig: Hinrichsen. p. 283.

== Sources ==
- Beolens, Bo; Watkins, Michael; Grayson, Michael (2009). The Eponym Dictionary of Mammals. Baltimore: Johns Hopkins University Press. pp. xiii + 579. ISBN 978-0-8018-9304-9.
- Beolens, Bo; Watkins, Michael; Grayson, Michael (2011). The Eponym Dictionary of Reptiles. Baltimore: Johns Hopkins University Press. pp. xiii + 296. ISBN 978-1-4214-0135-5.
- Fabian, Johannes (2000). Out of Our Minds. Oakland: University of California Press.
- "Reise des Hauptmanns Kling von Lome über Salaga nach Bismarckburg im Sommer 1891". Mitteilungen von Forschungsreisenden und Gelehrten aus den deutschen Schutzgebieten (in German). 5. 1892.
- Schmit, Rochus (1898). Deutschlands Kolonien (in German). Vol. 2. Reprint by Weltbild Verlag. Augsburg 1998. Berlin: Verlag des Vereins der Bücherfreunde Schall & Grund.
- Wagenitz, Gerhard (2009). Die Erforscher der Pflanzenwelt von Berlin und Brandenburg (Booklet) (in German). Verh. Bot. Ver. Berlin Brandenburg.
- "Wolf, Ludwig". Deutsches Kolonial-Lexikon (in German). 1920. Archived from the original on 2015-12-21.
