= Bismarckburg =

Bismarckburg is a placename formerly applied to locations in Germany's African colonies. It may refer to

- Bismarckburg, Togo
- Bismarckburg, German East Africa, now Kasanga, Tanzania
