= Bomhard =

Bomhard is a surname. Notable people with the surname include:

- Allan R. Bomhard (born 1943), American linguist
- Adolf von Bomhard (1891–1976), German army and police officer
- Miriam Lucile Bomhard (1898–1952), American conservationist and botanist
- Stefan Bomhard (born 1967/68), German businessman
