= Malinvaud =

Malinvaud is a French surname. Notable people with the surname include:

- Edmond Malinvaud (1923–2015), French economist
- Louis Jules Ernest Malinvaud (1836–1913), French physician and botanist
