= Pierre Marie Édouard Lamy de la Chapelle =

French botanist

Pierre Marie Édouard Lamy de la Chapelle (1804, Limoges – 23 September 1886) was a French botanist, and notably a bryologist.

Lamy de la Chapelle is known for botanical investigations of Haute-Vienne. In his research he collaborated with botanist Louis Jules Ernest Malinvaud (1836–1913).

In 1841, he edited the exsiccata Flora Galliae et Germaniae exsiccata which was later continued by Paul Constant Billot.

In 1866, he became a member of the "Société botanique de France". His herbarium, the Herbier Pierre Marie Edouard Lamy de la Chapelle is housed at the Institut des Herbiers Universitaires in Clermont-Ferrand.

The moss species, Didymodon lamyanus and Trichostomum lamyanum are named after him.

He is member of the family Lamy de La Chapelle.

== Writings ==
- Mousses et hépatiques du département de la Haute-Vienne, 1875 - Mosses and hepatics of the department of Haute-Vienne.
- Mousses et hépatiques du Mont-Dore, 1875 - Mosses and hepatics of Mont-Dore.
- Mousses et hépatiques du Mont-Dore et de la Haute-Vienne, 1878 - Mosses and hepatics of Mont-Dore and in Haute-Vienne.
- Invasion dans la Haute-Vienne de la maladie de la vigne dite le Mildiou, 1882 - treatise on mildew affecting vines in Haute-Vienne.
