= Jacob Utsch =

German physician and botanist

Jacob Utsch (8 September 1824, Erndtebrück – 3 August 1901, Freudenberg) was a German physician and botanist, who specialized in the plant genus Rubus.

He studied medicine at the Universities of Bonn, Marburg, Halle and Berlin, obtaining his doctorate at the latter institution in 1849. From 1852 he practiced medicine in Freudenberg, where he later attained the title of Sanitätsrat. As a botanist he collected specimens mainly in the vicinity of Freudenberg.

In 1896 he published a work on Rubus hybrids titled Hybriden im Genus Rubus. He is also known for his treatment of the genus Rubus in Konrad Beckhaus's comprehensive Flora von Westfalen ("Flora of Westphalia", 1893).
