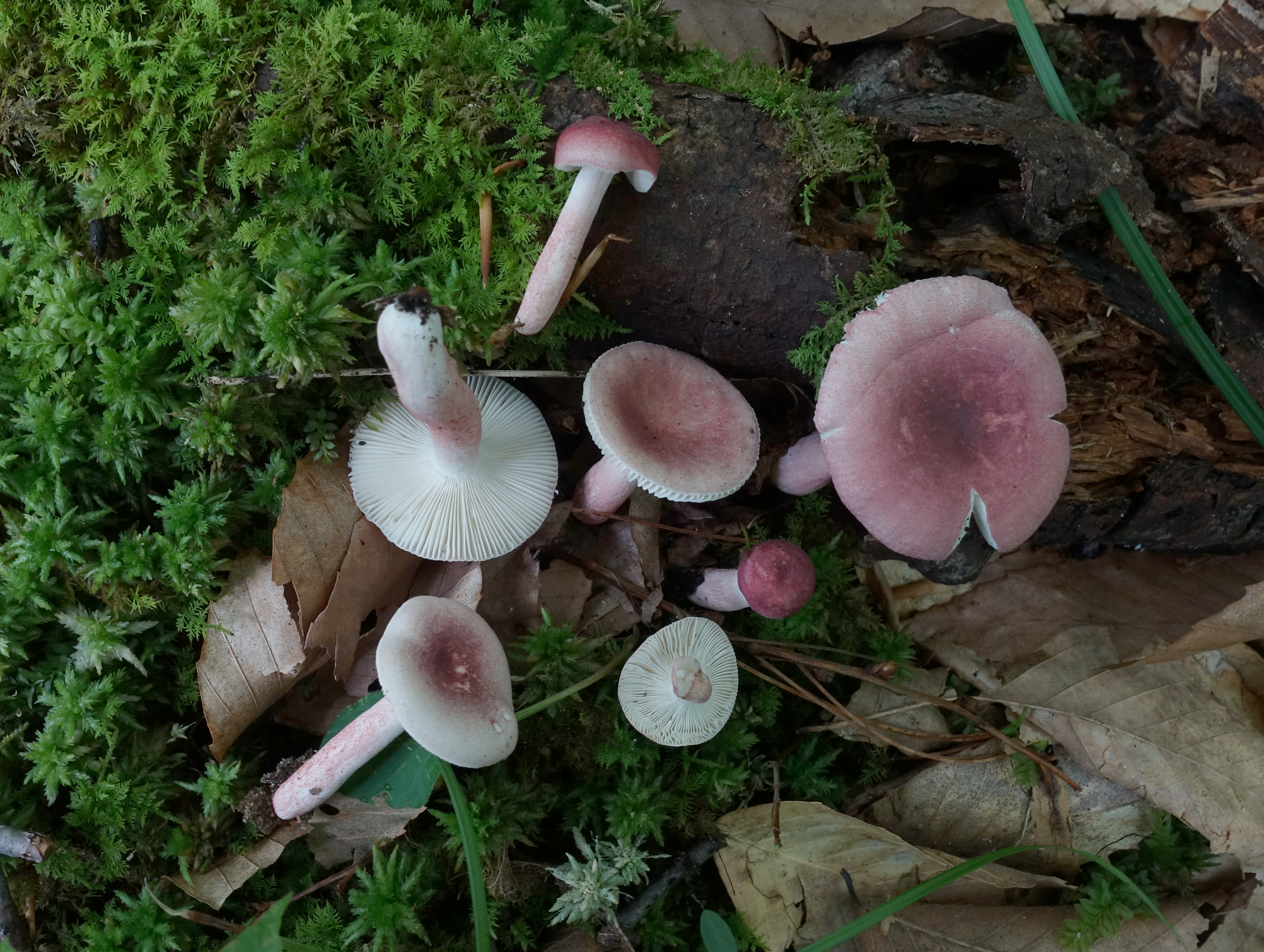

Scientific classification
- Domain: Eukaryota
- Kingdom: Fungi
- Division: Basidiomycota
- Class: Agaricomycetes
- Order: Russulales
- Family: Russulaceae
- Genus: Russula
- Species: R. subtilis

Binomial name
- Russula subtilis Burl.

= Russula subtilis =

Species of fungus

Russula subtilis is a basidiomycete mushroom of the genus Russula native to North America. Its flesh smells of parsley.

== See also ==
- List of Russula species
