= Russula mordax =

Scientific classification
- Kingdom: Fungi
- Division: Basidiomycota
- Class: Agaricomycetes
- Order: Russulales
- Family: Russulaceae
- Genus: Russula
- Species: R. mordax

Binomial name
- Russula mordax Burl.

Species of fungus

Russula mordax
- Mycological characteristics
- Gills on hymenium
- Cap is convex or depressed
- Hymenium is adnexed
- Stipe is bare
- Spore print is ochre to yellow
- Edibility is unknown

Russula mordax, commonly known as the biting russula or biting brittlegill, is a species of mushroom in the family Russulaceae.

== Description ==
The cap of Russula mordax is variable, and can be reddish, orangish, yellowish, or brownish. It is about 4-10 centimeters in diameter. It starts out convex and becomes broadly convex, flat, or depressed as the mushroom gets older. The gills are cream-colored and adnexed. The stipe is about 8 centimeters long and 3 centimeters wide. It is white and often has red splotching on the lower part. The spore print is yellowish ochre. This mushroom has a strong acrid taste, and may be poisonous.

== Habitat and ecology ==
Russula mordax is mycorrhizal. It is found in under western hemlock and douglas fir in coniferous forests.
