= Lingen, Germany =

Lingen (Ems)
- Town
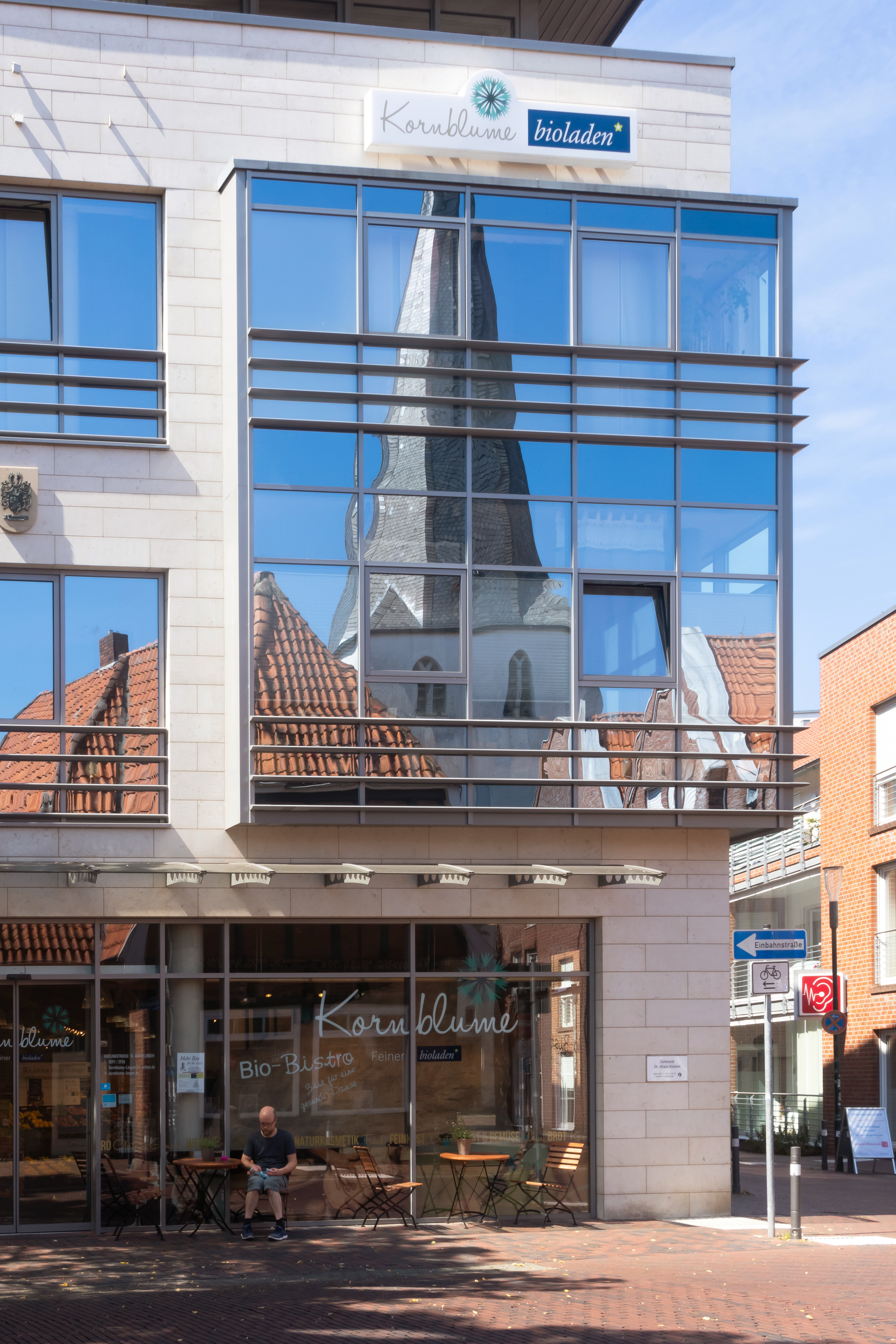
- Reformed church mirrored in the Kornblume windows

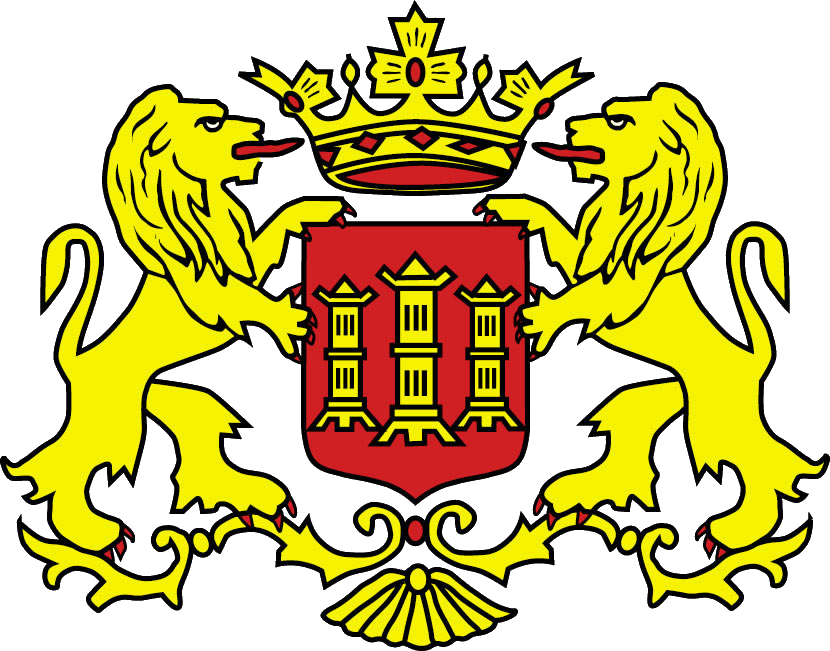
- Coat of arms

- Location of Lingen (Ems) within Emsland district
- Interactive map of Lingen (Ems)
- Location within Germany Location within Lower Saxony
- Coordinates: 52°31′23″N 7°19′23″E
- Country: Germany
- State: Lower Saxony
- District: Emsland

Government
  - Mayor (2026–31): Jens Hofschröer (CDU)

Area
  - Total: 176.19 km^{2} (68.03 sq mi)
- Elevation: 24 m (79 ft)

Population (2025-12-31)
  - Total: 56,539
  - Density: 320.90/km^{2} (831.12/sq mi)
- Time zone: UTC+01:00 (CET)
  - Summer (DST): UTC+02:00 (CEST)
- Vehicle registration: EL
- Website: lingen.de

Lingen (German pronunciation: [ˈlɪŋən]), officially Lingen (Ems), is a town in Lower Saxony, Germany. In 2024, its population was 59,896 with 2,262 people who had registered the city as their secondary residence. Lingen, specifically "Lingen (Ems)" is located on the river Ems in the southern part of the Emsland District, which borders North Rhine-Westphalia in the south and the Netherlands in the west.

== History ==
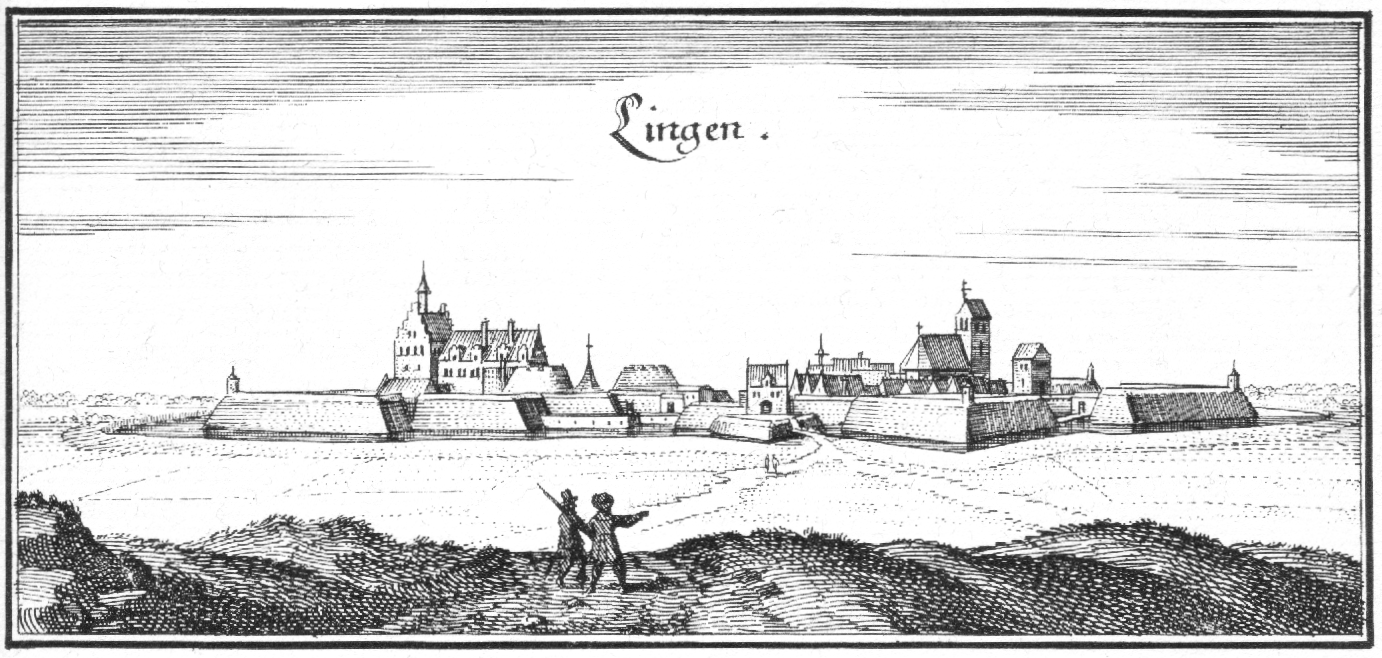
Lingen in 1647

Lingen was first mentioned in the Middle Ages (975 AD). From 804 to 1180 the region was part of the Duchy of Saxony inside the Carolingian Empire, and then remained part of the German-speaking Holy Roman Empire until 1806. A initially independent county of Lingen (Grafschaft Lingen) was erected in 1388 and remained until 1713, when Prussia took over. In detail though, the county and city in the 17th and 18th were repeatedly conquered by Dutch and Spanish troops: initially Catholic, from 1541 to 1547 the citizens were forced to become Lutheran, then the troops of Catholic Charles V conquered the county and city and in 1550 gave it to his sister Mary, Governor of the Habsburg Netherlands. From 1555 to 1597 Lingen was the easternmost point of the Spanish Empire of Philip II and became part of the Eighty Years' War. From 1597 to 1605 Lingen was conquered by the Calvinist and Dutch Union of Utrecht, then retaken by the Catholic Spanish troops and from 1632 to 1672 again was part of the Calvinist Union of Utrecht. For two years the Prince-Bishopric of Münster had the city, which then from 1674 to 1713 was part of the Calvinist Union of Utrecht again, when Frederick I of Prussia inherited the county. From 1807 to 1813 the troops of Napoleon Bonaparte occupied the region, and from 1810 to 1813 Lingen was part of France. In 1814 it again was part of Prussia, and in 1815 became part of the newly founded kingdom of Hanover. As result of the Austro-Prussian War in 1866 the kingdom of Hanover and also Lingen were annexed by the kingdom of Prussia, and in 1871 became part of the German Empire.

== Economy and education ==
Lingen is known for its offshore- and nuclear industry (Emsland Nuclear Power Plant). The University of Applied Sciences Osnabrueck has set up a branch campus, located in the centre of Lingen, with the three Institutes for Management and Engineering, Communications Management and Teaching of Theatre. In 2000 the institutes in Lingen merged into the Faculty of Society and Technology.

== Climate ==
Lingen has an oceanic climate (Köppen: Cfb; Trewartha: Dobk). On 25 July 2019, Lingen set the record for the hottest temperature ever recorded within Germany with a daytime high temperature of 42.6 degrees Celsius (109 degrees Fahrenheit) during a heat wave affecting much of Europe.

The Lingen weather station has recorded the following extreme values:

- Its highest temperature was 42.6 °C (108.7 °F) on 25 July 2019.
- Its lowest temperature was −20.5 °C (−4.9 °F) on 16 February 1956.
- Its greatest annual precipitation was 1,081.2 mm (42.57 in) in 1993.
- Its least annual precipitation was 466.2 mm (18.35 in) in 1959.
- The longest annual sunshine was 1917.1 hours in 1959.
- The shortest annual sunshine was 1206.3 hours in 1956.

Climate data for Lingen (1991–2020 normals, extremes 1951–2020)
Month	Jan	Feb	Mar	Apr	May	Jun	Jul	Aug	Sep	Oct	Nov	Dec	Year
Record high °C (°F)	15.1 (59.2)	20.4 (68.7)	24.7 (76.5)	30.3 (86.5)	34.2 (93.6)	36.7 (98.1)	42.6 (108.7)	37.8 (100.0)	33.8 (92.8)	28.3 (82.9)	20.2 (68.4)	16.4 (61.5)	42.6 (108.7)
Mean maximum °C (°F)	11.8 (53.2)	12.9 (55.2)	18.1 (64.6)	23.5 (74.3)	27.5 (81.5)	31.0 (87.8)	32.2 (90.0)	31.7 (89.1)	26.5 (79.7)	21.3 (70.3)	15.6 (60.1)	12.3 (54.1)	34.2 (93.6)
Mean daily maximum °C (°F)	5.1 (41.2)	6.0 (42.8)	9.8 (49.6)	14.7 (58.5)	18.7 (65.7)	21.3 (70.3)	23.6 (74.5)	23.2 (73.8)	19.5 (67.1)	14.3 (57.7)	9.1 (48.4)	5.6 (42.1)	14.3 (57.7)
Daily mean °C (°F)	2.8 (37.0)	3.1 (37.6)	5.8 (42.4)	9.8 (49.6)	13.6 (56.5)	16.3 (61.3)	18.5 (65.3)	18.0 (64.4)	14.6 (58.3)	10.3 (50.5)	6.4 (43.5)	3.4 (38.1)	10.2 (50.4)
Mean daily minimum °C (°F)	0.4 (32.7)	0.4 (32.7)	2.3 (36.1)	5.0 (41.0)	8.6 (47.5)	11.3 (52.3)	13.8 (56.8)	13.4 (56.1)	10.6 (51.1)	6.9 (44.4)	3.8 (38.8)	1.1 (34.0)	6.5 (43.7)
Mean minimum °C (°F)	−7.5 (18.5)	−6.4 (20.5)	−3.5 (25.7)	−1.5 (29.3)	2.1 (35.8)	6.1 (43.0)	8.9 (48.0)	8.7 (47.7)	5.0 (41.0)	0.6 (33.1)	−2.3 (27.9)	−6.3 (20.7)	−10.0 (14.0)
Record low °C (°F)	−19.8 (−3.6)	−20.5 (−4.9)	−13.1 (8.4)	−5.9 (21.4)	−2.2 (28.0)	0.8 (33.4)	5.4 (41.7)	4.5 (40.1)	1.3 (34.3)	−5.6 (21.9)	−9.8 (14.4)	−16.0 (3.2)	−20.5 (−4.9)
Average precipitation mm (inches)	68.6 (2.70)	51.9 (2.04)	53.9 (2.12)	42.5 (1.67)	58.2 (2.29)	67.5 (2.66)	82.4 (3.24)	73.6 (2.90)	71.7 (2.82)	66.6 (2.62)	65.9 (2.59)	68.8 (2.71)	771.5 (30.37)
Average extreme snow depth cm (inches)	3.5 (1.4)	3.0 (1.2)	1.3 (0.5)	0.1 (0.0)	0 (0)	0 (0)	0 (0)	0 (0)	0 (0)	0 (0)	0.8 (0.3)	3.4 (1.3)	7.0 (2.8)
Average precipitation days (≥ 1.0 mm)	18.5	16.3	16.0	14.0	14.8	14.7	16.0	16.1	15.2	16.2	18.2	19.0	194.9
Average snowy days (≥ 1.0 cm)	4.3	3.7	1.4	0	0	0	0	0	0	0	0.5	4.1	14
Average relative humidity (%)	86.6	83.8	78.6	71.4	71.4	73.1	74.4	76.3	81.2	84.8	88.1	88.6	79.9
Mean monthly sunshine hours	47.4	65.9	117.1	163.2	195.6	195.0	202.0	184.4	136.3	102.0	53.0	43.9	1,515.8
Source 1: World Meteorological Organization
Source 2: Deutscher Wetterdienst / SKlima.de

== Twin towns – sister cities ==
Lingen is twinned with:

- Bielawa, Poland
- Burton upon Trent / East Staffordshire, England, United Kingdom
- Elbeuf, France
- Marienberg, Germany
- Salt, Spain
- Lanivtsi, Ukraine

== Transport ==
- Lingen (Ems) station

== Notable people ==
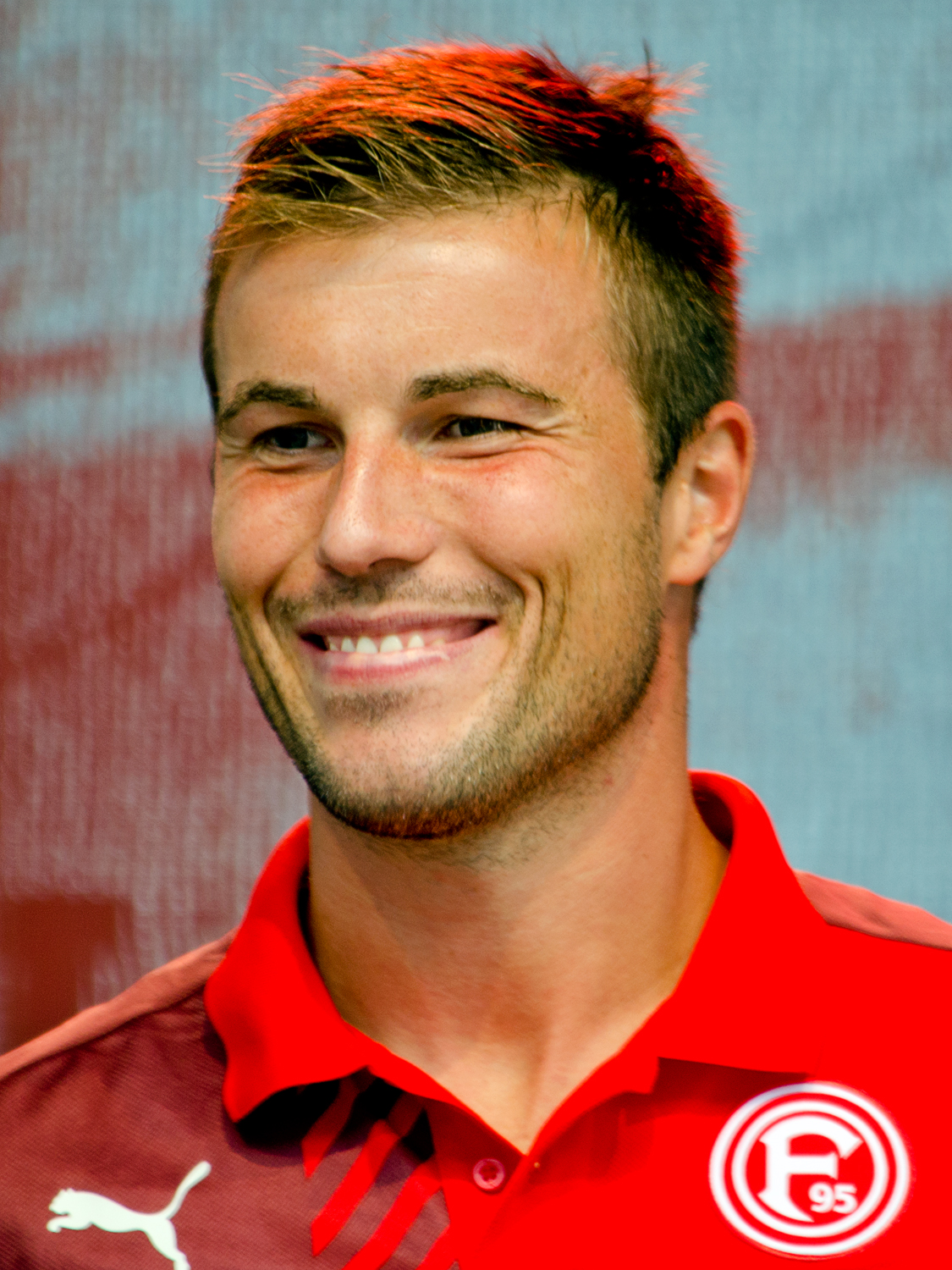
Michael Rensing, 2015

- Eberhard von Danckelmann (1643–1722), Prime Minister of Brandenburg-Prussia from 1692 to 1697
- Theodorus Jacobus Frelinghuysen (c.1691–c.1747), German-American Dutch-Reformed minister and theologian.
- Konrad Beckhaus (1821–1890), Protestant clergyman and botanist
- Hermann Wilhelm Berning (1877–1955), Bishop of Osnabrück 1914–1955
- Herms Niel (1888–1954), composer of military songs and marches, lived and died there
- Harry Kramer (1925–1997), sculptor, choreographer, dancer and professor of art
- Leonid Stukanov (1947–1998), Russian artist and teacher
- Beatrix Borchard (born 1950), musicologist and author
- Wilfried Telkämper (born 1953), MEP, Vice President of the European Parliament 1989–1992
- Reinhold Hilbers (born 1964), politician
- Jens Gieseke (born 1971), politician (CDU), Member of the European Parliament
- Christian Drosten (born 1972), virologist
- Christian Fühner (born 1987), politician (CDU)

=== Sport ===
- Joseph Rosemeyer (1872–1919), track cyclist, competed at the 1896 Summer Olympics
- Bernd Rosemeyer (1909–1938), racing car driver
- Peter van Roye (born 1950), rower, team bronze medallist at the 1976 Summer Olympics
- Ingo Schultz (born 1975), 400 metres runner
- Natalie Simanowski (born 1978)
- Michael Rensing (born 1984), footballer, played 355 games
