= Adriaan Dirk Jacob Meeuse =

Adriaan Dirk Jacob Meeuse (18 October 1914 – 15 September 2010) was a Dutch botanist and naturalist. Apart from plants he had an interest in insects and molluscs. He had an interest in the evolution of flowering plants. He was a professor of botany at the University of Amsterdam. His brother Bastiaan Jacob Dirk Meeuse (1916–1999) became a professor of botany at the University of Washington, Seattle.

== Life and work ==
Meeuse was born in Sukabumi, Java, where his father taught at the agricultural college. His mother taught at a Dutch-Chinese primary school and took the children on walks to look at indigenous medicinal plants. He was educated at Bogor (Jakarta) and in The Hague after the family returned in 1931. His younger brother Bastiaan also became a noted botanist. After growing up in the tropical region he had become interested in plants and animals and he studied biology at the University of Leiden. He majored in plant physiology, studying chloroplast structure under Lourens Baas Becking. He also studied animal behaviour under Niko Tinbergen and technical botany under Gerrit van Iterson. He received a doctorate in 1938. His teacher Herman Johannes Lam invited him to a collecting trip to Namibia, South Africa, Reunion, Mauritius and Madagascar. On return he was inducted into World War II military service for training but he was allowed to return to continue his studies under Van Iterson. During the war years the university was closed and he was involved in organizing underground activities and in education. During his African trip he met a South African of Scottish descent whom he married after the war. He became a biologist at Vezelinstituut Delft working on flax. He received a D.Phil in 1941 supervised by Baas Becking. In 1952 he joined the botanical research institute in Pretoria and worked on monographs of the plants of Sapotaceae, Convolvulaceae, Cucurbitaceae and Malvaceae and contributed to the Flowering Plants of Africa series. Meeuse examined the local knowledge on the association of aardvarks with the so-called aardvark cucumber Cucumis humifructus and was able to confirm that the plant was dispersed by aardvarks which obtain their moisture from the fruits. In 1960 he became a professor of botany at the University of Amsterdam. He guided several doctoral students and proposed two honorary doctorates. He was interested in plant ecology, studied pollination and suggested the term ambophily for pollination by both wind and animal agents, worked on the idea of gravitational pollination that was also supported by his brother Bastiaan. He took an interest in molluscs from an early age and wrote about them later. He developed a technique for extracting and mounting the radulae for taxonomic studies. He also collected insects. His herbarium collection represented some 6000 species. Several species of plants have been named after him including Hibiscus meeusei (now Sabdariffa nigricaulis) and Cucumis meeusei. The fossil plant genus Meeusella was described by V. A. Krassilov and noted for its stamen structures. An isopod found inside the palm house at Kew Gardens was described and named after him as Burmoniscus meeusei.

Meeuse had a wide range of interests, playing chess, bridge, with an interest in cooking, gardening and writing poetry.
