= Aningeria pierrei =

Conservation status
- Vulnerable (IUCN 3.1)

Scientific classification
- Kingdom: Plantae
- Clade: Tracheophytes
- Clade: Angiosperms
- Clade: Eudicots
- Clade: Asterids
- Order: Ericales
- Family: Sapotaceae
- Genus: Aningeria
- Species: A. pierrei

Binomial name
- Aningeria pierrei (A.Chev.) Aubrév. & Pellegr. (1934 publ. 1935)

Synonyms
- Aningeria robusta (A.Chev.) Aubrév. & Pellegr. (1934 publ. 1935); Hormogyne pierrei A.Chev. (1917); Malacantha robusta A.Chev. (1909); Pouteria aningeri Baehni (1942); Pouteria pierrei (A.Chev.) Baehni (1942); Rhamnoluma robusta (A.Chev.) Baehni (1965)

Species of flowering plant

Aningeria pierrei is a species of plant in the family Sapotaceae. It is a tree native to the tropical forests of west and west-central Africa, from Guinea Bissau to the western Central African Republic. It is commonly known as aningré blanc, and is a source of the timber known as anigre.

Aningeria pierrei is a large, deciduous tree, which grows up to 40 meters tall and with a trunk up to 150 cm in diameter. In Ghana it grows in semi-deciduous rain forest. In Côte d'Ivoire and Cameroon it is most abundant in the transition between semi-deciduous forest and humid evergreen forest.

Aningeria pierrei is heavily exploited for timber across parts of its range, particularly near densely populated areas. It is threatened by habitat loss from deforestation, slash-and-burn agriculture, and urbanization. It is also susceptible to fire.
