= Aningeria =

Scientific classification
- Kingdom: Plantae
- Clade: Tracheophytes
- Clade: Angiosperms
- Clade: Eudicots
- Clade: Asterids
- Order: Ericales
- Family: Sapotaceae
- Genus: Aningeria; Aubrév. & Pellegr. (1934 publ. 1935)

Species
- Aningeria adolfi-friederici (Engl.) Robyns & Gilbert; Aningeria altissima (A.Chev.) Aubrév. & Pellegr.; Aningeria pierrei (A.Chev.) Aubrév. & Pellegr.; Aningeria pseudoracemosa J.H.Hemsl.; Aningeria superba (Vermoesen) A.Chev.

Genus of trees

Aningeria is a genus of flowering plants in the family Sapotaceae. The genus includes five species of trees which range across tropical Africa, from Guinea Bissau eastwards to Ethiopia and Kenya, and from South Sudan south to Zimbabwe.

Species of Aningeria are sources of the wood anigre, which is used for wood veneer and light carpentry.

Some authorities consider the genus a synonym of Pouteria.

== Species ==
Five species are currently accepted:

- Aningeria adolfi-friederici (Engl.) Robyns & Gilbert (synonym Pouteria adolfi-friederici) – eastern Africa, from southwestern Ethiopia to Zimbabwe
- Aningeria altissima (A.Chev.) Aubrév. & Pellegr. (synonym Pouteria altissima) – tropical Africa, from Guinea to Ethiopia, and from South Sudan to Zambia.
- Aningeria pierrei (A.Chev.) Aubrév. & Pellegr. – western and central tropical Africa, from Guinea Bissau to the Central African Republic
- Aningeria pseudoracemosa J.H.Hemsl. – eastern Tanzania
- Aningeria superba (Vermoesen) A.Chev. – Republic of the Congo and Democratic Republic of the Congo
