= Indira Balachandran =

Indian botanist

- Education: University of Calicut (PhD)
- Scientific career
- Fields: Plant taxonomy
- Workplaces: Centre for Medicinal Plant Research (CMPR), Kerala
- Author abbrev. (botany): Balach.

Indira "Indu" Balachandran (born 1958) is a botanist and the director of Centre for Medicinal Plant Research (CMPR) in Malappuram, Kerala. Her research interest is in the area of plant taxonomy with a focus on the identification, standardization and ex-situ conservation of medicinal plants used in Ayurveda and other alternative medicine systems.

== Biography ==
Balachandran received the National Means-cum-Merit Scholarship (NMMS) to pursue her MSc in Botany. In 1982, Balachandran started working as a research officer at the Arya Vaidya Sala in Kottakkal, Kerala, where she was in-charge of the institute's herbal garden. In 1989, she was awarded the Fellowship of the International Council of Ayurveda (FICA). She completed her PhD in Botany with a specialization in plant taxonomy from University of Calicut, Kerala. Her doctoral thesis "Ayurvedic Drugs and their Plant Sources" was published by Oxford & IBH, New Delhi in 1994, and serves as reference for Ayurvedic students, doctors, and researchers within the country and abroad.

Between April to October 1990, Balachandran was a visiting professor at the University of Toyoma, Japan.

== Research ==
Between 1988 and 1997, Balachandran worked with a women's collective, Shodhini, on a research-action study on medicinal plants and women's health. She verified the medicinal properties of plant species, documented across 411 information sheets and herbariums, based on the symptoms and uses as reported by women from six states during the data collection stage. The findings were published by Kali Women's Press (now Zubaan), New Delhi in a book entitled Touch Me, Touch Me Not: Women, Herbs and Healing (1997).

In 2016, a team of scientists led by K.M. Prabhukumar and Balachandran discovered a new Habenaria species of orchid during a floristic exploration in the Shola forests on the Elivāl Hills of Muthikkulam forest area in Palakkad, Kerala; the plant was later christened Habenaria sahyadrica by Prabhukumar. The scientists are also credited for the discovery of a new Zingiber species in the Dhoni region of Palakkad, Kerala that was named Zingiber sabuanum after Indian plant taxonomist Mamiyil Sabu. Prabhukumar explained that the plants were unique to the Western Ghats, with the latter species expected to bloom between the months of June and July.

In 2017, Balachandran was part of a team of scientists who rediscovered Arisaema translucens, a rare flowering plant while conducting field surveys at the Nilgiri Biosphere Reserve, Tamil Nadu. There have been no confirmed sightings of the species since it was first collected by Edward Barnes in 1932 and then scientifically described in 1933.

In 2020, a research team led by Sulaiman C.T. under Balachandran’s guidance aimed to identify a potential substitute for the bark of Saraca asoca (Roxb.) Willd, also known the Ashoka tree. It is most common commonly used in alternative medicine formulations for the treatment of uterine disorders. Extracts from four medicinal plant species, Saraca asoca (AB), Polyalthia longifolia (PB), Shorea robusta (SB), and Trema orientalis (TB), were subjected to a series of phytochemical and pharmacological evaluations. According to the results, AB and SB demonstrated significant dose-dependent protection against "bilateral ovariectomy-induced changes in estrous cycle, uterus weights, and lipid profile." A Liquid chromatography–mass spectrometry (LC/MS) analysis found that both AB and SB contained presence active catechins. PB, the mainstream adulterant of Ashoka, comprised entirely different chemical and biological properties than the original. This study, supported by the Ministry of AYUSH (Government of India), concluded the possibility of using the bark of SB as the closest substitute for Ashoka. The same year, Prabhukumar and Balachandran's team of researchers discovered four new plant species in the Western Ghats, namely Gentiana sasidharani, Peucedanum pradeepianum, Hedyotis soolamudianus and Oberonia muthikulamensis.

A 2021 study conducted by CMPR's phytochemistry division supervised by Balachandran found that traditional purification of herbal drugs can impact their chemical and pharmacological profile as well as improve their safety and efficacy. An LC/MS analysis showed that the purification of Semecarpus anacardium (Bhallathaka) "imparted chemical changes to certain active compounds and enhanced its anti-cancer activity when compared to raw sample." In 2022, Balachandran was part of a study that carried out comparative phytochemical analysis and evaluation of antiurolithiatic activity to conclude the possibility of Ouret Lenata (Cherula) being a "validated alternative source" for Bergenia ligulata (Pashanabheda), an ayurvedic anti-urolithiatic drug used for the treating kidney stones.

During a 2024 expedition for a research project, sponsored by University Grants Commission, on the flowering plant species of Ernakulam district, Balachandran was a part of the team led by Sunil Chandrasseril Narayanan. Narayan was a research advisor at the Department of Botany, Sree Narayana Mangalam College, Maliankara and discovered a new plant species belonging to the Phyllanthaceae (gooseberry) family. The scientists discovered 55 plants of Emblica chakrabartyi in and around the Edamalayar and Sholayar forest areas of the Adichilthotti village. The species, named after Tapas Chakrabarty, former scientist at the Botanical Survey of India, to honour his contribution to the study on Phyllanthaceae, was the sixteenth new plant species discovered by Sunil and his team in Ernakulam district within a span of 12 years.

== Awards and recognition ==
Balachandran received gold medal from Journal of Research and Education in Indian Medicine for the best scientific paper presented at the first Asian Conference on Pharmaceutical Education, Research and Drug Industry held at Singapore in 1988.

Between 2013 and 2016, while conducting field explorations in the Elivāl Hills of Muthikkulam forest in Palakkad, Kerala, a team of scientists from Plant Systematics Division of the Centre for Medicinal Plant Research (CMPR) at Arya Vaidya Sala, Kottakkal, discovered an unknown plant species. Following several years of taxonomy and expert verification, the species was officially recognized as Hedyotis indirae, a coffee plant named after Balachandran for her extensive contribution to plant taxonomic studies and Ayurveda.

== Selected publications ==
=== Books ===
- Balachandran, Indira (2024). Ar̲iññirikkēṇṭa auṣadhasasyaṅṅaḷ (in Malayalam). Mātr̥bhūmi Buks. ISBN 978-93-5962-183-8
- Balachandran, Indira (2014). Koodariyathe (കൂടറിയാതെ). Calicut: Haritham books.
- Shree, A. B. Rema; K. K. Vijayan; Balachandran, Indira (2011). Pharmacognostic Standards of Ayurvedic Bark Drugs. Vaidyaratnam P.S. Varier's Arya Vaidya Sala. ISBN 978-93-80148-67-0
- Udayan, P. S., Balachandran, Indira (2011). Medicinal plants of Arya Vaidya Sala, Herb Garden. India: Centre for Medicinal Plants Research (CMPR) - Vaidyaratnam P.S. Varier's Arya Vaidya Sala. ISBN 978-93-80148-07-6
- Vannan Valappil; Balachandran, Indira (2004). Ayurvedic drugs and their plant sources (Repr ed.). New Delhi: Oxford & IBH Publ. ISBN 978-81-204-0828-9.
- Indira Balachandran (2000). Kalidasavykhari. Thiruvanthapuram: State Institute of Languages. ISBN 978-81-7638-124-6

=== Journal articles ===
- Sulaiman, CT; Balachandran, Indira (2012). "Total phenolics and total flavonoids in selected Indian medicinal plants". Indian Journal of Pharmaceutical Sciences. 74 (3): 258–260. doi:10.4103/0250-474X.106069. PMC 3574537. PMID 23439764.
- Srinivasan, GV; Unnikrishnan, KP; Rema Shree, AB; Balachandran, Indira (2008). "HPLC estimation of berberine in Tinospora cordifolia and Tinospora sinensis". Indian Journal of Pharmaceutical Sciences. 70: 96. doi:10.4103/0250-474X.40341. PMC 2852071. PMID 20390090.
- Kumar, Konickal Mambettaprabhu; Asish, Gopinathanramanikutty; Sabu, Mamiyil; Balachandran, Indira (2013). "Significance of gingers (Zingiberaceae) in Indian System of Medicine - Ayurveda: An overview". Ancient Science of Life. 32 (4): 253. doi:10.4103/0257-7941.131989. PMC 4078479.
- Raghu, A. V.; Geetha, S. P.; Martin, Gerald; Balachandran, Indira; Ravindran, P. N. (2006). "In vitro clonal propagation through mature nodes of Tinospora cordifolia (Willd.) Hook. F. & Thoms.: An important ayurvedic medicinal plant". In Vitro Cellular & Developmental Biology - Plant. 42 (6): 584–588. Bibcode:2006IVCDB..42..584R. doi:10.1079/IVP2006824.
- Subban, Ravi; Veerakumar, A.; Manimaran, R.; Hashim, K. M.; Balachandran, Indira (2008). "Two new flavonoids from Centella asiatica (Linn.)". Journal of Natural Medicines. 62 (3): 369–373. doi:10.1007/s11418-008-0229-0.
