= Friedrich Wilhelm Schultz =

German pharmacist and botanist

Friedrich Wilhelm Schultz (3 January 1804 – 30 December 1876) was a German pharmacist and botanist. A native of Zweibrücken, he published various texts on plants.

== Education ==
He initially learned the pharmacy profession at his father's store in Zweibrücken. In 1827 be began studies in Munich, later performing post-doctoral work in Tübingen.

== Career ==
In 1832 he became owner of a pharmacy in Bitsch, where he started 1836 his famous exsiccata series Flora Galliae et Germaniae exsiccata, herbier des plantes rares et critiques de la France et de l' Allemagne, recueillies par la Société de la Flore de France et d' Allemagne, publié par le docteur F. G. Schultz. In 1840 he founded the scientific society POLLICHIA, a group specializing in nature studies of the Rheinland-Pfalz region, with his brother, Carl Heinrich Schultz (1805-1867), et al.

In 1853 he relocated to Weissenburg. There he started the exsiccata Herbarium normale. Herbier des plantes nouvelles peu connues et rares d' Europe principalement de France et d' Allemagne publié par F. Schultz.

Schultz was a specialist regarding the botanical family Orobanchaceae. One of his better known publications was a book on Palatinate flora called Flora der Pfalz. With Paul Constant Billot (1796-1863), he was co-author of Archives de la flore de France et d’Allemagne.
