= Trachylepis buettneri =

Conservation status
- Least Concern (IUCN 3.1)

Scientific classification
- Kingdom: Animalia
- Phylum: Chordata
- Class: Reptilia
- Order: Squamata
- Family: Scincidae
- Genus: Trachylepis
- Species: T. buettneri

Binomial name
- Trachylepis buettneri (Matschie, 1893)

Synonyms
- Mabuya büttneri Matschie, 1893; Mabuya viancini Mocquard, 1895; Mabuya sudanensis Schmidt, 1919; Mabuya buettneri — Hoogmoed, 1974; Euprepis buettneri — Mausfeld et al., 2002; Trachylepis buettneri — Bauer, 2003

Species of lizard

Trachylepis buettneri is a species of skink, a lizard in the family Scincidae. The species is native to Central Africa and West Africa.

== Etymology ==
The specific name, buettneri, is in honor of German botanist Oskar Alexander Richard Büttner.

== Geographic range ==
T. buettneri is found in Cameroon, Central African Republic, Democratic Republic of the Congo, Ghana, Ivory Coast, and Togo.

== Habitat ==
The preferred natural habitat of T. buettneri is savanna.

== Description ==
T. buettneri has a very long tail. The tail length may be four times the snout-to-vent length (SVL).

== Reproduction ==
T. buettneri is oviparous.
