= Aningeria altissima =

Conservation status
- Conservation Dependent (IUCN 2.3)

Scientific classification
- Kingdom: Plantae
- Clade: Tracheophytes
- Clade: Angiosperms
- Clade: Eudicots
- Clade: Asterids
- Order: Ericales
- Family: Sapotaceae
- Genus: Aningeria
- Species: A. altissima

Binomial name
- Aningeria altissima (A.Chev.) Aubrév. & Pellegr.

Synonyms
- Hormogyne altissima A.Chev.; Hormogyne gabonensis A.Chev.; Pouteria altissima (A.Chev.) Baehni; Pouteria giordani Chiov.; Rhamnoluma altissima (A.Chev.) Baehni; Sideroxylon altissimum (A.Chev.) Hutch. & Dalziel; Sideroxylon gabonense (A.Chev.) Lecomte ex Pellegr.

Species of flowering plant

Aningeria altissima is a species of plant in the family Sapotaceae, and a source of anigre hardwood. It is found in Burundi, Cameroon, Central African Republic, the Republic of the Congo, the Democratic Republic of the Congo, Ivory Coast, Ethiopia, Gabon, Ghana, Guinea, Kenya, Nigeria, Rwanda, Sierra Leone, Sudan, Tanzania, and Uganda. It is threatened by habitat loss.
