= Aningeria superba =

Scientific classification
- Kingdom: Plantae
- Clade: Tracheophytes
- Clade: Angiosperms
- Clade: Eudicots
- Clade: Asterids
- Order: Ericales
- Family: Sapotaceae
- Genus: Aningeria
- Species: A. superba

Binomial name
- Aningeria superba (Vermoesen) A.Chev. (1943)

Synonyms
- Malacantha superba Vermoesen (1923); Pouteria superba (Vermoesen) L.Gaut. (1997); Richardella superba (Vermoesen) Baehni (1965)

Species of flowering plant

Aningeria superba is a species of plant in the family Sapotaceae. It is a tree native to the Congolian forests of west-central Africa, including the Republic of the Congo, Democratic Republic of the Congo, and Cabinda.

Aningeria superba is a source of the hardwood anigre, which is used commercially for wood veneer and light carpentry.
