= Christian Fühner =

German politician (born 1987)

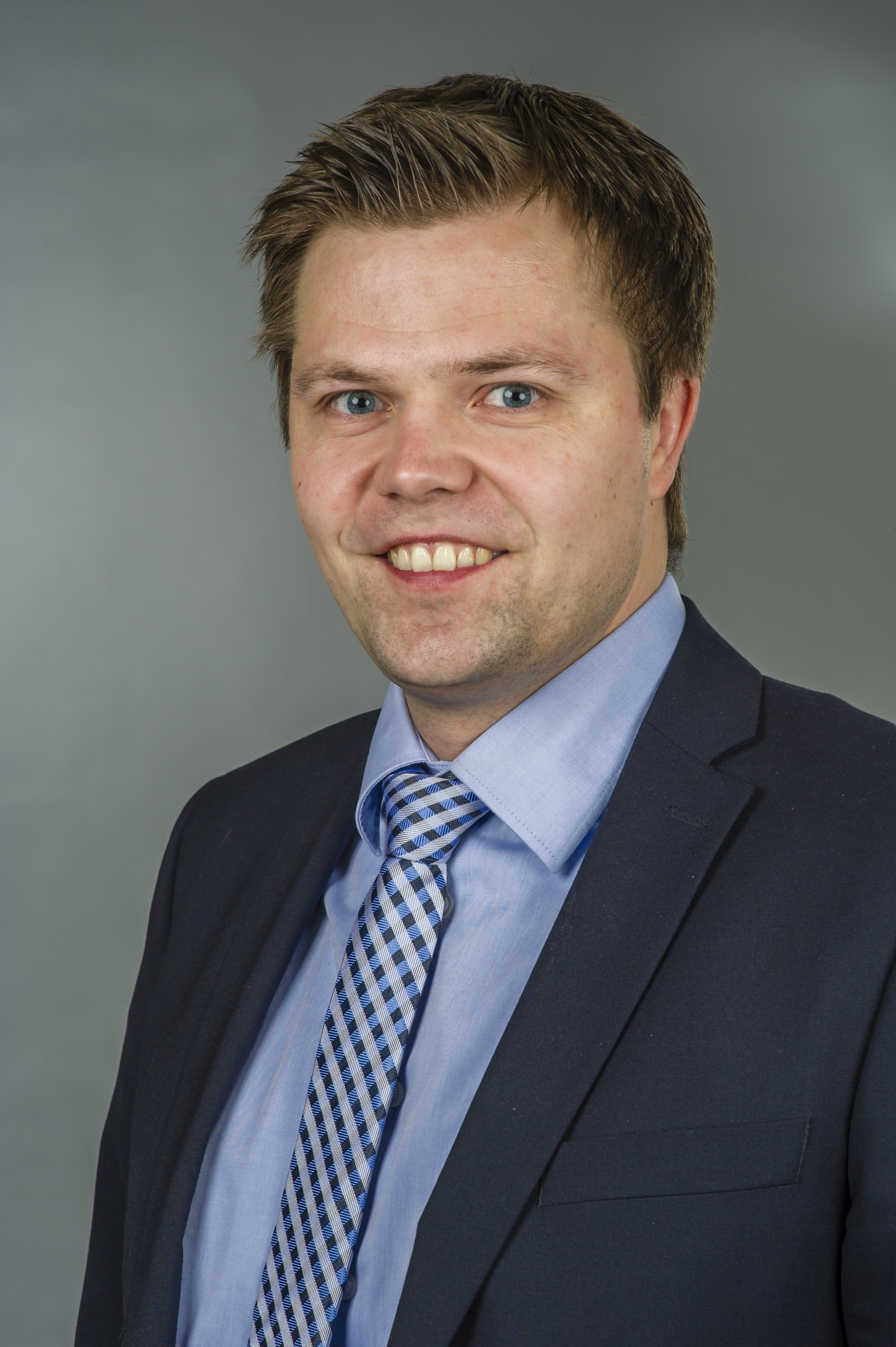
- Fühner in 2018

Member of the Landtag of Lower Saxony
- Incumbent
- Assumed office 14 November 2017
- Preceded by: Heinz Rolfes
- Constituency: Lingen

Personal details
- Born: 29 May 1987 (age 39)
- Party: Christian Democratic Union (since 2009)

Christian Fühner (born 29 May 1987 in Lingen) is a German politician serving as a member of the Landtag of Lower Saxony since 2017. He has served as chairman of the Young Union in Lower Saxony since 2022.
