= Aningeria pseudoracemosa =

Conservation status
- Vulnerable (IUCN 2.3)

Scientific classification
- Kingdom: Plantae
- Clade: Tracheophytes
- Clade: Angiosperms
- Clade: Eudicots
- Clade: Asterids
- Order: Ericales
- Family: Sapotaceae
- Genus: Aningeria
- Species: A. pseudoracemosa

Binomial name
- Aningeria pseudoracemosa J.H.Hemsl. (1961)

Synonyms
- Pouteria pseudoracemosa (J.H.Hemsl.) L.Gaut. (1997)

Species of flowering plant

Aningeria pseudoracemosa is a species of plant in the family Sapotaceae. It is endemic to Tanzania. It is known from three locations – in Kimboza Forest Reserve east of the Uluguru Mountains, and at low elevations in the East Usambara Mountains and north Udzungwa Mountains. It grows in moist lowland and foothill forests. It is endemic to the Northern Zanzibar–Inhambane coastal forest mosaic ecoregion.
