= Anigre =

Type of wood with a common name of Muna

Anigre is an African hardwood commonly used for plywood, interior furniture, cabinetry, and high-end millwork applications. It is frequently sliced and sold as veneer, although it is available in board form as well. In board form it is used for boat building, general carpentry, and other light construction uses.

== Characteristics ==
It is considered a tropical hardwood with a clear, cylindrical bole to 80 feet (24 m). It can grow to heights of 180 feet (55 m) with typical trunk diameters ranging from 36 to 48 inches (910 to 1,220 mm). Anigre has a medium texture with closed pores similar to maple. Growth rings aren't always well-defined, and the wood can be rather plain-looking; though certain figure is occasionally present, such as curly or mottled grain. The sapwood and the heartwood are not usually distinguishable. The heartwood is a light yellowish-brown, sometimes with a pinkish hue. Color tends to darken with age. The quarter figured veneer has become a popular choice for furniture, cabinetry, and decorative architectural applications. It is said to have a faint odor similar to Cedar. In its untreated form Anigre is susceptible to termite and fungi attacks and generally has low durability. Anigre is usually considered easy to work with hand and power tools, although depending on the origin of the wood it can have a high silica content which can dull wood working tools quickly.

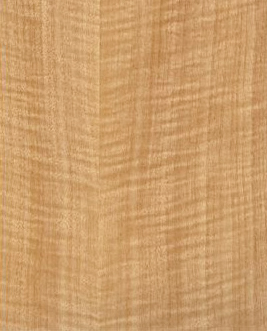
Quarter Figured Anigre

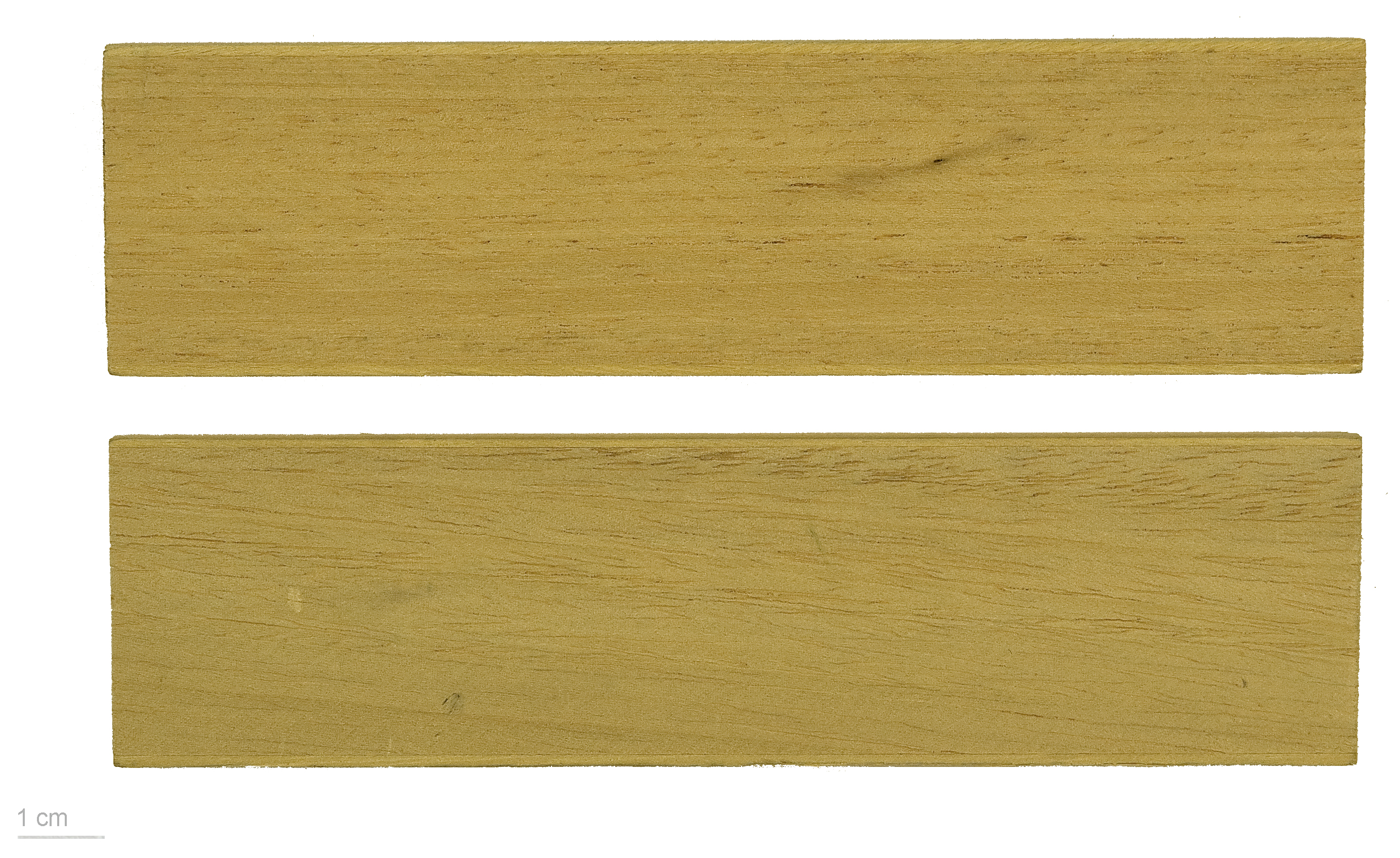
Aningeria sp - MHNT

== Origins ==
Anigre is often found in tropical East and West Africa, primarily in Cameroon but also in Angola, Congo, Ethiopia, Ghana, Guinea Bissau, Ivory Coast, Kenya, Nigeria, Sierra Leone, Uganda and Zaire. Exportation from Cameroon is prohibited by local laws.

== Common names ==
Anigre, Aningre, Anegre, Aniegre, Aniegré, Aningré, Aningeria, Aninguerie, Mugangu, Muna, Osan, Anegre Blanc, Longhi, Mukaly, Tanganyika Nuss. Common pronunciations vary from Ah-Nee-Grey, Ah-Nee-Gra, Anna-Gra, Anna-Grey, Uh-Nee-Grey.

== Scientific names ==
Anigre hardwood comes from several species in the family Sapotaceae, including Aningeria altissima, Aningeria pierrei (synonym Aningeria robusta), Aningeria superba, and Gambeya gigantea (synonym Gambeyobotrys gigantea).
