= Rosalina Berazaín Iturralde =

Cuban botanist

Rosalina Berazaín Iturralde (born 21 February 1947, Havana) is a Cuban botanist, plant collector, plant taxonomist, and professor at the University of Havana. She is one of the founders of the National Botanic Garden of Cuba, and a member of the Cuban Academy of Sciences. The standard author abbreviation Berazaín is used to indicate this person as the author when citing a botanical name. The species Coccoloba berazainae and Coccoloba berazainiae were named in her honor.
