= Saroj Kanta Barik =

Indian botanist and ecologist

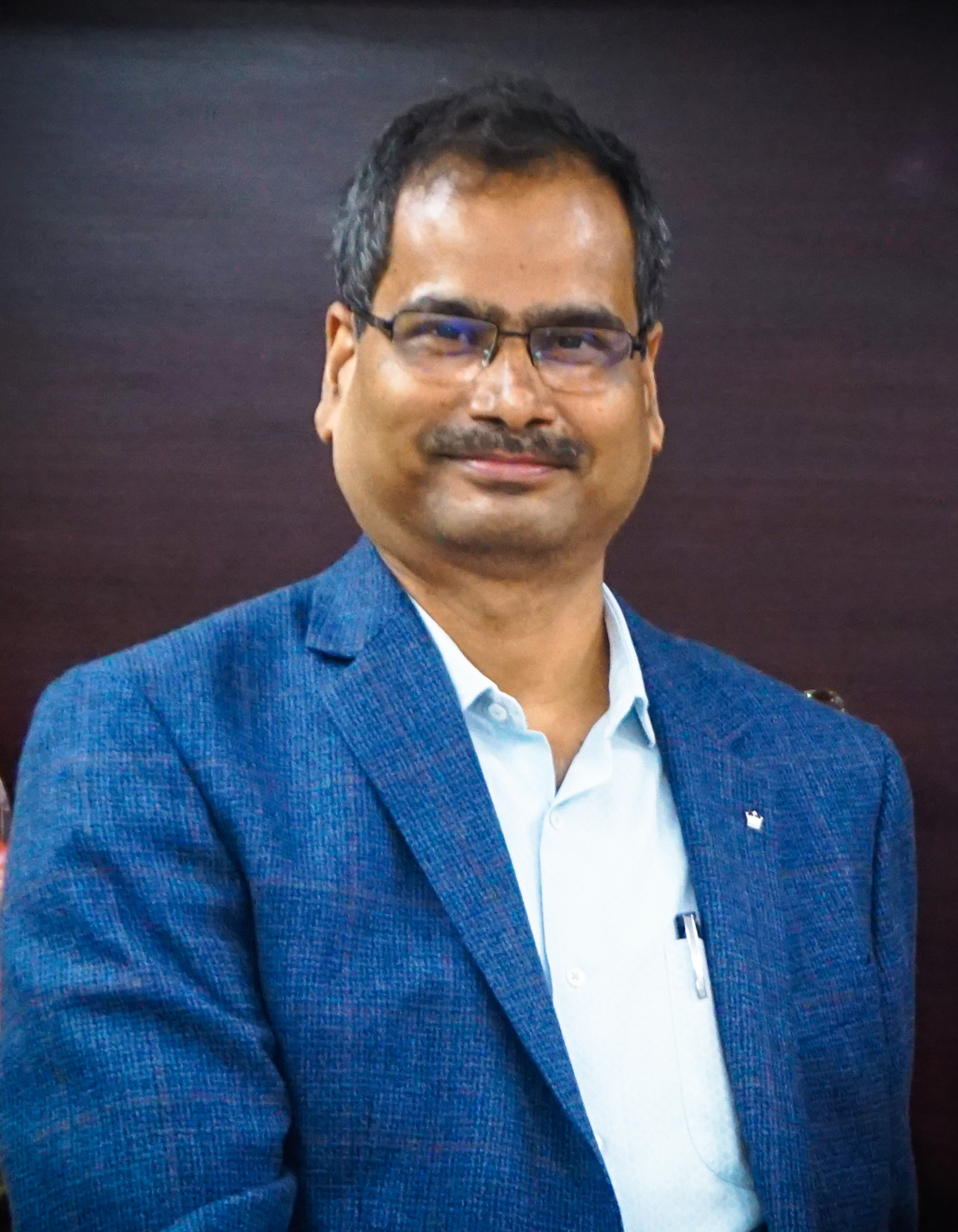
- Prof. Saroj Kanta Barik
- Born: 12 April 1965 (age 61); Remuna, Odisha, India
- Education: Utkal University; Berhampur University; North-Eastern Hill University
- Occupations: Botanist, Ecologist
- Employer: North-Eastern Hill University
- Known for: Plant ecology, Biodiversity conservation, Bioprospection
- Title: Vice-Chancellor; Professor of Botany
- Awards: Fellow, Indian National Science Academy (FNA) (2024); Fellow, Indian Academy of Sciences (FASc) (2025); Fellow, National Academy of Sciences, India (FNASc) (2018); Fellow, National Academy of Agricultural Sciences (FNAAS) (2020)

Saroj Kanta Barik, also known as S. K. Barik, is an Indian botanist, ecologist, and scientific and academic administrator specializing in plant ecology, biodiversity conservation, and bioprospection. He is a Professor of Botany and the current Vice-Chancellor of North-Eastern Hill University (NEHU), Shillong. He previously served as the Director of the CSIR-National Botanical Research Institute (CSIR-NBRI) from 2016 to 2022, and concurrently held the directorship of the CSIR-Indian Institute of Toxicology Research (CSIR-IITR), Lucknow from 2020 to 2022.

== Early life and education ==
Barik was born on 12 April 1965 in Gourpur, Remuna, in the Balasore district of Odisha. He completed his Bachelor of Science from Utkal University (1983) and his Master of Science in Life Sciences-Botany from Berhampur University (1985). He earned his Ph.D. from North-Eastern Hill University (NEHU) in 1993, where his doctoral research focused on the ecology of tree regeneration in the subtropical wet hill forests of Meghalaya.

== Career ==
Barik began his career as a scientist at the State Forest Research Institute, Government of Arunachal Pradesh (1995–1997). He joined NEHU as a lecturer in 1997, becoming a Professor in 2006. He served as the Head of the Department of Botany at NEHU from 2014 to 2016.

=== Administrative roles ===
In November 2016, Barik was appointed Director of the CSIR-National Botanical Research Institute. During his tenure, he was designated as an "Outstanding Professor" (Scientist H), a senior professor rank within the Academy of Scientific and Innovative Research (AcSIR). Between 2020 and 2022, he concurrently held directorship of the CSIR-Indian Institute of Toxicology Research, Lucknow. He was also the Theme Director of CSIR Argiculture-Nutrition-Biotechnology theme from 2019 to 2022.

Following his return to NEHU, Barik assumed charge as the Dean of School of Life Sciences at the university from 2025. Currently, he is serving as the Vice-Chancellor of the university following approval by the President of India.

== Research ==
Barik has authored research papers in peer-reviewed journals, book chapters, and books. His works have been published in journals such as Proceedings of the National Academy of Sciences, Current Forestry Reports, and Journal of Applied Ecology.

=== Taxonomic contributions ===
Barik and his research team have described several new plant species from the Himalayas and North-East India. These discoveries include:

- Trisetopsis himalayensis (2021), a new grass species (Poaceae, Aveninae) discovered from the Maitoli Glacier in the Western Himalaya.
- Anemone pindariensis (2021), a new species from the Pindari valley of the Western Himalaya.
- A new species of Aconitum (2021) described from Sikkim in the Eastern Himalaya.
- Aconitum haridasanii (2020), a new species from Arunachal Pradesh.
- Another new species of Aconitum (2019) described from the Eastern Himalaya.
- A new fern species of Christella (2019) belonging to the family Thelypteridaceae.
- A new species of Pedicularis (2018) in the series Curvipes (Orobanchaceae).

Additionally, Barik's team resolved the nomenclature and typification of Swertia angustifolia and its infraspecific taxa in 2020.

== Selected bibliography ==
Barik has authored numerous research papers in peer-reviewed journals. Key publications include:

- Gupta, A.; Naseem, M.; Gupta, E.; Srivastava, P.K.; Barik, S.K. (2025). "Metagenomic profiling of cyanide-degrading microbial communities in steel industry wastewater with an implication for bioremediation". Engineering Environment. 19 (10): 137.
- Adhikari, D.; Singh, P.P.; Tiwary, R.; Barik, S.K. (2024). "Forest carbon stock-based bioeconomy: mixed models improve accuracy of tree biomass estimates". Biomass and Bioenergy. 183: 107142.
- Kharlyngdoh, Evanylla; Barik, Saroj Kanta (2024). "Evaluating bioeconomic potential of Phyllostachys mannii Gamble, a monopodial bamboo and Chimonocalamus griffithianus (Munro) Hsueh & T.P. Yi, a sympodial bamboo from north-eastern India". Biomass and Bioenergy. 182: 107076.
- Lien, A.; Banki, O.; Barik, S.K.; et al. (2023). "Widespread Support for a Global Species List with a Formal Governance System". Proceedings of the National Academy of Sciences. 120 (45): e2306899120.
- Himes, A.; Bauhus, J.; Adhikari, S.; Barik, S.K.; et al. (2023). "Forestry in the face of global change: Results of a global survey of professionals". Current Forestry Reports. 9 (6): 473–489.
- Mishra, Niranjan; Behera, S.K.; Barik, S.K. (2023). "In vitro development of gametophytes and sporophytes of critically endangered fern Christella kendujharensis S.K. Behera & S.K. Barik (Thelypteridaceae)". Feddes Repertorium. doi:10.1002/fedr.202200015.
- Shelke, Rahul G.; Banerjee, Rudra Prasad; Joshi, Babita; Singh, Prem Prakash; Barik, Saroj Kanta; et al. (2022). "Chloroplast genome of Lithocarpus dealbatus (Hook.f. & Thomson ex Miq.) Rehder establishes monophyletic origin of the species and reveals mutational hotspots with taxon delimitation potential". Life. 12: 828.
- Rayees, Ahmad Lone; Kunwar, Sarvendra; Singh, Vinayak; Barik, Saroj Kanta; et al. (2022). "Adaptation of winged bean (Psophocarpus tetragonolobus (L.) DC.) to drought stress is mediated by root-tuber heat-shock proteins and specific metabolites". Current Plant Biology. 32: 100266.
- Sharma, Vivek K.; Gupta, Sateesh C.; Singh, Brahma N.; Rao, Chandana V.; Barik, Saroj K. (2022). "Cinnamomum verum-derived bioactives-functionalized gold nanoparticles for prevention of obesity through gut microbiota reshaping". Materials Today Bio. 13: 100204.
- Das, Pulakesh; Mudi, Sujoy; Behera, Mukunda D.; Barik, Saroj K.; et al. (2021). "Automated Mapping for Long-Term Analysis of Shifting Cultivation in Northeast India". Remote Sensing. 13: 1066. doi:10.3390/rs13061066.
- Adhikari, Dibyendu; Tiwary, Raghuvar; Singh, Prem Prakash; Barik, Saroj Kanta; et al. (2019). "Ecological niche modeling as a cumulative environmental impact assessment tool for biodiversity assessment and conservation planning: A case study of critically endangered plant Lagerstroemia minuticarpa in the Indian Eastern Himalaya". Journal of Environmental Management. 243: 299–307.
- Adhikari, D.; Tiwary, R.; Barik, S.K. (2015). "Modelling hotspots for invasive alien plants in India". PLoS ONE. 10 (7) e0134665. doi:10.1371/journal.pone.0134665. PMC 4521859.
- Adhikari, D.; Barik, S.K.; Upadhaya, K. (2012). "Habitat distribution modelling for reintroduction of Ilex khasiana Purk., a critically endangered tree species of north-eastern India". Ecological Engineering. 40: 37–43.
- Baishya, R.; Barik, S.K. (2011). "Estimation of tree biomass, carbon pool and net primary production of an old-growth Pinus kesiya Royle ex.Gordon forest in north-eastern India". Annals of Forest Science. 68: 727–736.
- Barik, S.K.; Tripathi, R.S.; Pandey, H.N.; Rao, P. (1996). "Tree regeneration in a subtropical humid forest: effect of cultural disturbance on seed production, dispersal and germination". Journal of Applied Ecology. 33: 1551–1560.

The standard author abbreviation Barik is used to indicate this person as the author when citing a botanical name.

== Professional associations ==
Barik has held advisory roles in national scientific bodies and government committees. He served as the President of the Indian Botanical Society in 2025, during which he organized the society's XLVIII All India Botanical Conference and International Symposium at NEHU.

Other significant roles include:

- Board Member, Science and Engineering Research Board (SERB), Department of Science and Technology, Government of India
- Vice-President, National Academy of Sciences, India (NASI)
- President, International Society for Environmental Botanists (ISEB)
- Member, Governing Body, G. B. Pant National Institute of Himalayan Environment
- Member, Governing Body, National Institute of Plant Genome Research (NIPGR)

== Awards and recognition ==
=== Fellowships ===
Barik is a Fellow of the major Indian science academies:

- Fellow, Indian National Science Academy (FNA), 2024
- Fellow, Indian Academy of Sciences (FASc), 2025
- Fellow, The Linnean Society of London (FLS), 2020
- Fellow, National Academy of Agricultural Sciences (FNAAS), 2020
- Fellow, National Academy of Sciences, India (FNASc), 2018

=== Awards ===
- Samanta Chandra Sekhar Award (2020), conferred by the Government of Odisha for scientific excellence.
- Prof. R.N. Tandon Memorial Award (2020) from the National Academy of Sciences, India
- Professor Birbal Sahni Medal (2019) from the Indian Botanical Society
- Dr. Brandis Award (2009) from The Indian Forester
- Dr. Mopuri Brahmam Memorial Award (2016) for biodiversity conservation
- NASI Biodiversity Lecture Award (2019)
