= Bismarckburg, Togo =

Bismarckburg
- Colonial station
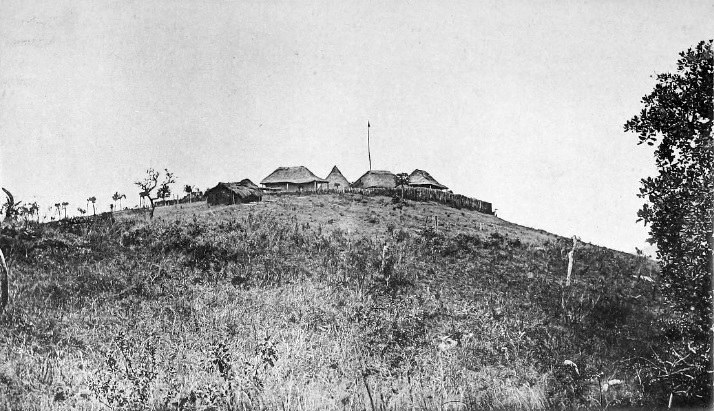
- Bismarckburg in 1893

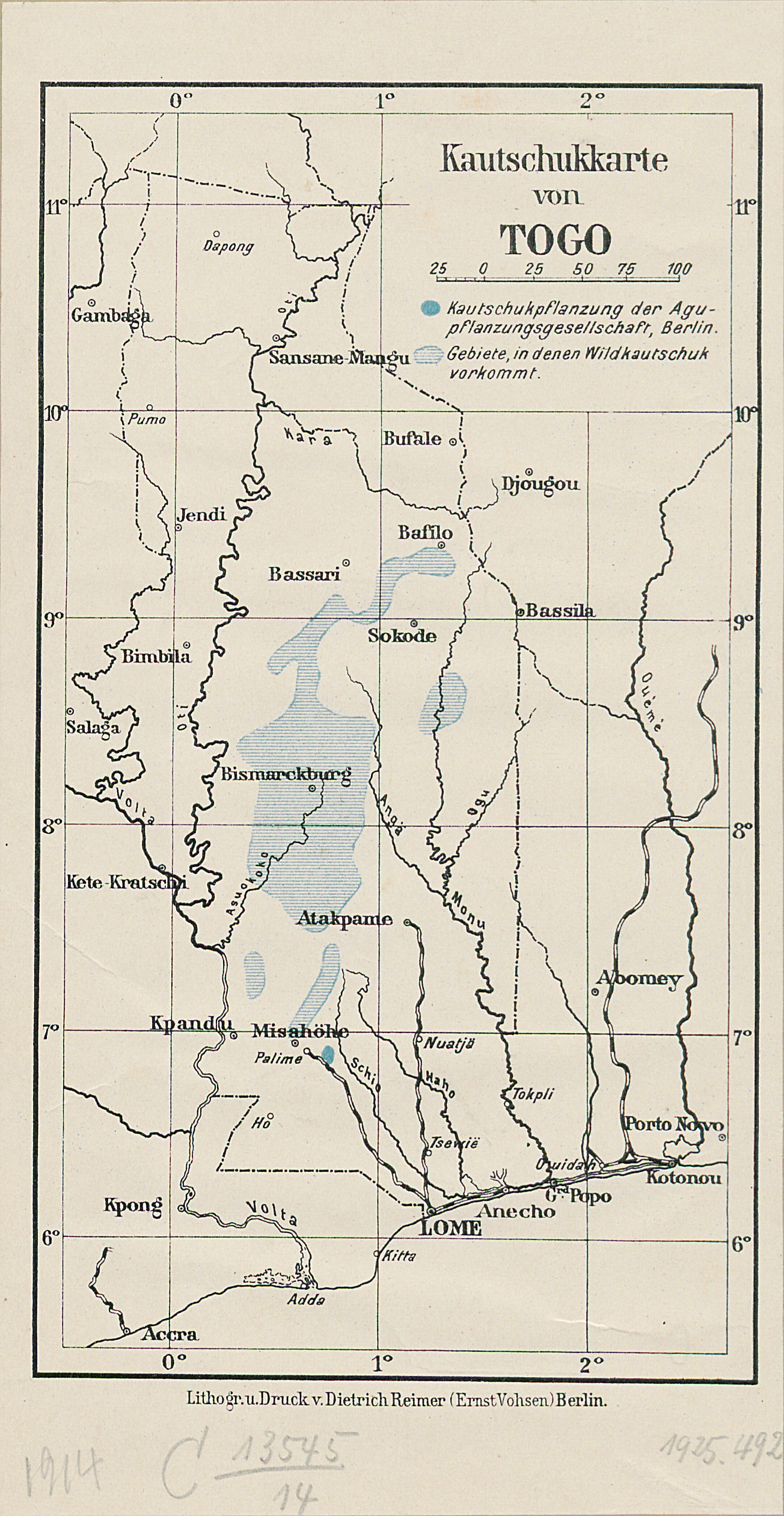
- Togo in 1914.

- Togo, current borders
- Coordinates: 8.1772°N 0.6870°E
- Country: Togo
- Elevation: 750 m (2,460 ft)

Bismarckburg was a colonial station in the German colony of Togo. It was named after the founder of the German empire, Otto von Bismarck.

== History ==
The station was founded in June 1888 by the explorer Ludwig Wolf. It was one of the first permanently inhabited European stations in the interior of West Africa and was located on the 750 meter high Adadoberg. In the years 1889–90 the station was headed by Erich Kling and was the starting point for several expeditions to explore the hinterland and to expand German influence in the area. Kling and his successor Richard Büttner had a palisade fence built for fortification. At that time, the station consisted of nine adobe buildings arranged in a rectangle. The built-up area was 47 by 56 metres (154 by 184 ft). The station was manned by two Germans - the station manager and a mechanic. Outside the palisades were agricultural areas on which cultivation trials with European crops and tropical crops were carried out. Around 1900 a cola and coffee plantation was still in operation.

The Imperial Commissariat under Jesko von Puttkamer was skeptical of the station due to its remoteness and economic inefficiency. Instead of directing trade to the coast of German Togo, it strengthened the existing connections to the British Gold Coast. As early as 30 June 1894, the status as a European station was revoked. Between 1888 and 1897, a weather station of the Deutsche Seewarte was active in Bismarckburg. The colonial station was still under the control of a German district manager in Kete Krachi as a secondary station until 1914. It remained economically important as African traders came to the area to buy rubber.

== Sources ==
- "Bericht des Dr. Büttner über die Station Bismarckburg (Togo-Gebiet)", Deutsches Kolonialblatt (in German), 2, 1891
- Deutscher Wetterdienst: Stationsliste der Überseestationen. Stand 11 (pdf) (in German), January 2019
- Fitzner, Rudolf (1901), Deutsches Kolonial-Handbuch (in German), vol. 1, 2, Reprint, Melchior Verlag, Wolfenbüttel, Berlin: Aufl., Hermann Paetel
- "Kling, Erich", Deutsches Kolonial-Lexikon, 1920, archived from the original on 2014-10-06
- "Reise des Hauptmanns Kling von Lome über Salaga nach Bismarckburg im Sommer 1891", Mitteilungen von Forschungsreisenden und Gelehrten aus den deutschen Schutzgebieten (in German), 5, 1892
- Schmit, Rochus (1898), Deutschlands Kolonien (in German), vol. 2, Reprint by Weltbild Verlag. Augsburg 1998, Berlin: Verlag des Vereins der Bücherfreunde Schall & Grund
- Weidmann, Conrad (1894), Deutsche Männer in Afrika (in German), Lübeck: Bernhard Nöhring
- "Wolf, Ludwig", Deutsches Kolonial-Lexikon (in German), 1920, archived from the original on 2015-12-21
