= Henry Curtis Beardslee Sr. =

American physician and botanist (1807–1884)

Henry Curtis Beardslee Sr. (July 2, 1807 – December 21, 1884) was an American medical doctor, botanist, and state legislator. He was the father of botanist Henry Curtis Beardslee.

Beardslee, son of Dr. Gideon and Sarah Ann (Curtiss) Beardslee, was born in that part of Huntington which is since 1823 the town of Monroe, Conn., July 2, 1807. His father died in 1826. He graduated from Yale College in 1826 and in May, 1827, he began the study of medicine in New Haven, graduating at the Medical Institution in 1829. He shortly after opened an office in Montville, Conn., and soon had an extensive but laborious country practice. He was elected to the Connecticut State Legislature in 1844.

In May, 1845, he moved to Painesville, Ohio, where he devoted himself for the rest of his life to his profession, becoming especially skillful and successful in the more difficult surgical operations. The most laborious portion of Dr. Beardslee's professional life was from 1863 to 1865, when as examining surgeon for his Congressional district he examined upwards of 12,000 candidates for military service in the American Civil War. His health failed in 1882, and the last three years were years of great and increasing weakness. Outside of his profession he was especially interested in botany, and has left an unpublished catalogue of the plants of Ohio, compiled for the use of the Geological survey. He died in Painesville, December 21, 1884, in his 78th year.

He married in the spring of 1833 Harriet Hawley, of Monroe. They became the parebts of three daughters and two sons. She died July 8, 1860. In November, 1861, he married Clementine M. Carrier, of Enfield, Connecticut. She survived him with her three sons, and a daughter and a son by his first marriage.

This article incorporates public domain material from the 1885 Yale Obituary Record.
