= Ludwig Wolf =

German doctor and anthropologist

Heinrich Ludwig Wolf
- Born: 29 January 1850; Hagen, Osnabrück, Germany
- Died: 26 June 1889 (aged 39) near N'Dali, Dahomey (Benin)
- Occupations: Doctor and anthropologist

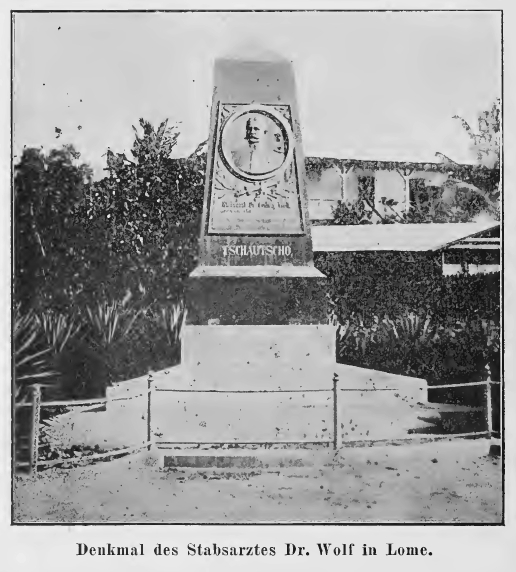
Monument to Wolf in Lome (Togo)

Heinrich Ludwig Wolf (29 January 1850 – 26 June 1889) was a German doctor and anthropologist.

== Early years ==
Heinrich Ludwig Wolf was born on 29 January 1850 in Hagen, Osnabrück, Germany. He studied medicine at the University of Greifswald and the University of Würzburg. He completed his studies in 1874 with a state examination and doctorate.

He initially worked as ship's doctor at Norddeutscher Lloyd (North German Lloyd) until 1878. Between 1876 and 1878 he made several trips to North and South America as a ship's doctor. In 1879 he joined the Royal Saxon Army as a military doctor and was promoted to medical officer. In Leipzig and North America he completed training in ophthalmology.

== Congo expedition ==
As a doctor and anthropologist, he joined the Congo expedition of Hermann Wissmann for the International African Association. He left Europe of 16 November 1883. Wolf made independent research trips during the expedition, including to the land of the Bakuba people. After Wissmann fell ill in September 1885 Wolf assumed leadership of the expedition, and explored the Sankuru River and the Lomami River. He rejoined Wissmann on 12 April 1886 at the confluence of the Lulua River. After Wolf returned to Germany he and his travel companions François and Müller wrote and account of the expedition.

== Togoland (1887–1889) ==
Wolf was assigned to the German Foreign Office in 1887, and was charged with researching the hinterland of the German colony of Togoland. On December 1, 1887, Wolf was appointed Reich Commissioner for Togo. There in 1898 he founded the Bismarckburg station, which he tried to develop through plantings. However, the station was off the traditional trade routes, so that it was relocated after a few years. When Wolf wanted to move Bismarckburg to the central Niger River, he died while on the way from a fever caused by Malaria, or according to other sources from poisoning.

He died on 26 June 1889 near N'Dali, Dahomey (Benin). In accordance with his wishes he was wrapped in a German flag and buried in a coffin made of palm ribs.

== Publications ==
- Ludwig Wolf; Francois; Müller (1888), Im Innern Afrikas (In the interior of Africa), Leipzig

== Sources ==
- Gruner, Hans (1997), Peter Sebald (ed.), Vormarsch zum Niger. Die Memoiren des Leiters der Togo-Hinterlandexpedition 1894/95. (in German), Berlin: Edition Ost, ISBN 3-929161-07-9
- Mettenleiter, Andreas (2003), Selbstzeugnisse, Erinnerungen, Tagebücher und Briefe deutschsprachiger Ärzte. Nachträge und Ergänzungen III (I–Z), Würzburger medizinhistorische Mitteilungen (in German), vol. 22, pp. 269–305
- Schmidt, Rochus (1898), Deutschlands Kolonien (in German), vol. 2, Reprint durch Weltbild Verlag. Augsburg 1998, Berlin: Verlag des Vereins der Bücherfreunde Schall & Grund
- Weidmann, Conrad (1894), Deutsche Männer in Afrika. Lexicon der hervorragendsten deutschen Afrika-Forscher, Missionare etc., Lübeck: Verlagsbuchhandlung Bernhard Nöhring
