= Habenaria sahyadrica =

Conservation status
- Endangered (IUCN 3.1)
- CITES Appendix II

Scientific classification
- Kingdom: Plantae
- Clade: Tracheophytes
- Clade: Angiosperms
- Clade: Monocots
- Order: Asparagales
- Family: Orchidaceae
- Subfamily: Orchidoideae
- Genus: Habenaria
- Species: H. sahyadrica

Binomial name
- Habenaria sahyadrica K.M.P.Kumar, Nirmesh, V.B.Sreek. & Kumar

Species of orchid

Habenaria sahyadrica is a species of orchid. It is native to the Western Ghats in India.
