= Louis Jules Ernest Malinvaud =

French physician and botanist

Louis Jules Ernest Malinvaud (26 September 1836, in Paris – 22 September 1913) was a French physician and botanist.

Beginning in 1860, he studied medicine in Limoges and later Paris (from 1863). After serving as a doctor during the Franco-Prussian War, he left the medical practice in order to concentrate his energies towards botany. As a botanist he collaborated with Pierre Marie Édouard Lamy de la Chapelle (1804–1886). From 1877 until 1881 he edited the exsiccata Menthae exsiccatae praesertim Galliae.

In 1861 he became a member of the Société botanique de France. The plant genus Malinvaudia (subfamily Asclepiadaceae) was named after him by Eugène Pierre Nicolas Fournier (1834–1884).
