= Matthieu Bonafous =

French botanist (1793–1852)

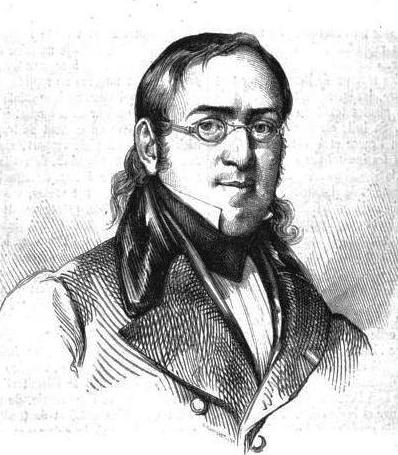
- Matthieu Bonafous in 1857
- Born: March 7, 1793; Lyon, Rhône-Alpes, France
- Died: March 23, 1852 (aged 59)
- Occupation: Botanist

Matthieu Bonafous (7 March 1793 – 22 March 1852) was a French botanist born in Lyon.

== Early life ==
Matthieu Bonafous was born on March 7, 1793, in Lyon, France.

== Career ==
Bonafous wrote Histoire Naturelle, Agricole et Économique du Mäis, a monograph about maize, in 1836. In it, he showed that corn was able to adapt to hostile weather conditions. For example, it could grow in sand (as in New Jersey), in humid climate (like Colombia) or in cold weather (like the Apennine Mountains).

He also wrote about mulberry trees and their use for raising silkworms in De la culture des Mûriers (1822) and Traité de l'éducation des Vers à Soie et de la culture du Mûrier (1840).

The plant Bonafousia was named after him.

== Death ==
He died on March 23, 1852.

== Other works ==
- Bonafous, M. (1833). Traité du maïs, ou, Histoire naturelle et agricole de cette céréale. Mémoires de la Société royale et centrale d'Agriculture.
- Bonafous, M. (1822). De la culture des mûriers. J.M. Barret.
