= Konrad Beckhaus =

German Protestant clergyman and botanist

Konrad Friedrich Ludwig Beckhaus (18 August 1821, Lingen – 13 August 1890, Höxter) was a German Protestant clergyman and botanist.

He studied theology in Halle, Tübingen and Berlin, subsequently becoming a Hilfsprediger (curate) in the city of Höxter in 1847. In 1851 he became a pastor at Sankt Kiliani church in Höxter and six years later was appointed superintendent of the Paderborn church district.

He was the author of a popular book on the flora of Westphalia, titled Flora von Westfalen. die in der Provinz Westfalen wild wachsenden Gefäss-Pflanzen, published posthumously in 1893. Taxa with the specific epithet of beckhausii commemorate his name, as does the lichen genus Beckhausia.
