= Miriam L. Bomhard =

American botanist (1898–1952)

Miriam Lucile Bomhard
- Born: July 24, 1898; Bellevue, Kentucky, U.S.
- Died: December 16, 1952 (aged 54); Glenshaw, Pennsylvania, U.S.
- Education: University of Pittsburgh
- Occupation: Botanist

Miriam Lucile Bomhard (July 24, 1898 – December 16, 1952) was a conservationist and botanist from the United States of America. She was the first woman to receive a PhD from the University of Pittsburgh.

== Early life ==
Bomhard was born in Bellevue, Kentucky in 1898, the daughter of the Reverend W.A. Bomhard and Emma (Koch) Bomhard. The family moved to Pittsburgh in 1907. In 1917, she graduated as valedictorian of her high school.

== Studies and career ==
Bomhard attended the University of Pittsburgh on an honour scholarship. She graduated in 1921. She began work at the University of Pittsburgh as a graduate assistant and then as an instructor in the botany department. She conducted research work alongside this, including work at the Carnegie Museum Herbarium. She received a Ph.D. in 1926, the first women to receive that degree from the University of Pittsburgh. Her doctoral thesis was on the subject of illustrations and keys in the identification of seeds in Allegheny County, Pennsylvania.

In 1926, she began work at Newcomb College, which was then the women's department of Tulane University in New Orleans, teaching zoology and botany. She worked there until 1932. She then embarked on a trip to the British colony Malaya.

In 1933, on her return to the United States, she began work as a junior pathologist, and then as a botanist at the Bureau of Plant Industry in Washington, D.C., later named the United States Forest Service, where she worked until her death.

== Death ==
Bomhard died in Glenshaw, Pennsylvania in 1952, aged 54.

== Membership of societies ==
She was a member of many organisations, including:

- American Association for the Advancement of Science
- American Society of Plant Taxonomists
- Botanical Society of Washington
- Ecological Society of America
- International Association for Plant Taxonomy
- New Orleans Society of Plant Sciences
- Society of American Foresters
- Washington Academy of Sciences

== Publications ==
- The Wax Palms (1930)
- Range Plant Handbook (1937)
- Standardized Plant Names (1942). Contributor,
- Palm trees in the United States (1950). Contributor.
- Sourcebook of forage plants on longleaf pine - bluestem ranges of Louisiana (1952). Co-author.
