= Bastiaan Jacob Dirk Meeuse =

American botanist and naturalist

- Born: 9 May 1916; Sukabumi, West Java, Dutch East Indies
- Died: 27 July 1999 (aged 83); Kirkland, Washington
- Occupations: Botanist and Naturalist

Bastiaan Jacob Dirk Meeuse (9 May 1916 – 27 July 1999) was a botanist and naturalist.
