= Paul Constant Billot =

French botanist (1796–1863)

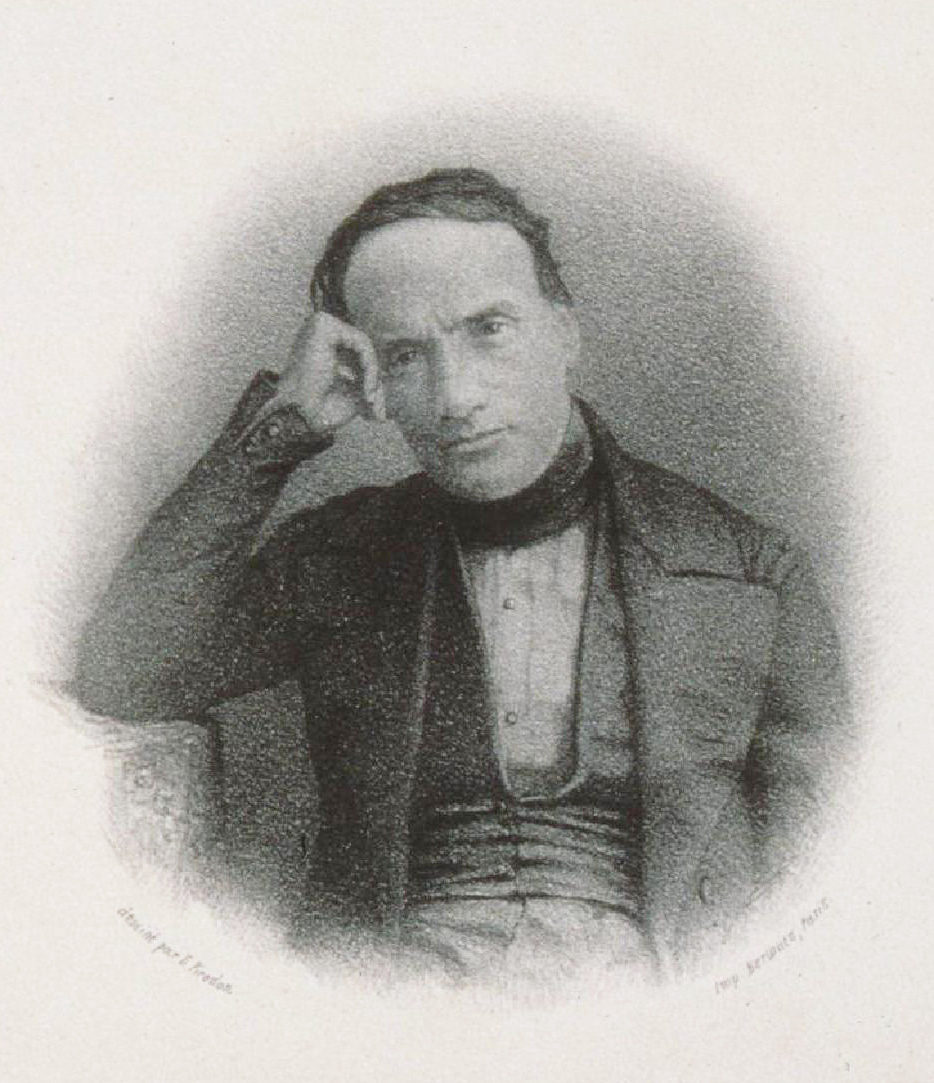
Paul Constant Billot

Paul Constant Billot (English: /biːˈjoʊ/ bee-YOH, French: [pɔl kɔ̃stɑ̃ bijo]; 12 March 1796 – 19 April 1863) was a French botanist born in Rambervillers.

He studied at the University of Strasbourg, subsequently leaving school due to illness. From 1830 he worked as a civil servant (conductor of ponts et chaussées), earning his bachelor's degree a few years later. From 1834 to 1861 he taught classes in physics and natural history in Haguenau.

With botanist Friedrich Wilhelm Schultz (1804–1876), he was co-author of Archives de la flore de France et d'Allemagne. Billot's Annotations a la flore de France et d'Allemagne (1855) was added by the distribution of the exsiccata series Flora Galliae et Germaniae exsiccata (1846-1861), a work which after his death in 1863 was continued by other scientists under the title Flora exsiccata de C. Billot, continué par V. Bavoux, A. Guichard, P. Guichard et J. Paillot or "Billotia".

Today his herbarium is kept at the Muséum d'histoire naturelle in Nantes.
