= Gertrude Simmons Burlingham =

Early 20th-century American mycologist

Gertrude Simmons Burlingham (April 21, 1872 – January 11, 1952) was an early-20th-century mycologist best known for her work on American Russula and Lactarius and pioneering the use of microscopic spore features and iodine staining for species identification.

== Biography ==
Gertrude Simmons Burlingham was born in Lambs Corner, a farm outside Mexico, New York, on April 21, 1872, as the only child of Alfred Burlingham and his wife Mary Simmons. She graduated from Mexico High School to study botany at Syracuse University. She received her Bachelor of Science degree with a thesis on the comparative morphology of Asplenium bulbiferum in 1896, at the age of 24. While a student at Syracuse, she became a member of Kappa Alpha Theta. After graduating, she took a position as a biology teacher at Ovid Union School in Ovid, New York, where she quickly rose to become preceptress, or principal. She moved to Binghamton, New York, in 1898 to teach high school biology, and then to New York City for a postgraduate degree at Columbia University. After finishing her Ph.D. in 1908 she taught biology at Brooklyn's Eastern District High School until her retirement in 1934. Despite earning a Ph.D. from Columbia University in 1908, she never taught at college level.

As a postgraduate, she worked primarily at the New York Botanical Garden (NYBG) under an agreement between that institution and Columbia University for doctoral studies, the first woman to gain a Ph.D. from the program. At the garden, she collaborated with William A. Murrill (she would eventually name Russula murrillii after him). Soon after starting her scientific career, she began spending a lot of time in Vermont, where she owned a secondary home in Newfane, Windham County, an area that was the topic of her very first scientific publication.

Tribe Lactarieae, formed of the genera Lactarius (which she called Lactaria) and Russula, was her specialty and the topic of both her doctoral thesis (published in the Memoirs of the Torrey Botanical Club) as well as the majority of her publications, such as the 1910 treatment of the tribe for the North American Flora. The exsiccata-like series that she issued 1910 has the title The Lactariae of North America. Russula specialist Ray Fatto credited Burlingham with noting the importance of spore ornamentation in separating the species of this notoriously troublesome genus. Although some authors, like Michael Kuo, have disputed the usefulness of that criterion, it has remained of great importance in the absence of genetic research to clarify the status of many species. In his obituary, Fred J. Seaver says that "[s]he had a wide knowledge of the fungi in general and having grown up on a farm she was an all-round naturalist."

After she retired from teaching in 1934, she moved to Winter Park, Florida with her lifelong partner Louise Hayt, joining there several other retired mycologists, and collaborated primarily with Henry Curtis Beardslee (she would also name a Russula after him, and write his obituary). She collected primarily in the Northeast and Florida, but also the Pacific Northwest and on one occasion, traveled to Scandinavia in 1930 where she worked with Lars Romell, Seth Lundell and Jakob Lange. She died in her Winter Park, Florida, home on January 11, 1952, from an unspecified illness and was buried on Newfane Hill at her own request.

Her papers, personal library (including some rare early works) and 10,000 specimens herbarium were bequeathed to the NYBG, where she funded a fellowship to allow for students of mycology to use the garden's facilities. This fellowship was granted to 27 students between 1956 and 1994. Her papers at the library include a large correspondence covering 40 years, research papers and manuscripts, field notes, several hundred pictures and glass negatives (mostly of specimens), as well as some 60 watercolor illustrations by fellow mycologist Ann Hibbard.

== Selected publications ==
For a more complete list, see Seaver's obituary.

- Burlingham, G. S. (1910). "Agaricaceae – Lactaria". North American Flora 9 (3): 172–200.
- _______________ (1915). "Agaricaceae – Lactarieae". North American Flora 9 (4): 201–236.
- _______________ (1944). "Studies in North American russulae". Mycologia 36: 104–120. JSTOR 3754882
- _______________ (1945). "Noteworthy species of Lepiota and Lactaria". Mycologia 37: 53–64. JSTOR 3754850
- _______________ (1948). "Henry Curtis Beardslee". Mycologia 40: 505–506. JSTOR 3755255

== Eponymous species ==
Three species of fungi have been named in honor of Gertrude Burlingham:

- Entoloma burlinghamiae Murrill 1917
- Russula burlinghamiae Singer 1938
- Rhizopogon burlinghamii A.H.Sm. 1966

== See also ==
- List of mycologists
