= List of authors of South African botanical taxa =

Standard abbreviations of authors who have named South African plants

List of authors of South African botanical taxa is a list of authors who have named South African plants and the standard abbreviations used for those authors in the botanical literature.

The entry for each author is given on a single line showing their name, dates and other names by which they have been known. Following this comes a list of the major groups they have worked on, separated by commas, and finally the standard form for their name (in bold).

== The major groups are ==
- S - Spermatophytes/Phanerogams (flowering plants and gymnosperms)
- M - Fungi and Lichens (Mycology)
- A - Algae
- P - Pteridophytes
- B - Bryophytes
- F - Fossils
- L - Pre-Linnaean (from 'Stafleu & Cowan 1976)
- C - Cryptogamic (from 'Stafleu & Cowan 1976)

The dates given are those of birth and death where one or both are available. If neither is known, a date on which the author is known to have published a name (usually the earliest if more than one is known) is given preceded by 'fl.' (floruit).

== A ==
- Robert Stephen Adamson (1885–1965) S ........ **Adamson**
- Adam Afzelius (1750–1837) M, P, S ........ **Afzel.**
- William Aiton (1731–1793) P, S ........ **Aiton**
- Ove Almborn (1914–1992) M ........ **Almb.**
- Arthur Hugh Garfit Alston (1902–1958) P, S ........ **Alston**
- John Graham Anderson (1926–1970) S ........ **J.G.Anderson**
- Thomas Anderson (1832–1870) S ........ **T.Anderson**
- William Anderson (1750–1778) S ........ **W.Anderson**
- Nils Johan Andersson (1821–1880) P, S ........ **N.J.Andersson**
- Eily Edith Agnes Archibald (1916-) S ........ **Archibald**
- R.E.M. Archibald (1940-) A ........ **R.E.M.Archibald**
- Edward Armitage (1822–1906) S ........ **Arm.**
- Trevor Henry Arnold (1947-) S ........ **T.H.Arnold**
- George Arnott Walker-Arnott (1799–1868) A, P, M, S ........ **Arn.**
- Edwin Ashby (1861–1941) S ........ **Ashby**
- Andre Aubreville (1897–1982) S ........ **Aubrév.**

== B ==
- Franz Ewald Theodor Bachmann (1850–1937) B, M ........ **Bachm.**
- James Backhouse (1794–1869) P, S ........ **Backh.**
- Himansu Baijnath (1943-) S ........ **Baijnath**
- Henri Ernest Baillon (1827–1895) B, M, P, S ........ **Baill.**
- Hugh Arthur Baker (1896–1976) S ........ **H.A.Baker**
- Joseph Banks (1743–1820) S ........ **Banks**
- Arthur S. Barclay (1932-) S ........ **A.S.Barclay**
- Winsome Fanny Barker (1907-) S ........ **W.F.Barker**
- Thomas Theodore Barnard (1898–1983) A, S ........ **Barnard**
- John Barrow (1764–1848) S ........ **Barrow**
- Friedrich Gottlieb Bartling (1798–1875) S ........ **Bartl.**
- Ferdinand Lukas Bauer (1760–1826) S ........ **F.L.Bauer**
- Martin Bruce Bayer (1935-) S ........ **M.B.Bayer**
- John Stanley Beard (1916-) S ........ **Beard**
- Odoardo Beccari (1843–1920) A, M, P, S ........ **Becc.**
- Thomas W. Naylor Beckett (1838–1906) B ........ **Beckett**
- Charles Paulus Belanger (1805–1881) B, M, P, S ........ **Bél.**
- Arthur Bennett (1843–1929) S ........ **A.Benn.**
- George Bentham (1800–1884) M, P, S ........ **Benth.**
- Cornelius C. Berg (1934-) S ........ **C.C.Berg**
- Otto Karl (Carl) Berg (1815–1866) S ........ **O.Berg**
- Ernst Friedrich Berger (1814–1853) S ........ **Berger**
- Karl Heinrich Bergius (1790–1818) S ........ **K.Bergius**
- Johann Jakob Bernhardi (1774–1850) B, M, P, S ........ **Bernh.**
- Antonio Bertoloni (1775–1869) A, B, M, P, S ........ **Bertol.**
- John William Bews (1884–1938) S ........ **Bews**
- Peter Johan Bladh (1746–1816) S ........ **Bladh**
- Ralph Anthony Blakelock (1915–1963) S ........ **Blakelock**
- Carl Magnus Blom (1737–1815) S ........ **Blom**
- Carl Ludwig Blume (1796–1862) B, M, P, S ........ **Blume**
- Pierre Edmond Boissier (1810–1885) M, P, S ........ **Boiss.**
- Louis Hyacinthe Boivin (1808–1852) S ........ **Boivin**
- Carl (Karl) August Bolle (1821–1909) B, P, S ........ **Bolle**
- Frank Bolus (1870–1945) S ........ **F.Bolus**
- Harriet Margaret Louisa Bolus née Kensit (1877–1970) S ........ **L.Bolus**
- Harry Bolus (1834–1911) S ........ **Bolus**
- Joseph (Jean) Edouard Bommer (1829–1895) M, P, S ........ **J.Bommer**
- Pauline Bond (1917–2010) S ........ **Bond**
- Aime Jacques Alexandre Bonpland (1773–1858) A, P, S ........ **Bonpl.**
- Leonard Alfred Boodle (1865–1941) A, S ........ **Boodle**
- Jan Justus Bos (1939-) S ........ **Bos**
- Averil Maud Bottomley (1889–1984) M ........ **Bottomley**
- Charles Boucher (1944-) S ........ **C.Boucher**
- James Bowie (1789–1869) S ........ **Bowie**
- Cornelis Eliza Bertus Bremekamp (1888–1984) P, S ........ **Bremek.**
- John Patrick Micklethwait Brenan (1917–1985) P, S ........ **Brenan**
- Johann Christian Breutel (1788–1875) B, S ........ **Breutel**
- Lillian Louisa Britten (1886–1952) S ........ **L.L.Britten**
- Adolphe Theodore (de) Brongniart (1801–1876) A, B, F, M, P, S ........ **Brongn.**
- Nicholas Edward Brown (1849–1934) A, S ........ **N.E.Br.**
- Robert Brown (1773–1858) B, M, P, S ........ **R.Br.**
- Eileen Adelaide Bruce (1905–1955) S ........ **E.A.Bruce**
- Jean Guillaume Bruguiere (1750–1798) S ........ **Brug.**
- Richard Kenneth Brummitt (1937-) S ........ **Brummitt**
- Josef Brunnthaler (1871–1914) A, B ........ **Brunnth.**
- Peter Vincent Bruyns (1957-) S ........ **Bruyns**
- John Buchanan (1819–1898) B, S ........ **Buchanan**
- Francis Buchanan-Hamilton (1762–1829) P, S ........ **Buch.-Ham.**
- Arthur Allman Bullock (1906–1980) S ........ **Bullock**
- Charles James Fox Bunbury (1809–1886) S ........ **Bunbury**
- William John Burchell (1781–1863) B, P, S ........ **Burch.**
- Johannes Burman (1707–1779) P, S ........ **Burm.**
- (Maximilian) Karl Ewald Burret (1883–1964) S ........ **Burret**
- Brian Laurence Burtt ('Bill') (1913-) S ........ **B.L.Burtt**
- Joseph Burtt Davy (1870–1940) S ........ **Burtt Davy**

== C ==
- George Caley (1770–1829) S ........ **Caley**
- Jacques Cambessèdes (1799–1863) B, S ........ **Cambess.**
- Alphonse Pyramus de Candolle (1806–1893) S ........ **A.DC.**
- Anne Casimir Pyramus de Candolle (1836–1918) S ........ **C.DC.**
- Sherwin Carlquist (1930-) S ........ **Carlquist**
- Dugald Carmichael (1772–1827) A, M, P, S ........ **Carmich.**
- Cedric Errol Carr (1892–1936) S ........ **Carr**
- François-Louis Laporte, comte de Castelnau (1802–1880) S ........ **Castelnau**
- Ludolf Karl Adelbert von Chamisso (1781–1838) A, B, P, S ........ **Cham.**
- Ernest Entwistle Cheesman (1898-) S ........ **Cheesman**
- Auguste Jean Baptiste Chevalier (1873–1956) B, P, S ........ **A.Chev.**
- Emilio Chiovenda (1871–1941) A, B, P, S ........ **Chiov.**
- Lucy Katherine (Kathleen) Armitage Chippindall (1913–1992) S ........ **Chippind.**
- Béla Jenő Cholnoky (1899–1972) A ........ **Cholnoky**
- Hugh (Harold) Basil Christian (1871–1950) S ........ **Christian**
- Martha Isabella Claassen (1931-) A ........ **Claassen**
- Charles Baron Clarke (1832–1906) P, S ........ **C.B.Clarke**
- Leslie Edward Wostall Codd (1908–1999) S ........ **Codd**
- Hester Coetzee (1945-) S ........ **Coetzee**
- Desmond Thorne Cole (1922-2018) S ........ **D.T.Cole**
- (John) William Colenso (1811–1899) B, M, P, S ........ **Colenso**
- Robert Harold Compton (1886–1979) A, P, S ........ **Compton**
- Paul Conrath (1861–1931) S ........ **Conrath**
- Francois Marie Louis Corbiere (1850–1941) B, S ........ **Corb.**
- Edred John Henry Corner (1906-) M, S ........ **Corner**
- Léon Camille Marius Croizat (1894–1982) S ........ **Croizat**

== D ==
- Rolf Dahlgren (1932–1987) S ........ **R.Dahlgren**
- Ivan Robert Dale (1904–1963) S ........ **Dale**
- William Dallimore (1871–1959) S ........ **Dallim.**
- William Dampier (1652–1715) L ........ **Dampier**
- Lynette Elizabeth Davidson (1916–1996) S ........ **L.E.Davidson**
- Jean Odon Debeaux (1826–1910) M, S ........ **Debeaux**
- Joseph Decaisne (1807–1882) A, P, S ........ **Decne.**
- Ellen Marion Delf (1883–1980) A ........ **Delf**
- Alire Raffeneau Delile (1778–1850) A, B, M, P, S ........ **Delile**
- Bernard M. Descoings (fl. 1967) S......................**Desc.**
- Rene Louiche Desfontaines (1750–1833) A, B, M, P, S ........ **Desf.**
- Miriam Phoebe de Vos (1912-) S ........ **M.P.de Vos**
- Johannes Marthinus Jacob de Wet (1927-) S ........ **de Wet**
- Emile August(e) Joseph De Wildeman (1866–1947) M, P, S ........ **De Wild.**
- Bernard de Winter (1924-) S ........ **De Winter**
- Gordon Parker DeWolf (1927-) S ........ **DeWolf**
- Didrik Ferdinand Didrichsen (1814–1887) S ........ **Didr.**
- Friedrich Ludwig Emil Diels (1874–1945) B, P, S ........ **Diels**
- Moritz Kurt Dinter (1868–1945) S ........ **Dinter**
- Barend Jacobus Dippenaar (1902-) M ........ **Dippen.**
- Ethel Doidge (1887–1965) M ........ **Doidge**
- David Don (1799–1841) M, P, S ........ **D.Don**
- George Don (1798–1856) B, P, S ........ **G.Don**
- Emmanuel Drake del Castillo (1855–1904) P, S ........ **Drake**
- Carl Friedrich (Charles Frederick) Drège (1791–1867) S ........ **C.F.Drège**
- Jean Francois (Johann Franz) Drège (1794–1881) A, B, S ........ **Drège**
- George Claridge Druce (1850–1932) P, S ........ **Druce**
- Robert Bailey Drummond (1924-) S ........ **R.B.Drumm.**
- Denise van Druten (1930-) S ........ **Druten**
- Marcel Marie Maurice Dubard (1873–1914) S ........ **Dubard**
- Noëlle Dumaz-le-Grand (fl. 1953) S ........ **Dumaz-le-Grand**
- Richard Arnold Dümmer (1887–1922) S ........ **Dümmer**
- Edward John Dunn (1844–1937) S ........ **E.J.Dunn**
- Stephen Troyte Dunn (1868–1938) P, S ........ **Dunn**
- Stephanus Johannes du Plessis (1908-) M ........ **du Plessis**
- Hein Johannes During (1947-) B ........ **During**
- Augusta Vera Duthie (1881–1963) B, P, S ........ **A.V.Duthie**
- Alexander Logie du Toit F ........ **A.L.du Toit**
- Petrus (Pierre) Cornelis Vermeulen Du Toit (1945-) S ........ **Du Toit**
- Robert Allen Dyer (1900–1987) S ........ **R.A.Dyer**
- William Turner Thiselton-Dyer (1843–1928) P, S ........ **Dyer**

== E ==
- Christian Friedrich (Frederik) Ecklon (1795–1868) S ........ **Eckl**.
- Albert Eicker (1935-) M ........ **Eicker**
- Joan Elffers (1928-) (=Mrs Munday) S ........ **Elffers**
- George Francis Scott-Elliot (1862–1934) S ........ **G.Elliot**
- Roger Pearson Ellis (1944-) S ........ **R.P.Ellis**
- Stephan Friedrich Ladislaus Endlicher (1804–1849) A, B, F, M, P, S ........ **Endl.**
- Heinrich Gustav Adolf Engler (1844–1930) A, B, M, P, S ........ **Engl.**
- Johann Friedrich Gustav von Eschscholtz (1793–1831) S ........ **Eschsch.**
- Elsie Elizabeth Esterhuysen (1912–2006) S ........ **Esterh.**
- Maurice Smethurst Evans (1854–1920) S ........ **M.S.Evans**
- William Edgar Evans (1882–1963) S ........ **W.E.Evans**
- Arthur Wallis Exell (1901–1993) S ........ **Exell**

== F ==
- Arthur Robert Fairall (1920–1970) S ........ **Fairall**
- David Fairchild (1869–1954) S ........ **D.Fairchild**
- Abilio Fernandes (1906–1994) S ........ **A.Fern.**
- Rosette Mercedes Saraiva Batarda Fernandes (1916–2005) P, S ........ **R.Fern.**
- Francisco Manoel Carlos de Mello de Ficalho (1837–1903) S ........ **Ficalho**
- Adriano Fiori (1865–1950) M, P, S ........ **Fiori**
- Helena Madelain Lamond Forbes (1900–1959) S ........ **H.M.L.Forbes**
- John Forbes (1798–1823) S ........ **Forbes**
- Peter Forsskål (1732–1763) A, P, S ......**Forssk.**
- Johann Reinhold Forster (1729–1798) S ........ **J.R.Forst.**
- Henry Georges Fourcade (1865–1948) S ........ **Fourc.**
- Eugene Pierre Nicolas Fournier (1834–1884) P, S ........ **E.Fourn.**
- Paul Victor Fournier (1877–1964) P, S ........ **P.Fourn.**
- Robert O. Fournier A ........ **R.O.Fourn.**
- Millicent Franks (=Mrs Flanders)(1886–1961) S ........ **Franks**
- Johannes Frenzel A ........ **Frenzel**
- Johann Baptist Georg (George) Wolfgang Fresenius (1808–1866) A, M, S ........ **Fresen.**
- Klas Robert Elias Fries (1876–1966) M, P, S ........ **R.E.Fr.**
- Thore Christian Elias Fries (1886–1930) M, S ........ **T.C.E.Fr.**
- Ib Friis (1945-) S ........ **Friis**
- Felix Eugen Fritsch (1832–1893) A ........ **F.E.Fritsch**

== G ==
- Ernest Edward Galpin (1858–1941) S ........ **Galpin**
- Star Garabedjan (1895–1978) S ........ **Garab.**
- Christian August Friedrich Garcke (1819–1904) S ........ **Garcke**
- Sidney Garside (1889–1961) B ........ **Garside**
- Charles Gaudichaud-Beaupre (1789–1854) A, B, M, P, S ........ **Gaudich.**
- Howard Scott Gentry (1903-) S ........ **Gentry**
- Gerrit Germishuizen (1950-) S ........ **Germish.**
- William Tyrer Gerrard ( -1866) P, S ........ **Gerrard**
- Jacob Gerstner (1888–1948) S ........ **Gerstner**
- Birenda Nath Ghose (1885–1983) S ........ **Ghose**
- Johan Wilhelm Heinrich Giess (1910-) S ........ **Giess**
- Malcolm Hutchison Giffen (1902-) A ........ **Giffen**
- Ernest Friedrich Gilg (1867–1933) S ........ **Gilg**
- Jan Bevington Gillett (1911-) S ........ **J.B.Gillett**
- Margaret Clark Gillett (1878–1962) S ........ **Gillett**
- Hamish Boyd Gilliland (1911–1965) S ........ **Gilliland**
- Hugh Francis Glen (1950-) S ........ **Glen**
- Johann Friedrich Gmelin (1748–1804) A, B, M, P, S ........ **J.F.Gmel.**
- Wouter Adriaan Goddijn (1884–1960) P, S ........ **Goddijn**
- Karl Christian Traugott Friedemann Goebel (1794–1851) S ........ **Goebel**
- Peter Goldblatt (1943-) S ........ **Goldblatt**
- Antonie Petrus Gerhardus Goossens (1896–1972) S ........ **Gooss.**
- Kathleen Dixon Huntley Gordon-Gray (1918-) B, S ........ **Gordon-Gray**
- Gerhard Jacobus Marinus Anne Gorter (1913-) M ........ **G.J.M.Gorter**
- Constantine Goulimis (1886–1963) S ........ **Goulimis**
- Hans Rudolph Jurke Grau (1937-) S ........ **Grau**
- Percy James Greenway (1897–1980) S ........ **Greenway**
- Leopold Hartley Grindon (1818–1904) S ........ **Grindon**
- B.H. Groenewald S ........ **Groenew.**
- Valery Ivanovich Grubov (1917-) P, S ........ **Grubov**
- Jean Baptiste Antoine Guillemin (1796–1842) A, P, S ........ **Guill.**
- Georg Julius Ernst Gurich (1859–1938) A, F ........ **Gürich**
- Robert Louis August Maximilian Gürke (1854–1911) S ........ **Gürke**
- Francis Guthrie (1831–1899) S ........ **Guthrie**
- Louise Guthrie (1879–1966) S ........ **L.Guthrie**

== H ==
- Norbert Hahn (1966-) S ........ **N.Hahn**
- Anthony Vincent Hall (1936-) S ........ **A.V.Hall**
- Harry Hall (1906–1986) S ........ **Harry Hall**
- Lisabel Irene Hall (née Booysen)(fl. 1984) S ........ **L.I.Hall**
- Ove Juel Hansen (1945-) S ........ **O.J.Hansen**
- Thomas Hardwicke (1757–1835) S ........ **Hardw.**
- David Spencer Hardy (1931-) S ........ **D.S.Hardy**
- Hermann August Theodor Harms (1870–1942) S ........ **Harms**
- Errol Rhodes Harrison (1925-) S ........ **E.R.Harrison**
- Heidrun Elsbeth Klara Hartmann (née Osterwald) (1942-) S ........ **H.E.K.Hartmann**
- William Henry Harvey (1811–1866) A, B, M, S ........ **Harv.**
- Johan Coenraad van Hasselt (1797–1823) M, S ........ **Hasselt**
- Adrian Hardy Haworth (1768–1833) S ........ **Haw.**
- Friedrich Gottlob Hayne (1763–1832) S ........ **Hayne**
- Hermann Heino Heine (1922-) P, S ........ **Heine**
- William Botting Hemsley (1843–1924) A, P, S ........ **Hemsl.**
- Mayda Doris Henderson (1928-) S ........ **M.D.Hend.**
- Murray Ross Henderson (1899–1982) S ........ **M.R.Hend.**
- Esmee Franklin Hennessy (fl. 1986) S ........ **Hennessy**
- Charles Louis L'Heritier de Brutelle (1746–1800) P, S ........ **L'Hér.**
- Paul Hermann (Dutch 1646–1695) L ........ **Herm.**
- Adolar Gottlieb Julius Herre (1895–1979) S ........ **A.G.J.Herre**
- Florence Ellen Hewitt (1910–1979) A ........ **Hewitt**
- William Philip Hiern (1839–1925) B, S ........ **Hiern**
- Olive Mary Hilliard (née Hillary)(1925–2022) S ........ **Hilliard**
- Albert Spear Hitchcock (1865–1935) P, S ........ **Hitchc.**
- Benedict Pierre Georges Hochreutiner (1873–1959) S ........ **Hochr.**
- Christian Ferdinand Friedrich Hochstetter (1787–1860) A, M, P, S ........ **Hochst.**
- Christian Gottlob Ferdinand von Hochstetter (1829–1884) S ........ **C.G.F.Hochst.**
- Walter Hendricks Hodge (1912-) P, S ........ **Hodge**
- Kathe(Kaethe) Hoffmann (1883–c.1931) S ........ **K.Hoffm.**
- Karl August Otto Hoffmann (1853–1909) S ........ **O.Hoffm.**
- Edward Morell Holmes (1843–1930) A, S ........ **Holmes**
- Ove Arbo Hoeg (1898-) A, F, M ........ **Hoeg**
- Joseph Dalton Hooker (1817–1911) A, B, M, P, S ........ **Hook.f.**
- William Jackson Hooker (1785–1865) A, B, M, P, S ........ **Hook.**
- A.J.Ward Hornby (1893-) A ........ **Hornby**
- David Hornby (fl. 1977) M ........ **D.Hornby**
- Claës Fredrik Hornstedt (1758–1809) S ........ **Hornst.**
- Gottfried Eduard Huber-Pestalozzi (1877–1966) A ........ **Hub.-Pest.**
- Jean-Henri Humbert (1887–1967) P, S ........ **Humbert**
- John Hutchinson (1884–1972) S ........ **Hutch.**

== I ==
- Hans-Dieter Ihlenfeldt (1932-) S ........ **Ihlenf.**
- Kathleen Leonore Immelman (1955-) S ........ **Immelman**
- Collingwood Ingram (1880–1981) S ........ **Ingram**
- Edward George Irving (1816–1855) S ........ **Irving**
- Frances Margaret (Leighton) Isaac (1909-) S ........ **Isaac**
- William Edwyn Isaac (1905-) A ........ **W.E.Isaac**

== J ==
- William Jack (1795–1822) S ........ **Jack**
- Marius Jacobs (1929–1983) S ........ **M.Jacobs**
- Niels Henning Gunther Jacobsen (1941-) P, S ........ **N.Jacobsen**
- Werner Bahne Georg Jacobsen (1909-) P, S ........ **W.Jacobsen**
- Amy Jacot Guillarmod (1911–1992) M, S ........ **Jacot Guill.**
- Nikolaus Joseph von Jacquin (1727–1817) A, B, M, P, S ........ **Jacq.**
- John Peter Jessop (1939-) P, S ........ **Jessop**
- Wouter Johannes Jooste (1933-) M ........ **Jooste**
- Adrien-Henri de Jussieu (1797–1853) S ........ **A.Juss.**

== K ==
- Cornelis Kalkman (1928–1998) S ........ **Kalkman**
- (Maria) Caroline Karsten (1902-) S ........ **M.C.Karst.**
- Ronald William John Keay (1920–1998) S ........ **Keay**
- John Bellenden Ker Gawler (1764–1842) ........ **Ker Gawl**
- Lars Erik Kers (1931-) M, S ........ **Kers**
- Pauline Kies (=Mrs Bohnen)(1918–1999) S ........ **Kies**
- Donald Joseph Boomer Killick (1926-) S ........ **Killick**
- John William Carnegie Kirk (1878–1962) S ........ **J.W.C.Kirk**
- Thomas Kirk (1828–1898) P, S ........ **Kirk**
- Friedrich Wilhelm Klatt (1825–1897) A ........ **Klatt**
- Anthonia Kleinhoonte (1887–1960/1) S ........ **Kleinhoonte**
- Johann Friedrich Klotzsch (1805–1860) M, P, S ........ **Klotzsch**
- Emil Friedrich Knoblauch (1864–1936) S ........ **Knobl.**
- Karl Heinrich Emil Koch (1809–1879) P, S ........ **K.Koch**
- Johann Gerhard Konig (1728–1785) B, M, P, S ........ **J.König**
- Friedrich August Körnicke (1828–1908) M, P, S ........ **Körn.**
- Karl Georg Theodor Kotschy (1813–1866) B, S ........ **Kotschy**
- Richard Kräusel (1890–1966) A, B, F, M ........ **Kräusel**
- Christian Ferdinand Friedrich von Krauss (1812–1890) A, B, S ........ **C.Krauss**
- Johan Carl Krauss (1759–1826) S ........ **Krauss**
- Georg Ludwig Engelhard Krebs (1792–1844) S ........ **Krebs**
- Heinrich Kuhl (1796–1821) M, S ........ **Kuhl**
- Otto Carl Ernst Kuntze (1843–1907) A, B, F, M, P, S ........ **Kuntze**
- Wilhelm Sulpiz Kurz (1834–1878) P, S ........ **Kurz**

== L ==
- Jacques-Julien Houtou de Labillardiere (1755–1834) A, M, P, S ........ **Labill.**
- Carl von Linnaeus (1707–1778) A, B, M, P, S ........ **L.**
- Herman Johannes Lam (1892–1977) B, P, S ........ **H.J.Lam**
- Jean Baptiste Antoine Pierre de Monnet de Lamarck (1744–1829) A, M, P, S ........ **Lam.**
- Joseph Lanjouw (1902–1984) S ........ **Lanj.**
- Elaine Margaret Laughton (née Young)(1898–1974) M ........ **Laughton**
- Mary Gwendolene Lavis (=Mrs O'Connor-Fenton)(1902-) S ........ **Lavis**
- John Jacob Lavranos (1926–2018) S ........ **Lavranos**
- Leslie Charles Leach (1909–1996) S ........ **L.C.Leach**
- Anthonius Josephus Maria Leeuwenberg (1930-) S ........ **Leeuwenb.**
- Johann Georg Christian Lehmann (1792–1860) A, B, P, S ........ **Lehm.**
- Friedrich Ernst Leibold (1804–1864) S ........ **Leibold**
- Frances Margaret Leighton (=Mrs WE Isaac)(1909–2006) S ........ **F.M.Leight.**
- Otto Albrecht Leistner (1931-) S ........ **Leistner**
- Charles Antoine Lemaire (1801–1871) P, S ........ **Lem.**
- François Mathias René Leprieur (1799–1869) M, P, S ........ **Lepr.**
- Stephanus Francois Le Roux (1915–1976) F ........ **Le Roux**
- Christian Friedrich Lessing (1809–1862) A, M, S ........ **Less.**
- Pierre Adolphe Lesson (1805–1888) S ........ **A.Lesson**
- Cythna Lindenberg Letty (1895–1985) S ........ **Letty**
- Carl Tore Christian Levring (1913–1980) A ........ **Levring**
- Margaret Rutherford Bryan Levyns (née Michell)(1890–1975) S ........ **Levyns**
- Gwendoline Joyce Lewis (1909–1967) S ........ **G.J.Lewis**
- Martin Heinrich Karl von Lichtenstein (1780–1857) S ........ **Licht.**
- Gustav Lindau (1866–1923) M, P, S ........ **Lindau**
- Johann Bernhard Wilhelm Lindenberg (1781–1851) A, B, S ........**Lindenb.**
- Hans Peter Linder (1954-) S ........ **H.P.Linder**
- Ray/Roy Charles Littlewood (1924–1967) S ........ **Littlew.**
- Ludwig Eduard Theodor Loesener (1865–1941) S ........ **Loes.**
- E.E.M. Loock (1905–1973) S ........ **Loock**
- Giuseppe Lopriore (1865–1928) S ........ **Lopr.**
- Johannes Paulus Lotsy (1867–1931) M, P, S ........ **Lotsy**
- Joao de Loureiro (1717–1791) A, B, P, S ........ **Lour.**
- Carl August Luckhoff (1914–1960) S ........ **C.A.Lückh.**
- Hilmar Albert Luckhoff (1916-) S ........ **H.A.Lückh.**
- Wilhelm Jan Lutjeharms (1907–1983) M, S ........ **Lütjeh.**

== M ==
- Peter MacOwan (1830–1909) M, S ........ **MacOwan**
- Wessel Marais (1929-) S ........ **Marais**
- Charles Dwight Marsh (1855–1932) S ........ **Marsh**
- Carl Friedrich Philipp von Martius (1794–1868) A, M, P, S ........ **Mart.**
- Maxwell Tylden Masters (1833–1907) P, S ........ **Mast.**
- Alan Percy Douglas McClean (1902-) S ........ **McClean**
- James McGibbon (fl. 1848–1864) S ........ **McGibb.**
- Mark Johnston McKen (1823–1872) P, S ........ **McKen**
- Patrick Gordon McNeil (1908–1986) S ........ **McNeil**
- Robert Earle Magill (1947-) B, S ........ **Magill**
- Wessel Marais (1929-) S ........ **Marais**
- Walter Friedrich Otto Marasas (1941-) M, S ........ **Marasas**
- Erika Irene Markotter (1905~06–1983) S ........ **Markötter**
- Hermann Wilhelm Rudolf Marloth (1855–1931) S ........ **Marloth**
- Judith Anne Marsh (=Mrs Hutchings)(1951-) S ........ **J.A.Marsh**
- Francis Masson (1741–1805) S ........ **Masson**
- Joseph (`Jimmy') William Mathews (1871–1949) S ........ **J.W.Mathews**
- Adrianus Dirk Jacob Meeuse (1914-) S ........ **A.Meeuse**
- Robert Desmond Meikle (1923-) S ........ **Meikle**
- Carl Daniel Friedrich Meisner (1800–1874) S ........ **Meisn.**
- Archibald Menzies (1754–1842) B, P, S ........ **Menzies**
- Elmer Drew Merrill (1876–1956) M, P, S ........ **Merr.**
- Hermann Merxmüller (1920–1988) M, S ........ **Merxm.**
- Ernst Heinrich Friedrich Meyer (1791–1858) B, S ........ **E.Mey.**
- Paul Gerhard Meyer (1934-) S ........ **P.G.Mey.**
- Carl Christian Mez (1866–1944) S ........ **Mez**
- Margaret Rutherford Michell (=Mrs Levyns) A ........ **Michell**
- John Miers (1789–1879) P, S ........ **Miers**
- Gottfried Wilhelm Johannes Mildbraed (1879–1954) B, P, S ........ **Mildbr.**
- Oliphant Bell Miller (1882–1966) S ........ O.B.Mill.
- Edgar Wolston Bertram Handsley Milne-Redhead (1906-) S ........ **Milne-Redh.**
- Friedrich Anton Wilhelm Miquel (1811–1871) A, B, M, P, S ........ **Miq.**
- Philip Miller (1691–1771) S ........ **Mill.**
- Charles Francois Brisseau de Mirbel (1776–1854) B, P, S ........ **Mirb.**
- David Searle Mitchell (1935-) P, S ........ **D.S.Mitch.**
- Rodney Oliver Moffett (1937-) S ........ **Moffett**
- Albert Oliver Dean Mogg (1886–1979) S ........**Mogg**
- Spencer Le Marchant Moore (1850–1931) S ........ **S.Moore**
- Henry Nottidge Moseley (1844–1890) S ........ **H.Moseley**
- Charles Edward Moss (1870–1930) S ........ **Moss**
- Margaret Moss (née Heatley)(1885–1953) S ........ **M.Moss**
- P.J. Muller (fl. 1973) M ........ **P.J.Mull.bis**
- Johannes (Jean) Muller Argoviensis (1828–1896) A, B, M, P, S ........ **Müll.Arg.**
- Dietrich Muller-Doblies (1938-) S ........ **D.Müll.-Doblies**
- Ute Muller-Doblies (1938-) S ........ **U.Müll.-Doblies**
- Johannes Ludwig Leopold Mund (1791–1831) S ........ **Mund**

== N ==
- Gustav Hermann Nachtigal (1834–1885) S ........ **Nacht.**
- Christian Gottfried Daniel Nees von Esenbeck (1776–1858) A, B, M, P, S ........ **Nees**
- Gert Cornelius Nel (1885–1950) S ........ **Nel**
- David Nelson) ( -1789) S ........ **Nelson**
- (David) James Niven (1774–1826)/(1776–1828) S ........ **Niven**
- Rune Bertil Nordenstam (1936-) S ........ **B.Nord.**
- Nils Tycho Norlindh (1906-) S ........ **Norl.**

== O ==
- Anna Amelia Obermeyer (1907–2001) P, S ........ **Oberm.**
- Henrik Bernard Oldenland (1663–1697) L ........ **Oldenl.**
- Daniel Oliver (1830–1916) P, S ........ **Oliv.**
- Edward George Hudson Oliver (1938-) S ........ **E.G.H.Oliv.**
- Pehr Osbeck (1723–1805) M, S ........ **Osbeck**

== P ==
- Jorge Americo Rodrigues Paiva (1933-) S ........ **Paiva**
- Max Cilliers Papendorf (1917- ) M ........ **Papendorf**
- George Frederick(Frederik) Papenfuss (1903–1981) A ........ **Papenf.**
- Karl Wilhelm Ludwig Pappe (1803–1862) P, S ........ **Pappe**
- Richard Neville Parker (1884–1958) S ........ **R.Parker**
- William Paterson (1755–1810) S ........ **Paterson**
- Ferdinand Albin Pax (1858–1942) S ........ **Pax**
- Arthur Anselm Pearson (1874–1954) M ........ **A.Pearson**
- Henry Harold Welch Pearson (1870–1916) S ........ **H.Pearson**
- George(Georges Guerrard) Samuel Perrottet (1793–1870) S ........ **Perr.**
- Pauline Lesley Perry (1927- ) S ........ **P.L.Perry**
- Christiaan Hendrik Persoon (1761–1836) A, M, S ........ **Pers.**
- Bo-Hagard Peterson (1918–1990) S ........ **B.Peterson**
- Johann Joseph Peyritsch (1835–1889) M, S ........ **Peyr.**
- Edwin Percy Phillips (1884–1967) S ........ **E.Phillips**
- Marcel Pichon (1921–1954) A, S ........ **Pichon**
- Barendina Jacoba Pienaar (1926-) S ........ **B.J.Pienaar**
- Richard N. Pienaar (1942-) A ........ **Pienaar**
- Gustav Robert Pieper (fl. 1908) S ........ **G.Piep.**
- Neville Stuart Pillans (1884–1964) S ........ **Pillans**
- Jules Emile Planchon (1823–1888) P, S ........ **Planch.**
- Darrel Charles Herbert Plowes (fl. 1986) S ........ **Plowes**
- Edna Pauline Plumstead (1903–1989) F ........**Plumst.**
- Mary Agard Pocock (1886–1977) A ........ **Pocock**
- Eduard Friedrich Poeppig (1798–1868) M, P, S ........ **Poepp.**
- Jean Louis Marie Poiret (1755–1834) A, B, M, P, S ........ **Poir.**
- Illtyd Buller Pole-Evans (1879–1968) M, S ........ **Pole-Evans**
- Roger Marcus Polhill (1937-) S ........ **Polhill**
- Elizabeth Powrie (1925–1977) S ........ **Powrie**
- David Prain (1857–1944) A, P, S ........ **Prain**
- Johann August Ludwig Preiss (1811–1883) S ........ **L.Preiss**
- Richard Chandler Alexander Prior (1809–1902) S ........ **Prior**
- Christian Puff (1949-) S ........ **Puff**
- K.M. Putterill (fl. 1954)(=Mrs Abbott) M ........ **K.M.Putterill**
- V.A. Putterill (fl. 1919) M ........ **V.A.Putterill**

== R ==
- Ludwig Adolph Timotheus Radlkofer (1829–1927) A, M, S ........ **Radlk.**
- Paul Theodor Range (1879–1952) S ........ **Range**
- Werner Rauh (1913-) B, P, S ........ **Rauh**
- Rawson William Rawson (1812–1899) P ........ **Rawson**
- Burkhardt Reber (1848–1926) S ........ **Reber**
- Eduard August von Regel (1815–1892) B, M, P, S ........ **Regel**
- Sigmund Eugen Adolf Rehm (1911-) S ........ **S.E.A.Rehm**
- Anton Rehmann (1840–1917) B, S ........ **Rehmann**
- Caspar Georg Carl Reinwardt (1773–1854) B, P, S ........ **Reinw.**
- Alfred Barton Rendle (1865–1938) A, P, S ........ **Rendle**
- Elizabeth Retief (1947-) S ........ **Retief**
- William Frederick Reyneke (1945-) S ........ **Reyneke**
- Gilbert Westacott Reynolds (1895–1967) S ........ **Reynolds**
- Achille Richard (1794–1852) A, B, M, P, S ........ **A.Rich.**
- Petrus Johannes Robbertse (1932-) S ........ **Robbertse**
- Colin Charles Robertson ( -1946) S ........ **C.Robertson**
- Norman Keith Bonner Robson (1928-) S ........ **N.Robson**
- Frans Hubert Edouard Arthur Walter Robyns (1901–1986) B, S ........ **Robyns**
- Johann Jakob Roemer (1763–1819) P, S ........ **Roem.**
- Frederick Arundel Rogers (1876–1944) S ........ **F.A.Rogers**
- William Moyle Rogers (1835–1920) S ........ **W.M.Rogers**
- Justo P. Rojo (1935-) S ........ **Rojo**
- Robert Allen Rolfe (1855–1921) S ........ **Rolfe**
- James Henderson Ross (1941-) S ........ **J.H.Ross**
- Johan Peter Rottler (1749–1836) S ........ **Rottler**
- Arabella Elizabeth Roupell (1817–1914) S ........ **Roupell**
- John Patrick Rourke (1942-) S ........ **Rourke**
- Jacobus Petrus Roux (1954-) P, S ........ **J.P.Roux**
- William Roxburgh (1751–1815) P, S ........ **Roxb.**
- Hedley Brian Rycroft (1918–1990) S ........ **Rycroft**

== S ==
- Terence Macleane Salter (1883–1969) S ........ **T.M.Salter**
- Henry Frederick Conrad Sander (1847–1920) P, S ........ **Sander**
- John Sanderson (1820~21-1881) S ........ **Sand.**
- Carl Heinrich Schultz (1805–1867) S ........ **Sch.Bip.**
- Hans Conrad Schellenberg (1872–1923) A, M, S ........ **Schellenb.**
- Edmund Andre Charles Lois Eloi Schelpe (1924–1985) B, F, P, S ........ **Schelpe**
- Andreas Franz Wilhelm Schimper (1856–1901) A, B, S ........ **A.Schimp.**
- Wilhelm Philippe Schimper (1808–1880) A, B, F, M, S ........ **Schimp.**
- Hans Schinz (1858–1941) P, S ........ **Schinz**
- Diederich Franz Leonhard von Schlechtendal (1794–1866) M, P, S ........ **Schltdl.**
- Friedrich Richard Rudolf Schlechter (1872–1925) S ........ **Schltr.**
- Hans-Joachim Eberhardt Schlieben (1902–1975) S ........ **Schlieb.**
- Ferdinand Reynold Schoeman (1943-) A ........ **Schoeman**
- Selmar Schonland (1860–1940) S ........ **Schönland**
- Johann Lucas Schonlein (1793–1864) S ........ **Schönl.**
- Carl Joseph Schroter (1855–1939) A, S ........ **Schröt.**
- Josef (Joseph) August Schultes (1773–1831) B, S ........ **Schult.**
- Karl Moritz Schumann (1851–1904) A, B, P, S ........ **K.Schum.**
- Herold Georg Wilhelm Johannes Schweickerdt (1903–1977) S ........ **Schweick.**
- Georg August Schweinfurth (1836–1925) P, S ........ **Schweinf.**
- Charles Leslie Scott (1913–2001) S ........ **C.L.Scott**
- George Francis Scott-Elliot (1862–1934) M, S ........ **Scott-Elliot**
- John Scouler (1804–1871) S ........ **Scouler**
- Stanley Charles Seagrief (1927–1995) A ........ **Seagrief**
- Berthold Carl Seemann (1825–1871) B, P, S ........ **Seem.**
- Karl Otto von Seemen (1838–1910) S ........ **Seemen**
- Homer LeRoy Shantz (1876–1958) A, S ........ **Shantz**
- John Shaw (1837–1890) B ........ **J.Shaw**
- Franz(e) Wilhelm Sieber (1789–1844) B, P ........ **Sieber**
- Thomas Robertson Sim (1856–1938) B, P, S ........ **Sim**
- Richard Harold Simons (1928-) A ........ **Simons**
- John Sims (1749–1831) S ........ **Sims**
- Christo Albertyn Smith (1898–1956) S ........ **C.A.Sm.**
- Gerald Graham Smith (1892–1976) S ........ **G.G.Sm.**
- Jan Christiaan Smuts (1870–1950) S ........ **Smuts**
- Thomas Robert Soderstrom (1936–1987) S ........ **Soderstr.**
- Daniel Carl Solander (1733–1782) A, S ........ **Sol.**
- Hans Solereder (1860–1920) S ........ **Soler.**
- Otto Wilhelm Sonder (1812–1881) A, B, S ........ **Sond.**
- Pierre Sonnerat (1748–1814) S ........ **Sonn.**
- Édouard Spach (1801–1879) P, S ........ **Spach**
- Anders Sparrman (1748–1820) S ........ **Sparrm.**
- Curt Polycarp Joachim Sprengel (1766–1833) A, B, M, P, S ........ **Spreng.**
- William Stanger (1811–1854) S ........ **Stanger**
- Otto Stapf (1857–1933) B, S ........ **Stapf**
- Hans Ulrich Stauffer (1929–1965) S ........ **Stauffer**
- Sydney Margaret Stent (1875–1942) S ........ **Stent**
- Edith Layard Stephens (1884–1966) A, M, S ........ **Stephens**
- Ernst Gottlieb von Steudel (1783–1856) A, B, M, P, S ........ **Steud.**
- Joyce L. Stewart (née Tucker)(1936-) S ........ **J.L.Stewart**
- Charles Howard Stirton (1946-) S ........ **C.H.Stirt.**
- Bertha M. Stoneman (1866–1943) M ........ **Stoneman**
- Robert Story (1913–1999) S ........ **Story**
- Rudolf Georg Strey (1907–1988) S ........ **Strey**
- Per Arne Krister Strid (1943-) S ........ **Strid**
- Haring Johannes Swart (`Harry') (1922–1993) M ........ **H.J.Swart**
- Robert Sweet (1783–1835) P, S ........ **Sweet**
- Charles Francis Massey Swynnerton (1877–1938) S ........ **Swynn.**
- Ignaz von Szyszylowicz (1857–1910) B, P, S ........ **Szyszyl**[Polish l].

== T ==
- Patrick Henry Brabazon Talbot (1919–1979) M ........ **P.H.B.Talbot**
- Jiro Tanaka (1950-) A ........ **Ji.Tanaka**
- Paul Hermann Wilhelm Taubert (1862–1897) P, S ........ **Taub.**
- George Taylor (1904–1993) S ........ **G.Taylor**
- William Randolph Taylor (1895–1990) A ........ **W.R.Taylor**
- Johannes Jacobus Theron (1905-) S ........ **Theron**
- David Thoday (1883–1964) S ........ **Thoday**
- (Hans) Justus Thode (1859–1932) S ........ **Thode**
- Mary Fraser Thompson (=Mrs Rand)(1941–1982) S ........ **M.F.Thomps.**
- Peter Thonning (1775–1848) S ........ **Thonn.**
- Abel Aubert du Petit-Thouars (1793–1864) S ........ **A.Thouars**
- Louis-Marie Aubert du Petit-Thouars (1758–1831) P, S ........ **Thouars**
- Carl Peter Thunberg (1743–1828) A, B, M, P, S ........ **Thunb.**
- Helmut Richard Toelken (1939-) S ........ **Toelken**
- Antonio Rocha da Torre (1904-) S ........ **Torre**
- Hamilton Paul Traub (1890–1983) S ........ **Traub**
- Jose Jeronimo Triana (1834–1890) P, S ........ **Triana**
- Wilhelm Triebner (1883–1957) S ........ **Triebner**
- Roland Trimen (1840–1916) S ........ **R.Trimen**
- Georges M.D.J. Troupin (1923-) S ........ **Troupin**
- Louis René Tulasne (1815–1885) M, S ........ **Tul.**
- Billie Lee Turner (1925-) S ........ **B.L.Turner**
- William Bertram Turrill (1890–1961) S ........ **Turrill**
- William Tyson (1851–1920) A ........ **Tyson**

== U ==
- Noel Rosa Urton (née Bryant)(fl. 1986) S ........ **Urton**

== V ==
- Martin (Henrichsen) Vahl (1749–1804) A, B, M, P, S ........ **Vahl**
- Paul Andries Van der Byl (1888–1939) M ........ **Van der Byl**
- Frederick Ziervogel Van der Merwe (1894–1968) S ........ **Van der Merwe**
- Jacoba Johanna Maria Van der Merwe (1946-) S ........ **J.J.M.van der Merwe**
- Johannes Jacobus Adriaan Van der Walt (1938-) S ........ **J.J.A.van der Walt**
- Gideon Christiaan Albertus Van der Westhuizen (fl. 1956) M ........ **Van der Westh.**
- Ernst Jacobus van Jaarsveld (1953-) S ........ **Van Jaarsv.**
- Abraham Erasmus van Wyk (1952-) S ........ **A.E.van Wyk**
- Georg Carl Wilhelm Vatke (1849–1889) S ........ **Vatke**
- Jose Mariano da Conceicao Vellozo (1742–1811) P, S ........ **Vell.**
- Etienne Pierre Ventenat (1757–1808) M, P, S ........ **Vent.**
- Hendrik Johannes Tjaart Venter (1938-) S ........ **Venter**
- S. Venter (fl. 1988) S ........ **S.Venter**
- Bernard Verdcourt (1925-) P, S ........ **Verdc.**
- Frans Verdoorn (1906–1984) B, P, S ........ **Verd.**
- Inez Clare Verdoorn (1896–1989) S ........ **I.Verd.**
- Len Verwoerd (fl. 1924) M ........ **Verwoerd**
- Eugène Vieillard (1819–1896) P, S ........ **Vieill.**
- L.G.Alexandre Viguier (1790–1867) S ........ **Vig.**
- Otto Heinrich Volk (1903-) B, S ........ **O.H.Volk**
- Kaj Borge Vollesen (1946-) S ........ **Vollesen**
- Pieter Johannes Vorster (1945-) P, S ........ **Vorster**

== W ==
- Horace Athelstan Wager (1876–1951) B ........ **Wager**
- Vincent Athelstan Wager (1904-) M, S ........ **V.A.Wager**
- Johann August Wahlberg (1810–1856) S ........ **J.Wahlb.**
- Marion Meason Walgate (=Mrs McNae)(1914-) S ........ **Walgate**
- Nathaniel Wallich (olim Nathan Wolff)(1786–1854) P, S ........ **Wall.**
- Wilhelm Gerhard Walpers (1816–1853) S ........ **Walp.**
- Heinrich (Karl) Walter (1898-) S ........ **H.K.Walter**
- Otto Warburg (1859–1938) P, S ........ **Warb.**
- Alma May Waterman (1893-) M ........ **Waterman**
- William Watson (1858–1925) S ........ **W.Watson**
- John Mitchell Watt (1892–1980) S ........ **J.M.Watt**
- Heinrich Wawra (1831–1887) P, S ........ **Wawra**
- Anna Weber-Van Bosse (née van Bosse)(1852–1942) S ........ **A.A.Weber-van Bosse**
- Hugh Algernon Weddell (1819–1877) M, S ........ **Wedd.**
- August Henning Weimarck (1903–1980) S ........ **Weim.**
- Henry Welsh (1906–1967) A ........ **Welsh**
- Friedrich Martin Josef Welwitsch (1806–1872) M, P, S ........ **Welw.**
- Erich Werdermann (1892–1959) M, S ........ **Werderm.**
- Fritz (Friedrich) Wettstein (1895–1945) A, B, M, P, S ........ **F.Wettst.**
- Louis Cutter Wheeler (1910–1980) S ........ **L.C.Wheeler**
- Frank White (1927-) S ........ **F.White**
- Gerald Ernest Wickens (1927-) S ........ **Wickens**
- Delbert Wiens (1932-) S ........ **Wiens**
- Robert Wight (1796–1872) S ........ **Wight**
- Ernst Wilczek (1867–1948) M, P, S ........ **Wilczek**
- Hiram Wild (1917–1982) S ........ **Wild**
- Carl Ludwig von Willdenow (1765–1812) A, M, P, S ........ **Willd.**
- Ion James Muirhead Williams (1912-) S ........ **I.Williams**
- Friedrich Wilms (1848–1919) B, S ........ **F.Wilms**
- Ernest Henry Wilson (1876–1930) S ........ **E.H.Wilson**
- Eduard Winkler (1799-) S ........ **Winkl.**
- Anthony Hurt Wolley-Dod (1861–1948) S ........ **Wolley-Dod**
- John Medley Wood (1827–1915) S ........ **J.M.Wood**
- Wilson Crosfield Worsdell (1867–1957) S ........ **Worsd.**
- Charles Wright (1811–1885) P, S ........ **C.Wright**
- Charles Henry Wright (1864–1941) A, P, S ........ **C.H.Wright**
- William Wright (1735–1819) S ........ **W.Wright**
- Andrew Wyley (1820-) S ........ **Wyley**
- Ben-Erik van Wyk (1956) A ........ **B.E.Wyk**

== Y ==
- Ralph George Norwood Young (1904–1979) S ........ **R.G.N.Young**

== Z ==
- Alexander Zahlbruckner (1860–1938) M, S ........ **Zahlbr.**
- Carl Ludwig Philipp Zeyher (1799–1858) S ........ **Zeyh.**
- Eduard Meine van Zinderen-Bakker (1907–2002) B, M ........ **Zind.-Bakker**

== See also ==
- List of botanists by author abbreviation
- International Code of Nomenclature for algae, fungi, and plants
