= Maesobotrya barteri var. sparsiflora =

Scientific classification
- Kingdom: Plantae
- Clade: Tracheophytes
- Clade: Angiosperms
- Clade: Eudicots
- Clade: Rosids
- Order: Malpighiales
- Family: Phyllanthaceae
- Genus: Maesobotrya
- Species: M. barteri
- Variety: M. b. var. sparsiflora

Trinomial name
- Maesobotrya barteri var. sparsiflora (Scott-Elliot) Keay

Synonyms
- Maesobotrya edulis Hutch. & Dalziel

Variety of flowering plant

Maesobotrya barteri var. sparsiflora is a variety of flowering plant belonging to the family Phyllanthaceae, or by some authors classified in Euphorbiaceae sensu lato, native to Côte d'Ivoire. Its fruits are edible and known as "apotrewa".
