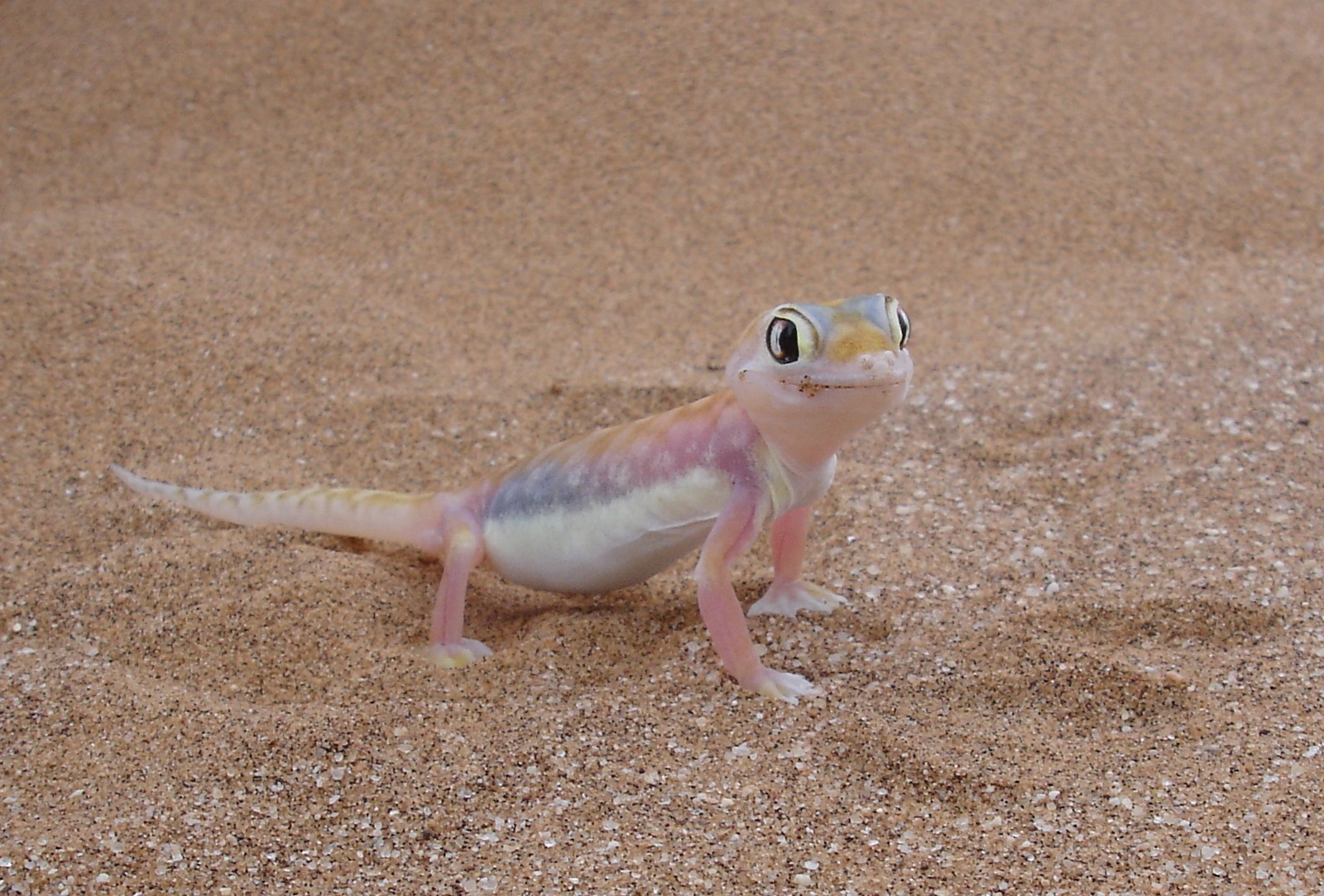
- Namib web-footed gecko
- Biofluorescence in Pachydactylus rangei

Conservation status
- Least Concern (IUCN 3.1)

Scientific classification
- Kingdom: Animalia
- Phylum: Chordata
- Class: Reptilia
- Order: Squamata
- Suborder: Gekkota
- Family: Gekkonidae
- Genus: Pachydactylus
- Species: P. rangei

Binomial name
- Pachydactylus rangei Andersson, 1908

Synonyms
- Palmatogecko rangei Anderson, 1908; Syndactylosaura schultzei F. Werner, 1910; Palmatogecko rangei — Loveridge, 1947; Pachydactylus rangei — Bauer & Lamb, 2005

= Pachydactylus rangei =

Species of lizard

Pachydactylus rangei, the Namib sand gecko or Namib web-footed gecko, is a species of small lizard in the family Gekkonidae. It inhabits the arid areas of Angola, Namibia, and South Africa, and was first described in 1908 by Swedish zoologist Lars Gabriel Andersson, who named it after its finder, German geologist Dr. Paul Range.

== Description ==
Pachydactylus rangei grows to a length of about 13 cm (5 in) including a 6-centimetre (2.4 in) tail. The head is quite distinct from the slender body and both are dorsally flattened. The eyes are large, dark-colored, protuberant, and have vertical pupils. The web-footed gecko is very pale, nearly translucent. The skin has a salmon-colored undertone, and some individuals display light brown stripes or patterns. The coloration allows for excellent camouflage in its desert habitat. The skin is covered in fine, smooth scales and is translucent; some internal organs can be seen through it. The legs are thin but the feet are broad, with fully webbed toes, enabling the gecko to burrow easily and to run on loose sand. Their feet also have adhesive toe pads to help with climbing. Like many reptiles, Pachydactylus rangei displays a degree of sexual dimorphism. The males have thicker tails than the females. The female's mass can reach around 10 grams (0.35 oz) while the male is smaller, about 6 grams (0.21 oz). This species is somewhat similar in appearance to Ptenopus garrulus, another species of gecko found within its range.

== Habitat ==
Pachydactylus rangei is endemic to the Namib Desert of southwestern Africa, where it is found near the coast and up to 130 kilometres (80 miles) inland at altitudes of up to 300 metres (1,000 feet). The type locality is Lüderitz in Namibia. Its habitat is among rocks and stunted vegetation and on the dry loose sand of sand dunes. The geckos prefer the sandy desert regions and are only found on the coastal part of Namibia and the Richtersveld in the extreme north of Namaqualand in the Cape.

== Diet ==
The geckos manly predate on small arthropods. The gecko's large eyes are adapted to facilitate nocturnal hunting.

== Behavior ==
Pachydactylus rangei is nocturnal, spending the day in a burrow up to a meter deep. It emerges at night to feed on arthropods such as termites, ants, beetles, grasshoppers and spiders. Its main source of water is condensation found on vegetation. It can also absorb moisture through its skin. They communicate using a wide range of vocalizations, including squeaks, clicks and even croaks.

Individuals are ordinarily solitary. Reproduction takes place in April and May. During copulation, the male grasps the female tightly while gripping her neck with his teeth and bends his tail round under hers. The female lays one or two oval, hard-shelled eggs and buries them in moist sand where they incubate at a temperature of about 30 °C (86 °F). The young geckos hatch after about eight weeks and are already 10 cm (4 in) long. They start eating after about four days.

== Conservation status and threats ==
Pachydactylus rangei is considered to be of a species of least concern by the IUCN as of 2020. There is limited pressure from the pet trade, but human impact on the species is assessed to be marginal. It is abundant in several protected areas across its range.
