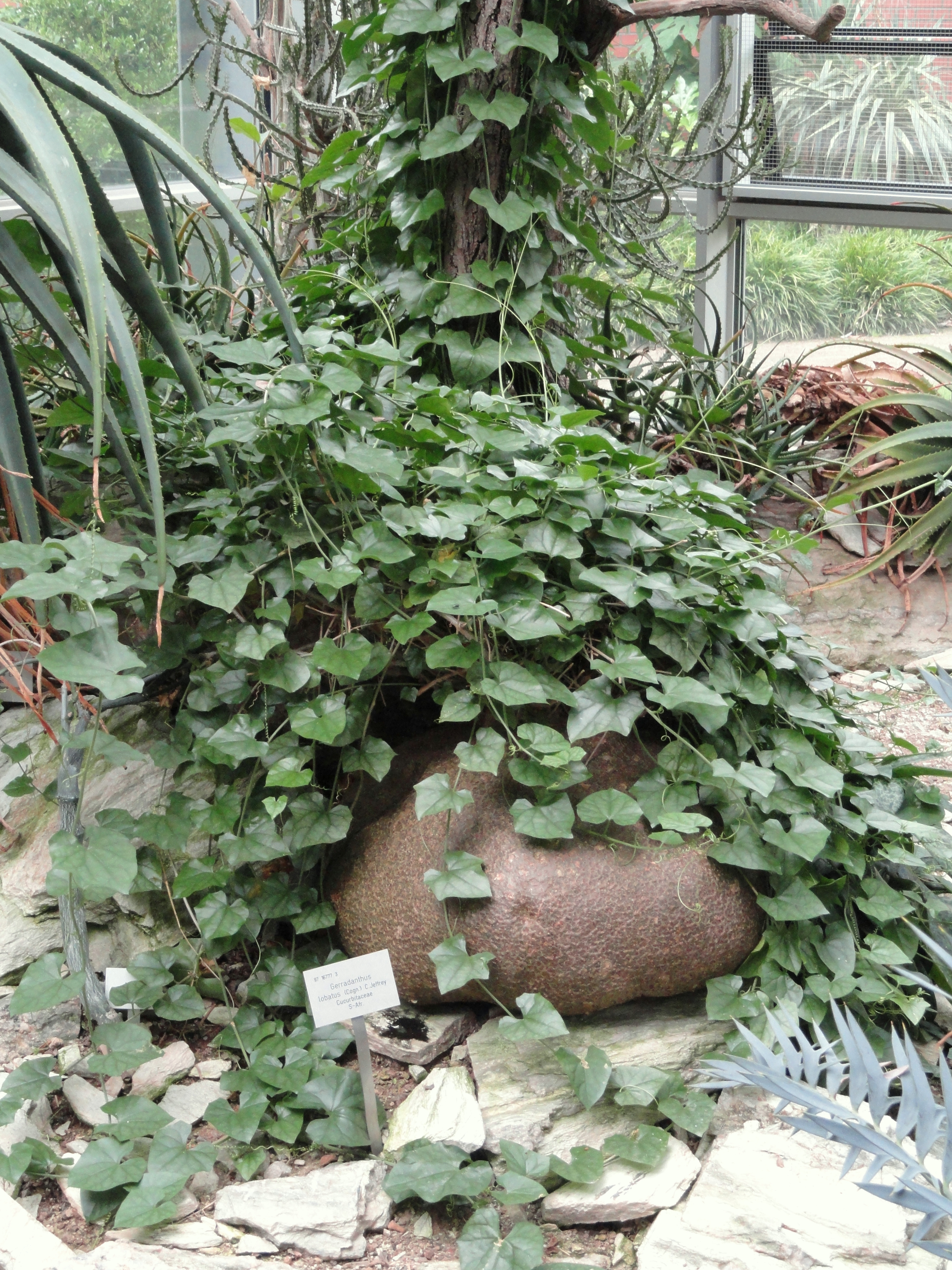

Scientific classification
- Kingdom: Plantae
- Clade: Tracheophytes
- Clade: Angiosperms
- Clade: Eudicots
- Clade: Rosids
- Order: Cucurbitales
- Family: Cucurbitaceae
- Genus: Gerrardanthus
- Species: G. lobatus

Binomial name
- Gerrardanthus lobatus (Cogn.) C.Jeffrey

Synonyms
- Gerrardanthus grandiflorus var. lobatus Cogn.

= Gerrardanthus lobatus =

Species of flowering plant

Gerrardanthus lobatus is a species of plant native to eastern and southern Africa. It is a popular pot plant that grows in deciduous bushland, woodland, wooded grassland in rocky places, and also in hygrophilous and riverine forests and clearings.
