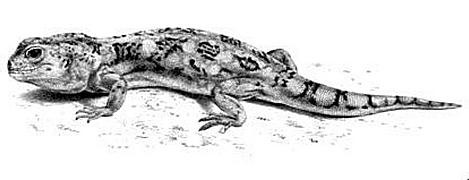
- P. garrulus maculatus
- Barking gecko calls recorded in Namibia

Scientific classification
- Kingdom: Animalia
- Phylum: Chordata
- Class: Reptilia
- Order: Squamata
- Suborder: Gekkota
- Family: Gekkonidae
- Subfamily: Uroplatinae
- Genus: Ptenopus; Gray, 1866

= Ptenopus =

Genus of lizards

Ptenopus is a small genus of lizards, known commonly as barking geckos, in the family Gekkonidae. The genus is endemic to southern Africa. There are only three described species in this genus.

== Species and subspecies ==
The following species and subspecies are recognized as being valid.

- Ptenopus carpi Brain, 1962 – Carp's barking gecko, Namib chirping gecko
- Ptenopus garrulus (A. Smith, 1849) – common barking gecko, whistling gecko
  - Ptenopus garrulus garrulus (A. Smith, 1849)
  - Ptenopus garrulus maculatus Gray, 1866
- Ptenopus kochi Haacke, 1964 – interdune barking gecko, Koch's barking gecko, Koch's chirping gecko

Nota bene: A binomial authority or a trinomial authority in parentheses indicates that the species or subspecies was originally described in a genus other than Ptenopus.

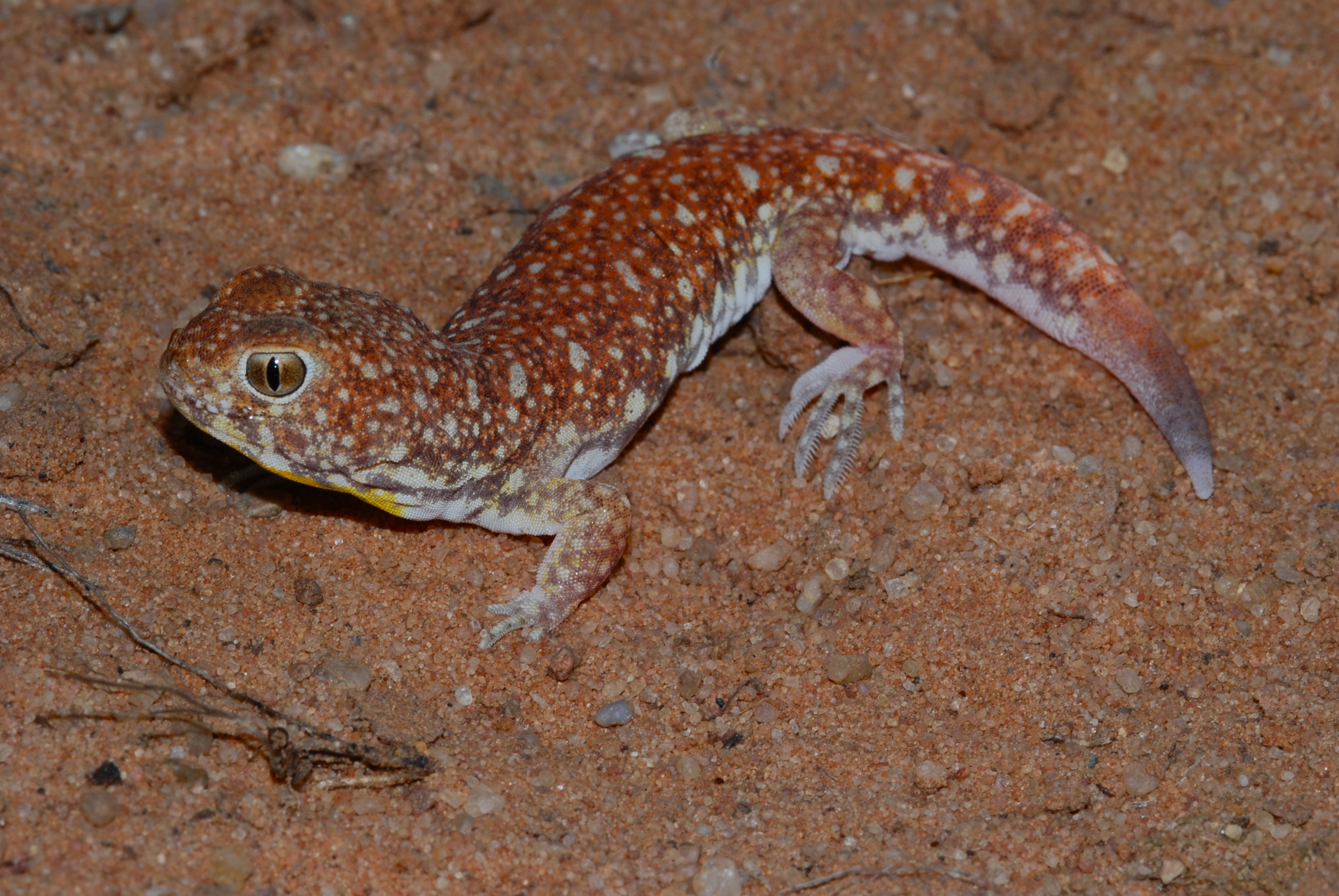
Common barking gecko, P. garrulus. Note the fringed toes and the regenerated tip to the tail.

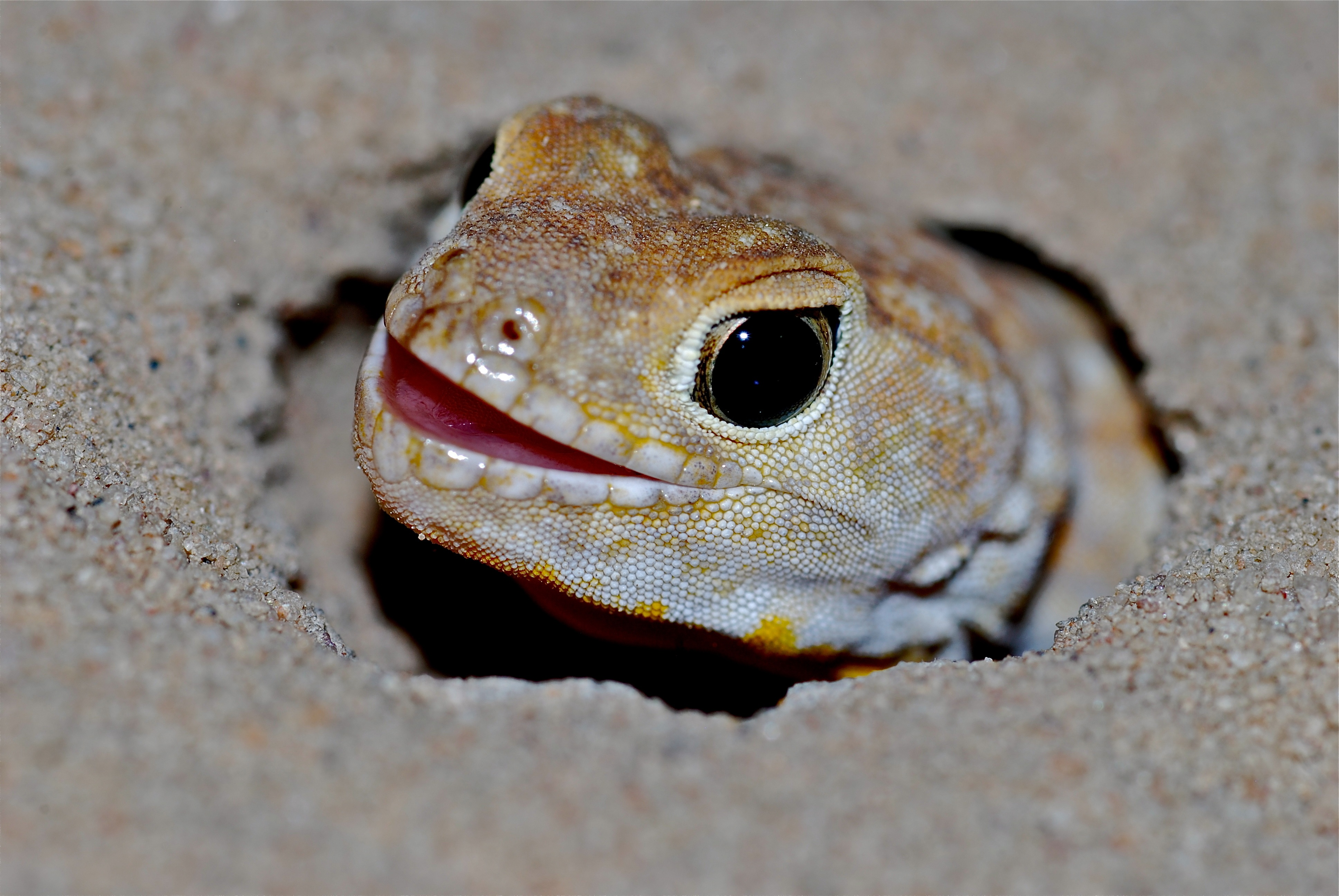
P. garrulus, barking

== Description ==
The genus Ptenopus is in several ways atypical of the family Gekkonidae. The toes have neither pads nor expanded tips; instead they have well-developed claws and they are fringed with comb-like scales that assist in rapid motion over sand, and perhaps in digging.
The name Ptenopus is from classical Greek and means "feather-foot", referring to the fringes on the toes.

In build the body and tail are only moderately plump, roughly cylindrical without special frills. The tail tapers to a point, but as is common among geckos, it commonly has been partly shed by the time the animal is fully grown, and the distal part commonly is a regenerated replacement. The animal is of modest size for a gecko, typically 50–60 mm (2.0–2.4 in) in body length. The head plus tail add about a similar length, so that a typical specimen might measure roughly 100–120 mm (3.9–4.7 in) in total length. As in most geckos, the tail commonly is swollen with fat stores, but not as much so as most species, such as say, in the genera Chondrodactylus and Pachydactylus.

The profile of the head is blunt, the snout being rounded, reminiscent of the genera Chondrodactylus and Pachydactylus. The eyes are prominent and wide-set, sited distinctly far forward over the short muzzle, and they have vertical pupils without the pinholes to be seen in, for example, the pupils of many species of Pachydactylus. The body and tail are cylindrical and the tail tapers to a point. The scales are small and granular and have no keels. The colour ranges from off-white or mottled yellow to chestnut brown, with irregular blotches and speckles. The ventral scales are generally white, but males of all species and females of Ptenopus carpi have yellow throats.

== Biology ==
Barking geckos dig burrows up to a metre long. During the day they plug their burrows for protection from heat and predators. The name "barking gecko" refers to the territorial calls of males. During summer males sit at the mouths of their burrows in the dusk and on overcast days, and with only their heads showing, they call "kek-kek-kek" for hours on end. The call of each of the species has its own characteristic pitch. Apart from territorial defence, the calls attract females. A female that has chosen a mate will enter his burrow, and after mating she takes it over. He leaves and digs himself a new burrow. Usually she lays a single egg in such a burrow and leaves soon after. As is typical of geckos, the egg is hard-shelled.

Because of the importance of their burrows in their biology, barking geckos can only live in areas where they can dig their burrows. They depend on sand or silt that is fine enough, and firm enough to dig. Dunes of loose sand will not do, and neither will hard nor stony ground, nor thick grass. They prefer sparsely vegetated sandy soil, or silt in dry riverbeds. In suitable spots, they sometimes congregate densely, with many burrows in a small area. However solitary burrows are not unusual.

At night after rain showers, such as in the weather in which termites undertake their nuptial flights, barking geckos commonly leave their burrows to hunt actively for prey. During the brief season when the termites take to flight, they form an important part of the geckos' nutrition. At other times of the year, the geckos are mainly ambush predators, awaiting prey at the burrow entrance and sallying forth opportunistically.

== Geographic range ==
Barking geckos are endemic to the arid western parts of Southern Africa.
Ptenopus garrulus has the largest geographic range, from Northern Cape, most of southern Namibia, and the southern half of Botswana, to northwest Limpopo.
Ptenopus carpi occurs only in the Namib Desert from the Kuiseb River northwards to about opposite Etosha.
Ptenopus kochi occurs between the Kuiseb River southwards to Lüderitz.
