= William Tyrer Gerrard =

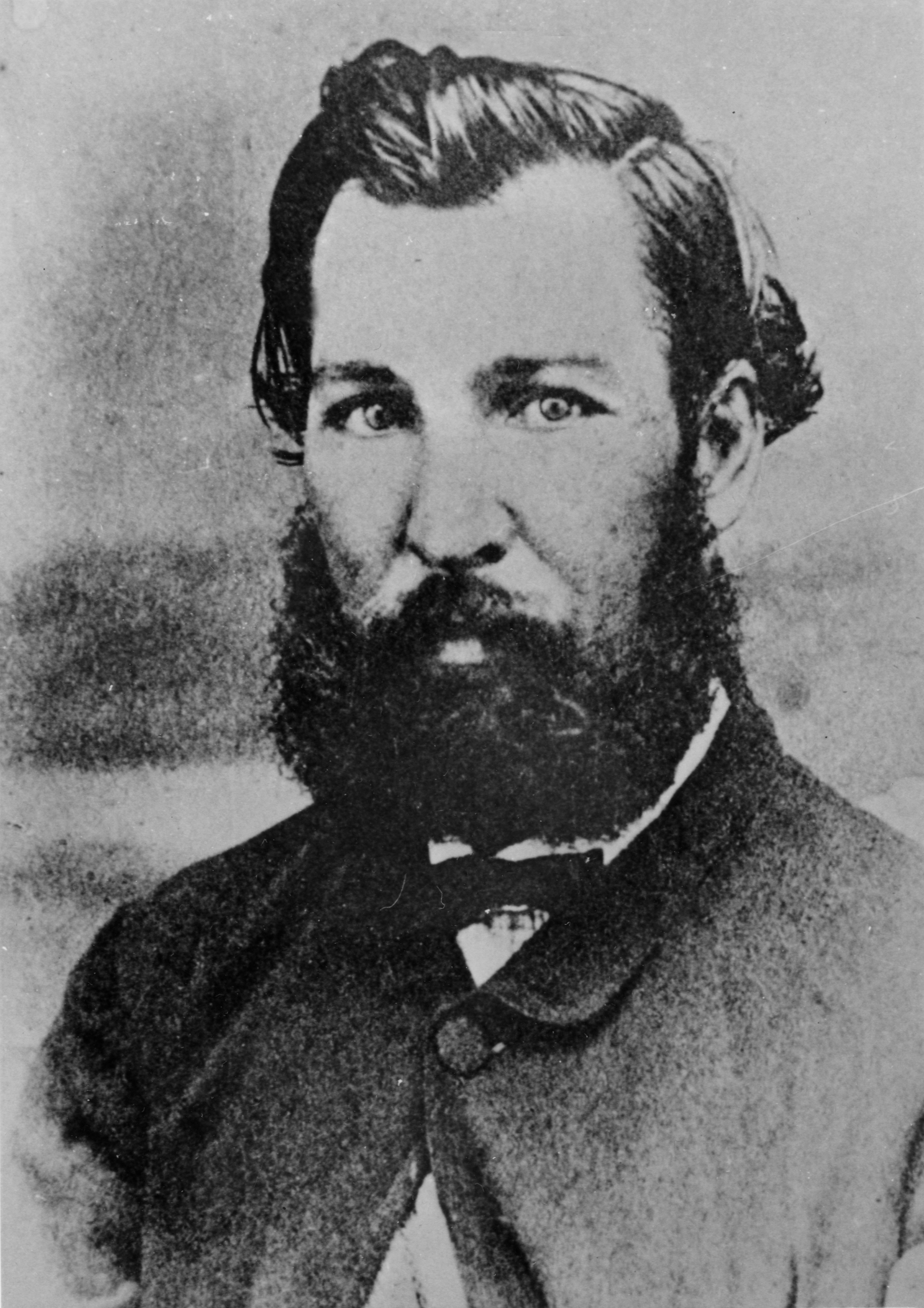

William Tyrer Gerrard (1831 – 9 July 1866) was an English botanical collector in Natal and Madagascar in the 1860s. The genus Gerrardanthus is named in his honor.

Gerrard was born in Knowsley, Merseyside, England. He was active as a botanical collector in Australia and then Natal, where he first collected several genera and over 150 previously unknown species, and from which he sent a stuffed aardvark to the Free Public Library, Derby Museum. He left Natal in April 1865 for coastal Madagascar, where he made large collections of plants, insects, and birds, before succumbing to illness. He last bequest of specimens to Derby Museum in Liverpool was in 1867. He died at age 34 of yellow fever in July 1866, in Foulepointe (now Mahavelona), Madagascar. The standard author abbreviation Gerrard is used to indicate this person as the author when citing a botanical name.

== See also ==
- List of South African plant botanical authors
