= Namib chirping gecko =

Conservation status
- Least Concern (IUCN 3.1)

Scientific classification
- Kingdom: Animalia
- Phylum: Chordata
- Class: Reptilia
- Order: Squamata
- Suborder: Gekkota
- Family: Gekkonidae
- Genus: Ptenopus
- Species: P. carpi

Binomial name
- Ptenopus carpi Brain, 1962

Species of lizard

The Namib chirping gecko (Ptenopus carpi), also known commonly as Carp's barking gecko, is a species of lizard in the family Gekkonidae. The species is endemic to Namibia.

== Etymology ==
The specific name, carpi, is in honor of South African amateur naturalist Bernhard Carp (1901–1966), who was a financial supporter of museum expeditions.

== Habitat ==
The preferred natural habitat of P. carpi is desert, at altitudes from sea level to 300 m (980 ft).

== Description ==
Adults of P. carpi usually have a snout-to-vent length (SVL) of 5.0–5.5 centimetres (2.0–2.2 in). The maximum recorded SVL is 5.9 cm (2.3 in). Dorsally, it has 3–5 dark brown crossbars on the body, and 5-9 more on the tail. Ventrally, it is white. A yellow heart-shaped spot may be present on the throat.

== Behavior ==
P. carpi is nocturnal and digs burrows. It shelters in these burrows during the day.

== Vocalization ==
Males of P. carpi make barking or chirping sounds to attract females.

== Reproduction ==
P. carpi is oviparous.
