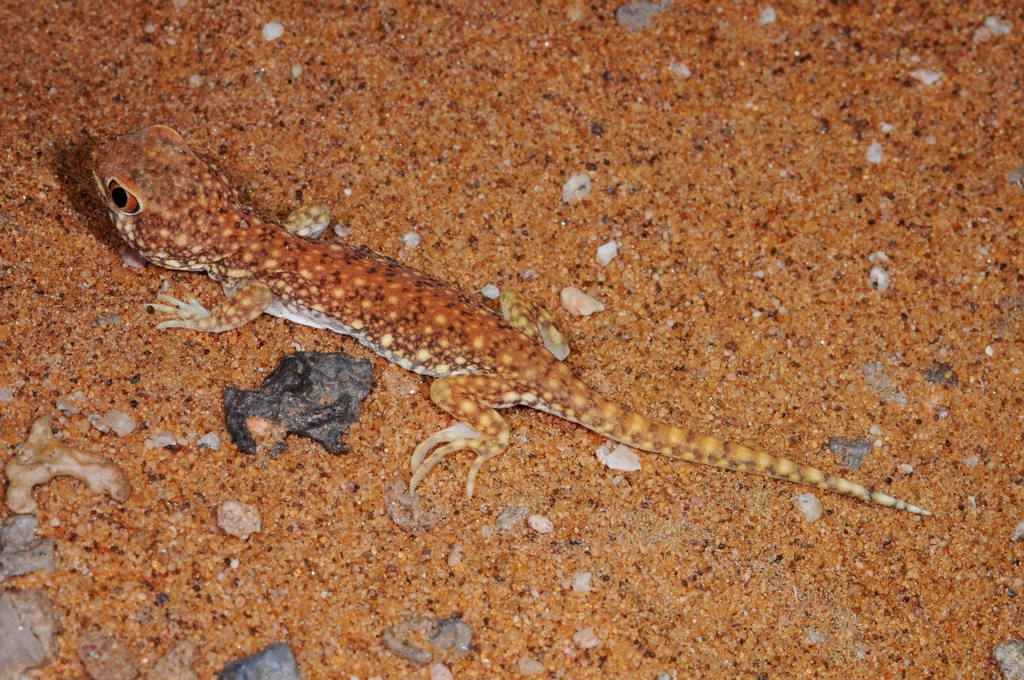

Conservation status
- Least Concern (IUCN 3.1)

Scientific classification
- Kingdom: Animalia
- Phylum: Chordata
- Class: Reptilia
- Order: Squamata
- Suborder: Gekkota
- Family: Gekkonidae
- Genus: Ptenopus
- Species: P. kochi

Binomial name
- Ptenopus kochi Haacke, 1964

= Ptenopus kochi =

Species of lizard

Ptenopus kochi, also known commonly as the interdune barking gecko, Koch's barking gecko, and Koch's chirping gecko, is a species of lizard in the family Gekkonidae. The species is endemic to Namibia.

== Etymology ==
The specific name, kochi, is in honor of Austrian-born South African entomologist Charles Koch.

== Description ==
Adults of P. kochi usually have a snout-to-vent length (SVL) of 5–6 cm (2.0–2.4 in). Its large bulging eyes and swollen nostrils give it a frog-like appearance. The body scales are very small and numerous, arranged in 187–222 rows around the body at midbody. The tail length is slightly shorter than SVL. The toes of all four feet have lateral fringes of elongate pointed scales. Dorsally, P. kochi is reddish brown, with light spots and dark speckles. Ventrally, it is whitish. The throat and labials of males are yellow.

== Habitat ==
The preferred natural habitat of P. kochi is sandy desert, at altitudes of 50–500 m (160–1,640 ft).

== Behavior ==
P. kochi is terrestrial and crepuscular. It digs burrows as long as 90 cm (35 in) and as deep as 40 cm (16 in). During the summer breeding season, males vocalize from burrow entrances around sunset to attract females and establish territory.

== Reproduction ==
P. kochi is oviparous.
