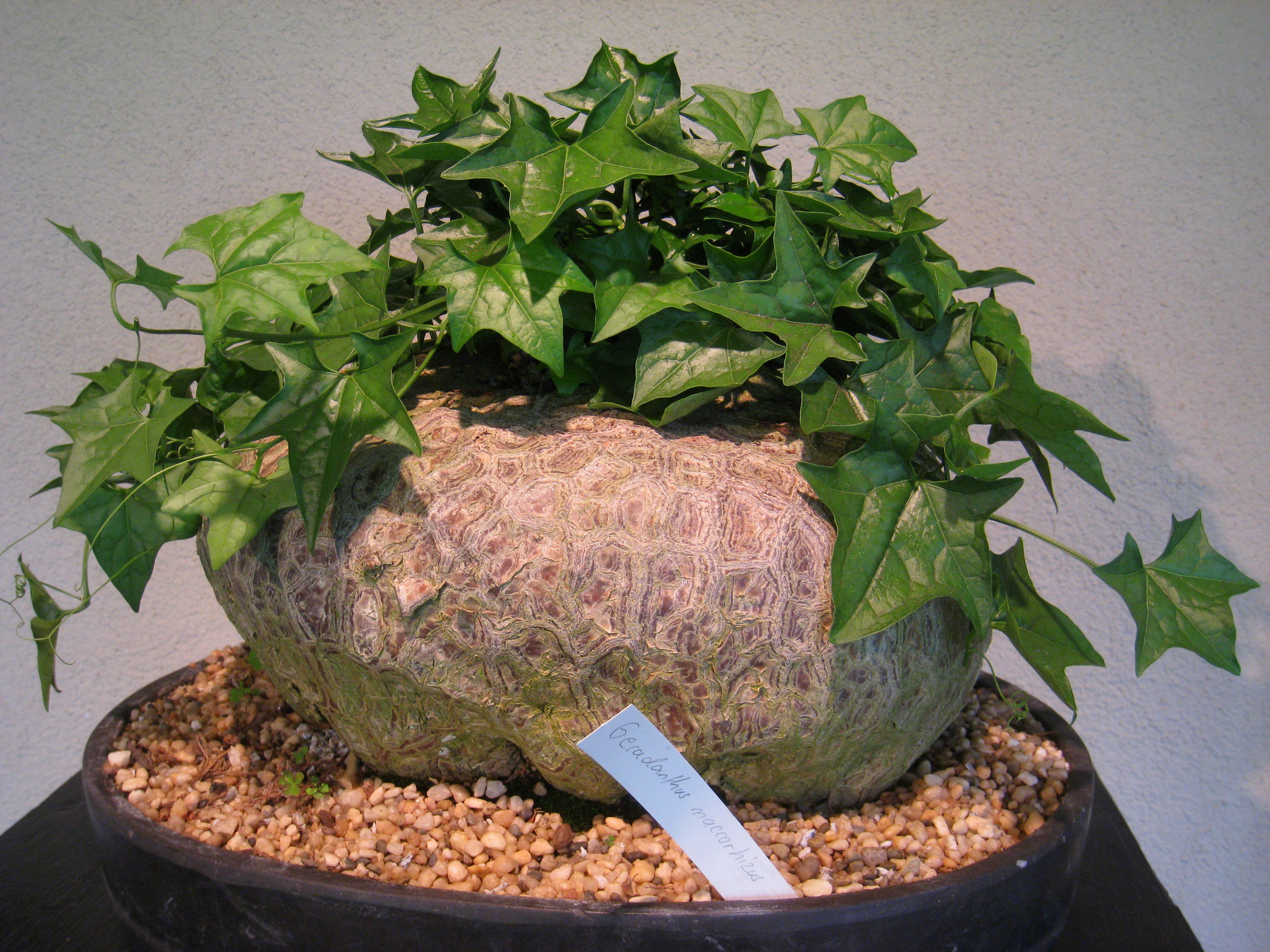

Scientific classification
- Kingdom: Plantae
- Clade: Tracheophytes
- Clade: Angiosperms
- Clade: Eudicots
- Clade: Rosids
- Order: Cucurbitales
- Family: Cucurbitaceae
- Genus: Gerrardanthus
- Species: G. macrorhizus

Binomial name
- Gerrardanthus macrorhizus Harv. ex Benth. & Hook.f.

= Gerrardanthus macrorhizus =

Species of flowering plant

Gerrardanthus macrorhizus, also known as bigfoot, is a species of plant native to southern Africa. It is a popular pot plant.
