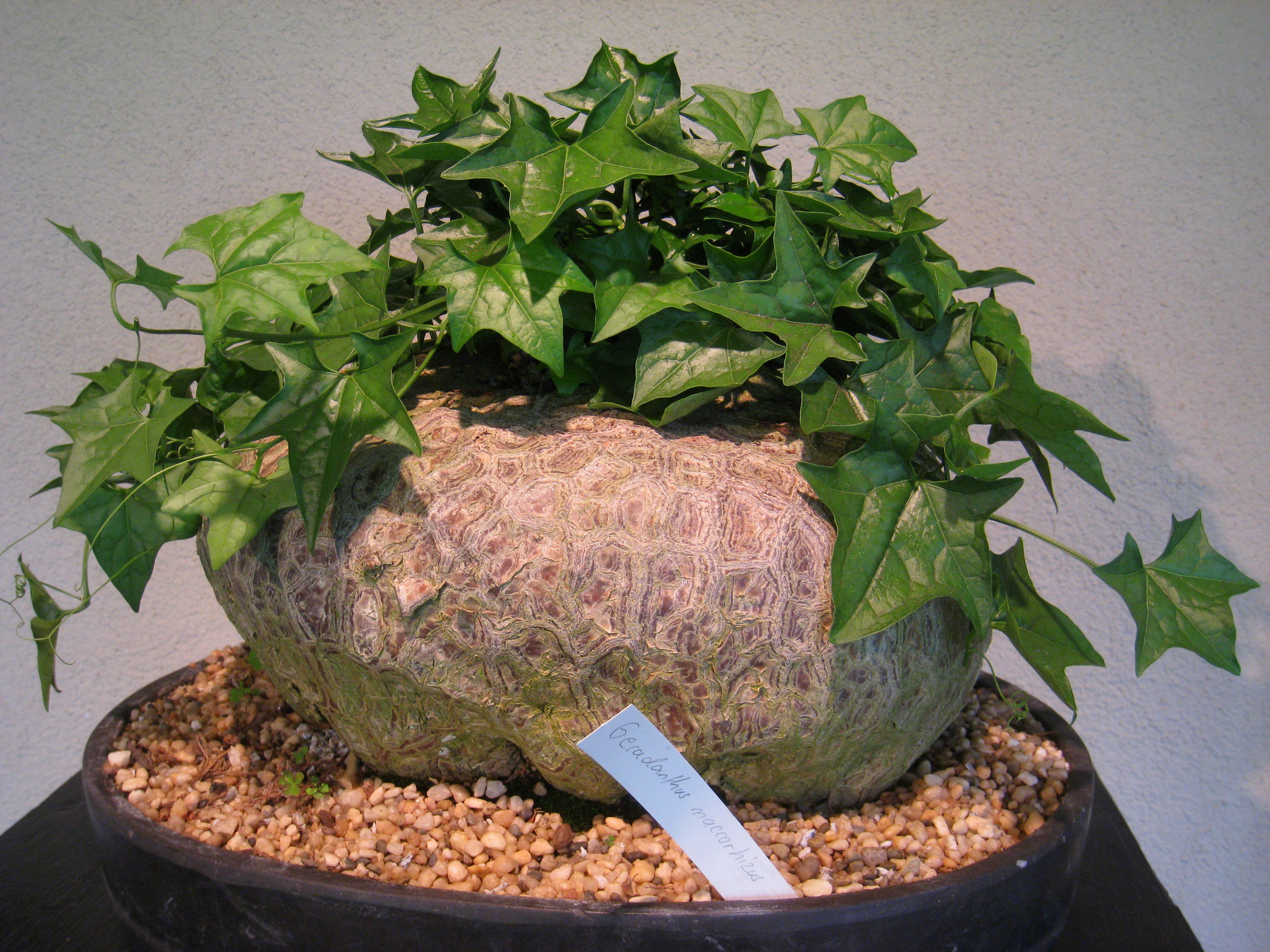
- Gerrardanthus macrorhizus.

Scientific classification
- Kingdom: Plantae
- Clade: Embryophytes
- Clade: Tracheophytes
- Clade: Angiosperms
- Clade: Eudicots
- Clade: Rosids
- Order: Cucurbitales
- Family: Cucurbitaceae
- Tribe: Zanonieae
- Genus: Gerrardanthus; Harv. ex Benth. & Hook.f.

Species
- See text

Synonyms
- Atheranthera Mast.

= Gerrardanthus =

Genus of flowering plants

Gerrardanthus is a genus of flowering plants native to tropical Africa and South Africa, first described by William Henry Harvey (1811–1866), and named in honor of William Tyrer Gerrard (died 1866 in Mahavelona, Madagascar), botanical collector in Natal and Madagascar in the 1860s.

Gerrardanthus is a perennial climber, with height up to 5 m, rising from a swollen, tuberous base with a thickness of up to 1.5 m. Stems are herbaceous but becoming woody and grey-barked as they age.

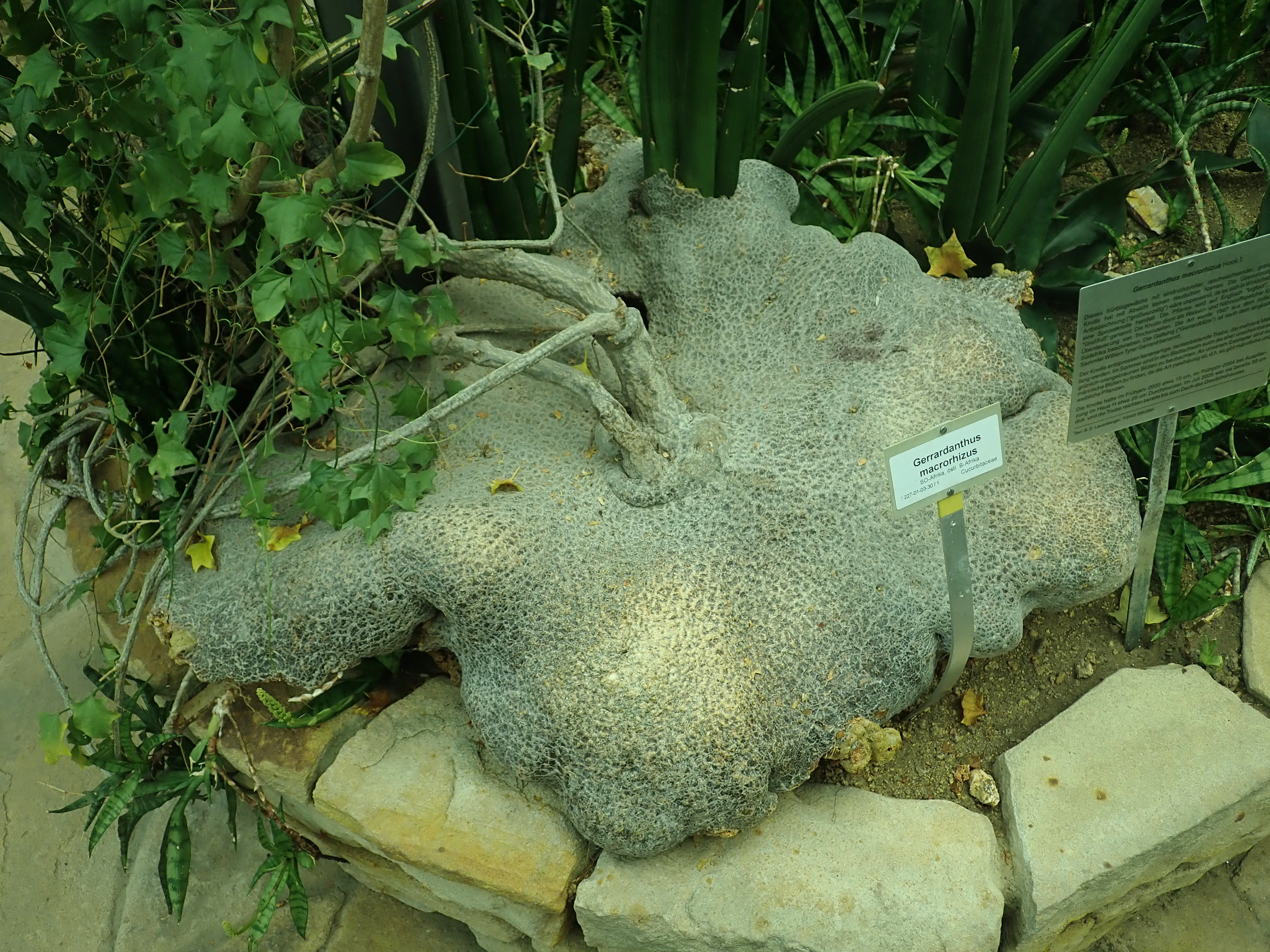
Gerrardanthus macrorhizus with caudex

== Species ==
- Gerrardanthus aethiopicus
- Gerrardanthus grandiflorus
- Gerrardanthus lobatus
- Gerrardanthus macrorhizus
- Gerrardanthus nigericus
- Gerrardanthus paniculatus
- Gerrardanthus parviflorus
- Gerrardanthus portentosus
- Gerrardanthus tomentosus
- Gerrardanthus trimenii
- Gerrardanthus zenkeri
