= Josef Brunnthaler =

Austrian botanist (1871–1914)

Josef Brunnthaler (20 December 1871, in Vienna – 18 August 1914) was an Austrian botanist, known for his work in the field of phycology.

== Career ==
Up until 1904 Brunnthaler was an employee of the Viennese banking and exchange establishment (Voelcker & Co.) — as a botanist he was self-taught. From 1895 he served as librarian of the Zoologisch-Botanischen Gesellschaft (Zoological-Botanical Society in Vienna), and in 1897 he founded the Kryptogamen-Tauschanstalt (Cryptogamic exchange institution). In 1905 at Schönbrunn, he organized a botanical exhibition that was associated with the International Congress of Botanists. In 1908 he was named as a curator of the botanical institute at the University of Vienna.

In 1909 he embarked on a scientific expedition to German East Africa, Cape Colony and Natal, from which he collected valuable specimens. In 1911 he participated on a journey to Dalmatia.

== Death ==
During the following year he succumbed to illness and died two years later at the age of 42.

Brunnthaler specialized in research of fresh water algae. The algae species, Ulothrix brunnthaleri and Characium brunnthaleri are named after him.

== Publications ==
- Die Algen und Schizophyceen der altwässer der Donau bei Wien, 1908 – Algae and Schizophyceae at the oxbow of the Danube near Vienna.
- Vegetationsbilder aus Südafrika (Karroo und Dornbusch), 1911 (in: Karsten and Schenck's Vegetationsbilder) – Botanical images from South Africa: Karoo and Dornbusch.
- Ergebnisse einer botanischen Forschungsreise nach Deutsch-Ostafrika und Südafrika (Kapland, Natal und Rhodesien), 1912 – Results of a botanical research trip to German East Africa and South Africa (Cape Colony, Natal and Rhodesia).
- Vegetationsbilder aus Deutsch-Ostafrika: Regenwald von Usambara, 1914 (in: Karsten and Schenck's Vegetationsbilder) – Botanical images of German East Africa: Rainforest of Usambara.
- Chlorophyceae II: Tetrasporales, Protococcales, Einzellige Gattungen unsicherer Stellung, 1915 (with Ernst Lemmermann and Adolf Pascher) – About Chlorophyceae.
