= George Francis Scott Elliot =

George Francis Scott-Elliot FRGS FLS FRSE (1862–1934) was a botanist and academic author of Franco-Scots descent. He was a personal friend of Patrick Geddes. The standard author abbreviation Scott Elliot is used to indicate this person as the author when citing a botanical name.

== Biography ==
Scott-Elliot was born in Calcutta in India of Franco-Scots parentage. His father, James Scott Elliot (d.1880) was a merchant in Calcutta, coming from the Scottish Borders.

He went to Cambridge University in 1879 and graduated BA (Maths tripos). He then attended Edinburgh University gaining a BSc in Botany. He had a natural love of travel. His first major trip was 1888-89 when he explored South Africa Mauritius and Madagascar. In June 1890 he gave a lecture to the Linnean Society on the flora of Madagascar. He then did further studies in Libya and Egypt before being commissioned by the Franco-British Delineation Committee to define the boundaries of Sierra Leonne.

From 1896 to 1903, he lectured in Botany at the Glasgow and West of Scotland Technical College. In 1903, he undertook a tour of South America.

From 1902 to 1909 he was President of the Dumfries and Galloway Natural History and Antiquarian Society. At this period he lived at Drumwhill near New Galloway in Kirkcudbrightshire.

He was elected a Fellow of the Royal Society of Edinburgh in 1913. His proposers were Robert Kidston, John Horne, John Aitken and James Geikie. He resigned in 1927.

Although "over-age" he volunteered almost immediately at the onset of the First World War and joined the King's Own Scottish Borderers and saw active duty under fire in Egypt as a Captain and was awarded the Order of the Nile. In 1917, whilst returning home on leave, his ship was torpedoed off the coast of Italy. Ensuing ill-health from this near-drowning left him unable to rejoin his regiment on active duty, and instead he became a commanding officer in the Home Defence Corps.

He later retired with his wife to Wadhurst in Sussex to be near his brother, Lt Col William Scott Elliot DSO (1873-1943). In his final years, he returned to Scotland and died in the Moat Brae Nursing Home in Dumfries on 20 June 1934.

== Legacy ==
George Scott-Elliot is commemorated in the scientific name of a species of African chameleon, Trioceros ellioti and the plant genus Scottellia Oliv. (1893) (Achariaceae).

== Publications ==
- The Best route to Uganda (1895)
- Flora of Dumfriesshire (1896)
- A First Course in Practical Botany (1906)
- Chile: Its History and Development (1913)
- Fauna, Flora and Geology of the Clyde Area (1901)
- Prehistoric Man and His Story (1915)
- The Romance of Plant Life (1907)
- The Romance of Early British Life (1909)
- Stories of Savage Life(1919)
- A Naturalist in Africa (date unknown)
- The Romance of Savage Life (date unknown)

== Family ==
He married Annie Johnston-Stewart daughter of Robert Hathorn Johnston-Stewart of Glasserton and Physgill, in April 1896 near Whithorn in Wigtownshire. They lived originally at Wilton Mansions in Glasgow. They later moved to Kilmalcolm and finally to Kilbarchan.

His nephew was Major-General James Scott-Elliot, who also joined the King's Own Scottish Borderers and served with distinction during the Second World War.

== See also ==
- List of South African plant botanical authors
