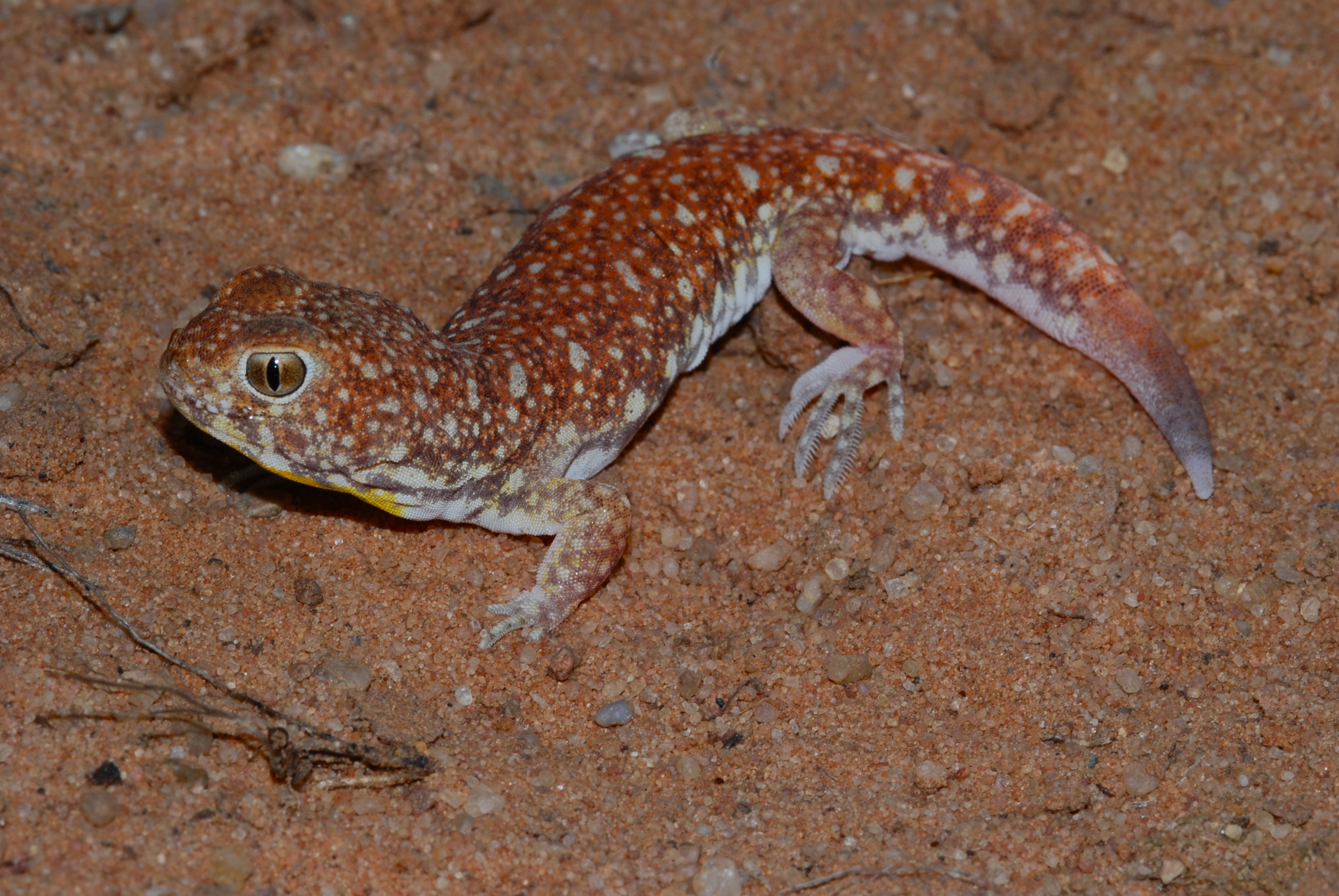

Conservation status
- Least Concern (IUCN 3.1)

Scientific classification
- Kingdom: Animalia
- Phylum: Chordata
- Class: Reptilia
- Order: Squamata
- Suborder: Gekkota
- Family: Gekkonidae
- Genus: Ptenopus
- Species: P. garrulus

Binomial name
- Ptenopus garrulus (A. Smith, 1849)

Synonyms
- Stenodactylus garrulus A. Smith, 1849

Audio
- Wails in Namibia

= Ptenopus garrulus =

Species of lizard

Ptenopus garrulus, also known commonly as the common barking gecko and the whistling gecko, is a species of lizard in the family Gekkonidae. The species is native to southern Africa. There are two recognized subspecies.

== Description ==
The dorsal coloration of P. garrulus varies from reddish brown to grayish yellow to match the local substrate. Ventrally, it is white. The toes are strongly fringed. It has 110–190 rows of scales around the body at midbody. The subspecies P.g. garrulus has more than 160 rows, but the subspecies P. g. maculatus has fewer than 160 rows. Adults usually have a snout-to-vent length (SVL) of 4.5–6 cm (1.8–2.4 in), which is relatively small for the genus.

== Geographic range ==
P. garrulus is found in Botswana, Namibia, South Africa, and Zimbabwe.

== Habitat ==
The preferred natural habitats of P. garrulus are desert, shrubland, and savanna, at altitudes from sea level to 1,500 m (4,900 ft).

== Behavior ==
P. garrulus is terrestrial and fossorial. Males vocalize from the entrances of their burrows at dusk and on moonlit nights.

== Diet ==
P. garrulus preys upon ants, beetles, and termites.

== Reproduction ==
P. garrulus is oviparous.

== Subspecies ==
Two subspecies are recognized as being valid, including the nominotypical subspecies.

- Ptenopus garrulus garrulus (A. Smith, 1849)
- Ptenopus garrulus maculatus Gray, 1866

Nota bene: A trinomial authority in parentheses indicates that the subspecies was originally described in a genus other than Ptenopus.

== Gallery ==
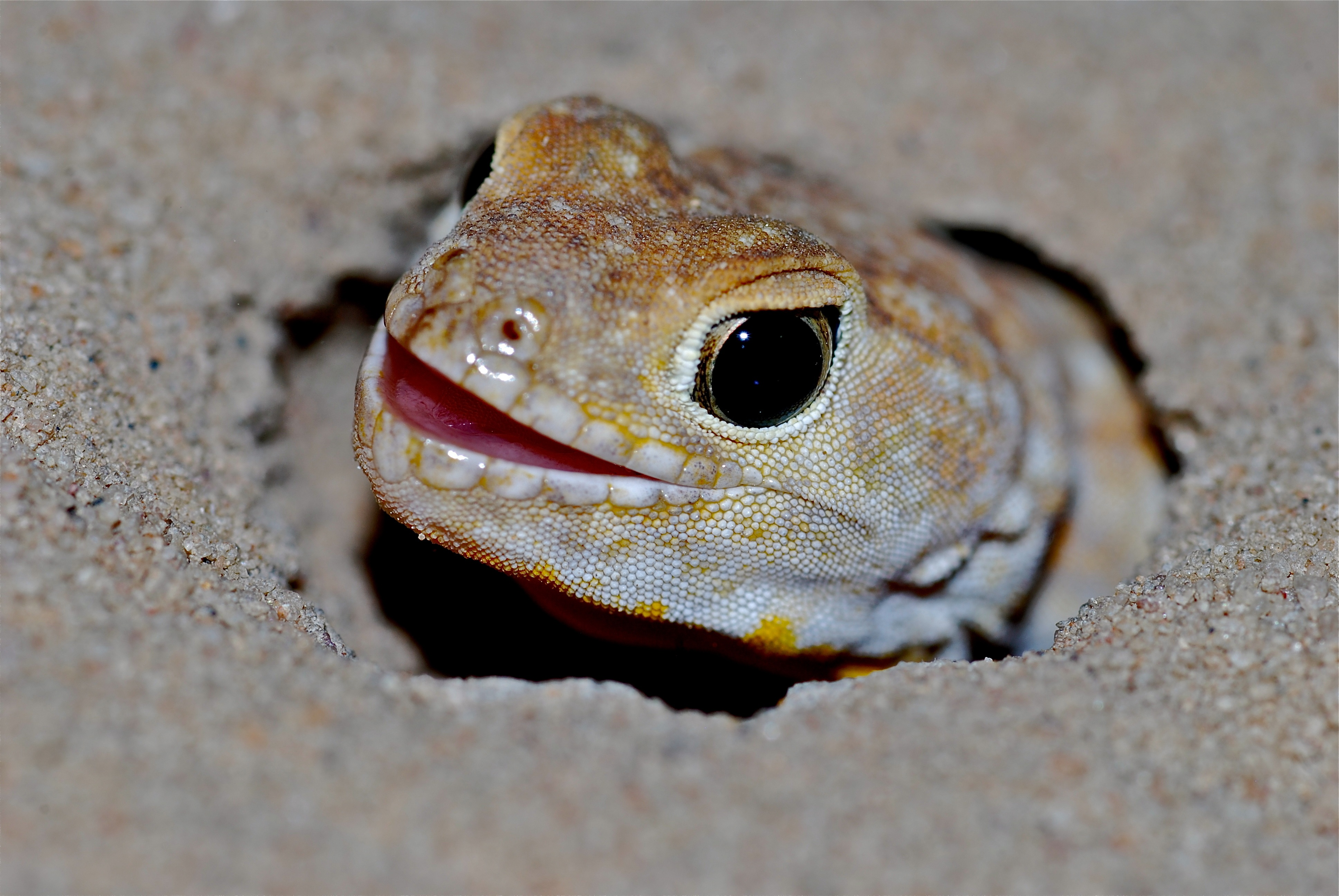
Barking from lair

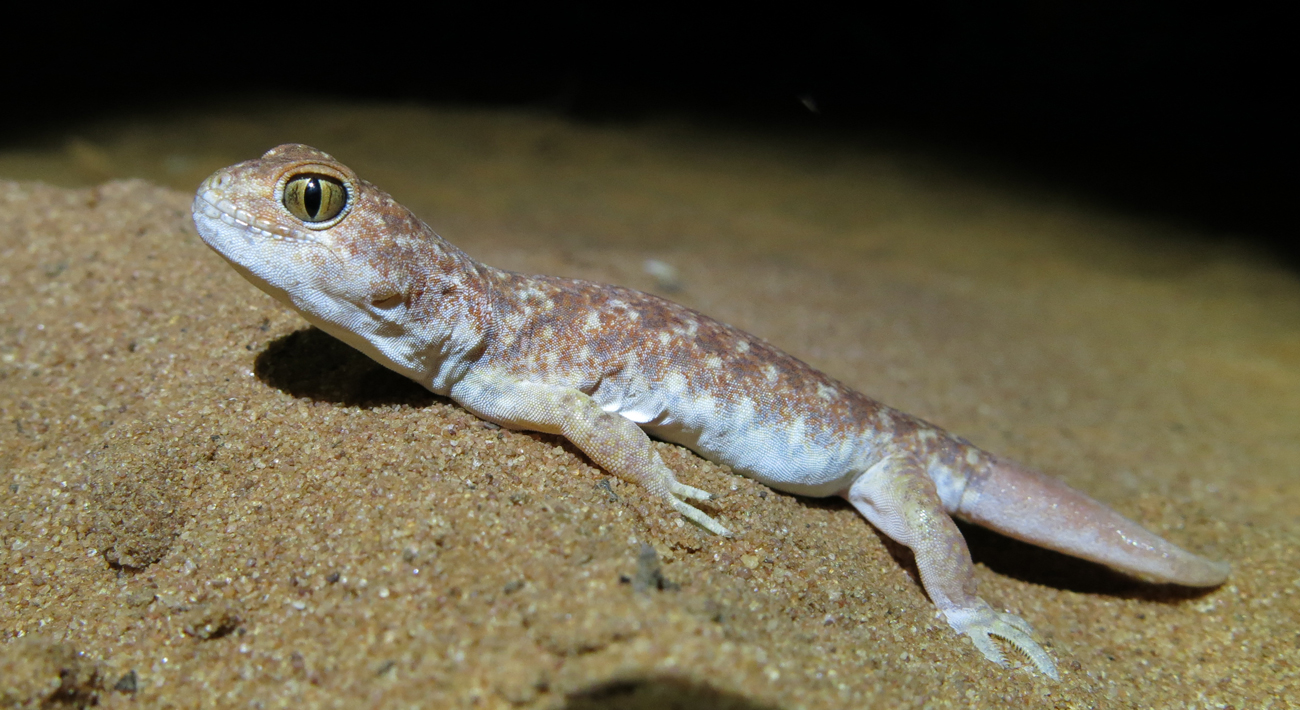
Nominate subspecies,
P. g. garrulus

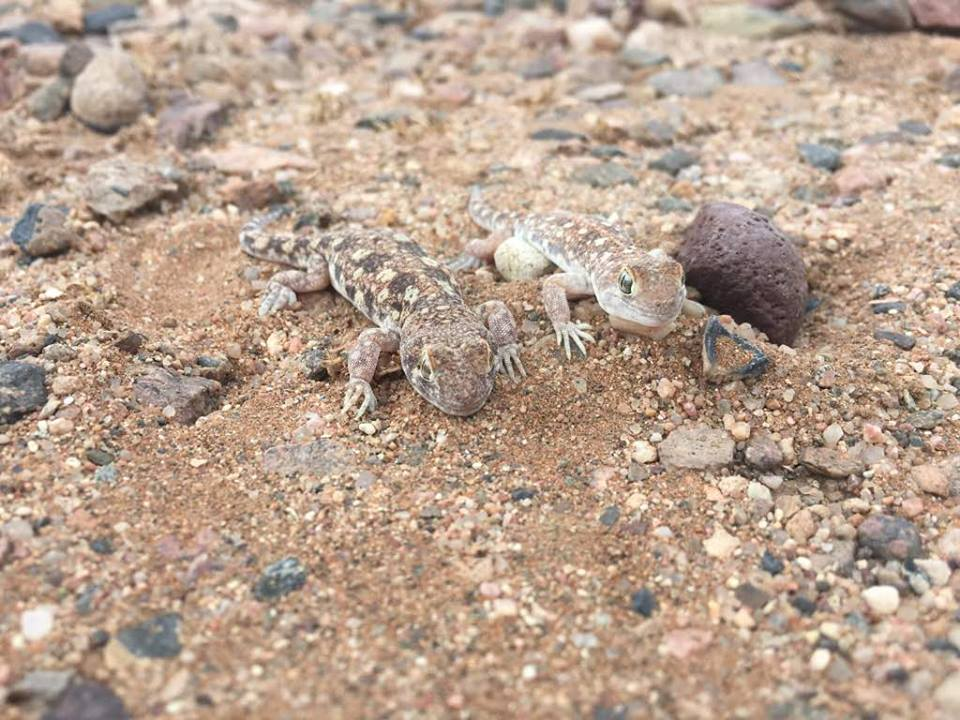
P. g. maculatus
