= Frederick Arundel Rogers =

Botanist (1876–1944)

Frederick Arundel Rogers (3 January 1876, Sherborne, Dorset, UK – 27 June 1944, London, UK) was an English-born archdeacon in the Anglican Church and an amateur botanist. He extensively collected plants, especially in southern Africa.

== Biography ==
His father was William Moyle Rogers (1835–1920), an Anglican clergyman and plant collector. F. A. Rogers was enrolled for three years from 1887 to 1890 at Marlborough College. At the University of Oxford he graduated in 1898 from Keble College with a B.A. in theology and in 1904 with an M.A. After receiving his B.A. in 1898, he received further education at Cuddesdon Theological College and was ordained an Anglican deacon in 1901 and an Anglican priest in 1902. In 1899, upon the outbreak of the Second Boer War, he went to South Africa and became in the British Army an acting lay chaplain, earning a medal and clasp. During 1899–1900 he collected plants along the Cape Midland railway line. In 1901 he returned to England and was appointed curate of St John the Divine, Kennington.

After several bouts of malarial fever, he returned in 1909 to England for 18 months. From 1911 to 1914 he headed the South African Church Railway Mission and from 1914 to 1915 also had a spell of leave to England.

He collected spermatophytes and pteridophytes wherever he travelled. His brother Charles Gilbert Rogers (1864–1937) and Charles Edward Moss (1870-1930) were his occasional co-collectors. People who collected for F. A. Rogers include Cyril Cecil Harbor (1883-1940) and W. A. H. Harbor (1857-1919) in Botswana, George Thorncroft (1857–1934) in Barberton, Mpumalanga, and Rev. William Smart in Plettenberg Bay and Graaff-Reinet. F. A. Rogers ultimately assembled a collection of over 24,000 specimens, primarily from southern Africa.

F. A. Rogers collected plants not only in southern Africa but also in tropical Africa, Iraq, Syria, Cyprus, England, Scotland, northern Ireland, France, Greece, Switzerland, and Myanmar.

His only botanical publication Provisional List of Flowering Plants and Ferns in Albany and Bathurst (Grahamstown, 1909) concerns the botany of the regions Albany, South Africa and Bathurst, Eastern Cape. The list is based on earlier work by William Henry Harvey and Selmar Schönland.

== Eponyms ==
- Eragrostis rogersii
- Sterculia rogersii
