= Lillian Louisa Britten =

South African botanist (1886-1952)

Lillian Louisa Britten (1886-1952) was a South African botanist considered the leading expert of Eastern Cape flora in her time. Britten studied at Rhodes University College in Grahamstown as a student of Selmar Schonland, and after studying in the UK, returned in 1918 to Grahamstown to be a lecturer in botany at the Rhodes University College. The standard author abbreviation L.L.Britten is used to indicate this person as the author when citing a botanical name.
