= Stanley Charles Seagrief =

South African botanist and botanical illustrator (1927-1995)

Stanley Charles Seagrief (21 February 1927 Salisbury, Rhodesia - 14 July 1995) was a South African botanist and botanical illustrator, specialising in phycology.

His first post-school studies were at Rhodes University in 1944–49, graduating with a B.Sc. in 1947 and a M.Sc. in 1950. He then attended Cambridge University in 1950-53 where he obtained a Ph.D. in 1955 for 'A Pollen Analytic Investigation of the Quaternary Period in Britain.'

== Selected works ==
- A catalogue of South African green, brown and red marine algae Mem. Bot. Surv. S. Africa 47:1-72, 1984
- The Seaweeds of the Tsitsikama Coastal National Park (1967) (illustrations by author)
- Establishment of Podocarpus latifolius in Blackwood plantation at the Hogsback S. Afr. J. Science 6(1):433-7, 1965
- The Lukanga Swamps of Northern Rhodesia J. South Afr. Bot. 10:251-2, 1962
- Pollen diagrams from Southern England. Elstead, Surrey New Phytol. 59:84-91, 1960 (with H. Godwin)
- Some investigations on the vegetation of the north-eastern part of Makarikari Salt Pan, Bechuanaland Proc. Trans. Rhod. Sci. Ass. 46:103-33, 1958 (with R.B. Drummond)
- Studies in the plant ecology of Fern Kloof near Grahamstown (1950)
