= Alma May Waterman =

American botanist (1893-1977)

Alma May Waterman (1893-1977) was an American botanist, mycologist, and plant pathologist noted for studying diseases of shade and ornamental trees, as well as diseases of roses. She did research on Septoria cankers, specifically that affect poplar trees, in the 1950s. The standard author abbreviation Waterman is used to indicate this person as the author when citing a botanical name.

== Works ==
- Waterman, Alma May (1932). Rose Diseases: Their Causes and Control. U.S. Department of Agriculture.
- Marshall, Rush Porter; Waterman, Alma May (1948). Common Diseases of Important Shade Trees. U.S. Department of Agriculture.
- Waterman, Alma May (1954). Septoria canker of poplars in the United States. U.S. Dept. of Agriculture.
- Waterman, Alma May (1954). Surface Sterilization of Hybrid Poplar Cuttings. USDA Forest Service, Northeastern Forest Experiment Station.
