= Hermann Merxmüller =

German botanist (1920–1988)

- Born: 30 August 1920; Munich
- Died: 8 February 1988 (aged 67); Munich, Germany
- Education: Ludwig-Maximilians-Universität München
- Known for: Taxonomy of Compositae, African flora, Alpine flora
- Notable work: Prodromus einer Flora von Südwestafrika, Compositenstudien
- Scientific career
- Fields: Botany, Taxonomy, Plant geography
- Workplaces: Botanische Staatssammlung München
- Author abbrev. (botany): Merxm

Hermann Merxmüller (30 August 1920, Munich – 8 February 1988) was a German botanist and taxonomist.

Merxmüller's interest in botany was noticed at an early age by his mentors, and he was encouraged to collect in the Bavarian Alps and countryside. At the age of 17, he joined the Bavarian Botanical Society and at the end of World War II was awarded a scholarship by the Maximilian Foundation, enabling him to study biology at the Ludwig-Maximilians-Universität München. He completed his studies with a dissertation on plant distribution in the Alps, then taking up a post as scientific assistant at the Botanische Staatssammlung München. Here the institute's director, Karl Suessenguth, employed him to assist in the creation of a prodromus or introductory treatise on Namibian plants, "Prodromus einer Flora von Südwestafrika". Merxmüller's interests led him to the genus Hieracium, and eventually to an abiding interest in the family Compositae. He visited Namibia on five occasions, collecting mostly in the company of Willi Giess. Compositenstudien I (1950), an analysis of the collections of Sigmund Rehm from South West Africa, the Transvaal, and the Cape Province, was the first of 11 volumes, the last published in 1984. Suessenguth and Merxmüller produced only one joint publication "A contribution to the flora of the Marandellas District, Southern Rhodesia" (1951).

Merxmüller was an authority on the flowering plants of Africa, and discovered more than 100 new plant species in his expeditions to that continent. He also wrote extensively on Mediterranean and Alpine flora. His publications were on general systematics, taxonomy, cytotaxonomy, and plant geography. He is commemorated in the genus Merxmuellera Conert, and many species, including Barleria merxmuelleri P.G. Meyer, Carex merxmuelleri Podlech, Corchorus merxmuelleri Wild, Erica merxmuelleri Dulffer, Hermannia merxmuelleri Friedr. etc.

Merxmüller headed the Botanische Staatsammlung for more than 25 years, during which time he became a recognized authority in the world of systematic botany. Heinrich Nothdurft worked at the State Institute of Applied Botany in Hamburg, and collaborated with Merxmüller and Kräusel on "Sträucher und Bäume". All had a share in the success of the Kronen-Verlag and the implementation of Erich Cramer's original idea - bring together prominent natural scientists and distinguished artists to create a unique work depicting the exact form and colour of each species, while reflecting its diversity and aesthetic beauty.

== Publications ==
- Alpenflora; die wichtigeren Alpenpflanzen Bayerns, Österreichs und der Schweiz - Gustav Hegi, Hermann Merxmuller ISBN 3489900200 (3-489-90020-0)
- The young specialist looks at pond-life - Wolfgang Engelhardt and Hermann Merxmüller; translated [from the German] by Heather J. Fisher, edited and adapted by Roderick C. Fisher, illustrated by Irmgard Engelhardt
- Prodromus einer Flora von Südwestafrika
- Mitteilungen der Botanischen Staatssammlung München
- Merxmüller, H; J Grau. (1963). Chromosomenzahlen aus der Gattung Myosotis L.. Ber. Deutsch. Bot. Ges. 76: 23–29.
- Merxmüller, H; J Grau. (1967). Moehringia-Studien. — Mitt. Bot. München 6: 257–273.
- Merxmüller, H; J Grau. (1968). Ergänzende Studien an Petrocoptis (Caryophyllaceae) — Coll. Bot. 7: 787–797.
- Grau, J; H Merxmüller. (1972). Myosotis, in: Flora Europaea III: 111–117.
- Merxmüller, H; J Grau. (1976). Fruchtanatomische Untersuchungen in der Inula-Gruppe (Astereae). — Publ. Cairo Univ. Herb. 7 & 8: 9—20.
- Кarl Suessenguth, Нermann Merxmüller. (1951). A contribution to the flora of the Marandellas district, Southern Rhodesia. Transactions, Rhodesia Scientific Association. 86 pp.
- (1960). Die Compositen-Gattungen Südwestafrikas. 87 pp.
- (1960). Mitteleuropäische Pflanzenwelt. 288 pp.
- (1967). Flore d'Europe: Plantes herbacées et sous-arbrisseaux. Volume 1 of Flore d'Europe.
- Gustav Hegi, Hermann Merxmüller. (1968). Alpenflora. 112 pp.
- Gustav Hegi, Hermann Merxmüller. (1976). Alpenflora: die wichtigeren Alpenpflanzen Bayerns, Österreichs und der Schweiz. 157 pp. ISBN 3-489-90020-0.
- Нermann Meusel, Нermann Merxmüller, Кarl Нeinz Rechinger. (1994). Lebensgeschichte der Gold- und Silberdisteln: Artenvielfalt und Stammesgeschichte der Gattung: zum Gedächtnis an Hermann Merxmüller und für Karl-Heinz Rechinger, Volume 2. 657 pp. ISBN 3-211-86558-6.
- Untersuchungen zur Sippengliederung und Arealbildung in den Alpen - Hermann Merxmüller (1952)
- Was lebt in Tümpel, Bach und Weiher?: eine Einführung in die Lehre vom Leben der Binnengewässer - Wolfgang Engelhardt (1959)
- Mitteleuropäische Pflanzenwelt: Kräuter und Stauden: eine Auswahl unter Berücksichtigung der in Deutschland geschützten Arten (1957)
- Mitteleuropäische Pflanzenwelt: Sträucher und Bäume: 144 Arten auf 144 Tafeln: eine Auswahl unter Berücksichtigung der in Deutschland geschützten Arten (1960)
- Kräuter und Stauden: 168 Einzeldarstellungen auf 168 Tafeln in 6-8-farbigem Offsetdruck: eine Auswahl unter Berücksichtigung der in Deutschland geschützten Arten (1957)
- Kleinere botanische Veröffentlichungen
- Sträucher und Bäume: 144 Arten auf 144 Tafeln in 7-9-farbigem Offsetdruck
