= Johan Wilhelm Heinrich Giess =

- Born: 21 February 1910; Frankfurt-am-Main, Germany
- Died: 28 September 2000 (aged 90); Swakopmund, Namibia
- Occupations: Botanist; Herbarium curator
- Years active: 1953–1975 (curator)
- Known for: Founder and first curator of the National Herbarium of Namibia
- Awards: Linnean Medal (1968); Gold Medal from the South African Academy of Sciences (1980)

Harpagophytum procumbens Drawing by Giess during his internment

Johan Wilhelm Heinrich Giess aka Willi Giess (21 February 1910, in Frankfurt-am-Main – 28 September 2000, in Swakopmund) is noted for having started an official herbarium at Windhoek, his extensive collection of Namibian plants and generally furthering botanical knowledge of the territory.

Giess arrived in South West Africa with his parents on 4 February 1926 and was drawn into farming by being one of the first students to attend the Agricultural College of Neudamm near Windhoek. From 1931-33 he was employed by the Animal Breeding Institute at the University of Halle where he specialised in karakul breeding. On his return to South West Africa, he managed a karakul farm and later bought his own farm in 1937 at Dornfontein Süd.

With the outbreak of the Second World War he and other Germans were interned in South Africa at a camp called Andalusia, now known as Jan Kempdorp. During his internment he studied botany with Prof. Otto Heinrich Volk, who had arranged classes for scholars in the camp. The tuition they received in the various sciences was of sufficient quality to be recognised after the war as being of university standard.

As an ancillary activity Volk taught the students practical botany, assembling a herbarium from plants growing within the confines of the camp. The students also produced a booklet, a key to the genera of grasses, entitled "Bestimmungschlüssel für Südwest-Afrikanische Grasgattungen", illustrated with engravings on pieces of wood and typeset with lead from toothpaste tubes. Some of the type and engravings are on display at the Swakopmund Museum.

Immediately after his release, Giess was employed as plant collector at the University of Stellenbosch. His botanical training during the war had not been forgotten, and in 1953 he was offered the post of curator at the national herbarium in Windhoek.

The nucleus of the new herbarium was a donation of 2 000 specimens from the initiator of the scheme, Prof Heinrich Walter of Hohenheim Technical University. Giess spent four years establishing the infrastructure of the herbarium, while continuing work on his farm. When the South West African Administration assumed management of the herbarium in 1957 they offered Giess the curatorship on a permanent basis, a post in which he served until his retirement in 1975.

Giess resumed work under M.A.N. Müller, his successor. During his association with the herbarium he collected some 18 750 meticulously labelled specimens which are housed at BM, K, LUA, M, NBG, P, PRE and WIND. His field trips ranged over most of Namibia, visiting remote regions such as the Okavango River, Brandberg, Lüderitz, Erongo Mountains and Kaokoveld. He was founding editor of the botanical journal Dinteria (1968-1991) and compiled a Preliminary Vegetation Map of South West Africa (1971) and Bibliography of South West African Botany (1989).

== Awards & honours ==
- 1968 Lineé Medal (silver) from the Royal Academy of Sciences
- 1980 Gold medal from the South African Academy of Sciences
- 1980 Recognised by the Bavarian Academy of Sciences for his contribution to Merxmüller's Prodromus einer Flora von Südwestafrika

Giess is commemorated in the names of numerous plant species, a beetle and a termite. This botanist is denoted by the author abbreviation Giess when citing a botanical name.

== Bibliography ==
- Grasse Van Suidwes Afrika/Namibie - Blythe Loutit, M. A. N. Muller, W. Giess (Département Agriculture and Nature Conservation, 1983) ISBN 0-620-06582-6
- Bibliography of South West African Botany - W. Giess (S.W.A. Wissenschaftliche Gesellschaft, 1989) ISBN 0-949995-46-0
