= List of botanists by author abbreviation (S) =

This is an incomplete list of botanists by their author abbreviation, which is designed for citation with the botanical names or works that they have published. This list follows that established by Brummitt & Powell (1992). Use of that list is recommended by Rec. 46A Note 1 of the International Code of Nomenclature for algae, fungi, and plants. The list is kept up to date online at The International Plant Names Index and Index Fungorum.

In some cases an "author abbreviation" consists of a full surname, while in other cases the surname is abbreviated and/or accompanied by one or more initials. There is no space between the initials and the surname (or its abbreviation).

==== Order of entries ====
The list here is maintained strictly in order of the alphabetic characters in the abbreviation; thus "A.B.Jacks." appears under "A" not "J", and is located as if the characters were "ABJACKS". Capitalization is ignored as are all non-alphabetic characters such as "." and space. Diacritical marks are also ignored, so that, e.g., "ü" is treated as if it were "u".

==== Navigation ====
Because of its length, the list is split across separate pages. All alphabetic sections can be accessed from the short table of contents; the vertical bars show the page divisions. Searching will only find an entry within a page.

== A–R ==
Contents:	A	B	C	D	E F	G	H	I J	K L	M	N O	P	Q R	S	T U V	W X Y Z

To find entries for A–R, use the table of contents above.

== S ==
Contents: Top	A	B	C	D	E F	G	H	I J	K L	M	N O	P	Q R	S	T U V	W X Y Z

- Sabine – Joseph Sabine (1770–1837)
- Sabourin – Lucien Sabourin (1904–1987)
- Sacc. – Pier Andrea Saccardo (1845–1920)
- Sachet – Marie-Hélène Sachet (1922–1986)
- Sachs – Julius von Sachs (1832–1897)
- S.A.Cain – Stanley Adair Cain (1902–1995)
- Sacleux – Charles Sacleux (1856–1943)
- Sadeb. – Richard Emil Benjamin Sadebeck (1839–1905)
- Sadler – Joseph Sadler (1791–1849)
- Saelán – Anders Thiodolf Saelán (1834–1921)
- Saff. – William Edwin Safford (1859–1926)
- Sagást. – Abundio Sagástegui Alva (1932–2012)
- S.A.Hammer – Steven Allen Hammer (born 1951)
- Sahlb. – Carl Reinhold Sahlberg (1779–1860)
- Sahni – Birbal Sahni (1891–1949)
- S.A.J.Bell – Stephen Andrew James Bell (born 1967)
- Saka - Mariana Naomi Saka (fl. 2014)
- S.Akiyama – Shinobu Akiyama (born 1957)
- Sa.Kurata – Satoru Kurata (1922–1978)
- Salisb. – Richard Anthony Salisbury (1761–1829)
- Salmaki – Yasaman Salmaki (fl. 2016)
- Salm-Dyck – Joseph zu Salm-Reifferscheidt-Dyck (1773–1861)
- Salmon – John Drew Salmon (1802–1859)
- Salter – Samuel James Augustus Salter (1825–1897)
- Sam. – Gunnar Samuelsson (1885–1944)
- Sambo – Maria Cengia Sambo (1888–1939)
- S.A.Mori – Scott Alan Mori (1941–2020)
- Samp. – Gonçalo António da Silva Ferreira Sampaio (1865–1937)
- Sander – Henry Frederick Conrad Sander (1847–1920)
- S.Andrews – Susyn M. Andrews (born 1953)
- Sandwith – Noel Yvri Sandwith (1901–1965)
- S.A.Nikitin – Sergei Alekseevich Nikitin (1898–1982)
- S.Anil Kumar – S. Anil Kumar (fl. 2008)
- Sanín – Maria José Sanín (fl. 2008)
- Sanio – Carl Gustav Sanio (1832–1891)
- Sanjappa – Munivenkatappa Sanjappa (born 1951)
- Sankowsky – G. Sankowsky (fl. 2003)
- Santapau – Hermenegild Santapau (1903–1970)
- Santi – Giorgio Santi (1746–1822)
- Santin – Dionete Aparecida Santin (fl. 1991)
- Saporta – Louis Charles Joseph Gaston de Saporta (1823–1895)
- Saralegui – Hildelisa Saralegui Boza (born 1949)
- Sarasin – Karl Friedrich Sarasin (1859–1942)
- Sarato – César Sarato (1829–1893)
- Sarauw – Georg Frederik Ludvig Sarauw (1862–1928)
- Sarg. – Charles Sprague Sargent (1841–1927)
- S.Arn. – Samuel Arnott (1852–1930)
- Sarnth. – Ludwig von Sarnthein (1861–1914)
- Sart. – Giovanni Battista Sartorelli (1780–1853)
- Sartori – Joseph Sartori (1809–1885)
- Sartwell – Henry Parker Sartwell (1792–1867)
- Sasaki – Shun-ichi Sasaki (1888–1960)
- Sasidh. – N. Sasidharan (born 1952)
- Sathap. – Apirada Sathapattayanon (fl. 2010)
- Satow – Ernest Mason Satow (1843–1929)
- Sauleda – Ruben Primitivo Sauleda (born 1946)
- Sauss. – Horace-Bénédict de Saussure (1740–1799)
- Sauv. – Camille François Sauvageau (1861–1936)
- Sauvages – François Boissier de Sauvages de Lacroix (1706–1767)
- Sauvalle – Francisco Adolfo Sauvalle (1807–1879)
- Sav. – Paul Amedée Ludovic Savatier (1830–1891)
- Savi – Gaetano Savi (1769–1844)
- Savign – Francesco Savignone (born 1818)
- Savigny – Marie Jules César Lélorgne de Savigny (1777–1851)
- Săvul. – Traian Săvulescu (1889–1963)
- Saw – Leng Guan Saw (fl. 1997)
- S.A.Williams – S.A. Williams (fl. 2003)
- Sax – Karl Sax (1892–1973)
- Saxton – W.T. Saxton (fl. 1913)
- Say – Thomas Say (1787–1834)
- Sayre – Geneva Sayre (1911–1992)
- S.B.Andrews – Spencer Bruce Andrews (1931–2022)
- Sbarbaro – Camillo Sbarbaro (1888–1967)
- S.B.Heard – Stephen B. Heard (fl. 1988)
- S.B.Jones – Samuel Boscom Jones (1933–2016)
- S.B.Jundz. – Stanisław Bonifacy Jundziłł (1761–1847)
- S.Blackmore – Stephen Blackmore (born 1952)
- S.Boyd – Steve Boyd (fl. 1997)
- S.Br. (also S.Brown) – Stewardson Brown (1867–1921)
- S.Brunner – Samuel Brunner (1790–1844)
- Scamman – Edith Scamman (1882–1967)
- Scannell – Maura J.P. Scannell (1924–2011)
- S.Carter – Susan Carter Holmes (born 1933)
- S.C.Chen – Sing Chi Chen (1931–2021)
- S.C.Darwin – Sarah Darwin (born 1964)
- Schaack – Clark G. Schaack (fl. 1987)
- Schacht – Hermann Schacht (1814–1864)
- Schaeff. – Jacob Christian Schaeffer (1718–1790)
- Schäferh. – Bastian Schäferhoff (fl. 2009)
- Schäf.-Verw. – Alfons Schäfer-Verwimp (born 1950)
- Schah. – Richard B. Schahinger (born 1955)
- Schallert – Paul Otto Schallert (1879–1970)
- Schangin – Petr Ivanovich Schangin (1741–1816)
- Scharf – Uwe Scharf (born 1965)
- Schauer – Johannes Conrad Schauer (1813–1848)
- S.C.H.Barrett – Spencer C. H. Barrett (born 1948)
- Sch.Bip. – Carl Heinrich "Bipontinus" Schultz (1805–1867)
- Schchian – Anna Semenovna Schchian (1905–1990)
- Scheb. – Marija Aleksandrovna Schebalina (born 1900)
- Scheele – George Heinrich Adolf Scheele (1808–1864)
- Scheer – Friedrich Scheer (1792–1868)
- Scheff. – Rudolph Herman Christiaan Carel Scheffer (1844–1880)
- Scheffers – W. A. Scheffers (fl. 1981)
- Scheffler – Wolfram Scheffler (born 1938)
- Scheibe – Arnold Scheibe (1901–1989)
- Scheidw. – Michael Joseph François Scheidweiler (1799–1861)
- Scheinvar – Léia Scheinvar (born 1930)
- Scheit – Max Scheit (1858–1888)
- Schelk. – Alexandr Bebutovicz Schelkownikow (1870–1933)
- Schelle – Ernst Schelle (1864–1945)
- Schellenb. – Hans Conrad Schellenberg (1872–1923)
- Schelpe – Edmund André Charles Louis Eloi Schelpe (1924–1985)
- Schelver – Friedrich Joseph Schelver (1778–1832)
- Schemmann – Wilhelm Schemmann (1845 – c. 1920)
- Schemske – Douglas W. Schemske (born 1948)
- Schenck – Johann Heinrich Rudolf Schenck (1860–1927)
- Schenk – Joseph August Schenk (1815–1891)
- Scherb. – Johannes Scherbius (1769–1813)
- Scherer – Johann Andreas Scherer (1755–1844)
- Scherfel – Aurel Wilhelm Scherfel (1835–1895)
- Scherff. – Aladár Scherffel (1865–1938)
- Schery – Robert Walter Schery (1917–1987)
- Schettler – Roland Schettler (fl. 1999)
- Scheuchzer f. – Johannes Scheuchzer (1738–1815)
- Scheuerm. – Richard Scheuermann (1873–1949)
- Scheutz – Nils Johan Wilhelm Scheutz (1836–1889)
- Schew. – Vladimir Shevyakov (1859–1930)
- Schewe – O. Schewe (born 1892)
- Scheygr. – Arie Scheygrond (1905–1996)
- Schiede – Christian Julius Wilhelm Schiede (1798–1836)
- Schiffn. – Victor Félix Schiffner (1862–1944)
- Schild. – Herbert Schildhauer (born 1963)
- Schimp. – Wilhelm Philippe Schimper (1808–1880)
- Schindl. – Anton Karl Schindler (1879–1964)
- Schinz – Hans Schinz (1858–1941)
- Schipcz. – Nikolaj Valerianovich Schipczinski (1886–1955)
- Schipp – William August Schipp (1891–1967)
- Schischk. – Boris Konstantinovich Schischkin (1886–1963)
- Schkuhr – Christian Schkuhr (1741–1811)
- Schleich. – Johann Christoph Schleicher (1768–1834)
- Schleid. – Matthias Jakob Schleiden (1804–1881)
- Schlieph. – Karl Schliephacke (1834–1913)
- Schltdl. – Diederich Franz Leonhard von Schlechtendal (1794–1866)
- Schltr. – Rudolf Schlechter (1872–1925)
- Schmalh. – Johannes Theodor Schmalhausen (1849–1894)
- Schmeil – Franz Otto Schmeil (1860–1943)
- Schmidel – Casimir Christoph Schmidel (1718–1792)
- Schmoll – Hazel Marguerite Schmoll (1891–1990)
- Schnabl – Johann Nepomuk Schnabl (1853–1899)
- Schnack – Benno Julio Christian Schnack (1910–1981)
- Schnarf – Karl Schnarf (1879–1947)
- Schneck – Jacob Schneck (1843–1906)
- Schnee – Ludwig Schnee (1908–1975)
- Schneev. – George Voorhelm Schneevoogt (1775–1850)
- Schnegg – Hans Schnegg (1875–1950)
- Schneid.-Bind. – E. Schneider-Binder (born 1942)
- Schneid.-Or. – Otto Schneider-Orelli (1880–1965)
- Schnekker – Johannes Daniel Schnekker (1746–1786)
- Schnell – Raymond Albert Alfred Schnell (1913–1999)
- Schneller – Johann Jakob Schneller (born 1942)
- Schnepf – Eberhard Schnepf (1931–2016)
- Schnetter – Reinhard Schnetter (born 1936)
- Schnetzl. – Johann Balthasar Schnetzler (1823–1896)
- Schnittsp. – Georg Friedrich Schnittspahn (1810–1865)
- Schnizl. – Adalbert Carl Friedrich Hellwig Conrad Schnizlein (1814–1868)
- Schodde – Richard Schodde (born 1936)
- Schoenef. – Wladimir de Schoenefeld (1816–1875)
- Schoepff – Johann David Schoepff (1752–1800)
- Schol. – Per Fredrik Scholander (1905–-1980)
- Schönb.-Tem. – Eva Schönbeck-Temesy (1930–2011)
- Schönl. – Johann Lucas Schönlein (1793–1864)
- Schönland – Selmar Schönland (1860–1940)
- Schornh. (also Breen) – Ruth Olive Schornhurst Breen (1905–1987)
- Schot – Anne M. Schot (fl. 1991–2004)
- Schott – Heinrich Wilhelm Schott (1794–1865)
- Schottky – Ernst Max Schottky (1888–1915)
- Schousb. – Peder Kofod Anker Schousboe (1766–1832)
- S.Chow – Shuan Chow (fl. 1962)
- S.Chowdhury – S. Chowdhury (fl. 1944)
- Schrad. – Heinrich Adolph Schrader (1767–1836)
- Schrank – Franz von Paula Schrank (1747–1835)
- Schraut – Winfried Schraut (fl. 2004)
- Schreb. – Johann Christian Daniel von Schreber (1739–1810)
- Schrenk – Alexander Gustav von Schrenk (1816–1876)
- Schrire – Brian David Schrire (born 1953)
- Schrödinger – Rudolf Schrödinger (1857–1919)
- Schröt. – Carl Joseph Schröter (1855–1939)
- Schub. – Gotthilf Heinrich von Schubert (1780–1860)
- Schübl. – Gustav Schübler (1787–1834)
- Schuch. – (Conrad Gideon) Theodor Schuchardt (1829–1892)
- Schuit. – André Schuiteman (born 1960)
- Schult. – Josef August Schultes (1773–1831)
- Schult.f. – Julius Hermann Schultes (1804–1840)
- Schultz – Carl Friedrich Schultz (1765 or 1766–1837)
- Schultz Sch. – Carl Heinrich "Schultzenstein" Schultz (1798–1871)
- Schum. – Julius (Heinrich Karl) Schumann (1810–1868)
- Schumach. – Heinrich Christian Friedrich Schumacher (1757–1830)
- Schur – Philipp Johann Ferdinand Schur (1799–1878)
- Schuyler – Alfred Ernest Schuyler (born 1935)
- Schwägr. – Christian Friedrich Schwägrichen (1775–1853)
- Schwantes – Martin Heinrich Gustav Schwantes (1881–1960)
- Schwartz – Ernest Justus Schwartz (1869–1939)
- Schweick. – Herold Georg Wilhelm Johannes Schweickerdt (1903–1977)
- Schweigg. – August Friedrich Schweigger (1783–1821)
- Schwein. – Lewis David von Schweinitz (1780–1834)
- Schweinf. – Georg August Schweinfurth (1836–1925)
- Schwer. – Fritz Kurt Alexander von Schwerin (1856–1934)
- S.Clay – Sampson Clay (1901–1980)
- S.C.Keeley – Sterling C. Keeley (born 1948)
- S.C.Lee – Shun Ching Lee (1892–1969)
- Scop. – Giovanni Antonio Scopoli (1723–1788)
- Scort. – Benedetto Scortechini (1845–1886)
- Scott-Elliot – George Francis Scott-Elliot (1862–1934)
- Scribn. – Frank Lamson Scribner (1851–1938)
- S.C.Srivast. – Suresh Chandra Srivastava (born 1944)
- S.C.Sun – Siang Chung Sun (1908–1994)
- S.C.Tucker – Shirley Cotter Tucker (born 1927)
- S.Curtis – Samuel Curtis (1779–1860)
- S.D.Jones – Stanley D. Jones (born 1948)
- S.D.Lawson – Sheryl D. Lawson (fl. 2006)
- S.Dransf. – Soejatmi Dransfield (born 1939)
- S.Dressler – Stefan Dressler (born 1964)
- S.D.Sundb. – Scott D. Sundberg (1954–2004)
- Seagrief – Stanley Charles Seagrief (1927–1995)
- Sealy – Joseph Robert Sealy (1907–2000)
- Seaton – Henry Eliason Seaton (1869–1893)
- Seaver – Fred Jay Seaver (1877–1970)
- Sebert – Hippolyte Sebert (1839–1930)
- Sebsebe – Sebsebe Demissew (born 1953)
- Seçmen – Özcan Seçmen (born 1947)
- Secondat – Jean Baptiste de Secondat (1716–1796)
- Secr. – Louis Secretan (1758–1839)
- Sedgw. – Leonard John Sedgwick (1883–1925)
- Seelanan – Tosak Seelanan (fl. 2010)
- Seem. – Berthold Carl Seemann (1825–1871)
- Seemen – Karl Otto von Seemen (1838–1910)
- Seenus – Josef von Seenus (1825–1871)
- Seetzen – Ulrich Jasper Seetzen (1767–1811)
- S.E.Freire – Susana Edith Freire (born 1954)
- S.E.Fröhner – Sigurd Erich Fröhner (born 1941)
- Ség. – Jean François Séguier (1703–1784)
- Seibert – Russell Jacob Seibert (1914–2004)
- Seidenf. – Gunnar Seidenfaden (1908–2001)
- Seidl – Wenzel Benno Seidl (1773–1842)
- Seigler – David Stanley Seigler (born 1940)
- Seisums – A. G. Seisums (born 1962)
- Sekera – Wenzel Johann Vaclav Jan Sekera (1815–1875)
- Selander – Nils Sten Edvard Selander (1891–1957)
- Sello – Hermann Ludwig Sello (1800–1876)
- Sellow – Friedrich Sellow (Sello) (1789–1831)
- Selvak. – R. Selvakumari (fl. 2009)
- Semaan – Myrna T. Semaan (born 1968)
- Semir – João Semir (1937–2018)
- Semple – John C. Semple (born 1947)
- Sendtn. – Otto Sendtner (1813–1859)
- Seneb. – Jean Senebier (1742–1809)
- Senghas – Karlheinz Senghas (1928–2004)
- Senn – Gustav Alfred Senn (1875–1945)
- Sennen – Frère Sennen (1861–1937)
- Sennholz – Gustav Sennholz (1850–1895)
- Sennikov – Alexander Nikolaevitsch Sennikov (born 1972)
- Senterre – Bruno Senterre (born 1976)
- Ser. – Nicolas Charles Seringe (1776–1858)
- Serg. – Lydia Palladievna Sergievskaya (1897–1970)
- Serra – Luis Serra (born 1966)
- Servett. – Camille Servettaz (1870–1947)
- Sessé – Martín Sessé y Lacasta (1751–1808)
- Setch. – William Albert Setchell (1864–1943)
- Seub. – Moritz August Seubert (1818–1878)
- Seward – Albert Charles Seward (1863–1941)
- S.F.Blake – Sidney Fay Blake (1892–1959)
- S.F.Gray – Samuel Frederick Gray (1766–1828)
- S.F.Price – Sarah Frances Price (1849–1903)
- S.Fuentes – Susy Fuentes-Bazan (fl. 2011)
- S.G.Gmel. – Samuel Gottlieb Gmelin (c. 1744–1774)
- S.G.Hao – Shou Gang Hao (born 1942)
- S.Gibson – Samuel Gibson (1790–1849)
- S.G.M.Carr – Stella Grace Maisie Carr (1912–1988)
- S.G.Pradhan – Sudhir Gajanan Pradhan (born 1950)
- S.G.Zhang – Shi Gang Zhang (fl. 2005)
- Shadbolt – George Shadbolt (1817–1901)
- Shafer – John Adolph Shafer (1863–1918)
- Shakhm. – Irshat Shakirovich Shakhmedov (1936–2021)
- Shaler – Nathaniel Southgate Shaler (1841–1906)
- Sharman – Percy J. Sharman (fl. 1916)
- Sharp – Aaron John Sharp (1904–1997)
- Sharsm. – Carl William Sharsmith (1903–1994)
- S.Hatt. – Sinske Hattori (1915–1992)
- Shaulo - Dmitri N. Shaulo (born 1954)
- Shaver – Jesse Milton Shaver (1888–1961)
- Shear – Cornelius Lott Shear (1865–1956)
- S.Heller – Sascha Heller (fl. 2017)
- Sheppard – Harriet Campbell Sheppard (1786–1858)
- Sherff – Earl Edward Sherff (1886–1966)
- Sherman – Harry L. Sherman (born 1927)
- Sheviak – Charles John Sheviak (born 1947)
- Shevock – James Robert Shevock (born 1950)
- S.H.Fu – Shu Hsia Fu (1916–1986)
- Shibata – Keita Shibata (1877–1949)
- Shig.Suzuki – Shigetaka Suzuki (fl. 1961)
- Shiller – Ivan Shiller (1895–1984)
- Shim – Phyau Soon Shim (born 1942)
- Shimek – Bohumil Shimek (1861–1937)
- Shinners – Lloyd Herbert Shinners (1918–1971)
- Shipunov – Aleksey Borisovich Shipunov (1965–2022)
- Shiras. – Yasuyoshi (Miho or Homi) Shirasawa (1868–1947)
- S.H.Kang – Shin Ho Kang (born 1968)
- Sh.Kurata – Shigeo Kurata (born 1939)
- S.H.Lin – Shan Hsiung Lin (born 1942)
- S.H.Oh – Sang-Hun Oh (fl. 2006)
- Shockley – William Hillman Shockley (1855–1925)
- Short – Charles Wilkins Short (1794–1863)
- Shreve – Forrest Shreve (1878–1950)
- Shrock – Robert Rakes Shrock (1904–1993)
- Shull – George Harrison Shull (1874–1954)
- Shultz – Benjamin Shultz (1772–1814)
- Shute – Cedric H. Shute (fl. 1989)
- Shuttlew. – Robert James Shuttleworth (1810–1874)
- Shu H.Wu – Shu Hui Wu (fl. 2012)
- S.H.Wright – Samuel Hart Wright (1825–1905)
- S.H.Yeau –Sung Hee Yeau (fl. 2012)
- Sibi – M. Sibi (fl. 2008)
- Sibth. – John Sibthorp (1758–1796)
- Sickenb. – Ernst Sickenberger (1831–1895)
- Siebe – Max Siebe (fl. 1903)
- Sieber – Franz Sieber (1789–1844)
- Siebert – August Siebert (1854–1923)
- Siebold – Philipp Franz von Siebold (1796–1866)
- Siegerist – Emily Steffan Siegerist (1925–2014)
- Siegler – David Stanley Seigler (born 1940)
- Siehe – Walter Siehe (1859–1928)
- Sierra – Eugeni Sierra (1919–1999)
- Siev. – Johann August Carl Sievers (1762–1795)
- Silba – John Silba (1961–2015)
- Sillans – Roger Sillans (fl. 1952)
- Silliman – Benjamin Silliman (1779–1864)
- Silva Manso – António Luiz Patricio da Silva Manso (1788–1848)
- Silverst. – Philip Arthur Silverstone-Sopkin (1939–2018)
- Sim – Thomas Robertson Sim (1856–1938)
- Sim.-Bianch. – Rosangela Simão-Bianchini (fl. 1997)
- Simmonds – Joseph Henry Simmonds (1845–1936)
- Simon – Eugène Simon (1848–1924)
- Simonet – Marc Simonet (1899–1965)
- Simon-Louis – Leon L. Simon-Louis (1834–1913)
- Simpson – Charles Torrey Simpson (1826–1932)
- Sims – John Sims (1749–1831)
- Sinclair – Sir John Sinclair, 1st Baronet (1754–1835)
- Singer – Rolf Singer (1906–1994)
- Sinnott – Edmund Ware Sinnott (1888–1968)
- Sint. – Paul Ernst Emil Sintenis (1847–1907)
- Sirisena – Udani M. Sirisena (fl. 2009)
- Širj. — Grigorij Ivanović Širjaev (1882–1954)
- Sivad. – Mayandy Sivadasan (born 1948)
- S.J.Chen – Sen Jen Chen (born 1933)
- S.J.Cheng – Shi Jun Cheng (fl. 1980)
- S.J.Davies – Stuart James Davies (born 1964)
- S.J.Dillon – Steven J. Dillon (fl. 2011)
- S.Jenn. – Samuel Jennings (fl. 1875)
- S.J.Hao – Si Jun Hao (born 1965)
- S.J.Patrick – Susan J. Patrick (fl. 1993)
- S.Julia – Julia Sang (fl. 1998)
- S.J.van Leeuwen – Stephen J. van Leeuwen (born 1962)
- S.J.Zeng – Song Jun Zeng (fl. 2010)
- S.J.Zhu – Shi Jie Zhu (fl. 2008)
- Skan – Sidney Alfred Skan (1870–1939)
- S.K.Chen – Shu Kun Chen (born 1936)
- Skean – James Dan Skean (born 1958)
- Skeels – Homer Collar Skeels (1873–1934)
- S.Kelso – Sylvia Kelso (1953–2016)
- S.Kim – Sangtae Kim (born 1967)
- Skipwith – Geoffrey R. Skipwith (fl. 1929)
- S.K.Lee – Shu Kang Lee (born 1915)
- S.K.Mukerji – Sushil Kumar Mukerji (1896–1934)
- S.Knapp – Sandra Diane Knapp (born 1956)
- S.Koehler – Samantha Koehler (born 1975)
- Škorničk. – Jana Škorničkova (born 1975)
- Skottsb. – Carl Johan Fredrik Skottsberg (1880–1963)
- Skov – Flemming Skov (born 1958)
- Skovst. – Aage Thorsen Skovsted (1903-1983)
- Škubla – Pavol Škubla (fl. 2000))
- S.Kuros. – Sachiko Kurosawa (1927–2011)
- Skutch – Alexander Skutch (1904–2004)
- Skvarla – John Jerome Skvarla (1935–2014)
- S.K.Wu – Su Kung Wu (1935–2013)
- S.K.Yu – Sheng Kun Yu (fl. 2013)
- Slavin – Bernard Henry Slavin (1873–1960)
- S.L.Clark – Stephen L. Clark (born 1940)
- S.Lee – Sangtae Lee (born 1944)
- Slee – Andrew Vernon Slee (1950-2022)
- Sleumer – Hermann Otto Sleumer (1906–1993)
- Sloane – Hans Sloane (1660–1753)
- Slogt. — Egbertus van Slogteren (1888–1968)
- Slooten – Dirk Fok van Slooten (1891–1953)
- Slovák – Marek Slovák (fl. 2023)
- S.L.Welsh – Stanley Larson Welsh (born 1928)
- S.L.Yang – Si Lin Yang (fl. 1996)
- S.L.Zhang – Shi Liang Zhang (born 1931)
- Sm. – James Edward Smith (1759–1828)
- Small – John Kunkel Small (1869–1938)
- Smalley – Eugene Byron Smalley (1926–2002)
- S.M.Baker – Sarah Martha Baker (1887–1917)
- S.McPherson – Stewart R. McPherson (born 1983)
- S.M.Douglas – S.M. Douglas (fl. 2009)
- Smedmark – Jenny E.E. Smedmark (fl. 2006)
- Smirnova – Zoë Nikolayevna Smirnova (1898–1979)
- Smissen– Rob D. Smissen (fl. 2013)
- S.Misra – Sarat Misra (born 1943)
- Smit – J. Smit (fl. 1934)
- S.Moore – Spencer Le Marchant Moore (1850–1931)
- S.M.Reddy – Solipuram Madhusudhan Reddy (born 1940)
- S.M.R.Leopold – Leopold III, S. M. Roi (1901–1983)
- S.Murug. – S. Murugesan (fl. 2009)
- Smuts – Jan Christiaan Smuts (1870–1950)
- Smyth – Bernard Bryan Smyth (1843–1913)
- S.N.Biswas – Samarendra Nath Biswas (1939–2005)
- Sneath – Peter Henry Andrews Sneath (1923–2011)
- Snelling – Lilian Snelling (1879–1972)
- S.N.Hegde – S.N. Hegde (fl. 1981)
- Snijman – Dierdré A. Snijman (born 1948)
- S.Nilsson – Siwert Nilsson (1933–2002)
- Snyder – Leon Carleton Snyder (1908–1987)
- Sobol. – Gregor Fedorovitch Sobolewsky (1741–1807)
- Sobral – Marcos Sobral (born 1960)
- Soderstr. – Thomas Robert Soderstrom (1936–1987)
- Sodiro – Luis Sodiro (1836–1909)
- Soegeng – Wertit Soegeng-Reksodihardjo (born 1935)
- Soejarto – Djaja Djendoel Soejarto (born 1939)
- Soepadmo – Engkik Soepadmo (1937–2021)
- Soest – Johannes Leendert van Soest (1898–1983)
- S.O.Ford – Sibille Ormston Ford (fl. 1906)
- S.O.Grose – Susan Oviatt Grose (born 1974)
- Sohmer – Seymour Hans Sohmer (born 1941)
- Soják – Jiří Soják (1936–2012)
- S.Okamura – Shûtai Okamura (1877–1947)
- Sol. – Daniel Solander (1733–1782)
- Solbrig – Otto Thomas Solbrig (1930–2023)
- Sole – William Sole (1741–1802)
- Soleirol – Joseph François Soleirol (1781–1863)
- Soler. – Hans Solereder (1860–1920)
- Solms – Hermann Maximilian Carl Ludwig Friedrich zu Solms-Laubach (1842–1915)
- Solomon – James C. Solomon (born 1952)
- Soltis – Douglas E. Soltis (born 1958)
- Sommerf. – Søren Christian Sommerfelt (1794–1838)
- Sond. – Otto Wilhelm Sonder (1812–1881)
- Songeon – André Songeon (1826–1905)
- Sonn. – Pierre Sonnerat (1748–1814)
- Sonnini – Charles-Nicolas-Sigisbert Sonnini de Manoncourt (1751–1812)
- Soó – Károly Rezső Soó von Bere (1903–1980)
- Sopp (also Johan-Olsen) – Olav Johan Sopp (1860–1931)
- S.Ortiz – Santiago Ortiz Núñez (born 1957)
- Sosn. – Dmitrii Ivanovich Sosnowsky (1886–1952)
- Sothers – Cynthia Sothers (born 1963)
- Soulié – Joseph Auguste Soulié (1868–1930)
- Souster – John Eustace Sirett Souster (1912–)
- Southw. – Effie A. Southworth (1860–1947)
- Sowerby – James Sowerby (1757–1822)
- Sowter – Frederick Archibald Sowter (1899–1972)
- Soyaux – Hermann Soyaux (1852–1928)
- Spach – Édouard Spach (1801–1879)
- Spalding – Volney Morgan Spalding (1849–1918)
- Span. – Johan Baptist Spanoghe (1798–1838)
- Sparrm. – Anders Sparrman (1748–1820)
- Späth – Franz Ludwig Späth (1838–1913)
- S.P.Chen – Shi Pin Chen (fl. 2014)
- S.P.Churchill – Steven Paul Churchill (1948–2023)
- S.P.Darwin – Steven P. Darwin (born 1949)
- Specht – Raymond Specht (1924–2021)
- Speg. – Carlo Luigi (Carlos Luis) Spegazzini (1858–1926)
- Spellenb. – Richard Spellenberg (born 1940)
- Spenn. – Fridolin Karl Leopold Spenner (1798–1841)
- Speta – Franz Speta (1941–2015)
- Spicer – William Webb Spicer (1820–1879)
- S.Pierce – Simon Pierce (born 1974)
- Spillman – William Jasper Spillman (1863–1931)
- Spitzn. – Wenzel (Václav) Spitzner (1852–1907)
- Spix – Johann Baptist Ritter von Spix (1781–1826)
- S.P.Lyon – Stephanie Pimm Lyon (fl. 2016)
- Sprague – Thomas Archibald Sprague (1877–1958)
- Spreng. – Curt Polycarp Joachim Sprengel (1766–1833)
- Spring – Antoine Frédéric Spring (1814–1872)
- Spruce – Richard Spruce (1817–1893)
- Spruner – Wilhelm von Spruner (1805–1874)
- S.Q.Cai – Shao Qing Cai (fl. 2003)
- S.Q.Tong – Shao Quan Tong (born 1935)
- Squivet – Joseph Squivet de Carondelet (1878–1966)
- S.R.Barrett – Sarah R. Barrett (fl. 2016)
- Sreek. – Puthenpurayil Viswanathan Sreekumar (born 1954)
- Sreem. – C. P. Sreemadhavan (fl. 1965–1977)
- S.R.Jones – Sandra Raelene Jones (born 1969)
- S.R.Ramesh – S. R. Ramesh (fl. 1986)
- S.R.Yadav – Shrirang Ramchandra Yadav (born 1954)
- S.S.Chang – Siu Shih Chang (born 1918)
- S.Schauer – Sebastian Schauer (fl. 1847)
- S.S.Chien – Sung Shu Chien (1883–1965)
- S.S.Hooper – Sheila Spenser Hooper (1925–2022)
- S.S.Jain – S.S. Jain (born 1952)
- S.S.Larsen – Supee Saksuwan Larsen (born 1939)
- S.S.Renner – Susanne Sabine Renner (born 1954)
- S.Stokes – Susan Gabriella Stokes (1868–1954)
- S.Suárez – Stella Suárez (fl. 2000)
- S.Suzuki – Shizuo Suzuki (fl. 1962)
- S.S.Ying – Shao Shun Ying (fl. 1970)
- Stace – Clive Anthony Stace (born 1938)
- Stackh. – John Stackhouse (1742–1819)
- Stafleu – Frans Antonie Stafleu (1921–1997)
- Stajsic – V. Stajsic (fl. 2000)
- St.-Amans – Jean Florimond Boudon de Saint-Amans (1748–1831)
- Standl. – Paul Carpenter Standley (1884–1963)
- Stanger – William Stanger (surveyor) (1811–1854)
- Stanley – Trevor Donald Stanley (born 1952)
- Stannard – Brian Leslie Stannard (1944–2022)
- Stansb. – Howard Stansbury (1806–1863)
- Stapf – Otto Stapf (1857–1933)
- Staples – George William Staples (born 1953)
- Staszk. – Jerzy Staszkiewicz (born 1929)
- Staudt – Günter Staudt (1926–2008)
- S.T.Blake – Stanley Thatcher Blake (1910–1973)
- St.Cloud – Stanley F. Goessling-St Cloud (fl. 1950s)
- Stearn – William Thomas Stearn (1911–2001)
- Stebbing – Edward Percy Stebbing (1872–1960)
- Stebbins – George Ledyard Stebbins (1906–2000)
- Stebler – Friedrich Gottlieb Stebler (1852–1935)
- Stedman – John Gabriel Stedman (1744–1797)
- Steedman – Ellen Constance Steedman (1859–1949)
- Steenis – Cornelis Gijsbert Gerrit Jan van Steenis (1901–1986)
- Steentoft – Margaret Steentoft (born 1927)
- Steere – William Campbell Steere (1907–1989)
- Steetz – Joachim Steetz (1804–1862)
- Stehmann – João Renato Stehmann (born 1962)
- Stein – Berthold Stein (1847–1899)
- Steinh. – Adolph Steinheil (1810–1839)
- Stelfox – Arthur Wilson Stelfox (1883–1972)
- Steller – Georg Wilhelm Steller (1709–1746)
- Stenroos - Kaarlo Eemeli Kivirikko born Karl Emil Stenroos (1870–1947)
- Stent – Sydney Margaret Stent (1875–1942)
- Steph. – Franz Stephani (1842–1927)
- Stephan – Christian Friedrich Stephan (1757–1814)
- Štěpánek – Jan Štěpánek (born 1955)
- Sterba – Günther Sterba (born 1922)
- Stern – Frederick Claude Stern (1884–1967)
- Sternb. – Kaspar Maria von Sternberg (1761–1838)
- Sterns – Emerson Ellick Sterns (1846–1926)
- Steud. – Ernst Gottlieb von Steudel (1783–1856)
- Stev. (alt. Steven) – see Christian von Steven
- Stevels – J.M.C. Stevels (fl. 1988)
- Steven (alt. Stev.) – Christian von Steven (1781–1863)
- Steward – Albert Newton Steward (1897–1959)
- Steyerm. – Julian Alfred Steyermark (1909–1988)
- St George – Ian Michael St George (born 1941)
- Stiefelh. – Heinz Stiefelhagen (1887–1946)
- Stiehler – August Wilhelm Stiehler (1797–1878)
- Stierst. – Christian Stierstorfer (born 1969)
- Stiles – Charles Wardell Stiles (1867–1933 or 1941)
- Still. – Benjamin Stillingfleet (1702–1771)
- Stimpson – Margaret L. Stimpson (born 1954)
- Stimson – William R. Stimson (fl. 1970)
- Stirt. – James Stirton (1833–1917)
- S.T.Kim – Sang-Tae Kim (born 1971)
- St.-Lag. – Jean Baptiste Saint-Lager (1825–1912)
- Stock – A. Dean Stock (fl. 2014)
- Stockdale – Phyllis Margaret Stockdale (1927–1989)
- Stocker – Otto Stocker (1888–1979)
- Stockey – Ruth A. Stockey (fl. 1998)
- Stocking – Kenneth Morgan Stocking (1911–2008)
- Stockm. – Siegfried Stockmayer (1868–1933)
- Stockmans – François Stockmans (1904–1986)
- Stocks – John Ellerton Stocks (1822–1854)
- Stockw. – William Palmer Stockwell (1898–1950)
- Stoj. – Nikolai Andreev Stojanov (1883–1968)
- Stoker – Fred Stoker (1878–1943)
- Stokes – Jonathan S. Stokes (1755–1831)
- Stoliczka – Ferdinand Stoliczka (1838–1874)
- Stoneman – Bertha M. Stoneman (1866–1943)
- Stopes – Marie Charlotte Carmichael Stopes (1880–1958)
- Story – Robert Story (1913–1999)
- Stotler – Raymond Eugene Stotler (1940–2013)
- Strachan – Jeffrey L. Strachan (born 1956)
- Strähler – Adolf Strähler (1829–1897)
- Strasb. – Eduard Strasburger (1844–1912)
- Strausb. – Perry Daniel Strausbaugh (1886–1965)
- Straw – Richard Myron Straw (1926–2012)
- S.T.Reynolds – Sally T. Reynolds (born 1932)
- Strid – Arne Strid (born 1943)
- S.Tripathi – Sunil Tripathi (fl. 1999)
- Stritch – L.R.Stritch (fl. 1982)
- Strobl – Gabriel Strobl (1846–1925)
- Strutt – Jacob George Strutt (1790–1864)
- Struwe – Lena Struwe (born 1967)
- Stschegl. – Serge S. Stscheglejew (1820–1859)
- Stuart – John Stuart, 3rd Earl of Bute (or as John Stuart Bute) (1713–1792)
- Stuchlík – Jaroslav Stuchlík (1890–1967)
- Stud.-Steinh. – Bernhard Studer-Steinhäuslin (1847–1910)
- Stuessy – Tod Falor Stuessy (born 1943)
- Stuntz – Stephen Conrad Stuntz (1875–1918)
- Stur – Dionys Rudolf Josef Stur (1827–1893)
- Sturm – Jacob W. Sturm (1771–1848)
- Stutz – Howard Coombs Stutz (1918–2010)
- St.-Yves – Alfred (Marie Augustine) Saint-Yves (1855–1933)
- Suckow – Georg Adolf (Adolph) Suckow (1751–1813)
- Sucre – Dimitri Sucre Benjamin (fl. 1962)
- Suddee – Somran Suddee (fl. 2004)
- Sudre – Henri L. Sudre (1862–1918)
- Sudw. – George Bishop Sudworth (1864–1927)
- Suess. – Karl Suessenguth (1893–1955)
- Suetsugu – Kenji Suetsugu (fl. 2012)
- Suffrian – Christian Wilhelm Ludwig Eduard Suffrian (1805–1876)
- Sugau – John B. Sugau (fl. 1994)
- Sugim. – Junichi Sugimoto (1901–1988)
- Sukaczev – Vladimir Nikolayevich Sukachev (Nikolajevich Sukaczev) (1880–1967)
- Sukhor. – Alexander Petrovich Sukhorukov (born 1967)
- Suksathan – Piyakaset Suksathan (born 1960)
- Suksd. – Wilhelm Nikolaus Suksdorf (1850–1932)
- Suleiman – Monica Suleiman (fl. 2013)
- Sull. – William Starling Sullivant (1803–1873)
- Sümbül – Hüseyin Sümbül (born 1955)
- Summerb. – Richard Summerbell (born 1956)
- Summerh. – Victor Samuel Summerhayes (1897–1974)
- Sumnev. – Georgji Prokopievič Sumnevicz (1909–1947)
- Sünd. – Franz Sündermann (1864–1946)
- Sunding – Per Øgle Sunding (born 1937)
- Surian – Joseph Donat Surian (died 1691)
- Suringar – Willem Frederik Reinier Suringar (1832–1898)
- Susanna – Alfonso Susanna (born 1955) (also Alfonso Susanna de la Serna)
- Suslova – T. A. Suslova (born 1944)
- Sutar – Shrikant Sutar (fl. 2013)
- Suter – Johann Rudolf Suter (1766–1827)
- Sutherl. – James Sutherland (c. 1639–1719)
- Sutt. – Charles Sutton (1756–1846)
- Sved. – Nils (Eberhard) Svedelius (1873–1960)
- Svenson – Henry Knute Svenson (1897–1986)
- Svent. – Eric R. Svensson Sventenius (1910–1973)
- S.Vidal – Sebastian Vidal (1842–1889)
- Sw. – Olof Peter Swartz (1760–1818)
- Swainson – William Swainson (1789–1855)
- Swallen – Jason Richard Swallen (1903–1991)
- S.Waller – S. Waller (fl. 1951)
- Swanepoel – Wessel Swanepoel (born 1957)
- S.Ware – Stewart Ware (fl. 1967)
- S.W.Arnell – Sigfrid Wilhelm Arnell (1895–1970)
- S.Watson – Sereno Watson (1826–1892)
- Sweet – Robert Sweet (1783–1835)
- Swenson – Ulf Swenson (born 1959)
- Swezey – Goodwin Deloss Swezey (1851–1934)
- Swingle – Walter Tennyson Swingle (1871–1952)
- S.W.Jeffrey – Shirley Winifred Jeffrey (1930–2014)
- S.W.L.Jacobs – Surrey Wilfrid Laurance Jacobs (1946–2009)
- S.W.Seo – Seon Won Seo Seo (fl. 2022)
- S.X.Zhu – Shi Xin Zhu (fl. 2008)
- S.Y.Bao – Shi Ying Bao (born 1935)
- Syd. – Hans Sydow (1879–1946) (son of Paul Sydow)
- S.Y.Dong – Shi Yong Dong (fl. 2001)
- S.Y.Hu – Shiu-Ying Hu (1910–2012)
- S.W.Chung – Shih Wen Chung (fl. 1998)
- S.W.Liu – Shang Wu Liu (born 1934)
- S.Wright – Stephen Henry Wright (born 1976)
- Syme – John Thomas Irvine Boswell Syme (1822–1888)
- S.Y.Meng – Shi Yong Meng (fl. 2011)
- Symington – Colin Fraser Symington (1905–1943)
- Symon – David Eric Symon (1920–2011)
- Symons – Jelinger Symons (1778–1851)
- S.Y.Sm. – Selena Y. Smith (fl. 2004)
- S.Y.Wang – Sui-Yi Wang (born 1934)
- S.Y.Wong – Sin Yeng Wong (born 1975)
- Szabó – Zoltán von Szabó (1882–1944)
- S.Z.He – Shun Zhi He (fl. 1992)
- S.Zhou – Shan Zhou (fl. 2020)
- S.Zhu – Shu Zhu (fl. 2003)
- S.Z.Huang – Se Zei Huang (fl. 1980s)
- Szlach. – Dariusz Szlachetko (born 1961)
- Szyszył. – Ignaz von Szyszyłowicz (1857–1910)

== T–Z ==
Contents: Top	A	B	C	D	E F	G	H	I J	K L	M	N O	P	Q R	S	T U V	W X Y Z

To find entries for T–Z, use the table of contents above.

== See also ==
- List of South African plant botanical authors
- List of botanists
- Category:Botanists
- List of Russian botanists
- List of zoologists by author abbreviation
