= Alexander Braun =

German botanist (1805-1877)

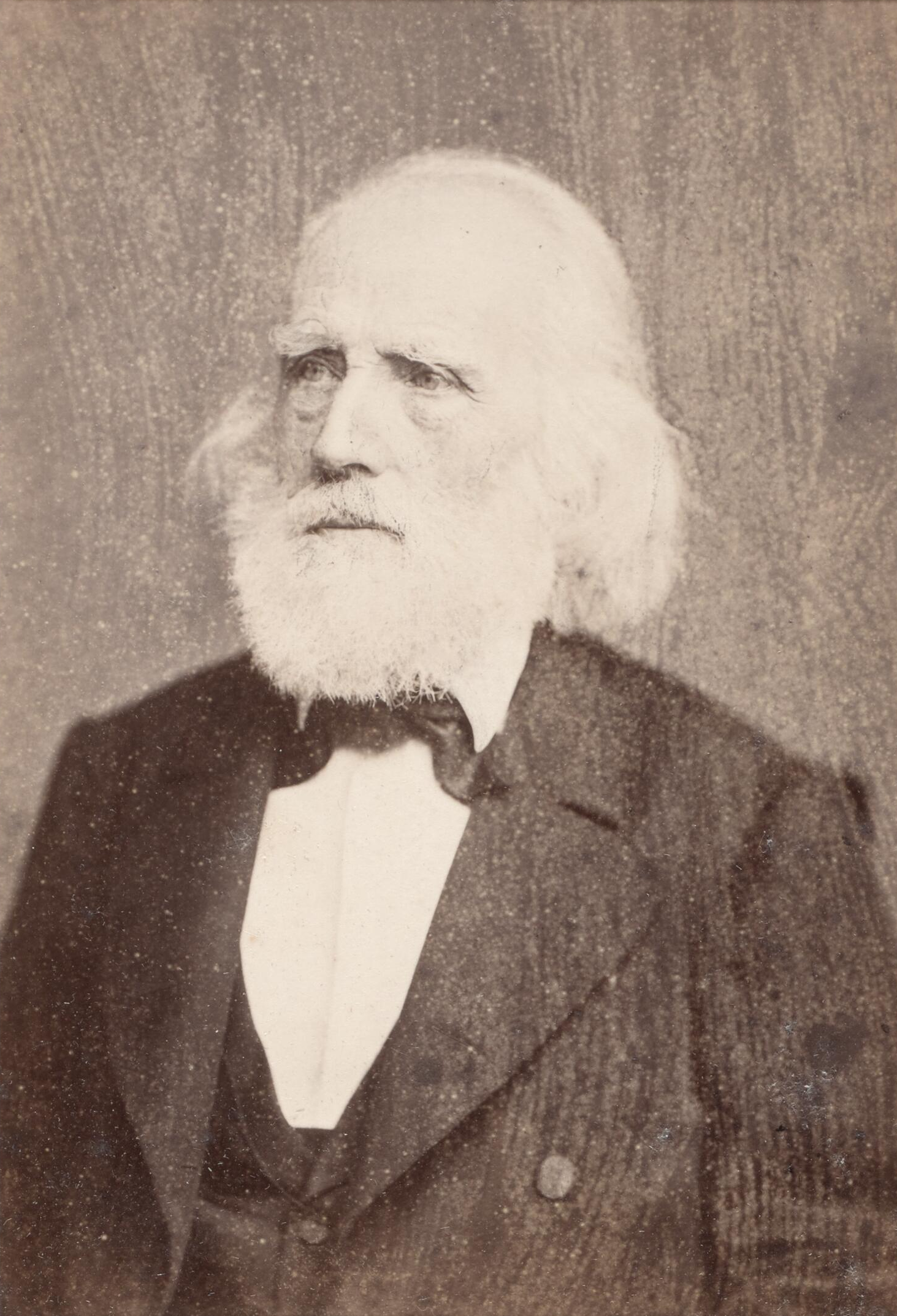
- Alexander Braun in 1876
- Born: 10 May 1805; Regensburg
- Died: 29 March 1877 (aged 71)
- Known for: morphology
- Scientific career
- Fields: botany
- Workplaces: Freiburg; Giessen; University of Berlin
- Author abbrev. (botany): A.Braun

Alexander Carl Heinrich Braun (10 May 1805 – 29 March 1877) was a German botanist from Regensburg, Bavaria. His research centered on the morphology of plants and was a very influential teacher who worked as a professor of botany at the universities of Freiburg, Giessen, and Berlin at various times. He was also the director of the Berlin Botanical Garden.

== Biography ==
Braun was born in Regensburg (Ratisbon) where his father Alexander was a tax inspector in the postal department. His mother Henriette was the daughter of a priest and mathematics professor. He studied at Karlsruhe and Freiburg (Breisgau) where his father was transferred. He went to the University of Heidelberg to study medicine. His teachers included Gottlieb Wilhelm Bischoff, Johann Heinrich Dierbach and Franz Joseph Schelver. At Heidelberg he studied with Louis Agassiz, Carl Schimper and George Engelmann. Agassiz would marry Braun's sister Cecilie while Schimper was engaged briefly to Braun's sister Emilie. He completed his studies at Paris and Munich. In 1833 he began teaching botany at the Polytechnic School of Karlsruhe, staying there until 1846. Afterwards he was a professor of botany in Freiburg (from 1846), Giessen (from 1850) and at the University of Berlin (1851), where he remained until 1877. While in Berlin, he was also director of the botanical garden. He designed the layout which was later documented by Paul Friedrich August Ascherson. In 1852, he was elected a foreign member of the Royal Swedish Academy of Sciences. With Gottlob Ludwig Rabenhorst (1806–1881) and Ernst Stizenberger (1827–1895), he was editor of the exsiccata series Die Characeen Europa's in getrockneten Exemplaren, unter Mitwirkung mehrerer Freunde der Botanik, gesammelt und herausgegeben von Prof. A. Braun, L. Rabenhorst und E. Stizenberger.

Braun is largely known for his research involving plant morphology. He accepted evolution but was a critic of Darwinism. He was a proponent of vitalism, a popular 19th-century speculative theory that claimed that a regulative force existed within living matter in order to maintain functionality. Braun made important contributions in the field of cell theory. His students included August Wilhelm Eichler.

From his 1830s analysis of the arrangement of scales on a pine cone he was a pioneer of mathematical phyllotaxis developing what is called the Schimper-Braun theory.

In 1877, Wilhelm Philippe Schimper and Philipp Bruch named the plant genus Braunia in his honor. Also, a decorative plant known as "Braun's holly fern" (Polystichum braunii) commemorates his name.

== Published works ==
- 1831: Untersuchung über die Ordnung der Schuppen an den Tannenzapfen (Investigation on the order of shapes in pine cones).
- 1842: Nachträgliche Mitteilungen über die Gattungen Marsilia und Pilularia (Additional releases on the genera Marsilea and Pilularia).
- 1851: Betrachtungen über die Erscheinung der Verjüngung in der Natur, insbesondere in der Lebens- und Bildungsgeschichte der Pflanze (Leipzig, 198 pp.) (Reflections on the phenomenon of rejuvenation in nature, particularly in the life and developmental history of the plant).
- 1852: Über die Richtungsverhältnisse der Saftströme in den Zellen der Characeen. (on directional conditions involving juice flow in the cell of Characeae).
- 1853: Das Individuum der Pflanze in seinem Verhältnis zur Spezies etc. (The individual plant in its relation to species, etc.).
- 1854: Über den schiefen Verlauf der Holzfaser und die dadurch bedingte Drehung der Stämme
- 1854: Über einige neue und weniger bekannte Krankheiten der Pflanzen, welche durch Pilze erzeugt werden (On new and lesser-known diseases of plants produced by fungi).
- 1854: Das Individuum der Species in seinem Verhältnis zur Pflanze (The individual of the species in its relationship to the plant).
- 1855: "Algarum unicellularium genera nova et minus cognita".
- 1856: Über Chytridium, eine Gattung einzelliger Schmarotzergewächse auf Algen und Infusorien (On Chytridium, a genus of unicellular parasites on algae and infusoria).
- 1857: Über Parthenogenesis bei Pflanzen (On parthenogenesis in plants)
- 1860: Über Polyembryonie und Keimung von Caelebogyne (Polyembryony and germination of Caelebogyne).
- 1861: Index seminum Horti Botanici Berolinensis: Appendix Plantarum Novrum et minus cognitarum quea in Horto region botanico Berolinensi coluntur.
- 1862: Über die Bedeutung der Morphologie (On the importance of morphology).
- 1862: Zwei deutsche Isoetesarten (Two German Isoëtes species).
- 1863: Über Isoetes (On quillworts).
- 1865: Beitrag zur Kenntnis der Gattung Selaginella (Contribution to the knowledge of the genus Selaginella).
- 1867: Die Characeen Afrikas (African Characeae).
- 1867: "Conspectus systematicus Characearum europaearum".
- 1870: Neuere Untersuchungen über die Gattungen Marsilia und Pilularia (Recent studies on the genera Marsilea and Pilularia).
- 1872: Über die Bedeutung der Entwicklung in der Naturgeschichte (On the importance of development in natural history).

== See also ==
- University of Freiburg Faculty of Biology
