= Jelinger Symons =

Jelinger Symons may refer to:

- Jelinger Symons (botanist) (1778–1851), Anglican rector and amateur botanist
- Jelinger Cookson Symons (1809–1860), English barrister, school inspector and writer
