= Schneck =

Schneck (German and Jewish (Ashkenazic): affectionate nickname for a slow person or for a slow or indolent worker from Middle High German snecke German Schneck(e) Yiddish shnek "snail") is a German and Ashkenazi Jewish surname.

== Geographical distribution ==
As of 2014, 46.8% of all known bearers of the surname Schneck were residents of Germany (frequency 1:19,938), 40.2% of the United States (1:104,468), 4.1% of Brazil (1:577,718), 3.2% of Austria (1:31,074), 1.0% of England (1:639,077) and 1.0% of France (1:811,068).

In Germany, the frequency of the surname was higher than national average (1:19,938) in the following states:

1. Baden-Württemberg (1:6,022)
2. Bavaria (1:12,255)
3. Rhineland-Palatinate (1:13,696)

== People ==
- Attilio Schneck (born 1946), Italian politician
- Dave Schneck (born 1949), American baseball player
- Jacob Schneck (1843 – 1906), American physician and botanist
- Mike Schneck (born 1977), American football player
- Phyllis Schneck, American computer scientist
- Robert Damon Schneck, American writer
- Stephen F. Schneck (born 1953), American Catholic activist
