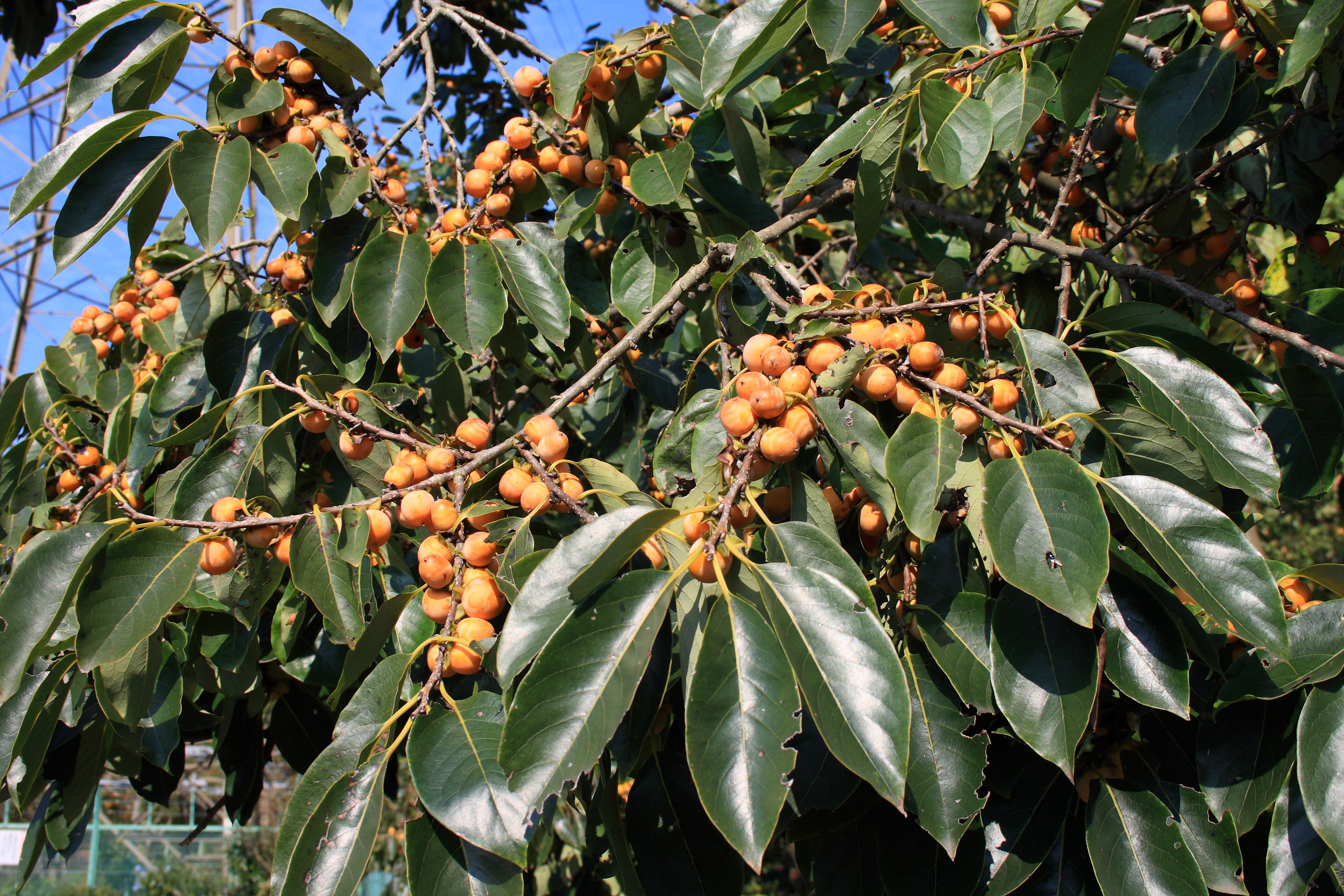
- Branches with fruit

Conservation status
- Least Concern (IUCN 3.1)

Scientific classification
- Kingdom: Plantae
- Clade: Tracheophytes
- Clade: Angiosperms
- Clade: Eudicots
- Clade: Asterids
- Order: Ericales
- Family: Ebenaceae
- Genus: Diospyros
- Species: D. lotus

Binomial name
- Diospyros lotus L.

Synonyms
- 11 Synonyms: Dactylus trapezuntinus Forssk. (1775); Diospyros calycina Dippel (1889); D. lotus var. angustifolia Gaudin (1830); D. lotus f. ellipsoidea Makino (1912); D. lotus f. globosa Makino (1912); D. lotus var. laevis H.Ohba & S.Akiyama (2016); D. lotus f. longifolia Zhang (1983); D. lotus var. mollissima C.Y.Wu (1965); D. lotus f. ovoidea Makino (1912); D. mediterranea Oken (1841); D. umlovok Griff. (1848)

= Date-plum =

Species of tree

The date-plum (Diospyros lotus), also known by the common names Caucasian persimmon and lilac persimmon, is a widely cultivated species of the genus Diospyros, native to Eurasia. The ripe fruit is edible.

== Description ==
This is a tree growing to 15–30 metres (49–98 feet) tall, but commonly stopping at 15 m (49 ft), spreading in a horizontal direction as it matures. The bark flakes off as it ages.

The leaves are shiny, leathery, oval-shaped with pointed ends, 5–15 cm (2–6 in) long and 3–6 cm (1 1/4–2 1/4 in) wide.

Appearing in June to July, the flowers are small and greenish. The plant is dioecious, and thus self-incompatible.

The fruits are berries with juicy flesh, yellow when ripe, and 1–2 cm (1/2–3/4 in) in diameter. The seeds have thin skin and a very hard endosperm. The fruits ripen from October to November.

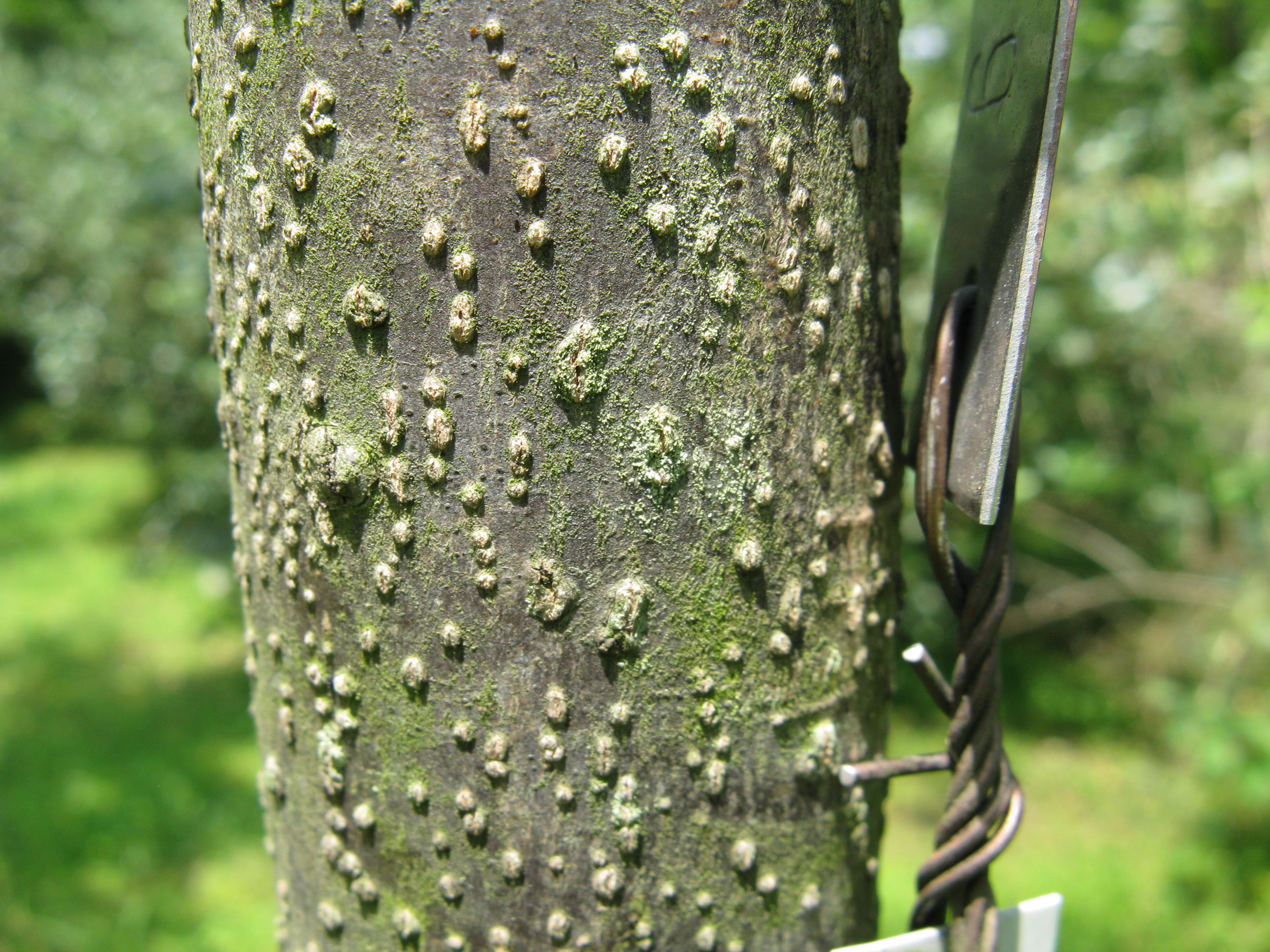
Trunk

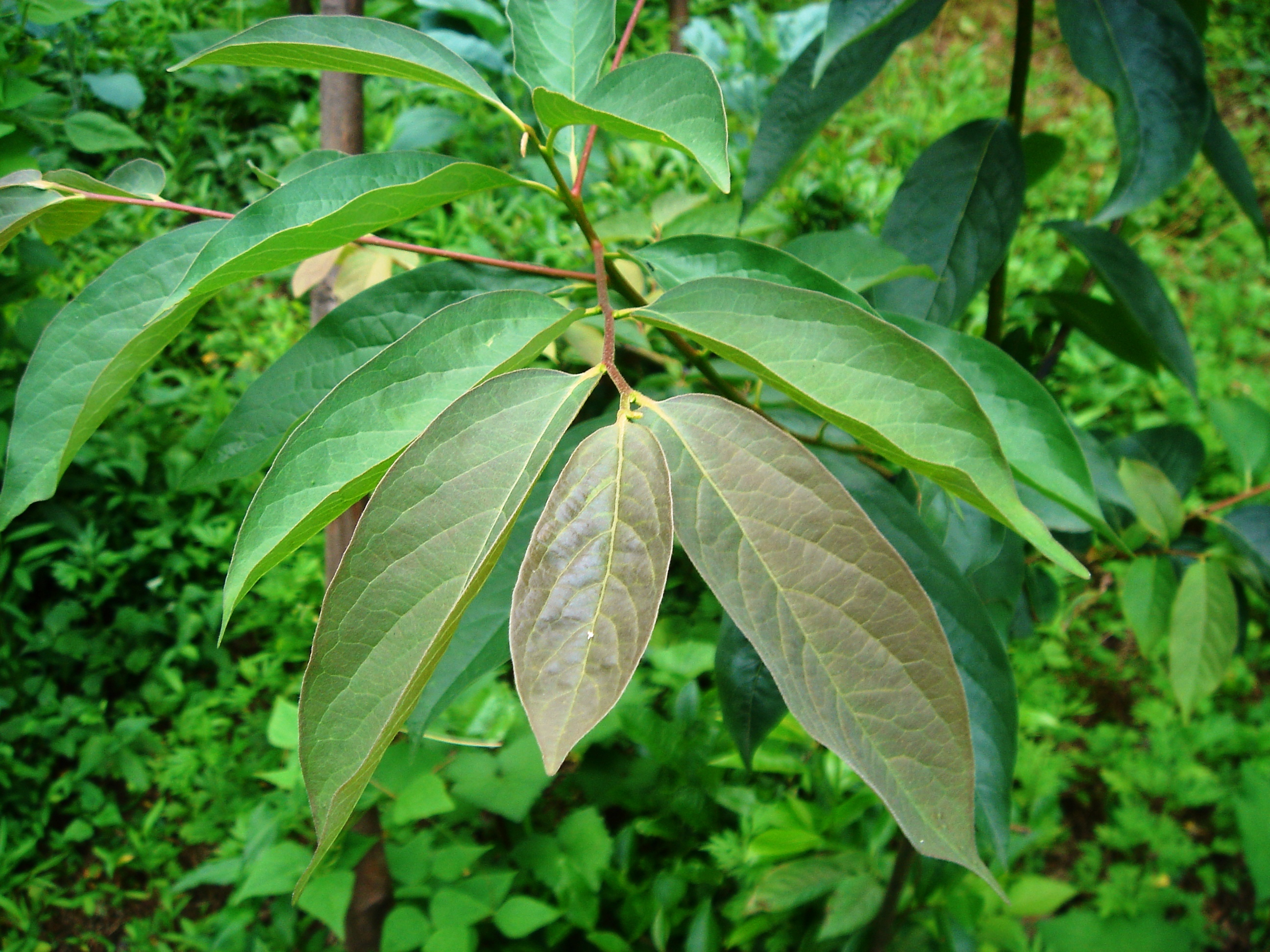
Leaves

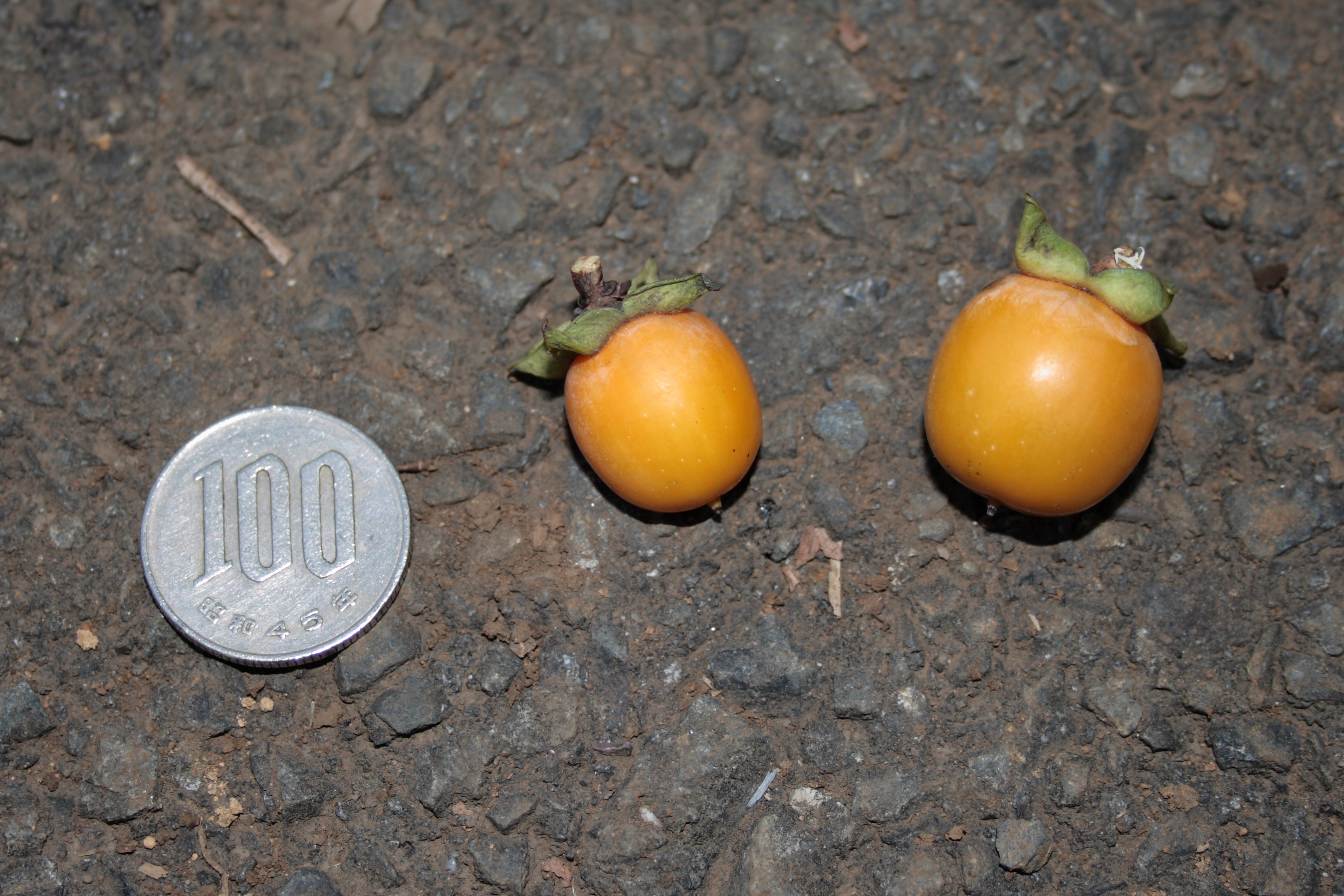
Fruit

== Etymology ==
The plant was known to the ancient Greeks as "God's fruit" (Διός πυρός, Diós purós), hence the scientific name of the genus.

Its English common name probably derives from Persian Khormaloo خرمالو literally "date-plum", referring to the taste of this fruit which is reminiscent of both plums and dates. The fruit is called Amlok املوک in Pakistan and consumed dried.

== Distribution and habitat ==
The species area extends from East Asia to the west of the Mediterranean, down to Spain. The date-plum is native to southeast Europe and southwest Asia.

The tree grows in the lower and middle mountain zones in the Caucasus. They usually grow up to 600 m (2,000 ft) above sea level. In Central Asia, it rises higher—up to 2,000 m (6,600 ft). They rarely grow in stands but often grow with hackberry, ash, maple and other deciduous species. It is not demanding on the soil and can grow on rocky slopes but requires a well lit environment.

It is cultivated at the limits of its range, as well as in the U.S. and North Africa.

== Uses ==
The fruits are edible and have a rich flavour, but only when fully ripe, aided by frost. They should be picked as late as possible (around late November) and stored in a cool place, where they will continue to ripen over a couple of months. In December, fruit should be picked only for immediate consumption, as they will not keep in storage.

The fruits are plentiful in sugar, malic acid, and vitamins. They are often dried, also helping destroy tartness.
