= Mukerji =

Mukerji is a surname. Notable persons with this name include:

- Asoke Kumar Mukerji (born 1955), Indian diplomat and writer
- Dhan Gopal Mukerji, Indian writer
- Raj Mukerji, New Jersey lobbyist, political consultant and entrepreneur
- Rani Mukerji, Bollywood actress
- Sushil Kumar Mukerji (1896–1934), Indian botanist

== See also ==
- Mukherjee, popular Bengali surname, alternate spelling
