= Savign. =

Savign. may refer to:

- Francesco Savignone, botanist with the standard authority abbreviation Savign.
- Marie Jules César Savigny, botanist with the standard authority abbreviation Savigny
