= Sudre =

Sudre may refer to:

== Surname ==
- François Sudre (1787–1862), French violinist, composer and music teacher who invented a musical language called la Langue musicale universelle, or Solrésol
- François Sudre (1844–1912), inventor of the sudrophone
- Henri L. Sudre (1862–1918), French botanist
- Jean-Pierre Sudre (1921–1997), French commercial photographer
- Margie Sudre (born 1943), Vietnam-born French politician
- Raymond Sudre (1870–1962), French sculptor

== Other ==
- Sedreh, a garment worn by Zoroastrians
