= Tylophoropsis =

Tylophoropsis is the scientific name of two genera of organisms and may refer to:

- Tylophoropsis (plant) N.E.Br. (1894), a genus of plants in the family Apocynaceae
- Tylophoropsis (lichen) Sambo (1938), a genus of fungi in the family Caliciaceae
