= Phylliscidiopsis =

Scientific classification
- Domain: Eukaryota
- Kingdom: Fungi
- Division: Ascomycota
- Class: Lichinomycetes
- Order: Lichinales
- Family: Lichinaceae
- Genus: Phylliscidiopsis
- Species: P. abissinica

Binomial name
- Phylliscidiopsis abissinica Sambo (1937)

Genus of lichen

Phylliscidiopsis is a genus of lichenized fungi in the family Lichinaceae. It is monotypic, containing the single species Phylliscidiopsis abissinica.
