= Ulmus changii var. changii =

Scientific classification
- Kingdom: Plantae
- Clade: Tracheophytes
- Clade: Angiosperms
- Clade: Eudicots
- Clade: Rosids
- Order: Rosales
- Family: Ulmaceae
- Genus: Ulmus
- Species: U. changii W. C. Cheng
- Variety: U. c. var. changii

Trinomial name
- Ulmus changii var. changii

Variety of tree

Ulmus changii var. changii is a variety of tree endemic to elevations of 200 m (660 ft) – 800 m (2,600 ft) in the Chinese provinces of Anhui, Fujian, Hubei, Hunan, Jiangsu, Jiangxi, Sichuan, and Zhejiang.

== Description ==
The variety is distinguished by Fu as having "Leaf blade adaxially glabrous or pubescent on veins. Flowers from floral buds on fascicled cymes. Flowers and fruits March–April".

== Cultivation ==
The tree is not known to be in cultivation beyond China.
