= Henri Nestlé =

German-Swiss businessman (1814–1890)

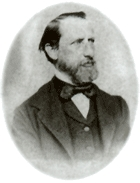
- Born: Heinrich Nestle; 10 August 1814; Frankfurt am Main, Free City of Frankfurt
- Died: 7 July 1890 (aged 75); Glion, Vaud, Switzerland
- Occupation: Confectioner
- Known for: Founder of Nestlé
- Spouse: Anna Clémentine Thérèse Ehemant (m. 1860)
- Children: Emma Delajoux (adopted)

Henri Nestlé (French: [ɑ̃ʁi nɛsle]; born Heinrich Nestle, German: [ˈhaɪnrɪç ˈnɛstlə]; 10 August 1814 – 7 July 1890) was a German-born Swiss confectioner and the founder of Nestlé, the world's largest food and beverage company.

== Early life ==
Henri Nestlé was born Heinrich Nestle on 10 August 1814 in Frankfurt am Main. He was the eleventh of fourteen children of Johann Ulrich Matthias Nestle and Anna Maria Catharina Ehemann. Nestle's father, by tradition, inherited the business of his father, Johann Ulrich Nestle, and became a glazier in Töngesgasse. The later Lord Mayor of Frankfurt am Main, Gustav Edmund Nestle, was his brother.

The Nestle family has its roots in western Swabia, predominantly in boroughs of the Black Forest such as Dornstetten, Freudenstadt, Mindersbach, Nagold, and Sulz am Neckar. In the Swabian dialect, "Nestle" is a small bird's nest. The name Nestle also has different variations, including Nästlin, Nästlen, Nestlin, Nestlen, and Niestle. Nestlé with é is a Frenchification of the German name, although Switzerland is 67% German-speaking.

The Nestle family tree began with three brothers (thus the three young birds in the nest being fed by their mother on the family coat of arms) from Mindersbach, called Hans, Heinrich, and Samuel Nestlin. The father of these three sons was born circa 1495. Hans, the eldest, was born in 1520 and had a son with the same name, who later became mayor of Nagold. His son Ulrich was a barber and his fifth son was the first glazier in the family. For over five generations, this profession was passed down from father to son. Additionally, the Nestles provided a number of mayors for the boroughs of Dornstetten, Freudenstadt, Nagold, and Sulz am Neckar.

== Career and new name ==
Before Nestle turned 20 in 1834, he completed a four-year apprenticeship with J. E. Stein, owner of a Frankfurt pharmacy. At some point between 1834 and 1839 he migrated, for reasons unknown, to Switzerland. At the end of 1839, he was officially authorized in Lausanne, Vaud, to perform chemical experiments, make up prescriptions, and sell medicines. During this time, he changed his name to Henri Nestlé in order to adapt better to the new social environment in French-speaking Vevey, where he eventually settled.

In 1843, Nestlé bought into one of the region's production of rapeseeds. He also became involved in the production of nut oils (used to fuel oil lamps), liqueurs, rum, absinthe, and vinegar. He also began manufacturing and selling carbonated mineral water and lemonade, although during the European food crisis in the 1840s, Nestlé gave up mineral water production. In 1857 he began concentrating on gas lighting and fertilizers.

Though it is not known when Nestlé started working on his infant formula project, by 1867, Nestlé had produced a viable powdered milk product. His interest is known to have been spurred by several factors. Although Nestlé and his wife were childless, they were aware of the high death rate among infants. Nestlé would have been aware of Justus von Liebig's work in developing an infant formula. In addition, fresh milk was not always available in large towns, and women in higher society were starting to view breastfeeding as an unfashionable option.

Nestlé combined cow's milk with grain and sugar to produce a substitute for breast milk. Moreover, he and his friend Jean Balthasar Schnetzler, a scientist in human nutrition, removed the acid and the starch in wheat flour because they were difficult for babies to digest. Initially called "kindermehl," or "children flour", his product had an advantage over Liebig's "soup for infants" in that it was much easier to prepare, needing only to be boiled prior to feeding, and it soon proved to be a viable option for infants who were unable to breastfeed. People quickly recognized the value of the new product, and soon Farine Lactée Henri Nestlé, "Henri Nestlé's Milk Flour" in French, was being sold in much of Europe. By the 1870s, Nestlé's Infant Food, made with malt, cow's milk, sugar, and wheat flour, was selling in the US for $0.50 a bottle.

Nestlé's milk-condensation process enabled the chocolatier Daniel Peter, of Vevey, to perfect his milk chocolate formulation in 1875, after seven years of effort, and the two men subsequently formed a partnership which resulted, four years later, in 1879, in the organisation of the Nestlé Company, which eventually became one of the largest Europe-based confection industries.

== Personal life ==
Nestlé and Anna Clémentine Thérèse Ehemant were married in Frankfurt, Germany on 23 May 1860. Nestlé sold his company in 1875 to his business associates and then lived with his family alternately in Montreux and Glion, where they helped people with small loans and publicly contributed towards improving the local infrastructure. In Glion, he moved into a house later known as Villa Nestlé.

Nestlé died in Glion on 7 July 1890.

== Sources ==
- Kaufmann, Jens Th.: "Familie Nestle aus Nagold und Mindersbach". In: Südwestdeutsche Blätter für Familien- Und Wappenkunde. Band 29, 2011, S. 26–46.
- Pfiffner, A.: Henri Nestlé: Vom Frankfurter Apothekergehilfen zum Schweizer Pionierunternehmer. Zürich, 1993
- Alex Capus: Patriarchen, Albrecht Knaus Verlag, München 2006. ISBN 3-8135-0273-2.
