= Ulmus changii var. kunmingensis =

Scientific classification
- Kingdom: Plantae
- Clade: Tracheophytes
- Clade: Angiosperms
- Clade: Eudicots
- Clade: Rosids
- Order: Rosales
- Family: Ulmaceae
- Genus: Ulmus
- Species: U. changii
- Variety: U. c. var. kunmingensis

Trinomial name
- Ulmus changii var. kunmingensis W. C. Cheng

Synonyms
- Ulmus kunmingensis W.C.Cheng

Variety of tree

Ulmus changii var. kunmingensis W. C. Cheng, occasionally referred to as the Kunming elm, is a Chinese tree endemic to montane forests at elevations of 600–1800 m in the provinces of Guangxi, Guizhou, Sichuan, and Yunnan.

== Description ==
The variety is distinguished by "branchlets occasionally with swelling and irregularly longitudinally fissured corky layers. Leaf blade abaxially with tufted hairs in the axil of the veins. Flowers on mixed buds, scattered in basal or sub-basal bract axils of young branches. Fl. and fr. same as for autonym variety but slightly earlier in season".

== Pests and diseases ==
No information available.

== Cultivation ==
The tree is not known to be in cultivation beyond China.
