= Tylophoropsis (lichen) =

Scientific classification
- Domain: Eukaryota
- Kingdom: Fungi
- Division: Ascomycota
- Class: Lecanoromycetes
- Order: Caliciales
- Family: Caliciaceae
- Genus: Tylophoropsis; Sambo (1938), illegitimate homonym, not Tylophoropsis N.E.Br. 1894 (Apocynaceae)
- Species: T. nyeriana

Binomial name
- Tylophoropsis nyeriana Sambo (1938)

Single-species genus of lichen-forming fungus

Tylophoropsis is a fungal genus in the family Caliciaceae, although the placement in this family is uncertain. This is a monotypic genus, containing the single species Tylophoropsis nyeriana, a lichen found in Africa.
