= Shirley Cotter Tucker =

American botanist and lichenologist

- Born: 1927 (age 98–99); Minnesota, U.S.
- Education: University of Minnesota; University of California, Davis
- Scientific career
- Fields: Botany lichenologist
- Workplaces: Louisiana State University

Shirley Cotter Tucker (born 1927) is an American botanist, lichenologist, and a former Boyd Professor of botany at Louisiana State University. The standard author abbreviation S.C.Tucker is used to indicate this person as the author when citing a botanical name.

== Biography ==
Shirley Cotter was born in Minnesota, United States, in 1927 to Ralph and Myra Cotter. Ralph Cotter was a plant pathologist at the University of Minnesota; growing up, Shirley Cotter would play in the university's greenhouses.

Cotter maintained her interest in botany as an undergraduate student at the University of Minnesota; during this time, she collected over 4000 herbarium specimens. Her collection emphasized lichens. In 1951, Cotter became a graduate student in botany at University of California, Davis, studying under Katherine Esau. During her graduate studies, Cotter met Kenneth Tucker. They married in 1953. Shirley Cotter Tucker earned her doctorate in botany in 1956. Her dissertation was titled Ontogeny of the Inflorescence and the Flower in Drimys winteri var. chilensis.

After graduating, Tucker had trouble finding permanent work at a university or college that would give her access to research funding. Instead, she sought external funding, receiving her first grant from the National Science Foundation in 1957. For 10 years, Tucker worked in temporary, non-tenure track university positions. She developed her work on lichens during this time, as a way around her lack of access to a laboratory.

In 1968, Tucker was hired as a tenure track assistant professor at Louisiana State University (LSU), where she taught botany. In 1982, she earned the rank of Boyd Professor, the highest distinction awarded by the LSU Board of Supervisors. Tucker was the president of the Botanical Society of America in 1987–88. She was also the president of the American Society of Plant Taxonomists.

Tucker and her husband both retired in 1995. They moved to Santa Barbara, California, and became involved with the Santa Barbara Botanic Garden, including establishing an endowment for a staff plant systematist. Tucker also taught part time at University of California, Santa Barbara. In 1999, the University of Minnesota honored Tucker with an Outstanding Achievement Award.

In 2014, Kenneth Tucker died. The next year Shirley Cotter Tucker made a gift to the Center for Plant Diversity, which named the fund the "Shirley and Kenneth Tucker Fund" in their honor. Also in 2015, the herbarium was christened "The Shirley C. Tucker Herbarium".
