= Jean Balthasar Schnetzler =

Swiss naturalist (1823–1896)

Johann Balthasar Schnetzler (3 November 1823 in Gächlingen – 29 June 1896 in Lausanne) was a Swiss naturalist.

In 1840/41, he studied at Polytechnic Stuttgart and, for a period of time, taught French classes at the Schaffhausen gymnasium. From 1844 to 1847, he furthered his education at the University of Geneva and, from 1847 to 1867, worked as a science teacher at the progymnasium in Vevey. In 1864, he became an associate professor, and, from 1871, was a full professor of botany at the Academy of Lausanne. From 1879 to 1881, he served as academic rector.

He was the author of many scientific papers with botanical, mycological and zoological themes, a few of which have been translated into English. In 1873, he published a book on introductory botany titled Entretiens sur la botanique. Also, he is the taxonomic authority of the bryophyte variety Thamnium alopecurum var. lemani. In the field of human nutrition, he collaborated with Henri Nestlé in the development of a powdered infant formula.

== Articles by Schnetzler that have been published in English ==
- "Protection of herbaria and entomological collections from insects by means of sulphide of carbon", 1876.
- "On an aerial alga inhabiting the bark of the vine", 1884.
- "On the infection of a frog-tadpole by Saprolegnia ferax", 1888.
