= Georg Friedrich Schnittspahn =

Georg Friedrich Schnittspahn (3 January 1810, in Darmstadt – 22 December 1865, in Darmstadt) was a German botanist. He was the son of Hofgärtner (court gardener) Johann August Schnittspahn (1763-1842).

He was trained as a gardener in Darmstadt, and by way of a scholarship from Louis I, Grand Duke of Hesse, he visited the Jardin des Plantes in Paris in 1829. From 1831 to 1838 he taught classes in botany at the agricultural establishment of Heinrich Wilhelm von Pabst in Kranichstein. Beginning in 1841 he served as inspector at the botanical garden in Darmstadt, where in 1855 he was appointed director.

In 1841 he became a full-time instructor of botany and zoology at the Höhere Gewerbschule (vocational school) in Darmstadt. In 1845 he was cofounder of the Naturhistorischen Vereins für das Grossherzogthum Hessen (Natural History Society of the Grand Duchy of Hesse).

In 1842 Carl Heinrich "Bipontinus" Schultz named the genus Schnittspahnia in his honor.

== Selected writings ==
- Flora der Gefässe-Pflanzen des Grossherzogthums Hessen : ein Taschenbuch für botanische Excursionen (3rd edition, 1853) – Vascular plants of the Grand Duchy of Hesse: a paperback for botanical excursions.
- Nachweis der Abbildungen der Obstarten aus der deutschen, belgischen, holländischen und theilweise französischen pomologischen Literatur, 1863 – Pictures of fruit species from German, Belgian, Dutch and French (partially) pomological literature.
- Neue semperviven (with Carl Bernhard Lehmann, 1863) – New Sempervivum.
