= Giorgio Santi =

Italian botanist (1746–1822)

Giorgio Santi (1746–1822) was an Italian naturalist, chemist, botanist, traveler, zoologist and geologist.

Santi was a professor of Natural Sciences in Pisa from 1782 to 1822, a director of the Museum of Natural History and the Prefect of the botanical garden of Pisa from 1782 to 1814. He was born in Pienza in 1746 and graduated in Medicine and Surgery at the University of Siena. He practiced at the Hospital of Santa Maria Nuova and won a scholarship to Siena Biringucci apprenticeship, and because of that he moved to France in 1773, studying at Montpellier and Paris, where he met Buffon, Lavoisier and other famous scientists. In 1782 he returned to Florence, where the Grand Duke Peter Leopold gave him the post of professor in Pisa with the creation of a new chair of Natural Sciences and Chemistry. His residence was in the Botanical Garden in Pisa, but he lived with his wife Anna Simonelli (married in 1790) in Pienza until he died on December 30, 1822. He dedicated himself to the study of natural features of land, in particular the territory today corresponding to the provinces of Siena and Grosseto, and compiling interesting travel reports. He published on several occasions between 1795 and 1806 (three volumes). He was a founding father of Geology as an autonomous science and strove for the spread and adoption of new chemical theories in academia. It was in close relationship with Spallanzani, Giovanni Fabbroni, Gaetano Savi, and many other scientists and academics of the time.

The standard author abbreviation Santi is used to indicate this person as the author when citing a botanical name.
