= Johann Andreas Scherer =

Austrian chemist and botanist (1755–1844)

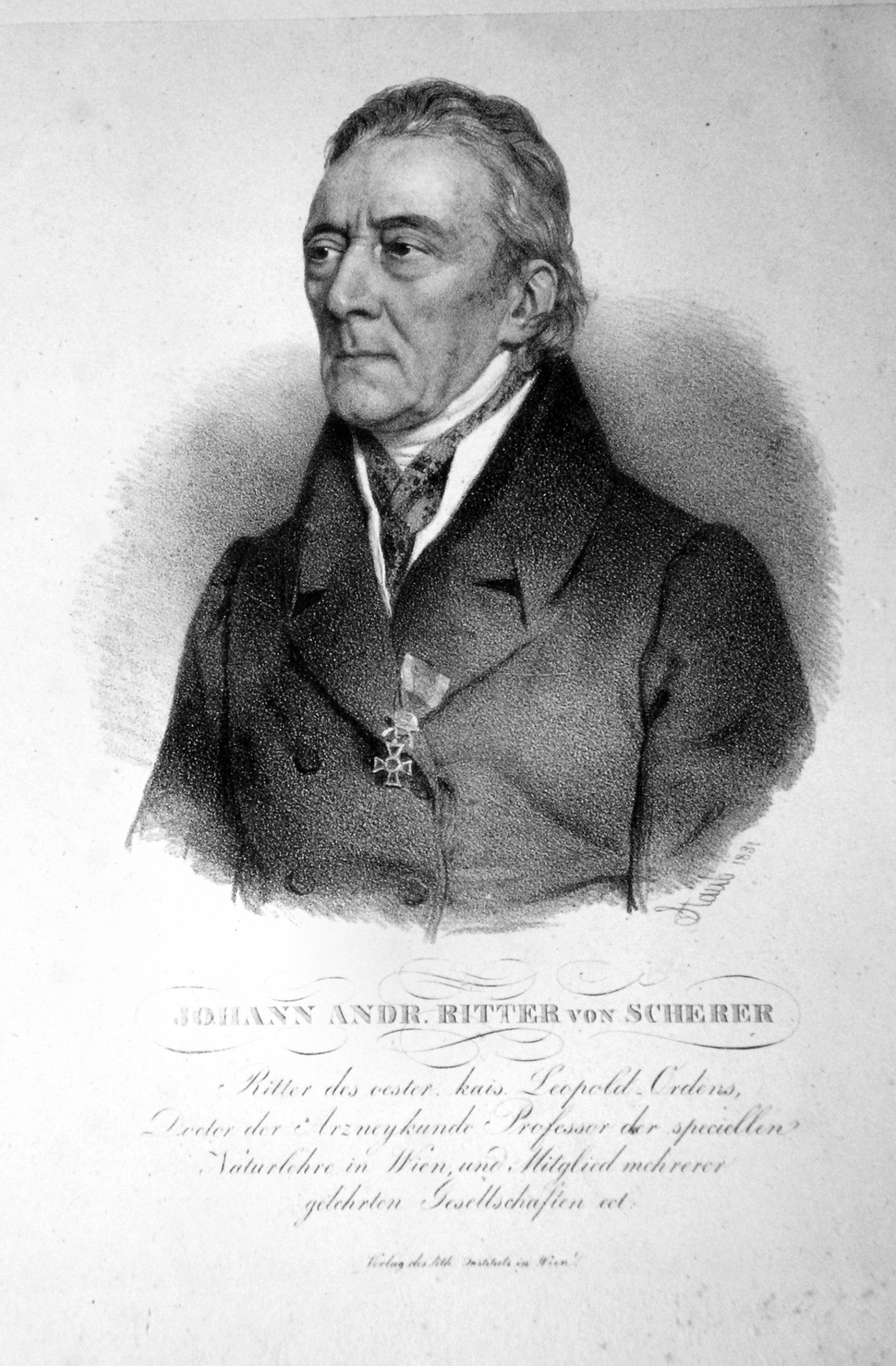
Johann Andreas Scherer (1831)

Johann Baptist Andreas Ritter von Scherer (24 June 1755 – 10 April 1844) was an Austrian chemist and botanist.

Scherer was born in Prague. He studied chemistry at the universities of Prague and Vienna, receiving his doctorate in 1782. As a student his instructors included botanists Joseph Gottfried Mikan and Nikolaus Joseph von Jacquin. In 1797 he became a professor of chemistry at the Theresianum in Vienna, followed by a professorship at the Polytechnic Institute in Prague (from 1803). From 1807 to 1834 he was a professor of specialized natural history at the University of Vienna.

In 1811 he was elevated to the status of "Ritter" (title of nobility). From 1832 he was an editor of the Österreichischen medizinischen Jahrbücher. He died in Vienna.

== Selected works ==
- Eudiometria sive methodus aeris atmosphaerici puritatem salubritatemve examinandi, 1782 (dissertation thesis).
- Geschichte der Luftgüteprüfungslehre für Aerzte und Naturfreunde, 1785 – History of air quality testing for physicians and lovers of nature.
- Versuche mit Pflanzen, 1786 (translation of Jan Ingenhousz' plant experiments).
- Beobachtungen und Versuche über das pflanzenaehnliche Wesen in den warmen Karlsbader und Toeplitzer Waessern in Boehmen, 1787 – Observations and experiments on plant-like entities in the warm waters of Karlsbad and Töplitz in Bohemia.
- Versuch einer neuen Nomenclatur für Deutsche Chymisten (with Christian Friedrich Wappler), 1792 – Essay on a new nomenclature for German chemists.
- Beweis, dass Johann Mayow von hundert Jahren den Grund zur antiphlogistischen Chemie und Physiologie gelegt hat, 1793 – Evidence that John Mayow had laid the foundation for anti-phlogiston chemistry and physiology 100 years ago.
