= Václav Spitzner =

Austro-Hungarian botanist

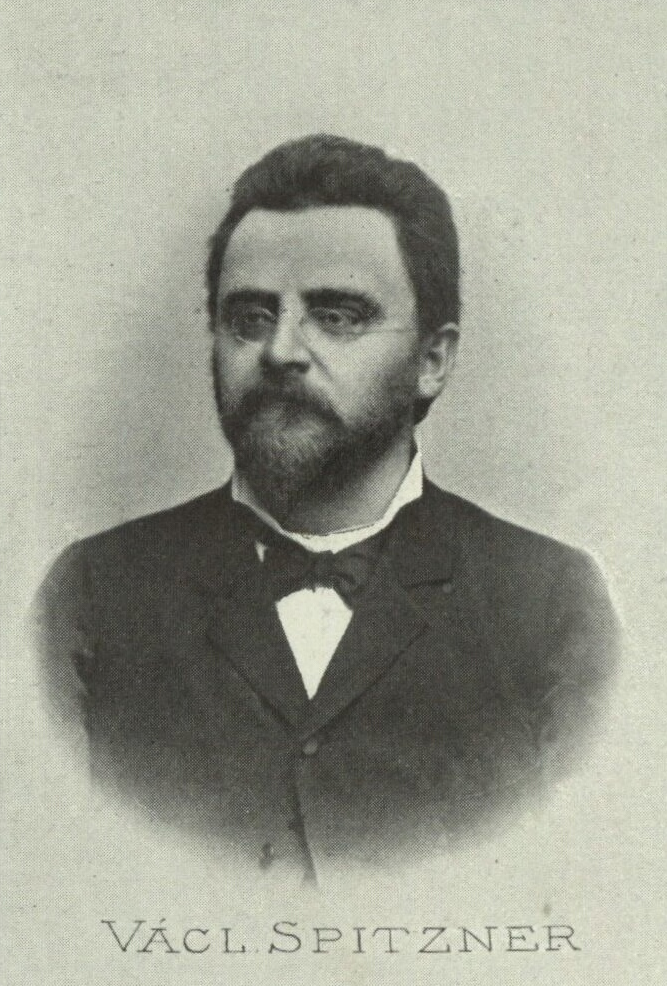

Václav Spitzner (German: Wenzel Spitzner; 23 September 1852 – 1 September 1907) was a botanist and naturalist from Austria-Hungary. He described a number of plant species from the Bohemian and Moravian regions. He examined the lichens and higher plants in a major floristic work published in 1887, Květena okresu prostějovského a plumlovského ("Flora of the Prostějov and Plumlov Districts"). He also wrote on the bugs (Hemiptera) and on geology.

== Life and work ==
Spitzner was born in Beroun, Bohemia, and was educated at Slaný before going to the University of Prague to study natural sciences. Influenced by Ladislav Čelakovský and Moritz Willkomm he took an interest in botany. After compulsory military service he worked as a teacher at a Czech secondary school in Prostějov until his death. In his spare time he took an interest in collecting plants, studying geology and entomology. He was a member of the Moravian naturalists society in Olomouc and founded the Natural Science Club in Prostějov (1898). He travelled widely both within Moravia and elsewhere across Europe. His collections were held at the Prostějov Museum before it moved to the herbarium at the Masaryk University in Brno.

The standard author abbreviation Spitzn. is used to indicate this person as the author when citing a botanical name.
