= Gustav Senn =

Swiss botanist (1875–1945)

Gustav Alfred Senn (9 November 1875 in Basel, Switzerland – 10 July 1945 in Basel) was a Swiss botanist and historian of botany. He was a student of Georg Klebs and worked on the movement and morphological changes of chloroplasts. He also studied Theophrastus.

== Selected works ==
The standard author abbreviation Senn is used to indicate this person as the author when citing a botanical name.

- Die Gestalts- und Lageveränderung der Pflanzen-Chromatophoren, Leipzig: Wilhelm Engelmann, 1908.
- Die Entwicklung der biologischen Forschungsmethode in der Antike und ihre grundsätzlitche Förderung durch Theophrast von Eresos, Aarau: H. R. Sauerländer & Company, 1933. Series "Veröffentlichungen der Schweizerischen Gesellschaft für Geschichte der Medizin und der Naturwissenschaften", #8. OCLC 654748954.
