= Johann Heinrich Dierbach =

German pharmacist and botanist (1788–1845)

Johann Heinrich Dierbach (23 March 1788 in Heidelberg – 11 May 1845 in Heidelberg) was a German pharmacist and botanist.

He studied medicine at the University of Heidelberg, receiving his doctorate in 1816. During the following year, he became a lecturer at Heidelberg and in 1820 an associate professor. At the university, he taught classes on subjects with botanical and medico-pharmacological themes.

He was the author of numerous articles in botanical, medical and pharmaceutical journals. The plant genus Dierbachia (syn. Dunalia, family Solanaceae) was named in his honor by Kurt Sprengel.

== Selected works ==
- Flora heidelbergensis (2 parts, 1819–20).
- Die Arzneimitlel des Hippokrates, 1824 – The drug of Hippocrates.
- Die neuesten Entdeckungen in der Materia Medica, für praktische Aerzte geordnet (2 volumes, 1828) – The latest discoveries in materia medica.
- Abhandlung über die Arzneikräfte der Pflanzen : verglichen mit ihrer Structur und ihren chemischen Bestandtheilen (1831) – Treatise on the medicinal properties of plants; comparison of their structure and chemical constituents.
- Flora apiciana. Ein Beitrag zur näheren Kenntniss der Nahrungsmittel der alten Römer (1831) – Flora apiciana, contribution to the knowledge of the diet of the ancient Romans.
- Flora mythologica oder Pflanzenkunde in bezug auf mythologie und symbolik der Griechen und Römer (1833) – Flora mythologica, or botany in regards to the mythology and symbolism of the Greeks and Romans.
