= Gaetano Savi =

Italian botanist and mycologist (1769–1844)

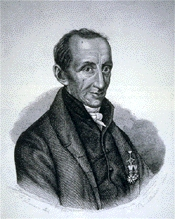
Gaetano Savi (1769–1844)

Gaetano Savi (13 June 1769 – 28 April 1844) was an Italian naturalist., botanist and mycologist.

He was born in Florence and studied with Giorgio Santi (1746–1822) and Adolfo Targioni Tozzetti (1823–1902). In 1798 he published Flora Pisana (flora of Pisa); in 1801 the first edition of Trattato degli alberi della Toscana (treatise on the trees of Tuscany); in 1808 Botanicon Etruscum (botany of Etruria); and in 1818 Flora Italiana (flora of Italy). He taught physics and botany at the University of Pisa and directed the botanical garden there from 1814. In 1816, he was elected a member of the Royal Swedish Academy of Sciences.

Two of his sons also became natural scientists: The geologist and ornithologist Paolo Savi (1798–1871) and the botanist Pietro Savi (1811–1871).

He was honoured in 1808, when botanist Constantine Samuel Rafinesque published Savia Raf., this genus is now a synonym of Amphicarpaea (in the Fabaceae family). Then in 2008, Ignaz Urban and Petra Hoffmann published Heterosavia which is a genus of the family of Phyllanthaceae.
