= Jacob Schneck =

American physician and botanist (1843–1906)

- Schneck in a portrait published in 1896
- Born: December 11, 1843 near New Harmony, Indiana, U.S.
- Died: December 18, 1906 (aged 63); Mount Carmel, Illinois, U.S.
- Alma mater: Chicago Medical College (M.D., 1871)
- Occupation: Physician
- Known for: Flora of the lower Wabash Valley; survey of the prehistoric mounds of Wabash County, Illinois
- Spouse: Mary Hartman (m. 1872)
- Scientific career
- Fields: Botany
- Author abbrev. (botany): Schneck

Jacob Schneck (December 11, 1843 – December 18, 1906) was an American physician and botanist of Mount Carmel, Illinois. A Union veteran of the American Civil War, he served first in an Indiana infantry regiment and then in the United States Navy, and practiced medicine at Mount Carmel from 1871 until his death. His Catalogue of the Flora of the Wabash Valley below the Mouth of White River (1876) recorded the plants of the lower Wabash River valley in Indiana and Illinois, and his measurements and observations of the region's trees were used by Robert Ridgway and Charles Sprague Sargent. Schneck's oak, first described as Quercus schneckii and later treated as a variety of the Shumard oak, was named in his honor, and several other plants bear his name. He also explored the prehistoric mounds of Wabash County, Illinois, and gave Native American artifacts to the Smithsonian Institution.

== Early life and Civil War ==
Schneck was born on December 11, 1843, near New Harmony in Posey County, Indiana, the eldest of the six children of John F. Schneck and Elizabeth Burkhart. His father, born in Germany in 1812, had emigrated in 1839 and settled at Lancaster, Pennsylvania, where he married Elizabeth, a native of Alsace, in January 1843; the couple moved to New Harmony later that year. John Schneck worked as a carpenter and later as a farmer until his death in 1857.

On November 13, 1861, Schneck enlisted as a private in Company E of the 60th Indiana Infantry Regiment, in which he rose to corporal. With the regiment he fought at Munfordville, Kentucky, in September 1862 and at Arkansas Post in January 1863, and was present at the siege of Vicksburg. He was captured on the skirmish line at Jackson, Mississippi, a few days after the fall of Vicksburg, and was paroled and sent north. Because of an irregularity in the exchange of prisoners he could not rejoin his regiment, and on May 18, 1864, he enlisted in the navy at Brooklyn, New York. He served on a vessel assigned to watch for and capture blockade runners and then on the USS Metacomet, and took part in the naval campaign off Mobile, at Fort Morgan and at Spanish Fort. He was discharged at Philadelphia on May 31, 1865.

== Medical career ==
After the war Schneck attended an academy at Owensville, Indiana, to train as a teacher. In 1867 he taught school at Olney, Illinois, where he began to study medicine under a local physician; the following year he moved to Mount Carmel, where he taught and continued his studies under William Graham. He attended a course of lectures at the Chicago Medical College in the winter of 1868–69, returned to teaching when his money ran out, and received his M.D. on March 13, 1871. He practiced at Mount Carmel for the rest of his life. He was president of the Wabash Medical Society, a member of the American Medical Association, the Illinois State Medical Society and the National Association of Railway Surgeons, and surgeon for the Cairo division of the Big Four system and for the Illinois Central Railroad. He published several papers in the Journal of the American Medical Association between 1890 and 1894, among them a case of tetany in a ten-year-old girl (1890), which J. P. Crozer Griffith included in his 1895 review of seventy-two American cases, and notes on unusual effects of quinine on the skin, and "Stomatitis materna" in the first issue of the Illinois Medical Journal (1899).

== Botany ==
Schneck's principal botanical work, the Catalogue of the Flora of the Wabash Valley below the Mouth of White River, and Observations Thereon, was published in 1876 in the seventh annual report of the Geological Survey of Indiana (for 1875), pages 504–579. The Botanical Gazette called it "worthy of a more extended notice", and in a review the following year John Merle Coulter noted that its plants came mainly from Gibson and Posey counties in Indiana and Wabash County in Illinois. Coulter remarked on "the many rare plants contained in this list" and on the "abundance of southern types" that had spread up the low valley, and quoted Schneck's description of a grape vine 32 inches (81 cm) in circumference and nearly 150 feet (46 m) long. Coulter also reported, and disputed, Schneck's view that the end of the annual prairie fires had allowed young trees to take over former prairie. The catalogue named several species that Schneck believed were disappearing "with advancing civilization". A bibliography of Indiana botany in the Indiana Academy of Science's proceedings for 1893 (published in 1894) described it as a list of 867 species and noted that A. H. Young's 1871 flora of Jefferson County had been "soon followed by one for the lower Wabash Valley by Dr. Schneck". Charles C. Deam published additions to it in 1912. When Coulter and Charles R. Barnes compiled their 1881 catalogue of the plants of Indiana, they relied on Schneck for the state's southwestern counties, describing him as living "in a most favored botanical region". A 2017 revision of the genus Catalpa includes the catalogue among the works that established that the hardy catalpa of the Ohio Valley was a species distinct from the southern catalpa. In 2011 Joseph Kirkbride and Richard Olsen designated a specimen Schneck collected in the Wabash bottom near Mount Carmel in May 1879 as the neotype of the northern catalpa, Catalpa speciosa.

Schneck supplied measurements and observations to Robert Ridgway for two papers on the trees of the lower Wabash in the Proceedings of the United States National Museum. In the first (1882) Ridgway acknowledged his help and printed his measurements of trees; the second (1895) drew its new data "chiefly" from Schneck's investigations, made after the state authorities had appointed him to prepare an exhibit of Illinois woods for the New Orleans Exposition of 1884–85, at which he served as commissioner of the Illinois forest exhibit. Commenting on their work in 1895, Garden and Forest wrote that the forests near the mouth of the White River had as a result "been more carefully studied than those in any other spot of equal interest west of the Allegheny Mountains". According to the Wabash County historian B. A. Harvey, a collection of woods assembled by Schneck was exhibited at the World's Columbian Exposition of 1893 and afterward kept at the Field Museum in Chicago.

Schneck contributed short notes to the Botanical Gazette from 1877 into the 1890s, among them observations of insects mutilating the flowers of the trumpet creeper. His two 1884 papers on the American mistletoe (Phoradendron) described its life cycle from specimens he had collected and recorded its host trees around Mount Carmel over 18 months in 1882–83; a 2014 study of mistletoe in Illinois drew on both. Specimen labels at the University of Illinois identify a "Jacob Schneck Herbarium" bought in 1914. Taxonomic Literature (1985) lists his herbarium at the Illinois State Museum, with further material at the University of Illinois, the Missouri Botanical Garden and the New York Botanical Garden; his field notes are at the University of Illinois and his letters at the Gray Herbarium. He was president of the Mount Carmel Scientific Society from 1889 to 1891, and a member of the American Association for the Advancement of Science, the Torrey Botanical Club, the Academy of Science of St. Louis and the Chicago Academy of Sciences.

=== Eponyms ===
Nathaniel Lord Britton described a red oak of the region as Quercus schneckii, "Schneck's red oak", in 1901. According to Charles C. Deam, Schneck was "one of the first to discover that this form was not our common red oak", and Britton named it after him when Schneck called his attention to it. In 1918 Sargent reduced it to a variety of the Shumard oak, Quercus shumardii var. schneckii, distinguished by its deep acorn cups. A 1929 survey of the trees of Illinois states that Schneck's oak was "named in honor of Dr. Jacob Schneck of Mt. Carmel". The type specimen of Alfred Rehder's Acer saccharum var. schneckii (1913) was collected at Mount Carmel by Sargent and Schneck on August 24, 1894, and that of Sargent's hybrid hickory Carya × schneckii (1918) was collected by Schneck at Lawrenceville, Illinois, on October 15, 1895; a 1953 federal checklist of American trees notes that the hickory was "named for its discoverer, Jacob Schneck". Sargent had earlier recorded in The Silva of North America that a natural hybrid between the pecan and a hickory in Wabash County "was made known by Dr. Jacob Schneck of Mount Carmel in the autumn of 1894". Liberty Hyde Bailey's blackberry Rubus schneckii (1945) cites Schneck's collections from near Mount Carmel and from Gibson County, Indiana, and describes him as a "botanical collector in the Wabash country".

== Zoology ==
Between 1880 and 1886 Schneck published short notes in The American Naturalist on the reptiles of southeastern Illinois, among them "Longevity of turtles" (1886), and Harrison Garman's 1892 synopsis of the state's reptiles and amphibians credited him with the discovery of the river cooter (Pseudemys concinna) in Illinois, from a specimen Schneck had sent him. Plant, bird and mammal specimens he collected are in the National Museum of Natural History.

== Archaeology ==
In 1875 Schneck gave the Smithsonian Institution a group of Native American artifacts, among them a grinding tablet, a hammerstone, a small stone pipe and a stone hoe from Mount Carmel. In 1882 Edwin Atlee Barber published in The American Naturalist Schneck's sketch of a slate pipe carved in the form of a small bird, found about 2 feet (0.61 m) below the surface in a mound in Wabash County. In an address published in 1919, Theodore G. Risley credited him with the most complete study of the county's prehistoric remains: Schneck had located 92 mounds, explored many of them, and written detailed accounts of them. In a 1963 survey of the Wabash Valley, the Illinois State Museum archaeologist Howard D. Winters noted that Schneck had removed a large quantity of material from the McCleary's Bluff site in the 19th century, including long-necked bottles, pottery effigy pipes and rattles, and a fluorspar figurine. Winters also drew on Schneck's descriptions of other sites, among them the Hanging Rock site, where Schneck recorded 20 circular house patterns, and the Dunkel mound group, where he reported a copper kettle and china beads.

== Other writing ==
In 1890 Schneck read a paper on the Rappite community of New Harmony before the Mount Carmel Scientific Society. With additions by the geologist Richard Owen, made shortly before Owen's death, it was printed at Evansville as The Rappites: Interesting Notes about Early New Harmony.

== Personal life and death ==
On November 28, 1872, Schneck married Mary Hartman; they had one son, Sereno. Schneck died at Mount Carmel on December 18, 1906. Torreya and the Botanical Gazette reported his death, the latter calling him "an old and well-known student of the flora of his region".

The 2.5-mile (4.0 km) Schneck Trail at Beall Woods State Park, near Mount Carmel, was dedicated to him as a living memorial to a pioneer physician and botanist of Mount Carmel.

== Selected works ==
- "Catalogue of the Flora of the Wabash Valley below the Mouth of White River, and Observations Thereon". In: E. T. Cox, Seventh Annual Report of the Geological Survey of Indiana, Made during the Year 1875. Indianapolis, 1876, pp. 504–579.
- "Some Plants of the Lower Wabash". Botanical Gazette 2 (1877): 83.
- "Notes on Phoradendron flavescens". Botanical Gazette 9 (1884): 94–96.
- "Mutilation of the Flower of Tecoma radicans". Botanical Gazette 16 (1891): 314–315.
- (with Richard Owen) The Rappites: Interesting Notes about Early New Harmony. Evansville: Courier Co., 1890.
- "Stomatitis Materna". Illinois Medical Journal 1 (1899).
