= USS Metacomet =

USS Metacomet may refer to the following ships of the United States Navy:

- USS Metacomet (1854), was acquired by the US Navy in 1858 and renamed Pulaski
- USS Metacomet (1863), was a wooden side-wheel steamer, launched 7 March 1863 and sold in 1865
