= Jelinger Cookson Symons =

English barrister, school inspector and writer

Jelinger Cookson Symons (27 August 1809 – 7 April 1860) was an English barrister, school inspector and writer.

== Early life ==
Jelinger Cookson Symons was born at West Ilsley, Berkshire, on 27 August 1809; his father Jelinger Symons was a cleric known as a naturalist. He was educated at Corpus Christi College, Cambridge, where he graduated B.A. in 1832.

== Public life ==
In 1835, Symons received a commission from the Home Office to inquire into the state of the hand-loom weavers and manufacturers. He travelled for it in Lancashire and Scotland, and parts of Switzerland. He then held a tithe commissionership, and was a commissioner to inquire into the state of the mining population of the north of England.

In 1843, Symons was called to the bar at the Middle Temple. He went the Oxford circuit, and attended the Gloucester quarter sessions. During this period of his life he was editor of the Law Magazine, up to its union with the Law Review in 1856. In 1846 the Committee of Council on Education appointed him as one of the commissioners to collect information on the state of education in Wales. The reports of the commissioners were published in 1848. The publication of the reports in Wales caused uproar because of the perception that they disparaged the Welsh, which incited the criticism of treachery, see Treachery of the Blue Books.

In 1848, Lord Lansdowne made Symons one of Her Majesty's permanent inspectors of schools, a post he retained through life. He also concerned himself with the establishment of reformatories for juvenile criminals, drawing attention to the "colony" at Mettray in France.

Symons died at Malvern House, Great Malvern, on 7 April 1860.

== Works ==
Symons's works include:

- A Few Thoughts on Volition and Agency. 1833.
- Arts and Artizans at Home and Abroad, with Sketches of the Progress of Foreign Manufactures. 1839.
- Outlines of Popular Economy. 1840.
- The Attorney and Solicitors Act, 6 & 7 Vict. cap. 73, with an analysis, notes, and index. 1843.
- Parish Settlements and the Practice of Appeal (2nd ed.). 1846 [1844].
- Railway Liabilities as they affect Subscribers, Committees, Allottees, and Scripholders, inter se, and Third Parties. 1846.
- A Plea for Schools, which sets forth the Dearth of Education and the Growth of Crime. 1847.
- Tactics for the Times, as regards the Condition and Treatment of the Dangerous Classes. 1849.
- School Economy, a practical treatise on the best mode of establishing and teaching schools. 1852.
- A Scheme of Direct Taxation. 1853.
- The Industrial Capacities of South Wales. 1855.
- Lunar Motion, the whole Argument stated and illustrated by Diagrams. 1856.
- Sir Robert Peel as a Type of Statesmanship. 1856.
- Milford, Past, Present, and Future. 1857.
- William Burke, the author of 'Junius'. 1859.
- Rough Types of English Life. 1860.

With Richard Griffiths Welford and others, Symons published Reports of Cases in the Law of Real Property and Conveyancing argued and determined in all the Courts of Law and Equity, 1846.

== Family ==
Symons married in 1845 Angelina, daughter of Edward Kendall. They had Jelinger Edward, born in 1847, and other children.

== Notes ==
Attribution

This article incorporates text from a publication now in the public domain: Lee, Sidney, ed. (1898). "Symons, Jelinger Cookson". Dictionary of National Biography. Vol. 55. London: Smith, Elder & Co.
