= Maria Cengia Sambo =

Italian lichenologist and botanist

Maria Cengia Sambo (23 October 1888 – 29 November 1939) was an Italian botanist, specializing in lichenology. Her work in the early twentieth century on the nature of the lichen symbiosis along with collection of many specimens and records of lichen distributions was particularly significant.

== Early life ==
Her father died when she was only three years old. When she was nine, her mother, Clelia Fadinelli, married a professor Benvenuto Pellegrini, who became a father figure to her. Thanks to Pellegrini's connection to university, she was captivated by subjects like botany, physics, and astronomy. In particular, her cousin, forest inspector Vittorio Pellegrini, brought her along to gather animals, fossils, minerals, and plants, giving her the chance to explore the natural sciences. In 1905 she received a diploma enabling her to teach in primary school education which she did for a brief period. She then attended the University of Padua and graduated with a degree in geometry. Afterwards she obtained a second degree, this time in the natural sciences, and taught physics and mathematics at a technical school in Vicenza.

== Career ==
She collected a vast number of botanical specimens, in particular lichens, from the Italian Alps, Venezia Euganea, Belluno region, Feltra region, Garda, and the Euganean Hills. She produced a large part of the work and research on lichens during the First World War without the help of other scientists specializing in lichens. She also published some papers on extra-European lichens at the time. Her isolation in the field contributed to her being cited less often in lichenology.

From 1920 to 1923, she taught botany at the University of Urbino, and continued her work in lichens. During this time she lived in the northern Veneto region of Italy. While there, she coined the term polysymbiosis to describe mutalism between multiple species. She had cultured bacteria from lichen thalli, assigning the bacteria to Azotobacter, which would create a symbiotic relationship between three microbes.

She married Ettore Sambo in 1924 and they subsequently had five children together. He worked in the Department of Botany of the University of Florence and lived in Prato. She moved to join him there and also joined the Department of Botany at the University of Florence. They worked together to study lichens on Monte Ferrato and she focused on the ecology of the lichens. The couple catalogued many lichens, which have been updated by modern lichenologists. There were some errors in their catalogue, likely due to the resources available in the early 1900s, as well as being isolated from their Central-European lichenologist peers.

However, she did collaborate with some European lichenologists. In her 1930 study Lichens of Patagonia and other regions of Argentina as told by Salesiani missionaries she worked closely with Alberto De Agostini. He coordinated the collection of lichens from Argentina and Sambo worked to catalogue them.

In the course of her career, she studied 124 different species of lichens. She characterised 11 new genera and species including the genus Tylophoropsis and the species Phylliscidiopsis abissinica, Actinoplaca balboana, Cyphelium kenyanum, Tylophoropsis nyeriana and Usnea epifilla.

She died in 1939 at 51 years of age.

== Publications ==
Maria Cengia Sambo was the author of around 50 scientific publications. Her work was published in New Italian Botany Journal and Studi Trentiti di Scienze Naturali, and appeared in publications of the Italian Society of Natural Sciences, the Italian Botany Society, the Botanical Gardens of the University of Naples, the Italian Society for the Progress of Science, the Italian section of the International Society of Microbiology, and the Botanical Archives.

The most significant are considered to be:

- Cengia-Sambo, Maria. (1929). Contributo alla flora vascolare dell'Urbinate. Nuovo Giornale Botanica Italiana. 35: 425-506.
- Cengia-Sambo, M. (1930) Licheni della Patagonia e di altre regioni dell'Argentina raccolti dai missionarii salesiani. Contributi Scientifici delle Missioni Salesiana del Venerabile Don Bosci, Tornino/Contrib. Sci. Miss. Salesin. 6: 73 pp. 2 maps, 9 pl..
- Cengia-Sambo, M. (1939). Licheni del Brasile.
- Cengia-Sambo, M. (1940) Casi di parassitismo fra due specie licheniche e di autoparassitismo. Considerazioni sul consorzio lichenico. Annali di botanica.

== Legacy ==
Maria Cengia Sambo and her husband had a personal library of publications about flowers, plants and environments. This was donated by their daughter Emilia Sambo to the Fondazione PARSEC, a Natural Science Centre in Prato. In 2017 an urban park of Villa Pisani di Este near Venice, where she was born, was re-named after her.
