= Siegfried Stockmayer =

Siegfried Stockmayer (8 August 1868, Vienna – 20 March 1933, Vienna) was an Austrian botanist and physician. He collected plants in Austria and Italy.

After graduating from Vienna's Schottengymnasium, Stockmayer studied medicine and botany from 1886 to 1892 at the University of Vienna, where his teachers included Julius Wiesner and Hans Molisch. At the University of Vienna, Stockmayer graduated in 1892 as Dr. med. and from 1892 to 1894 was an assistant professor for general and experimental pathology. After working as a general practitioner in Frankenfels and then in Unterwaltersdorf (now a part of Ebreichsdorf), he became the owner of his own medical practice in Stammersdorf (now a part of Vienna). In his student days he was interested in botany, which was furthered by his friendship with Günther Beck von Mannagetta und Lerchenau. As a young general practitioner, Stockmayer gained a reputation as a phycologist and made contributions to the Schedae ad 'Kryptogamas exsiccatas' ... (Notes on cryptogamic exsiccatae) in the Annalen des k. k. naturhistorischen Hofmuseums (1894). Later in his career he was particularly interested in thermophilic blue-green algae, which he collected in Warmbad Villach in the summer. At his villa in Stammersdorf, he set up a research laboratory and library for specialized work on phycology. He planned a thorough study of the algae found in Lake Neusiedl. However, his algological research was limited by his work as a physician. Nevertheless, he published many outstanding scientific papers on blue-green algae and motivated the photographer Alexander Niklitschek to investigate the movement problem in the genus Oscillatoria. From 1889 Stockmayer was a member of Austria's Zoologisch-Botanische Gesellschaft (a non-profit society founded in 1851 for the promotion of knowledge about zoology and botany). He was killed in a traffic accident in 1933. His botanical collections were given to the Naturhistorisches Museum Wien.
