= Siu Shih Chang =

Chinese botanist and plant collector

Siu Shih Chang (or Xui Shi Zhang, born 1918) is a Chinese botanist and plant collector. The elm species Ulmus changii was named for him after he discovered it in 1936.

== Publications ==
- Chang, S. S. (1998). Cannaboideae. In: Chang Siushih & Wu Chengyih, eds., Fl. Reipubl. Popularis Sin. 23(1): 220224.
- Chang, S. S. (1989). Flora Guizhouensis, Vol. 4. Spermatophyta. Sichuan Nationalities Publishing, 1989. ISBN 7540902604, ISBN 9787540902605
