= Francesco Savignone =

Italian physician and botanist

Francesco Savignone (born 1818) was an Italian physician and botanist.
