= Henri L. Sudre =

Henri L. Sudre (12 January 1862 – 4 December 1918) was a French botanist.

Up until 1904, he served as an instructor at a teacher's college in Albi, afterwards working in Toulouse. He specialized in the field of batology (study of brambles), being the author of numerous works associated with the genus Rubus, including an acclaimed monograph on European species, "Rubi Europae vel Monographia iconibus illustrata ruborum Europae", published in several installments from 1908 to 1913. He also made significant contributions in his investigations of the genus Hieracium, being the taxonomic authority of numerous species.

Between 1903 and 1917 Sudre issued the exsiccata series Batotheca europaea and Herbarium Hieraciorum. His herbarium, which contains many types of plants, is kept in Agen, Lot-et-Garonne.

== Selected works ==
- Excursions batologiques dans les Pyrénées : ou description et analyse des Rubus des Pyrénées francaises, 1898 – Batologic excursions in the Pyrénées; description and analysis of Rubus native to the French Pyrénées.
- Les Hieracium du centre de la France, 1902 – Hieracium of central France.
- Notes sur quelques "Hieracium" des Pyrénées, 1902 – Notes on some Hieracium native to the Pyrénées.
- "Florule Toulousaine" (1907).
- "Rubi Europae vel Monographia iconibus illustrata ruborum Europae" (1908–1913).
- Bréviaire du batalogue, ou Analyse descriptive des ronces d'Europe, 1913 – Descriptive analysis of brambles found in Europe.
