= Sushil Kumar Mukerji =

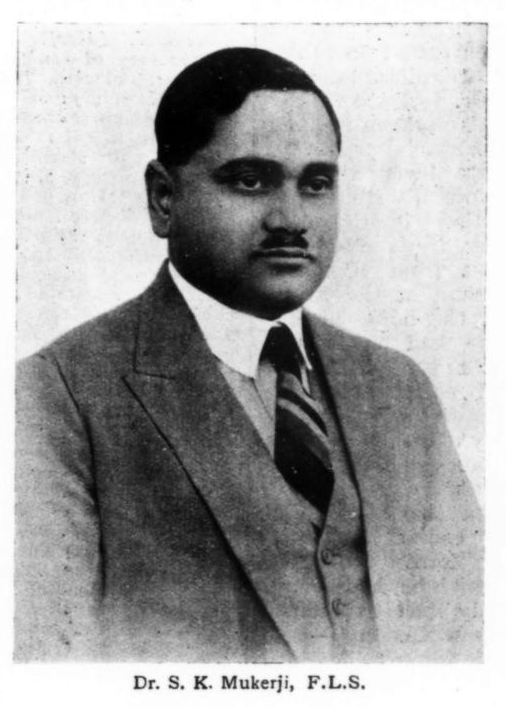

Sushil Kumar Mukerji (March 1896 – 5 August 1934) was an Indian botanist who worked at the University of Lucknow. He had a special interest in plant ecology, particularly of freshwater plants.

Mukerji was born in Nowgong, Chhatarpur, son of B. Kali Taran Mukerji. His grandfather Chandrakanta Mukerji was dewan and minister for Bijawar State. He went to study in Allahabad and received a BSc from Muir College in 1916. He received a master's degree in botany from Canning College in 1920. He worked as a demonstrator in biology from 1918. When the college was placed under the newly created University of Lucknow, he was made university demonstrator in botany. In 1921 he became a lecturer and in 1927 he became a reader. He went to University College, London for his doctorate and wrote his thesis in 1927. He worked under F. W. Oliver and E. J. Salisbury, studying the autecology and distribution of Mercurialis perennis. He became a Fellow of the Linnean Society (1927), a member of the British Ecological Society (1926) and of the British Association (1927). He examined the flora of the Dal lake of Kashmir, the Satpura and Vindhya ranges as well as of Lucknow. His knowledge of the plants of Kashmir made him collaborate with Helmut de Terra on a collection of fossils. He examined soil chemistry and the distribution of plants. He was selected to attend the International Congress of Soil Science in 1935 but died before it following an appendicitis surgery. He was known for his keen sense of justice and the readiness to fight for others. He was nicknamed as "Mussolini" for his appearance and demeanour.
