= Franz Joseph Schelver =

German physician and botanist (1778–1832)

Franz Joseph Schelver (24 July 1778 in Osnabrück – 30 November 1832 in Heidelberg) was a German medical doctor and botanist.

He studied medicine at the University of Jena, and later obtained his doctorate at the University of Göttingen (1798). In 1801 he qualified as a lecturer at the University of Halle, then from 1803 to 1806, worked as an associate professor at Jena. Afterwards, he was named a full professor of medicine at the University of Heidelberg, where from 1811 to 1827, he served as head of the botanical garden. He was a devotee of the "nature-philosophy" espoused by Friedrich Schelling and Lorenz Oken.

The plant genus Schelveria (Nees, 1827; family Scrophulariaceae) is probably named after him, although its etymology is seemingly unknown.

== Published works ==
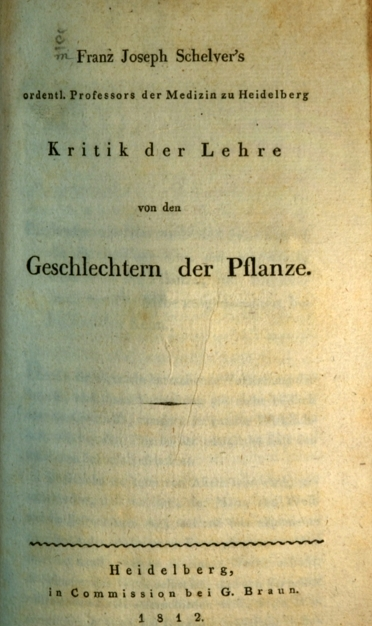
Kritik der Lehre von den Geschlechtern der Pflanze (1812)

Early on, he maintained an interest in entomology, and published a number of treatises on the subject in Rudolf Wiedemann's Archiv für Zoologie und Zootomie. In 1798 he was the author of a book on the sense organs of insects and worms, titled Versuch einer Naturgeschichte der Sinneswerkzeuge bei den Insecten und Würmern. In the areas of nature philosophy, medicine and botany, he published the following:

- Elementarlehre der organischen Natur, first part Organomie, 1800 – Elementary instruction on organic nature; organomics.
- Philosophie der Medizin, 1809 – The philosophy of medicine.
- Kritik der Lehre von den Geschlechtern der Pflanze, (1812, two sequels in 1814 and 1823) – Criticism of the doctrine on the sexes of plants.
- Von der Sexualität der Planzen: Studien (with August Wilhelm Henschel) 1820 – On the sexuality of plants.
- Lebens- und Formgeschichte der Pflanzenwelt (volume 1), 1822 – Life and form history of the plant world.
