= Shinobu Akiyama =

Japanese botanist

Shinobu Akiyama (秋山 忍 born 1957) is a Japanese botanist who works at the Tsukuba Botanical Garden studying the taxonomy of spermatophytes, particularly in the Tibetan Plateau and Himalayan Mountains The standard author abbreviation S.Akiyama is used to indicate this person as the author when citing a botanical name. As of March 2019, she is the author or one of the authors of 170 taxon names in the International Plant Names Index.

== Works ==
- Akiyama, Shinobu (1988). Revision of the genus lespedeza section macrolespedeza. Univ Of Tokyo Press. ISBN 9780860084297. OCLC 233618928.
- Akiyama, Shinobu; Watson, Mark F (2011). Flora of Nepal. Vol. 3 Vol. 3. Royal Botanic Garden Edinburgh. ISBN 9781906129798. OCLC 838869663.
- Akiyama, Shinobu (2004). Proceedings of the Fifth and Sixth Symposia on Collection Building and Natural History Studies in Asia and the Pacific Rim. National Science Museum. OCLC 767540256.
- Akiyama, Shinobu; Ōba, Hideaki (2001). Catalogue of the type specimens preserved in the Herbarium, Department of Botany, the University Museum, the University of Tokyo. Part 8, Part 8. The Museum. OCLC 864699844.
- Akiyama, Shinobu; Ohba, Hideaki (2001). Violaceae. OCLC 174879092.
- Akiyama, Shinobu; Ohba, Hideaki (1985). "The branching of the inflorescence and vegetative shoot and taxonomy of the genusKummerowia (Leguminosae)". The Botanical Magazine Tokyo. 98 (2): 137–150. doi:10.1007/BF02488793. ISSN 0006-808X. OCLC 4654828570. S2CID 32514671.
