= Jelinger Symons (botanist) =

Jelinger Symons (1778, Low Leyton, Essex – 20 May 1851, London) was an Anglican rector and amateur botanist.

Symons matriculated in July 1793 at St John's College, Cambridge. He graduated there with B.A. in 1797 and M.A. in 1800. He was ordained as deacon in Durham on 29 January 1799 and as priest in September 1801. In 1799 he became the curate of Whitburn, County Durham, where his father, Jelinger Symonds (1748–1810), was the rector from 1791 to 1810. The younger Jelinger Symons was from 1808 to 1851 the vicar of Monkland, Herefordshire and from 1833 to 1851 the rector of Radnage, Buckinghamshire. Symons served as a chaplain in 1809 to parishioners in West Ilsley, Berkshire and in 1821 to British residents in Boulogne-sur-Mer, France. He was J.P. for Hereford.

He was elected a Fellow of the Linnean Society in 1798. His only natural history publication was Synopsis Plantarum Insulis Britannicis Indigenarum, published in 1798 by John White in Fleet Street. Jelinger Symons, the younger, married Maria Henrietta Airey in January 1805 in Durham. Jelinger Cookson Symons was their son.
