= List of botanists by author abbreviation (W–Z) =

This is an incomplete list of botanists by their author abbreviation, which is designed for citation with the botanical names or works that they have published. This list follows that established by Brummitt & Powell (1992). Use of that list is recommended by Rec. 46A Note 1 of the International Code of Nomenclature for algae, fungi, and plants. The list is kept up to date online at The International Plant Names Index and Index Fungorum.

In some cases an "author abbreviation" consists of a full surname, while in other cases the surname is abbreviated and/or accompanied by one or more initials. There is no space between the initials and the surname (or its abbreviation).

==== Order of entries ====
The list here is maintained strictly in order of the alphabetic characters in the abbreviation; thus "A.B.Jacks." appears under "A" not "J", and is located as if the characters were "ABJACKS". Capitalization is ignored as are all non-alphabetic characters such as "." and space. Diacritical marks are also ignored, so that, e.g., "ü" is treated as if it were "u".

==== Navigation ====
Because of its length, the list is split across separate pages. All alphabetic sections can be accessed from the short table of contents; the vertical bars show the page divisions. Searching will only find an entry within a page.

== A–V ==
Contents:	A	B	C	D	E F	G	H	I J	K L	M	N O	P	Q R	S	T U V	W X Y Z

To find entries for A–V, use the table of contents above.

== W ==
Contents: Top	A	B	C	D	E F	G	H	I J	K L	M	N O	P	Q R	S	T U V	W X Y Z

- W.A.Archer – William Andrew Archer (1894–1973)
- W.A.Bell – Walter Andrew Bell (1889–1969)
- W.A.Clark – William Andrew Clark (1911–1983)
- W.A.Clarke – William Ambrose Clarke (1841–1911)
- Waddell – Coslett Herbert Waddell (1858–1919)
- Wade – Walter Wade (1760–1825)
- Wadhwa – Brij Mohan Wadhwa (1933–2009)
- Wad.Khan – M. A. Wadood Khan (1944–2023)
- Waga – Jakub Ignacy Waga (1800–1872)
- Wagenitz – Gerhard Wagenitz (1927–2017)
- Wagstaff – Steven J. Wagstaff (fl. 1998)
- Wahl – Herbert Alexander Wahl (1900–1975)
- Wahlenb. – Göran Wahlenberg (1780–1851)
- Waisb. – Anton Waisbecker (1835–1916)
- Waldst. – Franz de Paula Adam von Waldstein (1759–1823)
- Wall. – Nathaniel Wallich (1786–1854)
- Wallace – Alfred Russel Wallace (1823–1913)
- Wallander – Eva Wallander (born 1968)
- Wallays – Antoine Charles François Wallays (1812–1888)
- Wallenwein – Fritz Wallenwein (fl. 2012)
- Wallerius – Johan Gottschalk Wallerius (1709–1785)
- Walleyn – Ruben Walleyn (1966–2008)
- Wallis – Gustav Wallis (1830–1878)
- Wallman – Johan Haquin Wallman (1792–1853)
- Walln. – Anton Wallnöfer (fl. 1888)
- Wallner – Joseph Wallner (1909–1935)
- Wallossek – Christoph Wallossek (fl. 1999)
- Wallr. – Karl Friedrich Wilhelm Wallroth (1792–1857)
- Wallwork – H. Wallwork (fl. 1988)
- Walp. – Wilhelm Gerhard Walpers (1816–1853)
- Walsh-Held – Maria Ernestine Walsh-Held (1881–1973)
- Walter – Thomas Walter (1740–1789)
- Walters – Stuart Max Walters (1920–2005)
- Walther – Friedrich Ludwig Walther (1759–1824)
- Wand. – Maria das Graças Lapa Wanderley (born 1947)
- W.Anderson – William Anderson (1750–1778)
- Wangenh. – Friedrich Adam Julius von Wangenheim (1749–1800)
- Wangerin – Walther Wangerin (1884–1938)
- Wanggai – Jack Wanggai (fl. 2000)
- Wapstra – Mark Wapstra (born 1971)
- Warb. – Otto Warburg (1859–1938)
- W.Archer – William Archer (1830–1897)
- W.Archer bis – William Archer (1820–1874)
- Ward – Lester Frank Ward (1841–1913)
- Ward.-Johnson – Greg Wardell-Johnson (fl. 1996)
- Warder – John Aston Warder (1812–1883)
- Wardle – Peter Wardle (1931–2008)
- Warion – (Jean Pierre) Adrien Warion (1837–1880)
- Warm. – Johannes Eugenius Bülow Warming (1841–1924)
- Warner – Richard Warner (c. 1711 to 1713–1775)
- Warnock – Barton Holland Warnock (1911–1998)
- Warnst. – Carl Friedrich Warnstorf (1837–1921)
- W.A.Rodrigues – William Antônio Rodrigues (born 1928)
- Warsz. – Józef Warszewicz Ritter von Rawicz (1812–1866)
- Wassh. – Dieter Carl Wasshausen (born 1938)
- Watan. – Kiyohiko Watanabe (1900–2000)
- Waterh. – Benjamin Waterhouse (1754–1846)
- Watling – Roy Watling (born 1938)
- Watson – William Watson (1715–1787) (see also the abbreviation "W.Watson")
- Watt – David Allan Poe Watt (1830–1917)
- Watts – William Walter Watts (1856–1920)
- W.A.Weber – William Alfred Weber (1918–2020)
- Wawra – Heinrich Wawra von Fernsee (1831–1887)
- W.Bartram – William Bartram (1739–1823)
- W.B.Carp. – William Benjamin Carpenter (1813–1885)
- W.B.Clarke – Walter Bosworth Clarke (1879–1953)
- W.B.Drew – William Brooks Drew (1908–1997)
- W.Becker – Wilhelm Becker (1874–1928)
- W.Boott – William Boott (1805–1887)
- W.Br. – William Brown (1888–1975)
- W.B.Schofield – Wilfred Borden Schofield (1927–2008)
- W.Bull – William Bull (1828–1902)
- W.C.Barton – William Charles Barton (1874–1955)
- W.C.Cheng – Wan Chun Cheng (1904–1983)
- W.C.Huang – Wei Chang Huang (fl. 2013)
- W.C.Martin – William Clarence Martin (1923–2010)
- W.Cooper – William Cooper (1798–1864)
- W.D.Clark – W. Dennis Clark (born 1948)
- W.Deane – Walter Deane (1848–1930)
- W.D.Francis – William Douglas Francis (1889–1959)
- W.D.Hawth. – William D. Hawthorne (fl. 2006)
- W.Dietr. – Werner Dietrich (1938–2011)
- W.D.J.Koch – Wilhelm Daniel Joseph Koch (1771–1849)
- Weakley – Alan Stuart Weakley (born 1957)
- Weath. – Charles Alfred Weatherby (1875–1949)
- Weatherwax – Paul Weatherwax (1888–1976)
- Webb – Philip Barker Webb (1793–1854)
- Weber – Georg Heinrich Weber (1752–1828), often written G.H. Weber
- Weberb. – Augusto Weberbauer (1871–1948)
- W.E.Cooper – Wendy Elizabeth Cooper (born 1953)
- Wedd. – Hugh Algernon Weddell (1819–1877)
- Wedem. – Wedemeyer (fl. before 1803)
- W.E.Evans – William Edgar Evans (1882–1963)
- Weeras. – Aruna Dharmapriya Weerasooriya (born 1962)
- Wege – Juliet Wege (born 1971)
- W.E.Higgins – Wesley Ervin Higgins (born 1949)
- Weibel – Raymond Weibel (1905–1992)
- Weidman – Frederick DeForest Weidman (1881–1956)
- Weigel – Christian Ehrenfried von Weigel (1748–1831)
- Weihe – Carl Ernst August Weihe (1779–1834)
- Weiller – Marc Weiller (1880–1945)
- Weim. – August Henning Weimarck (1903–1980)
- Weinm. – Johann Anton Weinmann (1782–1858)
- Wei Wang – Wei Wang (fl. 2009)
- W.E.Lawr. – William Evans Lawrence (1883–1950)
- Wellard – Blake Wellard (born 1987)
- Wells – Bertram Whittier Wells (1884–1978)
- Welw. – Friedrich Welwitsch (1806–1872)
- Welzen – Peter C. van Welzen (born 1958)
- W.E.Manning – Wayne Eyer Manning (1899–2004)
- Wendelbo – Per Erland Berg Wendelbo (1927–1981)
- Wender. – Georg Wilhelm Franz Wenderoth (1774–1861)
- Went – Friedrich August Ferdinand Christian Went (1863–1935)
- Werderm. – Erich Werdermann (1892–1959)
- Wercklé – Karl Wercklé (1860-1924)
- Wernek. – Franz Wernekinck (1764–1839)
- Werner – Roger-Guy Werner (1901–1977)
- Wernham – Herbert Fuller Wernham (1879–1941)
- W.E.Rogers – Walter E. Rogers (1890–1951)
- Wesm. – Alfred Wesmael (1832–1905)
- Wess.Boer – Jan Gerard Wessels Boer (1936–2019)
- West – William West (1848–1914)
- Westc. – Frederic Westcott (died 1861)
- Wester – Peter Jansen Wester (1877–1931)
- Westerd. – Johanna Westerdijk (1883–1961)
- Weston – Richard Weston (c. 1733–1806)
- Wetschnig – Wolfgang Wetschnig (born 1958)
- Wettst. – Richard Wettstein (1863–1931)
- Weyer – William John Bates van de Weyer (1870–1946)
- Weyland – Hermann Gerhard Weyland (1888–1974)
- W.F.Barker – Winsome Fanny ('Buddy') Barker (1907–1994)
- W.F.Hillebr. – William Francis Hillebrand (1853–1925)
- W.Fitzg. – William Vincent Fitzgerald (1867–1929)
- W.Gams – Walter Gams (1934–2017)
- W.G.Jones – W.G. Jones (fl. 1995)
- W.G.Lee – William George Lee (born 1950)
- W.G.Schneid. – Wilhelm Gottlieb Schneider (1814–1889)
- W.Gümbel – Wilhelm Theodor Gümbel (1812–1858)
- W.H.Adey – Walter H. Adey (born 1934)
- W.Harris – Warwick Harris (born 1940)
- W.H.Baker – William Hudson Baker (1911–1985)
- W.H.Baxter – William Hart Baxter (1816–1890)
- W.H.Brewer – William Henry Brewer (1828–1910)
- W.H.Duncan – Wilbur Howard Duncan (1910–2005)
- Wheeler - Elisabeth Wheeler (born 1944)
- Wherry – Edgar Theodore Wherry (1885–1982)
- W.H.Gibson – William Hamilton Gibson (1850–1896)
- Whibley – David John Edward Whibley (1936–2002)
- Whiffin – Trevor Paul Whiffin (born 1947)
- W.Hill – Walter Hill (1820–1904)
- Whipple – Amiel Weeks Whipple (1816–1863)
- Whistler – W. Arthur Whistler (1944–2020)
- Whitaker – Thomas Wallace Whitaker
- Whitehouse – Eula Whitehouse (1892–1974)
- Whitel. – Thomas Whitelegge (1850–1927)
- Whitlock – Barbara Ann Whitlock (born 1967)
- Whitmore – Timothy Charles Whitmore (1935–2002)
- Whittall – Edward Whittall (1851–1917)
- W.H.Lang – William Henry Lang (1874–1960)
- W.H.Lewis – Walter Hepworth Lewis (1930–2020)
- W.H.Mills – William Hobson Mills (1873–1959)
- W.Hook. – William Hooker (1779–1832)
- W.H.Rao – Wen Hui Rao (fl. 2010)
- W.H.Schopfer – William-Henri Schopfer (1900–1962)
- W.Hunter – William Hunter (1755–1812)
- W.H.Wagner – Warren Herbert Wagner (1920–2000)
- W.H.Welch – Winona Hazel Welch (1896–1990)
- Wibel – August Wilhelm Eberhard Christoph Wibel (1775–1814)
- Wich. – Max Ernst Wichura (1817–1866)
- Wickens – Gerald Ernest Wickens (1927–2019)
- Widder – Felix Joseph Widder (1892–1974)
- Wieboldt – Thomas F. Wieboldt (fl. 1992)
- Wiedem. – Ferdinand Johann Wiedemann (1805–1887)
- Wied-Neuw. – Maximilian Alexander Philipp zu Wied-Neuwied (1782–1867)
- Wiegand – Karl McKay Wiegand (1873–1942)
- Wiehe – Paul Octave Wiehe (1910–1975)
- Wieland – George Reber Wieland (1865–1953)
- Wiens – Delbert Wiens (born 1932)
- Wiersema – John H. Wiersema (born 1950)
- Wierzb. – Piotr Pawlus (Peter (Petrus) Paulus) Wierzbicki (1794–1847)
- Wigand – Julius Wilhelm Albert Wigand (1821–1886)
- Wigg. – Friedrich Heinrich Wiggers (1746–1811)
- Wiggins – Ira Loren Wiggins (1899–1987)
- Wigglesw. – Grace Wigglesworth (1877–1944 (or later))
- Wight – Robert Wight (1796–1872)
- Wightman – Glenn M. Wightman (born 1961)
- Wijnands – D. Onno Wijnands (1945–1993)
- Wikstr. – Johan Emanuel Wikström (1789–1856)
- Wilbr. – Johann Bernhard Wilbrand (1779–1846)
- Wilbur – Robert Lynch Wilbur (1925–2022)
- Wilcock – Christopher C. Wilcock (born 1946)
- Wilczek – Ernst Wilczek (1867–1948)
- Wild – Hiram Wild (1917–1982)
- Wildpret – Wolfredo Wildpret de la Torre (born 1933)
- Wilensky – Dmitry G. Wilensky (1892–1959)
- Wilh. – Gottlieb Tobias Wilhelm (1758–1811)
- Wilken – Dieter H. Wilken (born 1944)
- Wilkes – Charles Wilkes (1798–1877)
- Will. – William Crawford Williamson (1816–1895)
- Willd. – Carl Ludwig von Willdenow (1765–1812)
- Wille – Johan Nordal Fischer Wille (1858–1924)
- Willemet – (Pierre) Remi Willemet (1735–1807)
- Williams – Samuel Williams (1743–1817)
- Willis – John Christopher Willis (1868–1958)
- Willk. – Heinrich Moritz Willkomm (1821–1895)
- Wilmot-Dear – Christine Melanie Wilmot-Dear (born 1952)
- Wilmott – Alfred James Wilmott (1888–1950)
- Wilson – William M. Wilson (1799–1871)
- Wimm. – Christian Friedrich Heinrich Wimmer (1803–1868)
- Winch – Nathaniel John Winch (1768–1838)
- Windham – Michael D. Windham (born 1954)
- Windsor – John Windsor (1787–1868)
- Wingf. – Robert C. Wingfield (born 1936)
- Winka – Katarina Winka (born 1970)
- Winterl – Jacob Joseph Winterl (1739–1809)
- Wipff – Joseph K. Wipff (born 1962)
- Wirtg. – Philipp Wilhelm Wirtgen (1806–1870)
- Wisl. – Friedrich(Frederick) Adolph Wislizenus (1810–1889)
- Wistuba – Andreas Wistuba (born 1967)
- Wisura – Walter Wisura (fl. 1993)
- Witasek – Johanna A. Witasek (1865–1910)
- With. – William Withering (1741–1799)
- Witham – Henry Thomas Maire Silvertop Witham (1779–1844)
- Withner – Carl Leslie Withner (1918–2012)
- Wittm. – Ludwig Wittmack (1839–1929)
- Wittr. – Veit Brecher Wittrock (1839–1914)
- Wittst. – Georg Christian Wittstein (1810–1887)
- W.Jacobsen – Werner Bahne Georg Jacobsen (1909–1995)
- W.Jameson – William Jameson (1815–1882)
- W.J.Baker – William John Baker (born 1972)
- W.J.de Wilde – Willem Jan Jacobus Oswald de Wilde (1936–2021)
- W.J.Hess – William John Hess (1934–2021)
- W.J.Martin – Weston Joseph Martin (born 1917)
- W.J.McDonald – William J. McDonald (fl. 2000)
- W.J.Robbins – William Jacob Robbins (1890–1978)
- W.J.Zinger – Vasily Jakovlevich Zinger (1836–1907)
- W.K.Harris – Wayne K. Harris (1939–2020)
- W.Kittr. – Walter Kittredge (born 1953)
- W.L.Clement – Wendy L. Clement (fl. 2009)
- W.L.Culb. – William Louis Culberson (1929–2003)
- W.L.E.Schmidt – Wilhelm Ludwig Ewald Schmidt (1804–1843)
- W.Lippert – Wolfgang Lippert (1937–2018)
- W.Lodd. – W. Loddiges (fl. 1823)
- W.L.Wagner – Warren Lambert Wagner (born 1950)
- W.L.White – William Lawrence White (1908–1952)
- W.MacGill. – William MacGillivray (1796–1852)
- W.Martin – William Martin (1886–1975)
- W.Mast. – William Masters (1796–1874)
- W.M.Curtis – Winifred Mary Curtis (1905–2005)
- W.M.Lin – Wei Min Lin (fl. 2006)
- W.N.Cheesman – William Norwood Cheesman (1847–1925)
- W.N.Powell – William Nottingham Powell (1904–1990)
- W.N.Takeuchi – Wayne N. Takeuchi (born 1952)
- Wodehouse – Roger Philip Wodehouse (1889–1978)
- W.O.Dietr. – Wilhelm Otto Dietrich (1881–1964)
- Wolf – Nathanael Matthaeus von Wolf (1724–1784)
- Woll. — George Buchanan Wollaston (1814–1899)
- Wolle – Francis Wolle (1817–1893)
- Wollenw. – Hans Wilhelm Wollenweber (1879–1949)
- Wolley-Dod – Anthony Hurt Wolley-Dod (1861–1948)
- W.O.Müll. – Walther Otto Müller (1833–1887)
- Wood – William Wood (1745–1808)
- Woodcock – Hubert Bayley Drysdale Woodcock (1867–1957)
- Woodrow – George Marshall Woodrow (1846–1911)
- Woodson – Robert Everard Woodson (1904–1963)
- Woodv. – William Woodville (1752–1805)
- Woodw. – Thomas Jenkinson Woodward (1745–1820)
- Woolls – William Woolls (1814–1893)
- Woolward – Florence Helen Woolward (1854–1936)
- Wooton – Elmer Otis Wooton (1865–1945)
- Wormsk. – Morten Wormskjold (1783–1845)
- Woronow – Yury Nikolaevich Voronov (also spelt as Georg or Jurij Nikolaewitch Woronow) (1874–1931)
- Worsley – Arthington Worsley (1861–1944)
- Woyn. – Heinrich Karl Woynar (1865–1917)
- W.Palmer – William Palmer (1856–1921)
- W.P.Armstr. – Wayne Paul Armstrong (born 1941)
- W.Parry – William Edward Parry (1790–1855)
- W.P.C.Barton – William Paul Crillon Barton (1786–1856)
- W.Peck – William Dandridge Peck (1763–1822)
- W.Penn. – Winifred Ann Pennington (Tutin) (1915–2007)
- W.Petz. – (Karl) Wilhelm Petzold (1848–1897)
- W.P.Fang – Wen-Pei Fang (1899–1983)
- W.Phillips – William Phillips (1822–1905)
- W.P.Teschner – Walter Paul Teschner (born 1927)
- W.Q.Zhu – Wei-Qing Zhu (fl. 1999)
- Wraber – Tone Wraber (1938–2010)
- W.R.Abraham – Wolf Rainer Abraham (born 1952)
- W.R.Anderson – William Russell Anderson (1942–2013)
- W.R.Barker – William Robert Barker (born 1948)
- W.R.B.Oliv. – Walter Reginald Brook Oliver (1883–1957)
- W.R.Buck – William Russel Buck (born 1950)
- W.Remy – Winfried Remy (1924–1995)
- W.R.Ernst – Wallace Roy Ernst (1928–1971)
- W.Rich – William Rich (1800–1864)
- Wright – John Wright (1811–1846)
- W.R.Linton – William Richardson Linton (1850–1908)
- W.R.Price – William Robert Price (1886–1975)
- W.R.Taylor – William Randolph Taylor (1895–1990)
- W.S.Alverson – William Surprison Alverson (born 1953)
- W.Saunders – William Saunders (1822–1900)
- W.Schmidt – Wilhelm Schmidt (fl. 1927)
- W.Schnizl. – Karl Friedrich Chrisoph Wilhelm Schnizlein (1780–1856)
- W.Schultze-Motel – Wolfram Schultze-Motel (1934–2011)
- W.S.Cooper – William Skinner Cooper (1884–1978)
- W.Seem. – Wilhelm Eduard Gottfried Seemann (died 1868)
- W.Siev. – Wilhelm Sievers (1860–1921)
- W.S.Stewart – William Sheldon Stewart (1914–1997)
- W.Stone – Witmer Stone (1866–1939)
- W.Suarez – Wally Suarez (born 1977)
- W.T.Aiton – William Townsend Aiton (1766–1849)
- W.T.Davis – William Thompson Davis (1862–1945)
- W.T.Gordon – William Thomas Gordon (1884–1950)
- W.Thomps. – William Thompson (1823–1903)
- W.Till – Walter Till (born 1956)
- W.T.Marshall – William Taylor Marshall (1886–1957)
- W.Theob. – William Theobald (1829–1908)
- W.T.Wang – Wen Tsai Wang (1926–2022)
- Wulfen – Franz Xaver von Wulfen (1728–1805)
- Wullschl. – Heinrich Wullschlägel (1805–1864)
- Wunderlin – Richard P. Wunderlin (born 1939)
- Wurdack – John Julius Wurdack (1921–1998)
- Wurmb – Friedrich von Wurmb (1742–1781)
- Württemb. – Prince Friedrich Paul Wilhelm von Württemberg (1797–1860)
- Wüstnei – Karl Georg Gustav Wüstnei (1810–1858)
- W.Watson – William Watson (1858–1925) (see also the abbreviation "Watson")
- W.Wendte – William Wendte (1877–1904)
- W.West – William West Jr (1875–1901)
- W.Wettst. – Wolfgang Wettstein (born 1898)
- W.Wight – William Franklin Wight (1874–1954)
- W.Wolf – Wolfgang Wolf (1875–1950)
- W.W.Payne – Willard William Payne (born 1937)
- W.Wright – William Wright (1735–1819)
- W.W.Sm. – William Wright Smith (1875–1956)
- Wyatt-Sm. – John Wyatt-Smith (1917–2002)
- Wydler – Heinrich Wydler (1800–1883)
- W.Y.Hsia – Wei Ying Hsia (1896–1987)
- W.Zimm. – Walter Max Zimmerman (1892–1980)

== X ==
Contents: Top	A	B	C	D	E F	G	H	I J	K L	M	N O	P	Q R	S	T U V	W X Y Z

- X.D.Liu – Liu Xiaodong (fl. 1976)
- X.F.Gao – Xin Fen Gao (born 1965)
- X.H.Jin – Xiao Hua Jin (born 1975)
- Xiao X.Zhou – Xiao Xu Zhou (fl. 2020)
- Xi L.Wang – Xi Long Wang (fl. 2019)
- Xin Y.Chen – Xin Yan Chen (fl. 2019)
- X.J.Ge – Xue Jun Ge (fl. 2001)
- X.J.Xue – Xiang Ji Xue (fl. 1983)
- X.Q.Song – Xi Qiang Song (fl. 2008)
- X.Y.Huang – Xin Yi Huang (fl. 2015)
- X.Y.Zhu – Xiang Yun Zhu (born 1964)

== Y ==
Contents: Top	A	B	C	D	E F	G	H	I J	K L	M	N O	P	Q R	S	T U V	W X Y Z

- Yakovlev – Gennady Pavlovic Yakovlev (1934–2024)
- Yamam. – Yoshimatsu Yamamoto (1893–1947)
- Yan Liu – Yan Liu (fl. 2003)
- Yasuda – Atsushi Yasuda (1868–1924)
- Yatabe – Ryôkichi Yatabe (1851–1899)
- Yates – Lorenzo Gordin Yates (1837–1909)
- Y.Baba – Yumiko Baba (fl. 2012)
- Y.B.Luo – Yi Bo Luo (born 1964)
- Y.C.F.Su – Yvonne C.F. Su (fl. 2001)
- Y.C.Wu – Yin Chan Wu (1901–1950)
- Y.C.Yang – Yung Chang Yang (born 1927)
- Yen C.Yang – Yen Chin Yang (1913–1984)
- Yeo – Peter Frederick Yeo (1929–2010)
- Y.F.Deng – Yun Fei Deng (fl. 2001)
- Y.Hesl.-Harr. – Yolande Heslop-Harrison (fl. 1968)
- Y.H.Tan – Yun Hong Tan (fl. 2012)
- Y.H.Tong – Yi-Hua Tong (fl. 2013)
- Yii – P.C. Yii (fl. 2001)
- Ying Qin – Ying Qin (fl. 2018)
- Y.Itô – Yoshi Itô (1907–1992)
- Y.Kimura – Yojiro Kimura (1912–2006)
- Y.K.Yang – Yong Kang Yang (fl. 1987)
- Y.L.Chen – Yi Ling Chen (1930–2022)
- Y.M.Ye – Yin Min Ye (born 1929)
- Y.N.Lee – Yong No Lee (1920–2008)
- Yohannan – Regy Yohannan (fl. 2012)
- Yokota – Masatsugu Yokota (born 1955)
- Yo.Tanaka – Yoshio Tanaka (1838–1916)
- Y.P.Ng – Yan Peng Ng
- Ysabeau – Alexandre Victor Frédéric Ysabeau (1793–1873)
- Y.Sasaki – Yoshiyuki Sasaki (1926–1972)
- Y.Sawa – Yutaka Sawa (fl. 2006)
- Y.S.Chen – You Sheng Chen (fl. 2003)
- Y.Schouten – Y. Schouten (fl. 1985)
- Y.S.Kim – Yun Shik Kim (born 1934)
- Y.S.Wang – Yu Sheng Wang (fl. 1985)
- Y.T.Chang – Yong Tian Chang (born 1936)
- Yudistira – Yuda Rehata Yudistira (fl. 2020)
- Yu Ito – Yu Ito (born 1981)
- Yunck. – Truman George Yuncker (1891–1964)
- Yu.Tanaka – Yuichiro Tanaka (1901–1983)
- Y.W.Low – Yee Wen Low (born 1981)
- Y.W.Zhang – Yu Wu Zhang (fl. 2001)
- Y.Y.Fang – Yun Yi Fang (born 1916)
- Y.Z.Zhao – Yi Zhi Zhao (born 1939)

== Z ==
Contents: Top	A	B	C	D	E F	G	H	I J	K L	M	N O	P	Q R	S	T U V	W X Y Z

- Zabel – Hermann Zabel (1832–1912)
- Zahlbr. – Alexander Zahlbruckner (1860–1938)
- Zahn – Karl Hermann Zahn (1865–1940)
- Zajac – Milan Zajac (fl. 2022)
- Zämelis – Aleksandrs Zämelis (1897–1943)
- Zanardini – Giovanni Antonio Maria Zanardini (1804–1878)
- Zanoni – Thomas A. Zanoni (born 1949)
- Zanted. – Giovanni Zantedeschi (1773–1846)
- Zapał. – Hugo Zapałowicz (1852–1917)
- Zappi – Daniela Cristina Zappi (born 1965)
- Zardini – Elsa Matilde Zardini (1949–2020)
- Zarrei – Mehdi Zarrei (born 1979)
- Zaw. – Aleksander Zawadzki (1798–1868)
- Zaytzeva – Ekaterina Sergeevna Zaytzeva (born 1968)
- Z.Collins – Zacchaeus Collins (1764–1831)
- Z.D.Chen – Zhi Duan Chen (born 1964)
- Zea – Francisco Antonio Zea (1770–1822)
- Zeile – Elsie May Zeile (1870–1940)
- Zeiller – Charles René Zeiller (1847–1915)
- Zelený – Václav Zelený (1936–2020)
- Zenari – Silvia Zenari (1896–1956)
- Zenker – Jonathan Carl Zenker (1799–1837)
- Zenkert – Charles Anthony Zenkert (1886–1972)
- Zepern. – Bernhard Zepernick (1926–2019)
- Zerova – Marija Ja. (Mariya Ya.) Zerova (1902–1994)
- Zeyh. – Karl Ludwig Philipp Zeyher (1799–1858)
- Zhao – Yu Tang Zhao (1932–2010)
- Zhebrak – Anton Romanovich Zhebrak (1901–1965)
- Z.H.Pan – Ze Hui Pan (born 1938)
- Z.H.Tsi – Zhan Huo Tsi (1937–2001)
- Zhuk. – Peter Mikhailovich Zhukovsky (1888–1975)
- Z.H.Yang – Zen Hong Yang (fl. 1988)
- Zich – Frank Zich (born 1968)
- Ziel. – Jerzy Zieliński (born 1943)
- Zijp – Coenraad van Zijp (born 1879)
- Zimm. – Philipp Wilhelm Albrecht Zimmermann (1860–1931)
- Zimmerm. – Walter Max Zimmerman (1892–1980)
- Zimmeter – Albert Zimmeter (1848–1897)
- Zinn – Johann Gottfried Zinn (1727–1759)
- Zipp. – Alexander Zippelius (1797–1828)
- Z.Iwats. – Zennoske Iwatsuki (1929–2015)
- Ziz – Johann Baptist Ziz (1779–1829)
- Zizka – Georg Zizka (born 1955)
- Z.J.Liu – Zhong Jian Liu (born 1958)
- Z.L.Chen – Zong Lian Chen (fl. 1985)
- Zohary – Michael Zohary (1898–1983)
- Zoll. – Heinrich Zollinger (1818–1859)
- Zoller – Heinrich Zoller (1923–2009)
- Zona – Scott Zona (born 1959)
- Zonn. – Ben Zonneveld (born 1940)
- Zopf – Friedrich (or Friederich) Wilhelm Zopf (1846–1909)
- Zorn – Johannes Zorn (1739–1799)
- Zotov – Victor Dmitrievich Zotov (1908 –1977)
- Z.Plobsh. – Friedrich August Zorn von Plobsheim (1711–1789)
- Z.P.Wang – Zheng Ping Wang (born 1929)
- Z.R.He - Zhao Rong He (fl. 1998)
- Z.S.Rogers – Zachary Scott Rogers (born 1976)
- Zucc. – Joseph Gerhard Zuccarini (1790–1848)
- Zuccagni – Attilio Zuccagni (1754–1807)
- Zuloaga – Fernando Omar Zuloaga (born 1951)
- Zwanziger – Gustav Adolf Zwanziger (1837–1893)
- Zycha – Herbert Zycha (1903–1998)
- Z.Y.Zhu – Zheng Yin Zhu (born 1944)

== See also ==
- List of South African plant botanical authors
- List of botanists
- Category:Botanists
- List of Russian botanists
- List of zoologists by author abbreviation
