= Zeile =

Zeile is a surname. Notable people with the surname include:

- Elsie May Zeile (1885–1988), American botanist
- Magnus Zeile (born 1968), Swedish tennis player
- Todd Zeile (born 1965), American baseball player

== See also ==
- Zeiler
- Zeiller
