= Schöpfer =

Schöpfer or Schoepfer is a German topographic name, which means a person who lived by or in a shed, from the Middle High German schopf ("shed"). The surname may refer to:

- Abraham Schöpfer, German painter
- Ida Schöpfer (1929–2014), Swiss alpine skier
- Jean Schopfer (1868–1931), French tennis player and writer
- Katie Schoepfer (born 1988), American soccer player
- William-Henri Schopfer (1900–1962), Swiss botanist
