= Julius Gerhardt =

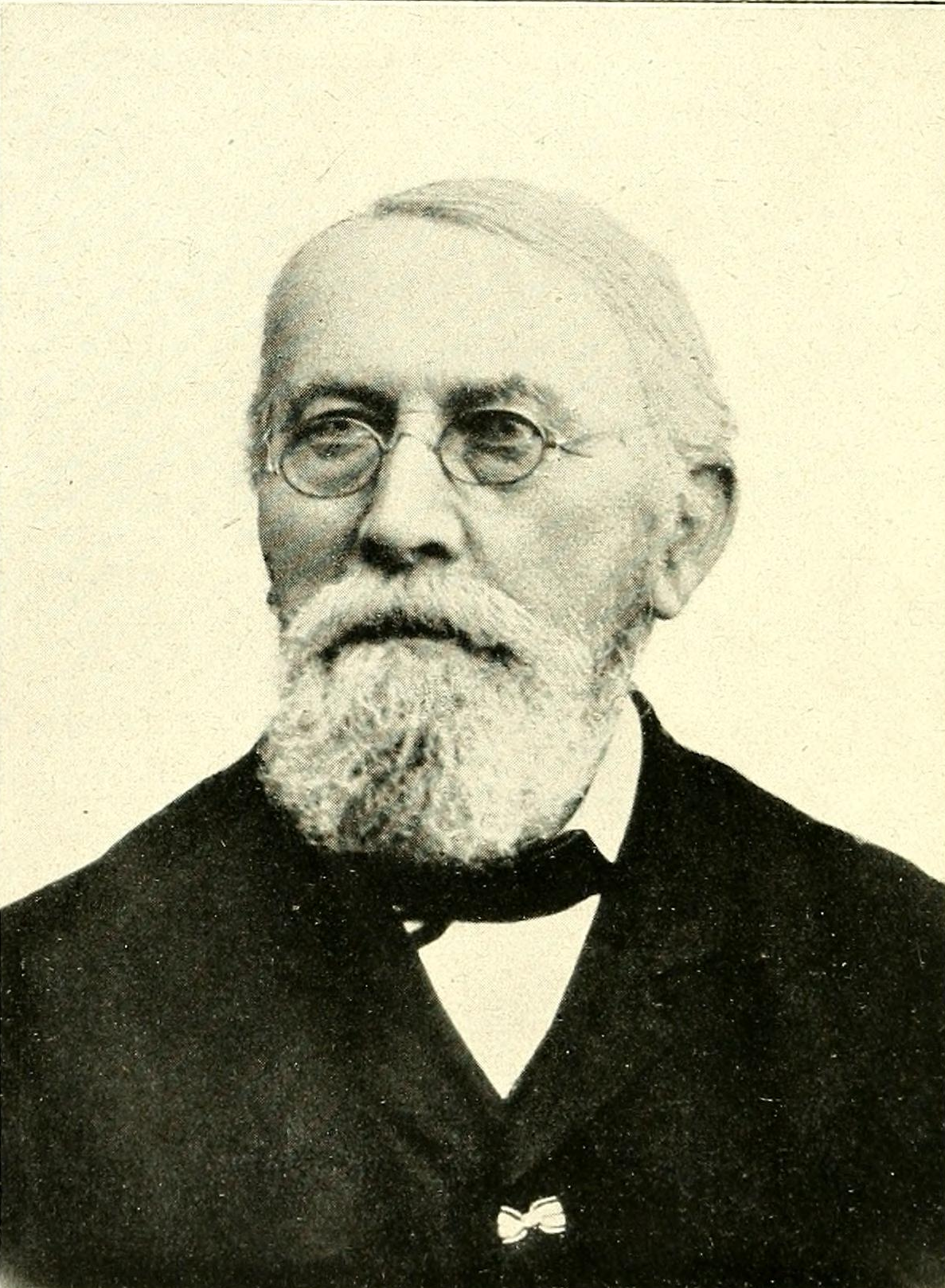

Julius Gerhardt (18 January 1827 – 18 November 1912) was a Silesian entomologist, botanist and high-school teacher. He studied the plants and later the beetles of the Silesian region and described a number of species.

== Life and work ==
Gerhardt was born in Buchwald, Silesia, Austrian Empire (now Bukówka, Lower Silesian Voivodeship, Poland), son of a shoemaker. Growing up in Kirchdorf, he took a keen interest in natural history from an early age, making trips with his father into the woods. He received drawing lessons for nine years in the Buchwald castle alongside Caroline von Riedesel. He became interested in botany with encouragement from Theodor Eisenmenger. At the age of twelve, Gerhardt had a herbarium of 200 species. He studied Latin from Pastor Haupt. Another influence was a teacher in Hermdorf named Pohl. Gerhard spent time from 1845 to 1847 studying the plants around Bunzlau (now Bolesławiec). From 1847, he worked as a teacher in Kunitz (now Kunice near Legnica). Here he met Emil Postel, a botanist who had studied the plants of Parchwitz (now Prochowice), and they spent Sundays examining the local flora. They came in contact with Friedrich Wimmer, an authority on Silesian botany and the headmaster of a Gymnasium in Breslau. Gerhardt then became a member of the Silesian Society to which he contributed notes on his studies.

In the 1870s Gerhardt sold his herbarium of nearly 1700 species to Wilhelm Gottlieb Schneider. He then shifted to focus on the local mushrooms and fungi. Joseph Schröter named a species found near Liegnitz after him, Physoderma Gerhardti. He also discovered other plants in the area, a Rubus was named after him as was a Carex by local botanist named Fiegert. He received a silver medal for exhibiting six folio volumes of the plants of Liegnitz at an exhibition in 1880. In 1885 he wrote the Flora von Liegnitz. Gerhardt simultaneously took an interest in beetles and began to publish in the Silesian Entomology Society from 1848 and contributed towards developing a catalogue of the beetles along with Karl Wilhelm Letzner. In 1860, he catalogued 3400 beetle species from Lower Silesia. Gerhardt also influenced his students Wilhelm Kolbe (1852–1929) and Richard Scholz (1866–1935) into becoming entomologists.

Gerhardt also took an interest in music and played Beethoven daily. In 1888, a bench was named after him along the climb from Buschhäuser to Heßberge by the mountain association. On his 80th birthday the Silesian Entomological Society made him an honorary member. He also received an Eagle award of the House Order of Hohenzollern. His beetle collections at the time of his death had 120,000 specimens of 8,000 species and were donated to the city along with his entomological library.

A number of beetles were named in his honour included Malthodes gerhardti, Limnebius gerhardti, and Zudectus gerhardti.
