= Erigeron davisii =

Scientific classification
- Kingdom: Plantae
- Clade: Tracheophytes
- Clade: Angiosperms
- Clade: Eudicots
- Clade: Asterids
- Order: Asterales
- Family: Asteraceae
- Genus: Erigeron
- Species: E. davisii

Binomial name
- Erigeron davisii (Cronquist) G.L.Nesom

Synonyms
- Synonymy: Erigeron engelmannii subsp. davisii Cronquist; Erigeron engelmannii var. davisii (Cronquist) Cronquist

Species of flowering plant

Erigeron davisii is a North American species of flowering plant in the family Asteraceae known by the common name Davis's fleabane . It has been found only in Idaho and in northeastern Oregon.

Erigeron davisii is a perennial herb up to 30 cm (12 inches) tall. Each branch generally has only one flower head, with 50–80 white ray florets and numerous yellow disc florets.
