= Zeiller =

Zeiller is a surname. Notable people with the surname include:

- Charles René Zeiller (1847–1915), French mining engineer and paleobotanist
- Johann Jakob Zeiller (1708–1783), Austrian painter
- Paul Zeiller (1658–1738), Austrian painter

== See also ==
- Zeiler
- Zeller (surname)
