= Armen Takhtajan =

Soviet-Armenian botanist (1910–2009)

- Արմեն Թախտաջյան (Armenian)
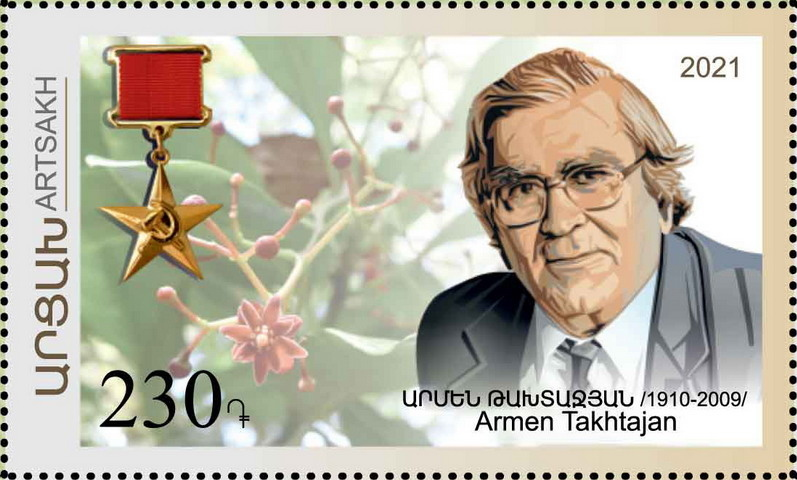
- Takhtajan on a 2021 stamp of Artsakh
- Born: 10 June 1910; Shusha, Elizavetpol Governorate, Russian Empire
- Died: 13 November 2009 (aged 99); Saint Petersburg, Russian Federation
- Citizenship: USSR
- Education: Yerevan State University
- Known for: "Takhtajan system" of flowering plant classification
- Children: Leon Takhtajan
- Scientific career
- Fields: Botany
- Workplaces: Yerevan State University; Leningrad University
- Author abbrev. (botany): Takht.

Signature
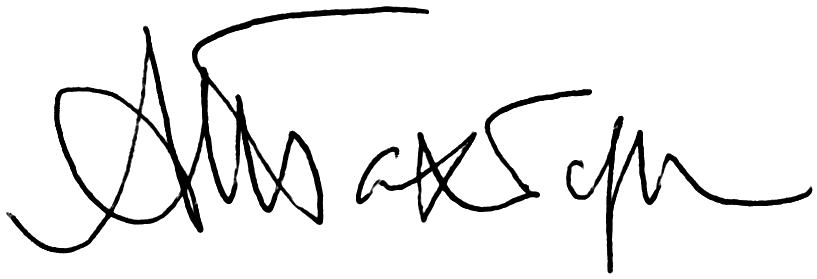

Armen Leonovich Takhtajan or Takhtajian (Note: surname also transliterated Takhtadjan, Takhtadzhi︠a︡n or Takhtadzhian) (Armenian: Արմեն Լևոնի Թախտաջյան; Russian: Армен Леонович Тахтаджян; pronounced takh-tuh-JAHN; 10 June 1910 – 13 November 2009), was a Soviet-Armenian botanist, one of the most important figures in 20th century plant evolution and systematics and biogeography. His other interests included morphology of flowering plants, paleobotany, and the flora of the Caucasus. He was one of the most influential taxonomists of the latter twentieth century.

== Life ==
=== Family ===
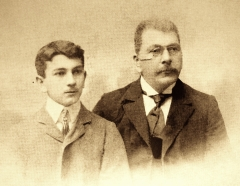
Armen Takhtajan's father (left) and grandfather (right), appr. 1900

Takhtajan was born in Shushi, Russian Empire, present-day Nagorno-Karabakh, Azerbaijan, on 10 June 1910, to a family of Armenian intellectuals. His grandfather Meliksan Takhtadzhyan Petrovich had been born in Trabzon, Ottoman Empire and was educated in Italy, on the island of San Lazzaro degli Armeni, an Armenian enclave, spoke many languages and worked as a journalist. He died in Paris in 1930. His father, Leon Meliksanovich Takhtadzhyan (1884–1950), was born in Batumi, Georgia and was educated as an agronomist at Leipzig University. Graduating in 1906, he worked on farms in France, Switzerland and the United Kingdom, and made a special study of sheep farming. He became proficient in German, French, English, Russian, Georgian and Azerbaijani. Arriving in Shushi in 1908, then a centre of sheep farming in the Caucasus, looking for work, Leon was forced to teach German at the local Realschule attached to the Armenian seminary, due to lack of opportunities in his chosen field. There he met and married Gerseliya Sergeevna Gazarbekyan (1887–1974), Armen Takhtajan's mother, a native of Susha, in 1909.

=== Early life and education ===
The Takhtajans had three children, Armen (1910–2009), Nellie (1914–1994) and Nora (1918–1965). In 1918 the family were forced to flee to northern Armenia because of the pogroms. Throughout his childhood, Armen showed a keen interest in natural history, travelling with his father. Armen attended school in Tbilisi in nearby Georgia, initially at Unified Labor School number 42 (former Mantashevskom commercial school). There he came under the influence of one of his teachers, Alexander Konstantinovich Makaev (Makashvili) (1896–1962), who had previously taught agriculture at Tbilisi State University, and had produced a dictionary of botanical names in Georgian, Russian and Latin. Makaev would take Armen on botanical excursions, teaching him to identify plants from Sosnowski and Grossheim's "Determinants of plant life in the vicinity of Tbilisi" (1920). In 1928 he completed secondary school and travelled to Leningrad. There he volunteered at the biology school at Leningrad University and attended lectures by Vladimir Leontyevich Komarov (1869–1945) on plant morphology. In 1929 he began his studies in biology at Yerevan State University in Yerevan, Armenia, which he completed in 1931. He then returned to Tbilisi, enrolling in the All-Union Institute of Subtropical Crops.

In 1932 after completing his course at Tbilisi he worked for a while as a laboratory assistant at Sukhumi, Georgia, at the subtropical branch of the All-Union Institute of Applied Botany and New Crops (now the Institute of Plant Industry), before returning to Yerevan. In Yerevan he took a position as researcher at the Natural History Museum of Armenia, and then at the Herbarium of the Armenian branch of the Institute of Biology, Soviet Academy of Sciences, and began teaching at Yerevan University in 1936, while completing his Master's thesis.

He died in Saint Petersburg on 13 November 2009, at the age of 99, in 2009, having just completed his most important work, Flowering Plants.

== Work ==
From 1938 to 1948 he headed a Department at the Yerevan State University, and in 1944–1948 he was director of the Botanical Institute of the Academy of Sciences of the Armenian SSR, and Professor of the Leningrad State University. Takhtajan was a member of the Russian Academy of Sciences, as well as a foreign associate of the U.S. National Academy of Sciences since 1971. He was also the academician of the Academy of Sciences of the Armenian SSR, the president of the Soviet All-Union Botanical Society (1973) and the International Association for Plant Taxonomy (1975), member of the Finnish Academy of Science and Literature (1971), the German Academy of Naturalists "Leopoldina" (1972) and other scientific societies. He was a member of the Norwegian Academy of Science and Letters from 1980.

While at the Komarov Botanical Institute in Leningrad in 1940, Takhtajan developed his classification scheme for flowering plants, which emphasized phylogenetic relationships between plants. His system did not become known to botanists in the West until after 1950, and in the late 1950s he began a correspondence and collaboration with the prominent American botanist Arthur Cronquist, whose plant classification scheme was heavily influenced by his collaboration with Takhtajan and other botanists at Komarov.

He is chiefly famous as the author of works on the origins of flowering plants and paleobotany, developing a new classification system of higher plants. He worked on the "Flora of Armenia" (vol. 1–6, 1954–73) and "Fossil flowering plants of the USSR "(v. 1, 1974) books. Takhtajan also developed a system of floristic regions.(Takhtajan, Crovello and Cronquist, 1986)

For many years restrictions were placed on his work because of his opposition to the official line on genetics promoted by Lysenko. In 1993 he worked for a while at the New York Botanical Garden.

=== Takhtajan system ===
The "Takhtajan system" of flowering plant classification treats flowering plants as a division (phylum), Magnoliophyta, with two classes, Magnoliopsida (dicots) and Liliopsida (monocots). These two classes are subdivided into subclasses, and then superorders, orders, and families. The Takhtajan system is similar to the Cronquist system, but with somewhat greater complexity at the higher levels. He favors smaller orders and families, to allow character and evolutionary relationships to be more easily grasped. The Takhtajan classification system remains influential; it is used, for example, by the Montréal Botanical Garden.

== Selected publications ==
- 1948. Морфологическая эволюция покрытосеменных (Morphological evolution of angiosperms). [Translated from Russian to German by Werner Höppner, as Die Evolution der Angiospermae 1959, Fischer, Jena]
- Cronquist, Arthur; Takhtajan, Armen; Zimmermann, Walter (April 1966). "On the Higher Taxa of Embryobionta" (PDF). Taxon. 15 (4): 129–134. doi:10.2307/1217531. JSTOR 1217531.
- 1969. Flowering plants: origin and dispersal. Oliver and Boyd, Edinburgh [Translated from Russian by C Jeffrey]
- 1987. Systema Magnoliophytorum. Leningrad.
- 2009. Flowering Plants. Springer, New York

== Legacy ==
Takhtajan has been considered one of the leading botanists of his time.

He has been honoured in the naming of several plant genera. In 1980, botanist Vandika Ervandovna Avetisyan published Takhtajaniella, which is a genus of flowering plant from Transcausica, belonging to the family Brassicaceae and it was named in his honour. Then in 1990, Nazarova published Takhtajaniantha (from the dandelion tribe within the daisy family,) and lastly in 1997, Takhtajania (from the family Winteraceae, which was found in Madagascar) was published.

== See also ==
- Takhtajan system

== Works by Takhtajan ==
- Takhtajan, A. (June 1964). "The Taxa of the Higher Plants above the Rank of Order". Taxon. 13 (5): 160–164. doi:10.2307/1216134. JSTOR 1216134.
- Cronquist, Arthur; Takhtajan, Armen; Zimmermann, Walter (April 1966). "On the Higher Taxa of Embryobionta". Taxon. 15 (4): 129–134. doi:10.2307/1217531. JSTOR 1217531.
- Takhtajan, Armen. 1973. Chetyre tsarstva organicheskogo mira (Four Kingdoms of the Organic World). Priroda (Nature), Akad. Nauk 2: 22–32.
- Takhtajan, Armen (1980). "Outline of the classification of flowering plants (Magnoliophya)". Botanical Review. 46 (3): 225–359. Bibcode:1980BotRv..46..225T. doi:10.1007/BF02861558. S2CID 30764910.
- Takhtajan, A. (1987). Sistema Magnoliofitov (Systema Magnoliophytorum) (in Russian). Leningrad: Nauka.
- Takhtajan, Armen (1991). Evolutionary trends in flowering plants. New York: Columbia Univ. Press. ISBN 9780231073288.
- Takhtajan, A.L. (2007). Грани эволюции: Статьи по теории эволюции. 1943—2006 (Grani ėvoli︠u︡t︠s︡ii: statʹi po teorii ėvoli︠u︡t︠s︡ii. 1943—2006 [The boundaries of evolution: Articles on the theory of evolution. 1943–2006]. St Petersburg: Nauka. ISBN 978-5-02-026273-7.
- Takhtajan, Armen Leonovich (1997). Diversity and Classification of Flowering Plants. Columbia University Press. ISBN 978-0-231-10098-4.(Available here at Internet Archive)
- Takhtajan, A. L. (1986). Cronquist, Arthur (ed.). Floristic regions of the world. Translated by Crovello, Theodore J. University of California Press. ISBN 0-520-04027-9. OCLC 12135442 – via Internet Archive.
