= Maria Ernestine Walsh-Held =

Botanist and Entomologist (1881–1973)

- Born: 1881; Geneva
- Died: 1973 (aged 91–92); Geneva
- Other names: Maria Ernestine Walsh; Maria Ernestine Held; Mrs Walsh; Mrs H. S. Walsh
- Occupations: Botanist; Entomologist
- Years active: 1915-1958
- Known for: Scientific collecting in Indonesia

Maria Ernestine Walsh-Held (1881–1973) was a Swiss botanist and entomologist who lived and worked for many years in Indonesia.

== Biography ==
Walsh-Held was born Maria Ernestine Held at Geneva in 1881.

Maria married Herbert Shirley Walsh, an Australian produce merchant and later cattle dealer, at Perth in 1905. Maria and Herbert had two daughters, named Elizabeth Muriel (b. 1907) and Cecile Helene (b. 1908). The Walshes moved to Java in 1911 where Herbert worked as an agent for the cattle firm Jenner and Company.

In 1913 Herbert Walsh was on a trip back to Australia where he died on 20 November 1913 as a result of an accident, after being hit by a train on the Bunbury railway bridge at East Perth.

After the death of Herbert, Maria did not remarry. Maria Walsh-Held spent about four decades working in Indonesia before repatriating to Switzerland. Walsh-Held died at Geneva in 1973.

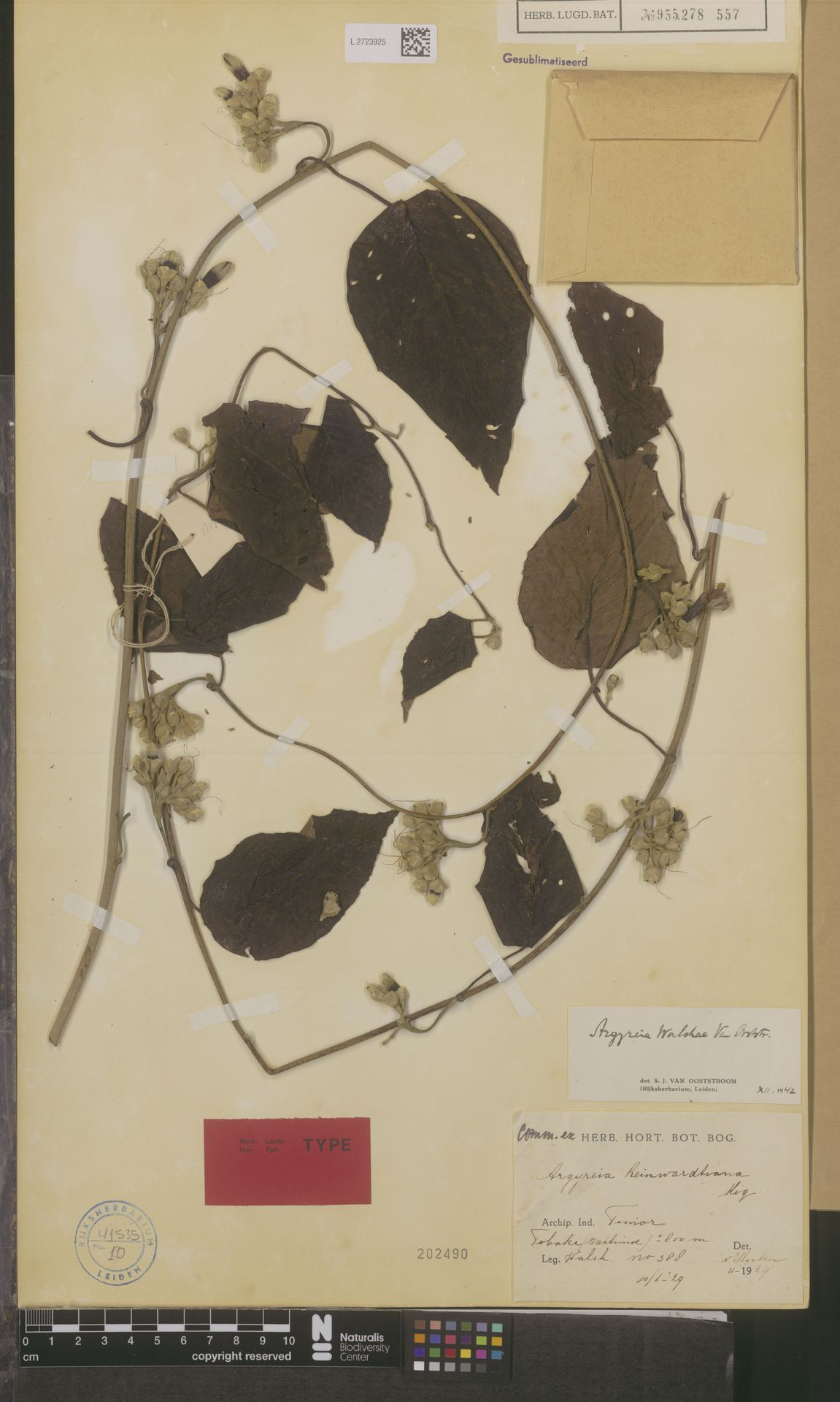
Argyreia walshae Ooststr via Bijmoer R, Scherrenberg M, Creuwels J (2020). Naturalis Biodiversity Center (NL) - Botany. L.2723925. Type specimen collected at Timor by Maria Ernestine Walsh-Held in 1929.

== Scientific collecting ==
From the time of her arrival in Java, Maria Walsh-Held had begun an insect collection. In 1914 Walsh-Held was made a fellow of the Entomological Society of London. By 1915 Walsh-Held had begun scientific collecting in earnest to support herself financially. Walsh-Held is known to have employed local Indonesian people to assist her with collecting.

A collection of moths and other insects Walsh-Held had made around her home and garden at Soekaboemi [Sukabumi], was exhibited on her behalf by Albert Hugh Jones at the Entomological Society of London on 1 December 1915. Around this time Walsh-Held was in correspondence with the Lepidopterist Margaret Fountaine (who had spent a period in Soekaboemi) about Papilio butterflies.

In Timor in the late 1920s Walsh-Held collected the Holotype material of the butterfly Delias lemoulti Talbot, 1931, which she sent to the entomologist and dealer Eugène Le Moult. George Talbot of the British Museum named the new species for Le Moult at Le Moult's insistence, not realising he was not crediting the original collector, and Talbot later expressed his regrets about what had happened:

The butterfly was actually discovered by Mrs. Walsh, a resident of Java, who sent her Timor collections to Le Moult. The author was unaware of this at the time and regrets that the species was not dedicated rightfully to the discoverer. The practice among certain dealers, of keeping secret the names and activities of their collectors is unfortunate, and is liable to recoil upon the business. - George Talbot

In 1937 Walsh-Held collected plants in north east Borneo accompanied by Aët, a botanist who worked at the Herbarium Bogoriense in Buitenzorg [Bogor].

Specimens collected by Walsh-Held are in the collections of Naturalis Biodiversity Center and The Natural History Museum, London.

== Scientific discoveries made from Walsh-Held's work ==
Selected animal and plant species that were first described from specimens collected by Maria Walsh-Held include:

=== Zoology ===
==== Hemiptera ====
Membracidae: Elaphiceps javanensis (male specimen collected by Walsh-Held, with females collected by F.C. Drescher), Leptocentrus pubescens, Evanchon maculatum (two females collected by Walsh-Held, one female by Charles Fuller Baker) and Tricentrus carinatus, all described by William Delbert Funkhouser in 1937

==== Lepidoptera ====
Erebidae: Camptoloma mirabilis (Roepke, 1943) [originally named Leucopardus mirabilis Roepke, 1943] described by Walter Karl Johann Roepke from material that Walsh-Held had collected in western Java at Djampang.

Lycaenidae: Arhopala moolaina subsp. javana Nieuwenhuis, 1969 collected by Walsh-Held in West Java, described by Engbert Jan Nieuwenhuis in 1969.

==== Mammalia ====
Pteropodidae: Chiroptera: Pteropus lombocensis subsp. salottii Kitchener, 1995 described by Darrell Kitchener and Inbu Maryanto from specimens collected by Walsh-Held in West Timor.

=== Botany ===
==== Equisetopsida ====
Asteraceae: Vernonia walshae J. Kost described and named for Walsh-Held by Joséphine Thérèse Koster.

==== Magnoliopsida ====
Convolvulaceae: Argyreia walshae Ooststr. named in Walsh-Held's honour by Simon Jan van Ooststroom.
