= Camptoloma tigrinus =

Scientific classification
- Kingdom: Animalia
- Phylum: Arthropoda
- Class: Insecta
- Order: Lepidoptera
- Superfamily: Noctuoidea
- Family: Nolidae
- Genus: Camptoloma
- Species: C. tigrinus

Binomial name
- Camptoloma tigrinus Hampson, 1894

Synonyms
- Leucopardus tigrinus Hampson, 1894

Species of moth

Camptoloma tigrinus is a moth of the family Nolidae first described by George Hampson in 1894. It is found in India (Assam) and Myanmar.
