= Camptoloma vanata =

Scientific classification
- Kingdom: Animalia
- Phylum: Arthropoda
- Clade: Pancrustacea
- Class: Insecta
- Order: Lepidoptera
- Superfamily: Noctuoidea
- Family: Nolidae
- Genus: Camptoloma
- Species: C. vanata

Binomial name
- Camptoloma vanata Fang, 1994

Species of moth

Camptoloma vanata is a moth of the family Nolidae. It is found in Jiangxi and Hainan in China and in northern Vietnam.
