= Camptoloma mangpua =

Scientific classification
- Kingdom: Animalia
- Phylum: Arthropoda
- Clade: Pancrustacea
- Class: Insecta
- Order: Lepidoptera
- Superfamily: Noctuoidea
- Family: Nolidae
- Genus: Camptoloma
- Species: C. mangpua

Binomial name
- Camptoloma mangpua Zolotuhin & Witt, 2000

Species of moth

Camptoloma mangpua is a moth of the family Nolidae. It is endemic to Sikkim.
