= Takhtajaniella =

Scientific classification
- Kingdom: Plantae
- Clade: Tracheophytes
- Clade: Angiosperms
- Clade: Eudicots
- Clade: Rosids
- Order: Brassicales
- Family: Brassicaceae
- Genus: Takhtajaniella; V.E.Avet.
- Species: T. globosa

Binomial name
- Takhtajaniella globosa V.E.Avet.

Synonyms
- Alyssum globosum Grossh.

Species of flowering plant

Takhtajaniella is a genus of flowering plants belonging to the family Brassicaceae. It only contains one known species, Takhtajaniella globosa.

It is native to somewhere in the Transcaucasus region, which corresponds to the territories of Armenia, Georgia and Azerbaijan, according to the definition used in the source.

The genus name of Takhtajaniella is in honour of Armen Takhtajan (1910–2009), a Soviet-Armenian botanist, who was one of the most important figures in 20th century plant evolution and systematics and biogeography. The Latin specific epithet of globosa means globe or globe-like from globulus. Both the genus and the species were first described and published in S.G.Zhilin, Sist. Zvol. Vyssh. Rast. on page 54 in 1980.
