= Joséphine Thérèse Koster =

Dutch botanist (1902–1986)

Joséphine Thérèse Koster (23 June 1902 – 22 June 1986) was a botanist.

She named many plants in the genera Piora, Vernonia, and others.

The standard author abbreviation J.Kost. is used to indicate this person as the author when citing a botanical name.

Koster began her botanical career in 1930 as an unpaid assistant at Rijksherbarium, Leiden, the national Herbarium of The Netherlands. She held this position until 1933 when she was promoted to curator of the Weber-Van Bosse algae collection, which was recently acquired by the herbarium. This was her first paid position. While working at this position, she worked on her thesis. In June 1935, she defended her thesis titled The Compositae of the Malayan Archipelago I. Vernonieae and Eupatorieae. Dr. Koster retired in 1967 and was honored by a special issue of Blumea. Throughout her career, she published 88 texts on Cyanophyceae to the Index nominum genericorum, a compilation of generic names published for all organisms covered by the International Code of Botanical Nomenclature.
