= Wilhelm Gerhard Walpers =

German botanist (1816–1853)

- Born: 26 December 1816; Mühlhausen, Germany
- Died: 18 June 1853 (aged 36); Berlin, Kingdom of Prussia
- Education: University of Greifswald; University of Breslau
- Known for: Repertorium botanices systematicæ
- Scientific career
- Fields: Botany

Wilhelm Gerhard Walpers (26 December 1816 – 18 June 1853) was a German botanist. This botanist is denoted by the author abbreviation Walp. when citing a botanical name.

Walpers was born on 26 December 1816, in Mühlhausen. He received his education at the Universities of Greifswald and Breslau, earning his habilitation in 1848, at Berlin. He died on 18 June 1853, aged 36, in Berlin, from a self-inflicted gunshot wound.

The plant genus Walpersia (synonym Phyllota) is named after him.

== Selected publications ==
- Repertorium botanices systematicæ (six volumes, 1842–1847).
- Walpers, Wilhelm Gerhard (1848–1868). Annales botanices systematicae (7 vols.) (in Latin). Leipzig.
