= Thompson and Morgan =

British garden supplies company

Thompson & Morgan
- Type: Privately held
- Founded: 1855 Ipswich, England
- Headquarters: Ipswich, England
- Products: Seeds, young plants (UK), and garden sundries
- Parent: Branded Garden Products Limited
- Website: www.thompson-morgan.com

Thompson & Morgan was an independent company based in Ipswich, Suffolk but is now owned by BVG. Founded in 1855, Thompson & Morgan offer English plants, seeds and sundries worldwide through their websites. The U.S. division of the company was sold to Gardens Alive in 2009.

== Overview ==
The company distributes their products through its mail order catalogues, the Internet and retail outlets. Their various websites feature over 8,000 products, showcasing the entire Thompson and Morgan range.

Seed catalogues are distributed to 163 countries worldwide. Thompson and Morgan seeds are stocked in the following countries: Great Britain, Ireland, France, Germany, Holland, Belgium, Italy, Austria, Switzerland, Greece, Turkey, Norway, Denmark, Finland, Sweden, USA, Canada, Korea, and Japan.

== History ==
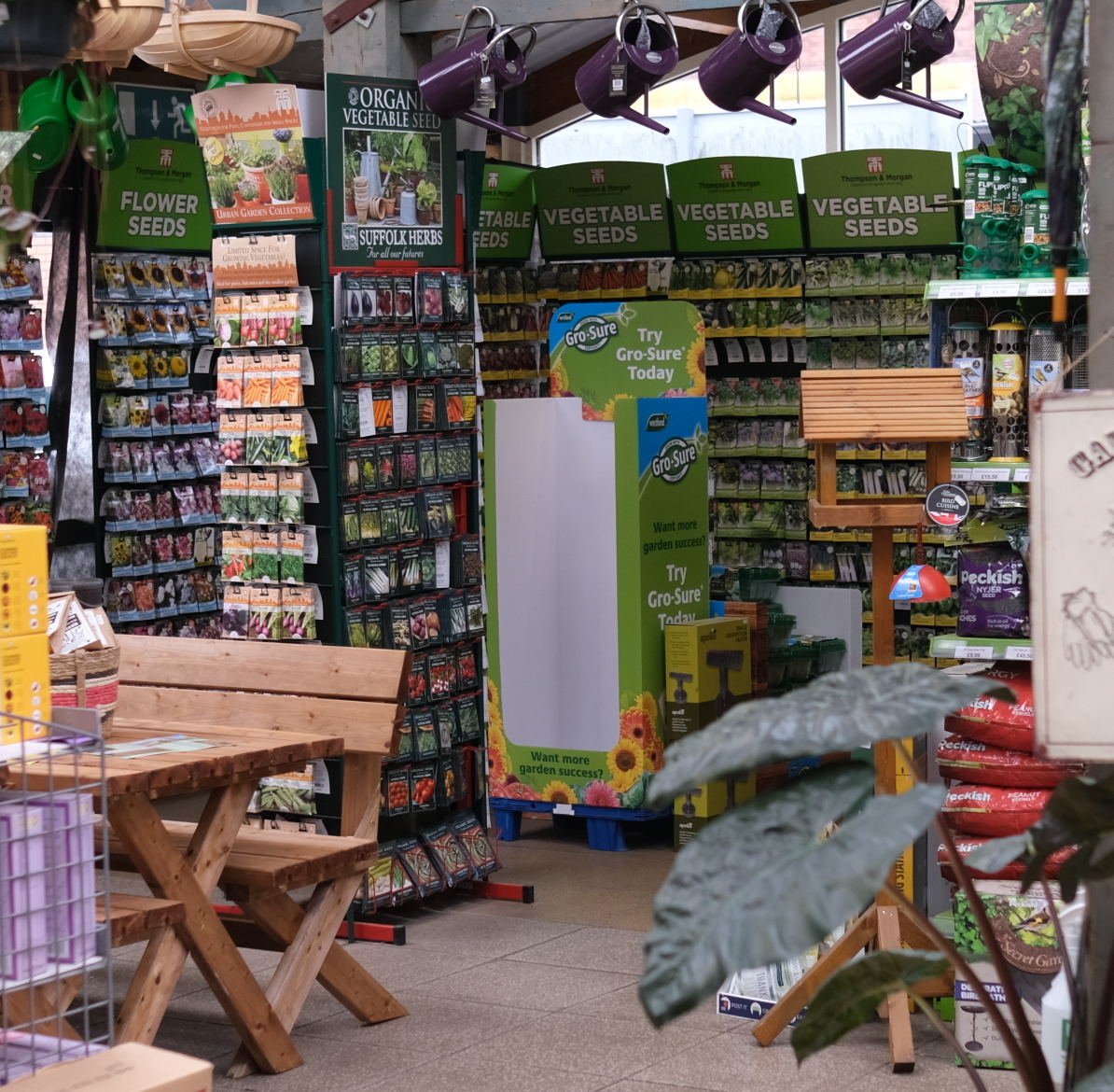
Thompson and Morgan seed racks in a Bristol garden centre

Thompson & Morgan (T&M) had its origins in a small garden behind a baker's shop in Ipswich, where a young William Thompson's passion for botany grew. His speciality was growing rare and unusual plants whose seeds were sent from countries all over the world. Not only did it provide a sense of adventure for Thompson, it also established friendships with such scientists as Charles Darwin, Sir Joseph Dalton Hooker and Sir Michael Foster.

From the back garden he moved to a nursery at the edge of Ipswich and then to an even larger one. Eventually, there were three of Thompson’s nurseries in the town. At this time, Thompson began to publish a magazine called The English Flower Garden.

In 1855, after moving from that small 'starter' garden, Thompson issued his first catalogue. He specialised in growing rare and unusual plants, seeds of which were sent to him from many overseas countries. His efforts made him one of the most distinguished plantsmen of his day and he was honoured by the Royal Horticultural Society with the Victoria Medal of Honour in 1897.

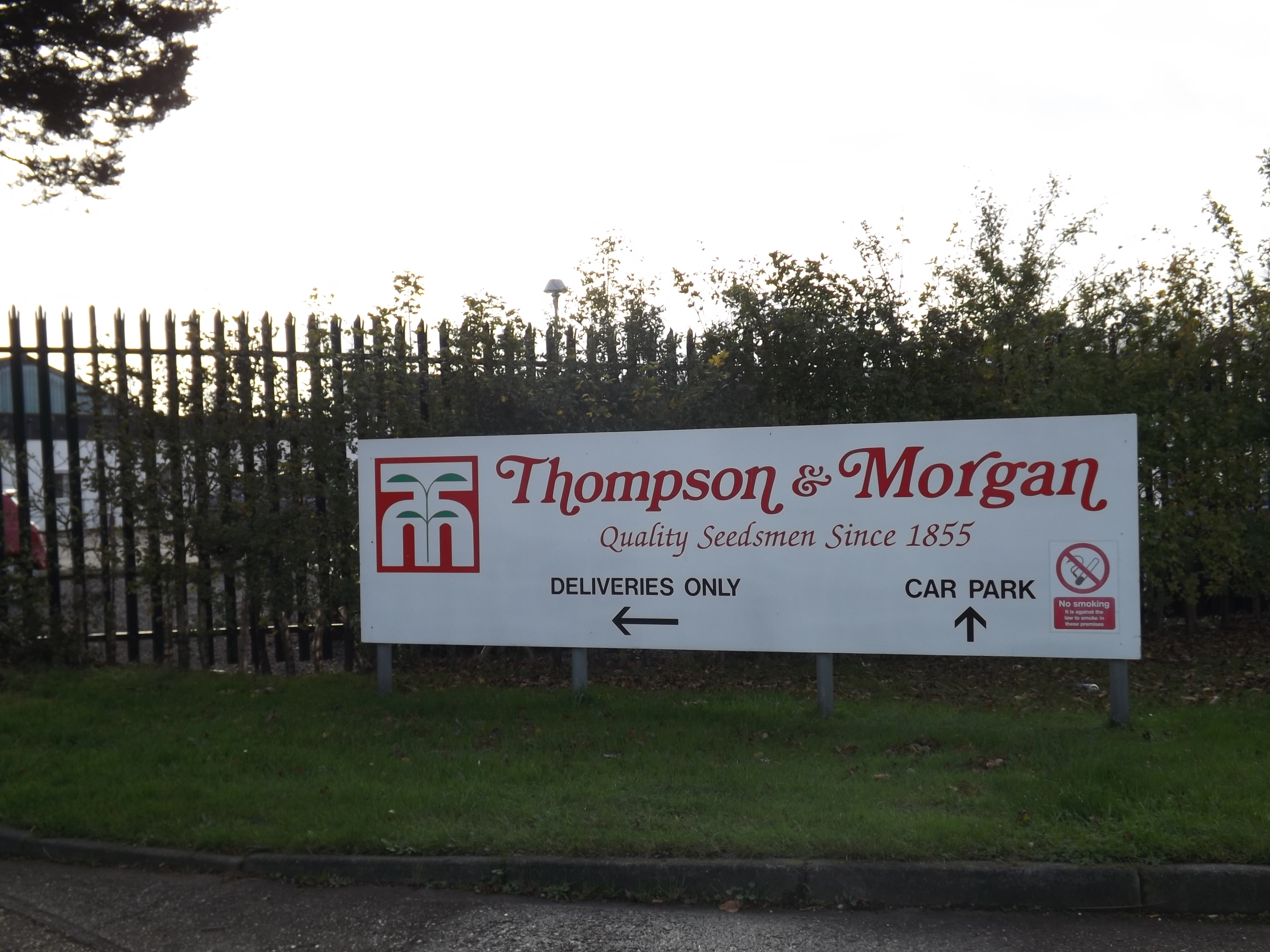
Facility outside Ipswich, UK

With the seed-raising firm expanding, William Thompson started his partnership with John Morgan. John provided the business acumen that enabled Thompson & Morgan's continued solid growth. Thompson died in July 1903 at the age of 80, having lived to see Thompson & Morgan become one of the country's greatest seed firms with a reputation for introducing more species and varieties to the British gardening public than any other company.

John Morgan spent the next 10 years as sole owner until he partnered with Joseph Sangster in 1913. Sangster was a brilliant horticulturalist who was to add 4,000 plant names to the 2,000 already offered in the T&M catalogue. He took full control of the company upon John's death in 1921.

Joseph's son Murray joined the company in 1933 and the following year Joseph was elected president of the Horticultural Trades Association of Great Britain and Ireland. In 1939, T&M became a limited company and when Joseph died in 1952, Murray Sangster took control. His two sons, Keith and Bruce, joined Murray later. In 1973, they decided to expand their distribution centre in Poplar Lane, Ipswich from where the company still operates. In 1982, Bruce Sangster headed the company's expansion in the U.S. after previously having a distribution base in Jackson, New Jersey. In 1995 this was followed up by the creation of a young plants division in Guernsey in the Channel Islands. The Sangster brothers subsequently relinquished control of the business in December 1999 for £17.5 million.

In May 2002, Thompson & Morgan returned to independent private ownership by Primary Capital Partners, the Sangster brothers and key management. The company was sold to BVG Group in March 2017 through the acquisition of their parent company, Branded Garden Products for an undisclosed amount, however the sale price was estimated at £10 million. The new group has a combined turnover of £140 million, with an EBITDA in the region of £13.5 million.

== Awards ==
In the RHS Chelsea Flower Show 2018's 'plant of the year' competition, Thompson & Morgan plants were awarded first and third place.

- First place: Hydrangea 'Runaway Bride Snow White'
- Third place: Helianthus 'Sunbelievable Brown Eyed Girl'

== Catalogue ==
The first Thompson and Morgan catalogue was created in 1855. They now produce over 20 different catalogues that are distributed in the UK, US, French and German markets. Catalogues are distributed by mail and can be requested directly from the company by telephone or via their websites.
