= Bernard Renault (botanist) =

French paleobotanist

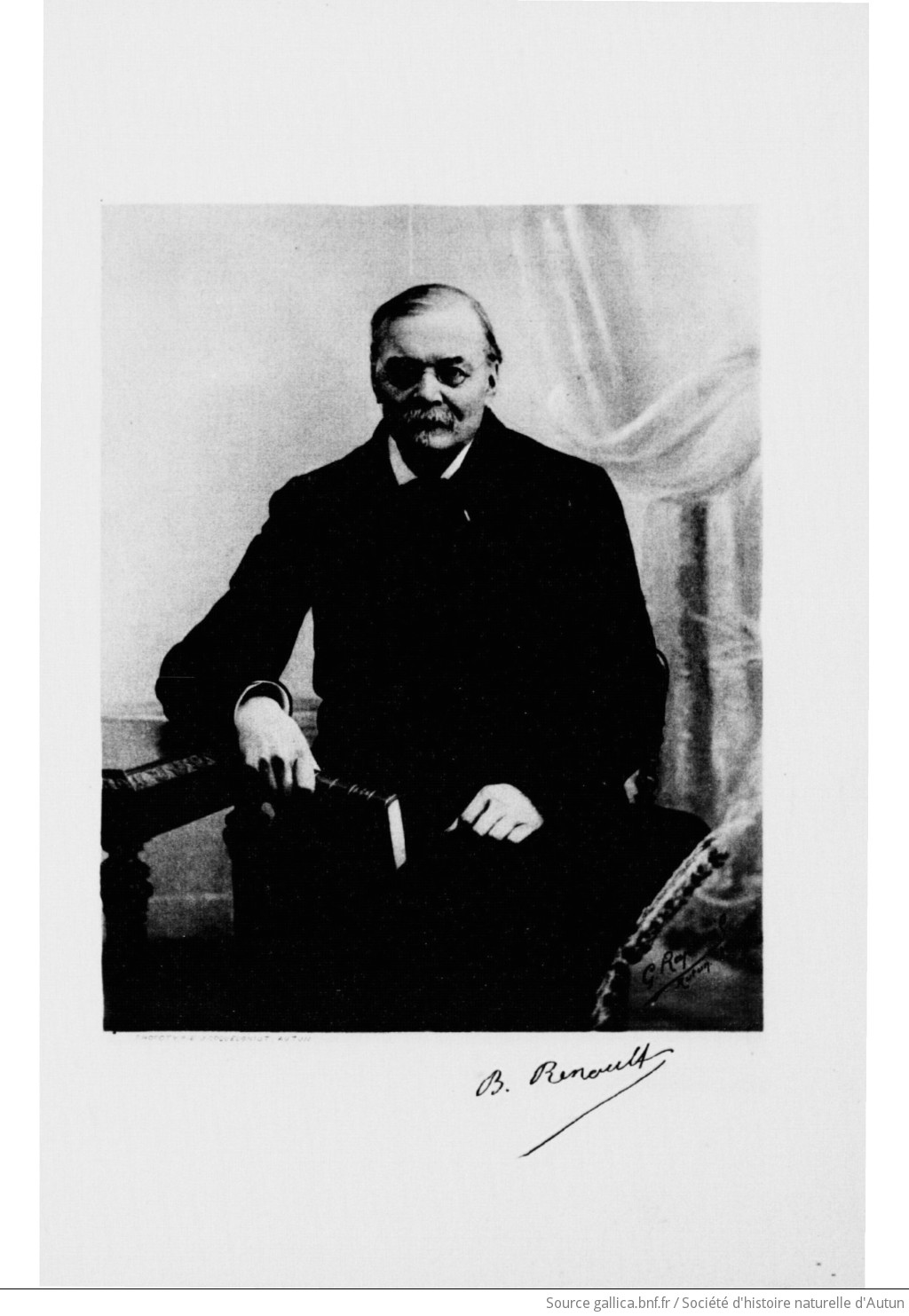
Bernard Renault (1905)

Bernard Renault (4 March 1836, Autun – 16 October 1904) was a French paleobotanist. He was a specialist in regard to the anatomy of Carboniferous and Permian plants.

In 1867 he earned his doctorate in physical sciences at Paris, followed by work as an instructor of chemistry at the college in Cluny (1867–72). Later on, he was associated with the Muséum national d'Histoire naturelle in Paris, serving as a préparateur (1872–76) and an assistant naturalist (1876–1904). In 1879 he obtained his doctorate in natural sciences.

During his tenure at Cluny, he developed an interest in paleobotany. He conducted studies of fossil flora in the vicinity of his hometown of Autun, an area abundant in silicified remains of plants dating from Permo-Carboniferous times. His studies of fossil ferns led to the founding of a new plant family, Botryopterideae. He also made important findings concerning the anatomy of the extinct genus Sphenophyllum, as well as to the anatomy and reproductive aspects of the extinct genus Annularia. His work caught the attention of Adolphe Brongniart, who subsequently offered him a position at the natural history museum in Paris. With Brongniart, he conducted investigations of silicified seeds.

He is credited as the first scientist to account for all organs of the extinct gymnosperm family Cordaitaceae. The genus Renaultia was named in his honour by Charles René Zeiller (1883).

He was a member of the Société éduenne des lettres, sciences et arts (from 1867), the Société linnéenne de Normandie, the Institut géologique de Vienne, and in 1884, was deputy associate of the Carte géographique de France project. In 1886, he was a founding member and first president of the Société d'histoire naturelle et des amis du muséum d'Autun.

== Selected works ==
- Recherches sur les végétaux silicifiés d'Autun, 1876 – Research on the silicified flora of Autun.
- Végétaux silicifiés d'Autun et de Saint-Etienne. Nouvelles recherches sur la structure des "Sphenophyllum" et sur leurs affinités botaniques – Silicified flora of Autun and Saint-Etienne. New research on the structure of Sphenophyllum and on their botanical affinities.
- Structure comparée de quelques tiges de la flore carboniféres, 1879 – Comparative structure of some stems of Carboniferous flora.
- Cours de botanique fossile fait au Muséum national d'Histoire naturelle, (1881–1886, 4 volumes) – Course on fossil botany at the Muséum national d'Histoire naturelle.
- Flore fossile, (1888–89, 2 volumes) with Charles René Zeiller – Fossil flora.
- Sur quelques microorganismes des combustibles fossiles, 1900 – On some micro-organisms found in fossil fuels.
