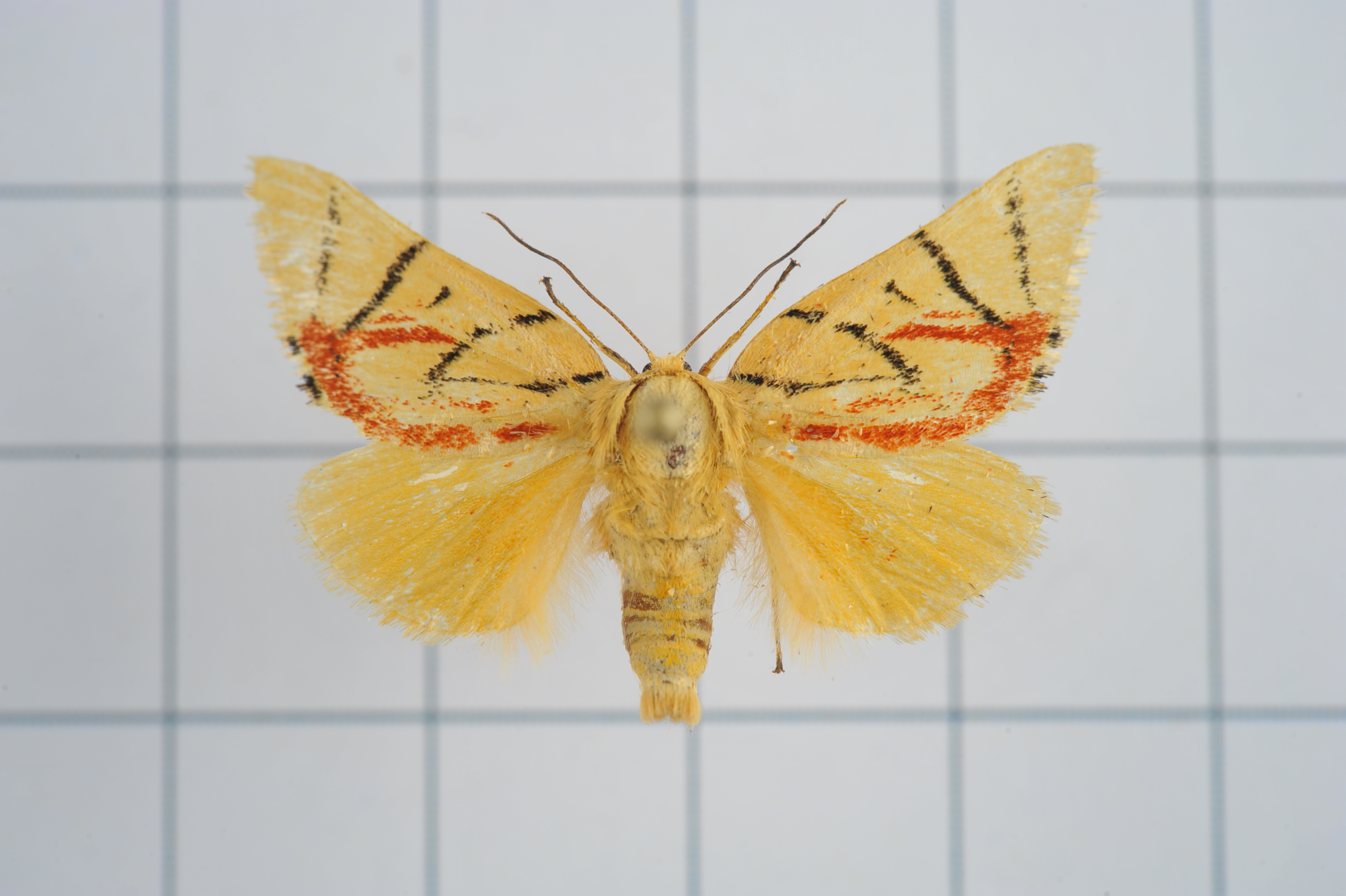

Scientific classification
- Kingdom: Animalia
- Phylum: Arthropoda
- Class: Insecta
- Order: Lepidoptera
- Superfamily: Noctuoidea
- Family: Nolidae
- Subfamily: Chloephorinae
- Tribe: Camptolomini
- Genus: Camptoloma; Felder, 1874

Synonyms
- Leucopardus Hampson, 1894

= Camptoloma (moth) =

Genus of insects

Camptoloma is a genus of moths in the family Nolidae. It was formerly incorrectly placed in Arctiidae.

== Species ==
- Camptoloma bella M. Wang & G.H. Huang, 2005
- Camptoloma binotatum Butler, 1881
- Camptoloma carum Kishida, 1984
- Camptoloma interiorata (Walker [1865])
- Camptoloma kishidai M. Wang & G.H. Huang, 2005
- Camptoloma mangpua Zolotuhin & Witt, 2000
- Camptoloma mirabilis (Roepke, 1943)
- Camptoloma quimeiae Buchsbaum & M.Y. Chen, 2010
- Camptoloma tigrinus (Hampson, 1894)
- Camptoloma vanata Fang, 1994
