= Camptoloma bella =

Scientific classification
- Domain: Eukaryota
- Kingdom: Animalia
- Phylum: Arthropoda
- Class: Insecta
- Order: Lepidoptera
- Superfamily: Noctuoidea
- Family: Nolidae
- Genus: Camptoloma
- Species: C. bella

Binomial name
- Camptoloma bella M. Wang & G.H. Huang, 2005

Species of moth

Camptoloma bella is a moth of the family Nolidae. It is endemic to Guangxi in China.

The wingspan is about 45 mm.
