= Camptoloma interiorata =

Scientific classification
- Kingdom: Animalia
- Phylum: Arthropoda
- Class: Insecta
- Order: Lepidoptera
- Superfamily: Noctuoidea
- Family: Nolidae
- Genus: Camptoloma
- Species: C. interiorata

Binomial name
- Camptoloma interiorata (Walker, [1865])

Synonyms
- Numenes interiorata Walker, [1865]; Camptoloma interioratum; Camptoloma interiorata binotatum Butler, 1881; Camptoloma interiorata binotatum f. designata Mell, 1943; Camptoloma carum Kishida; Camptoloma erythropygum Felder & Rogenhofer, 1868; Camptoloma flagrans Swinhoe, 1893; Camptoloma interiorata binotatum f. pallida Mell, 1943; Camptoloma interiorata binotatum f. rubrescens Mell, 1943

Species of moth

Camptoloma interiorata is a moth of the family Nolidae. It is found in China, Japan, the Korean Peninsula, and the Russian Far East.

The wingspan is 30–33mm.

It is considered a pest on Quercus species and Sapium sebiferum.
