= Camptoloma binotatum =

Scientific classification
- Domain: Eukaryota
- Kingdom: Animalia
- Phylum: Arthropoda
- Class: Insecta
- Order: Lepidoptera
- Superfamily: Noctuoidea
- Family: Nolidae
- Genus: Camptoloma
- Species: C. binotatum

Binomial name
- Camptoloma binotatum Butler, 1881

Species of moth

Camptoloma binotatum is a moth of the family Nolidae. It is found in northern India and Assam, Nepal, Myanmar and southern China.
