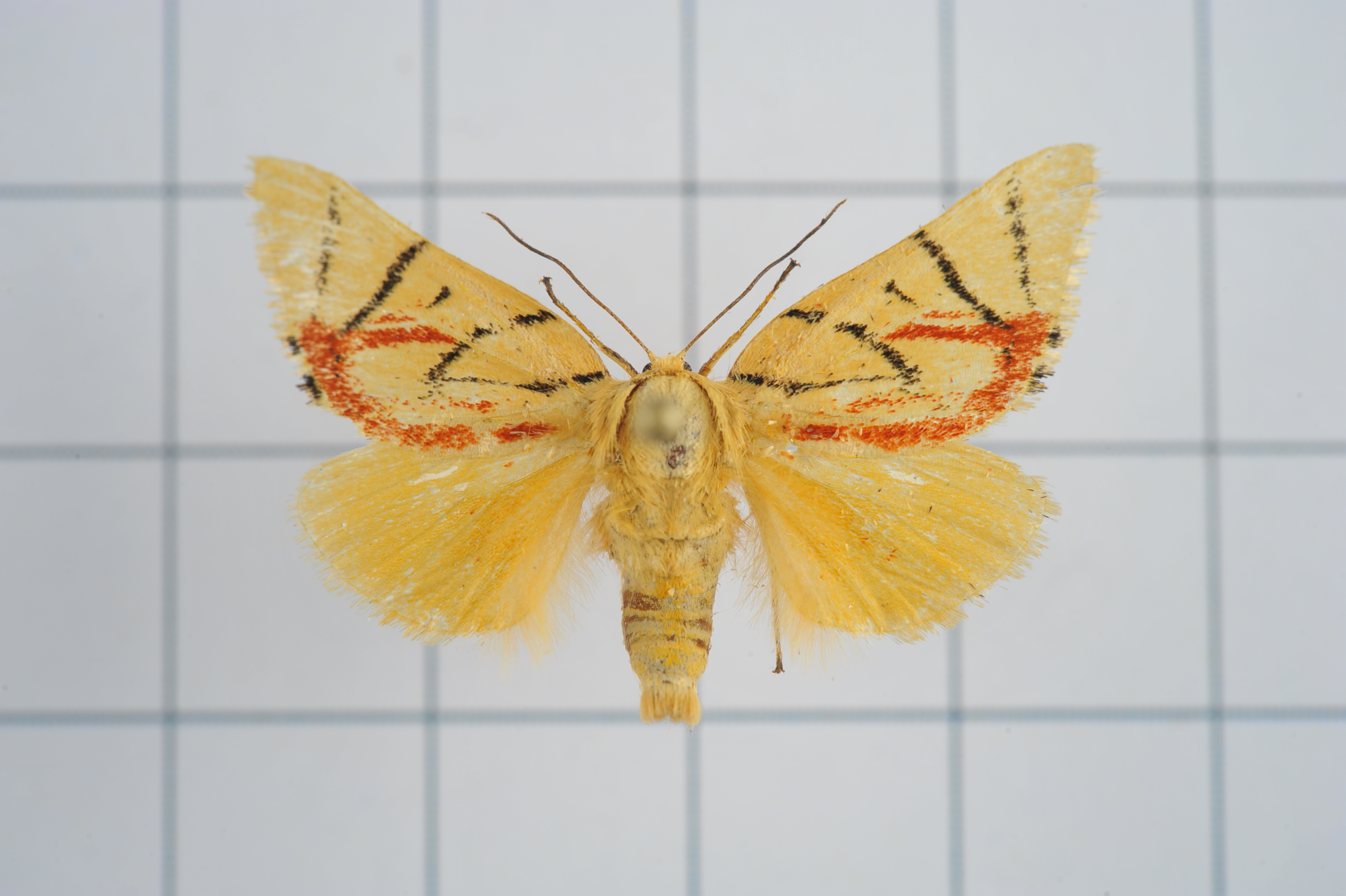

Scientific classification
- Kingdom: Animalia
- Phylum: Arthropoda
- Clade: Pancrustacea
- Class: Insecta
- Order: Lepidoptera
- Superfamily: Noctuoidea
- Family: Nolidae
- Genus: Camptoloma
- Species: C. carum

Binomial name
- Camptoloma carum Kishida, 1984

Synonyms
- Camptoloma quimeiae Buchsbaum & Chen, 2010

= Camptoloma carum =

Species of moth

Camptoloma carum is a moth of the family Nolidae. It is endemic to Taiwan and occurs in low to mid-altitude mountains (100–2,150 m (330–7,050 ft) above sea level).

The wingspan is 31–40 mm (1.2–1.6 in). Adults are on wing from May at lower altitudes to June–July at higher altitudes. It is likely that the larvae feed on Quercus glauca.
