= Lorenzo Gordin Yates =

American paleontologist

- Born: January 12, 1837; Isle of Sheppey
- Died: January 1909 (aged 71–72); Santa Barbara, California
- Scientific career
- Fields: Botany
- Institutions: Anthropological Society of Washington; California Academy of Sciences; California Dental Association; New Zealand Institute; Historical Society of Southern California; Santa Barbara Society of Natural History

Lorenzo Gordin Yates (January 12, 1837 – January 1909) was an American paleontologist.

== Biography ==
=== Early life ===
Lorenzo Yates was born on January 12, 1837, on the Isle of Sheppey. He attended various private schools and by the age of 14 moved to New York City. His studies were varied ranging from dentistry and medicine to chemistry and mineralogy and even fossil collections. He used to study birds, but realized that his passion for dentistry is greater, he started practicing it in Wisconsin in 1861. In the same state he married Eunice Amelia Lake and moved to Centerville, California with her in 1864. There, he continued dentistry and a search for fossils at the Mission Peak.

=== Discoveries ===
In Irvington he participated in a search for elephant and horse remains with Charles Allen and Emery Munyan which were discovered by them between 1867 and 1876. Prior to it, he also discovered a tusk and a jaw of a mastodon in 1871 in Mission San Jose, which was measured to be 24 inches and was the most complete jaw ever discovered in the state of California. He sent the jaw to Yale College for examination and collected more elephant fossils which he found 40 feet (12 m) below the surface in 1872 which were examined at the Wabash College. He also discovered some amphibious animals that he called The Marine Monsters of Alameda County since he found them there. Between June 12, 1875, to August 11, 1877, he wrote articles titles "Rambles of a Naturalist." The articles covered the "Indians of Clear Lake," the "Mound-Builders" of the Washington Township and Murray Township, now Southern Alameda County and South East Alameda County, and fossils found in the region.

=== Death and memory ===
He moved to Santa Barbara, California in 1881 where he worked at Santa Barbara Society of Natural History till his death in January 1909. During his life he worked in many organizations such as Anthropological Society of Washington, California Academy of Sciences, California Dental Association, the New Zealand Institute, the Historical Society of Southern California and various Victorian Institutes and even was a fellow at the Geological Society of America. Later on, some of his fossils were moved from those places to the Golden Gate Park Museum and many of them were donated to the Lincoln School District. A list of his papers that were written between 1886 and 1905 are in Islapedia
