= Natural History Museum of Armenia =

The Natural History Museum of Armenia
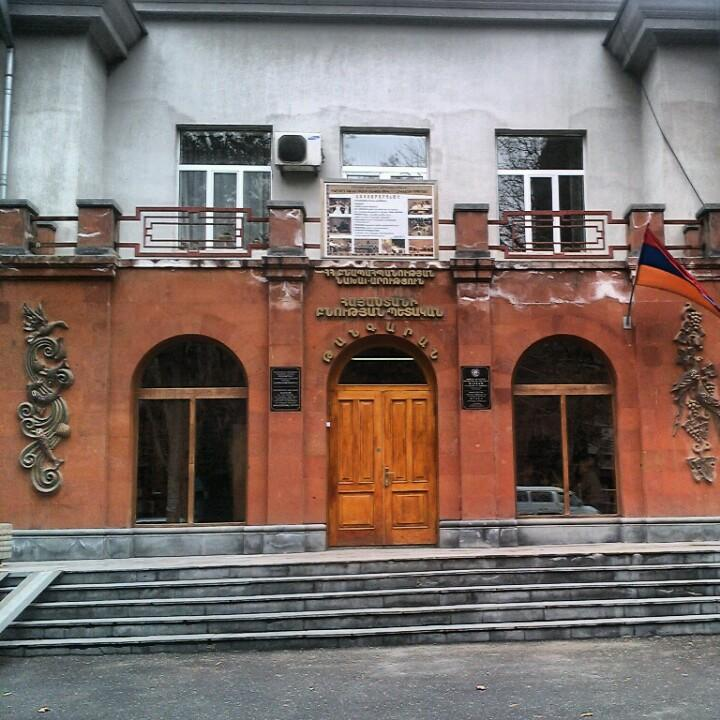
- Location: 34, Tigran Mets Ave, Yerevan, Armenia
- Type: museum
- Website: http://smn.am/

The Natural History Museum of Armenia (Armenian: Հայաստանի բնության պետական թանգարան, romanized: Hayastani bnut'yan petakan t'angaran) represents Armenia's unique nature and its diversity. The museum was reopened in 2004.

== History ==
During the Soviet period, an anti-religion museum was opened in 1952 which was later transformed into a museum of natural sciences and in 1960 renamed as The Natural History Museum of Armenia. In 1999 the museum was relocated in another building. From 2000 to 2004 with the patronage of Bella and Levon Aharonyan, two Iranian-Armenian benefactors, the building of the museum was reconstructed and opened to the public with its new exhibition.

== Exhibition ==
The museum is home to over 6000 objects, only one-third of which are temporarily or primarily put on display. In four rooms, rare types of flora and fauna are exhibited. The museum also presents the personal collection of the Aharonyan family.

The objects in the museum represent the diversity of nature in Armenia. The main exhibition contains photos related to zoology, botany, geology and plastic arts. replicas of mammals, reptiles, birds, amphibious animals, fish, insects, and arachnid as well as skulls, skins, shells, pieces of trees, samples of herbarium, animal or plant fossils, useful extracted materials, oil paintings, drawings etc.

== Events ==
The museum holds exhibitions and occasional events aiming to increase environmental awareness and active participation in offering solutions for environmental problems. Many of the animals in the museum are registered in the IUCN Red List of Threatened Species.

== The Natural History Museum of Armenia ==
Since February 27, 2003, The Natural History Museum of Armenia operates according to the constitution of Armenia. The goal of the museum, as a non-commercial organization, is to raise awareness and knowledge regarding environmental issues and positively influence the accomplishment of environmental programs.

The organization fulfills various types of enterprises such as the following:

- Designing micro museums and spaces for plants and animals indoors
- Organizing parallel exhibitions to those of the museum such as exhibitions of decorative fish or birds.
- Increasing the number of the endangered species in Armenia, so as to return them to the nature
- Growing decorative plants and nurturing herbal plants for exhibition purposes.

== Branches ==
The museum has active branches in Shirak (Gyumri) and Ararat (Qukasav) regions.

== Address ==
- Number 34, Tigran Mets Avenue, Yerevan, Armenia

== Gallery ==
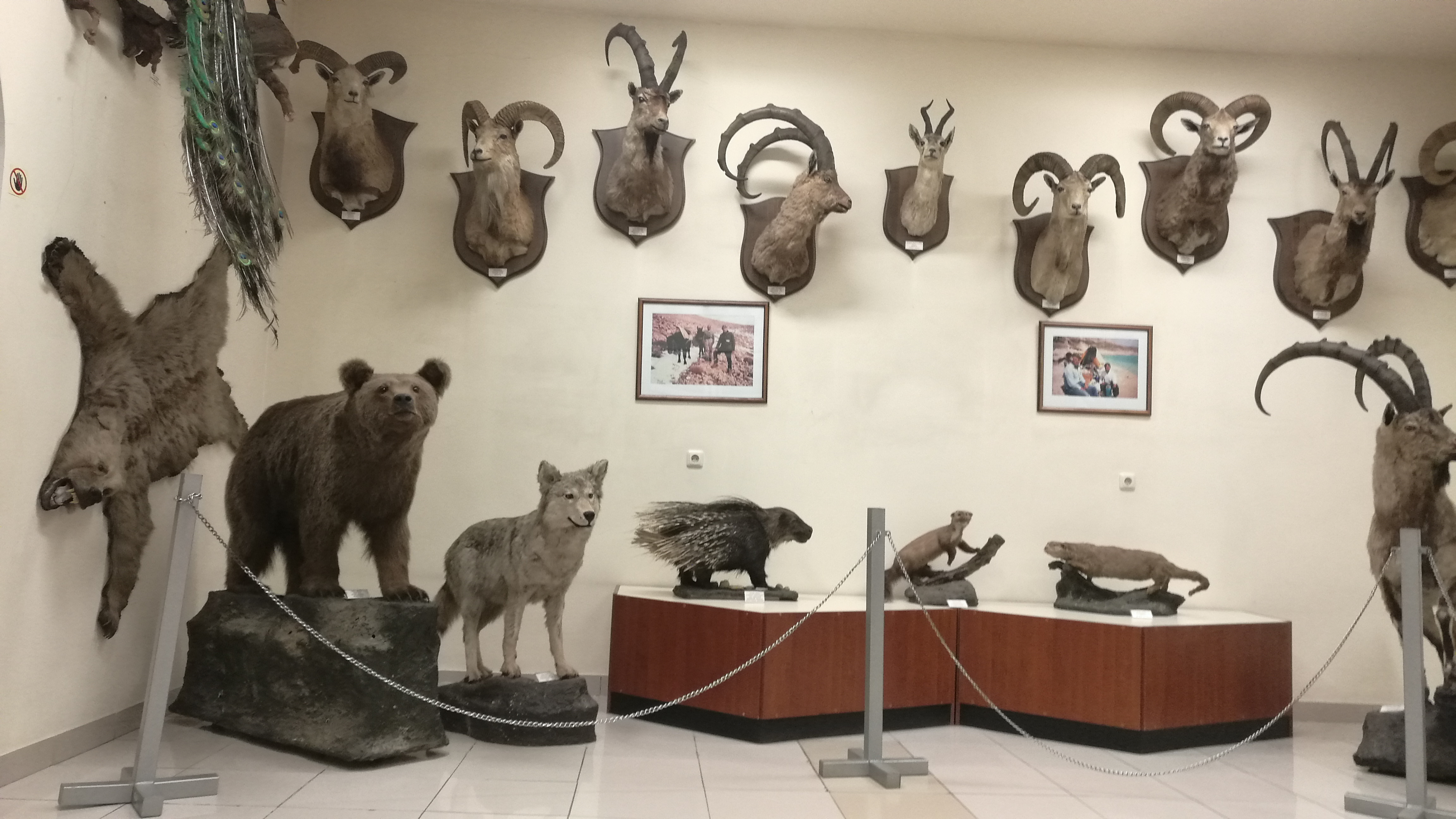

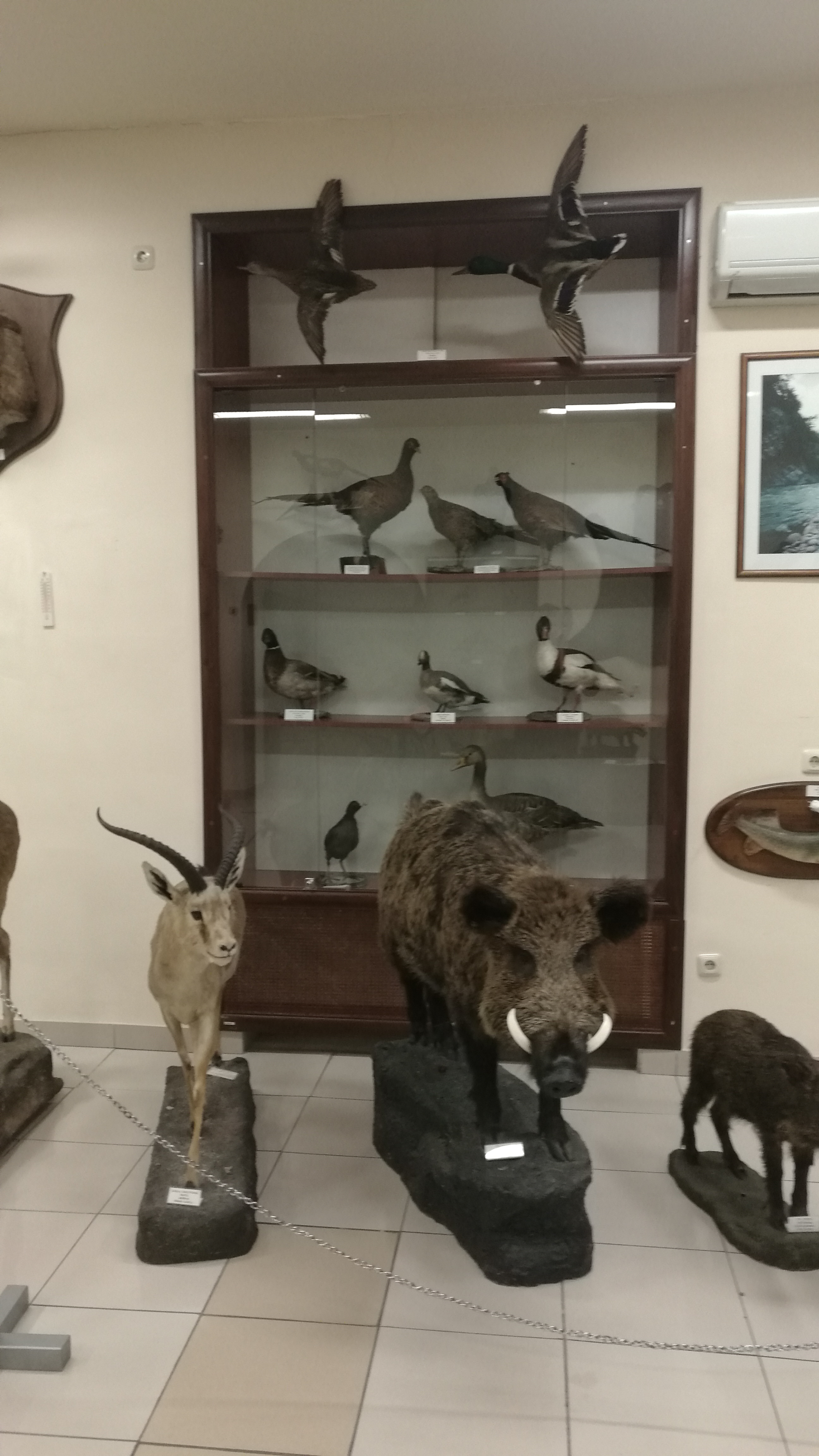

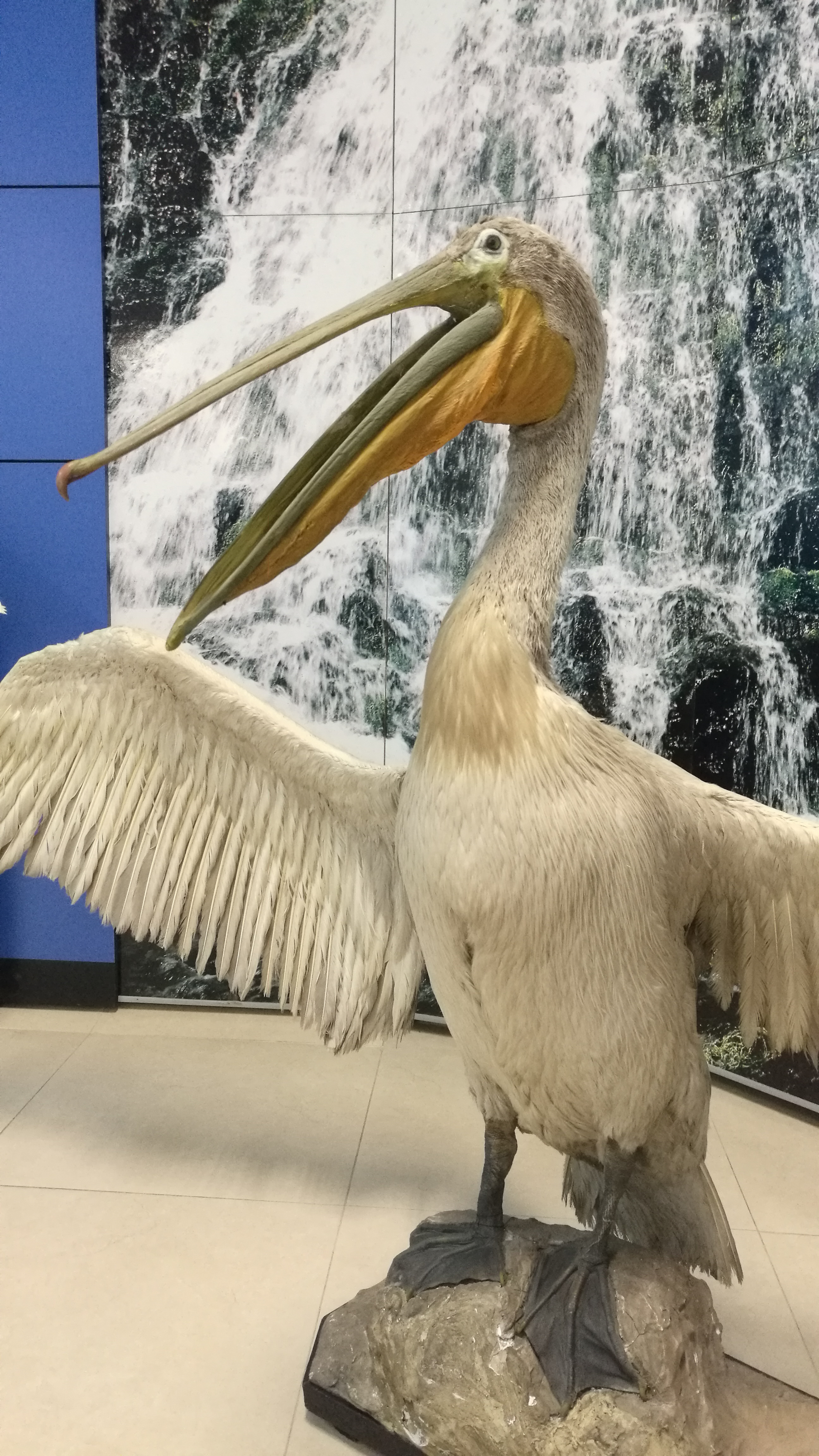
