= Piora =

Scientific classification
- Kingdom: Plantae
- Clade: Tracheophytes
- Clade: Angiosperms
- Clade: Eudicots
- Clade: Asterids
- Order: Asterales
- Family: Asteraceae
- Subfamily: Asteroideae
- Tribe: Astereae
- Subtribe: Lagenophorinae
- Genus: Piora; J.T.Koster
- Species: P. ericoides

Binomial name
- Piora ericoides J.T.Koster

Genus of flowering plants

Piora is a genus of Papuasian plants in the tribe Astereae within the family Asteraceae. The only known species is Piora ericoides, which is native to the island of New Guinea.
