= William Thompson (horticulturist) =

English chemist and horticulturalist

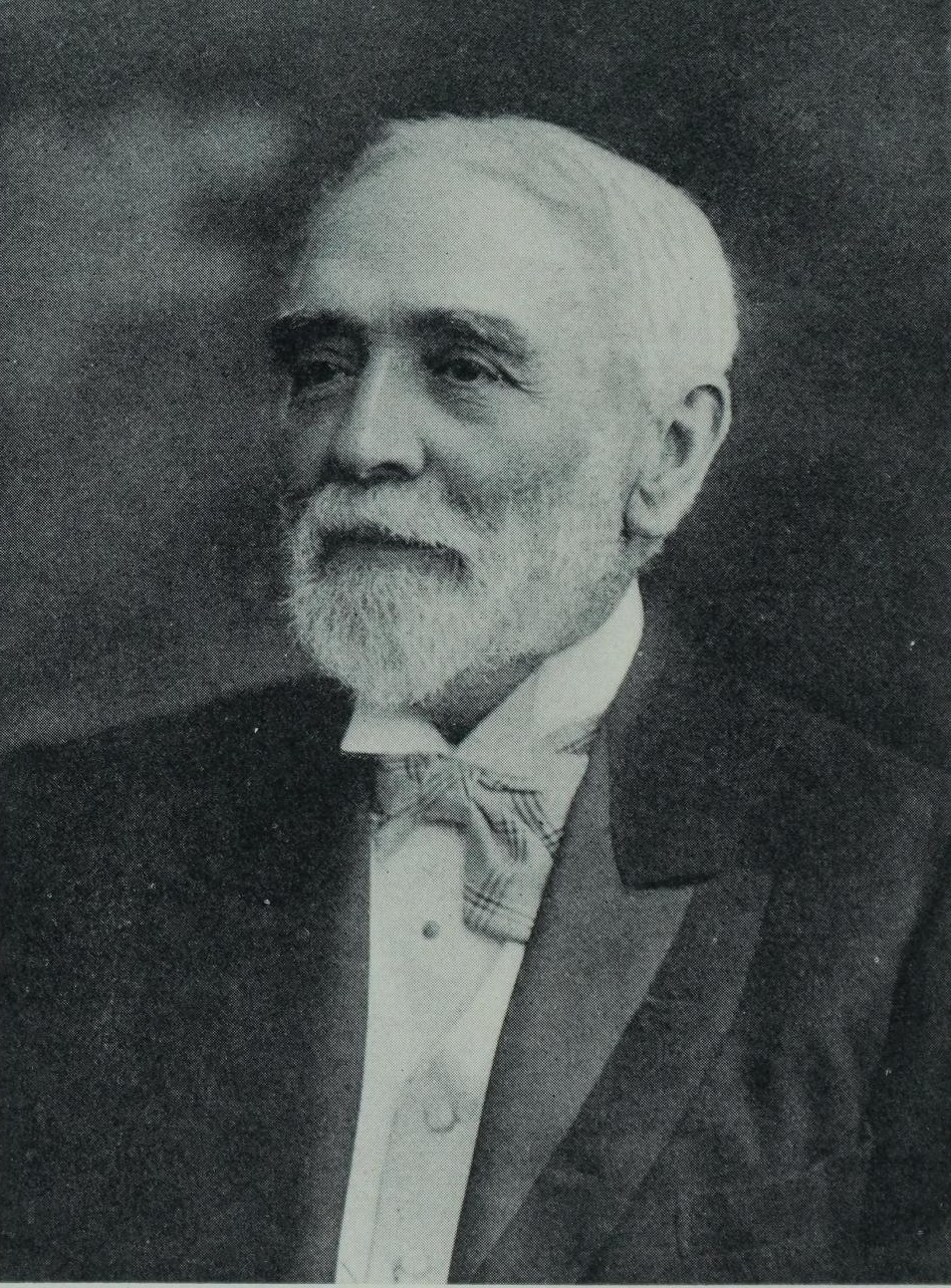

William Thompson (18 May 1823 - 3 July 1903) was an English chemist and horticulturist. He introduced a number of herbaceous flowering ornamentals from the United States and Australia into England. After starting a successful nursery business, he joined John Morgan to start Thompson and Morgan seed business in 1855.

Thompson was born in Ipswich. He became interested in photography and chemistry at an early age. He travelled and took pictures around the country using the daguerrotype technique. Ill-health forced him at home and he became interested in gardening and he soon began to grow many rare species in Ipswich. He produced a seed catalogue in 1855. He soon specialized in producing the seeds of alpine plants, many introduced from elsewhere such as the Rhodanthe manglesii from Australia in 1861, Aquilegia caerulea, Godetia Whitneyi, Leptosiphon roseus and Phacelia campanularia. Oenothera lamarckiana was also likely introduced into England by him. He founded the magazine English Flower Garden in 1852 and published a Gardening Book of Annuals (1855). He received the Victoria Medal of Honour from the Royal Horticultural Society in 1897. He married Elizabeth Lucy née Fisher (1827–1884) in 1860 and she set up a confectioner and bakery business. They had a son and three daughters who included the artist Lucy Mary Thompson (1864-1937).
