= Paul Octave Wiehe =

Mauritian botanist and mycologist

Paul Octave Wiehe CBE (1910-1975) was a Mauritian botanist.

Wiehe was born on 21 October 1910, in Labourdonnais, Rivière du Rempart. He obtained a scholarship in 1930 to study at the Mauritius College of Agriculture. He went on to Imperial College in London where he obtained a degree Botany and became an Associate of the Royal College of Science.

He returned to Mauritius as a teacher at the Royal College, Mauritius (1933-1935). He was then employed by the Colonial Agricultural Services as a Plant Pathologist in the Department of Agriculture, Mauritius, and transferred to Nyasaland in 1948, where he stayed until 1953. He became the first director of the Mauritius Sugar Industry Research Institute (MSIRI). From 1968 to 1973 he was Vice-Chancellor of the University of Mauritius, where the Paul Octave Wiehe Auditorium was named in his honour in 1975.

He was awarded an M.Sc. in 1945, the D.Sc. of London University in 1957 and was awarded the CBE in the 1958 Birthday Honours for his work as director of MSIRI, helping to turn it into leading research organisation. He was elected a fellow of the Linnean Society of London in 1938.

He published papers on plant pathology, ecology, and on the flora of Mauritius. Pandanus wiehei Bosser & J.Guého and Panicum wiehei Renvoize are named in his honour.

He died unexpectedly of heart failure, 31 August 1975.

== Selected publications ==
Studies on the Vegetation of Mauritius: I. A Preliminary Survey of the Plant Communities. R. E. Vaughan, P. O. Wiehe (1937). Journal of Ecology, 25(2):289-343

Studies on the Vegetation of Mauritius: III. The Structure and Development of the Upland Climax Forest. R. E. Vaughan, P. O. Wiehe. (1941). Journal of Ecology, 29(1):127-160
