= Wayne P. Armstrong =

Natural historian, author and photographer

- Other names: Mr. Wolffia
- Occupations: Natural historian; Author; Photographer
- Known for: Creating the extensive online natural history textbook, Wayne's Word: An Online Textbook Of Natural History
- Website: Wayne's Word: An Online Textbook of Natural History

Wayne P. Armstrong (aka "Mr. Wolffia") is a natural historian, author, photographer and creator of the online natural history textbook, Wayne's Word: An Online Textbook Of Natural History.

His master's thesis was on Cupressus. He is an expert on the flora of North San Diego County. He wrote the section on Lemnaceae (duckweeds) in the revised Jepson Manual. He is a professor emeritus of botany at Palomar College, San Marcos, California.
