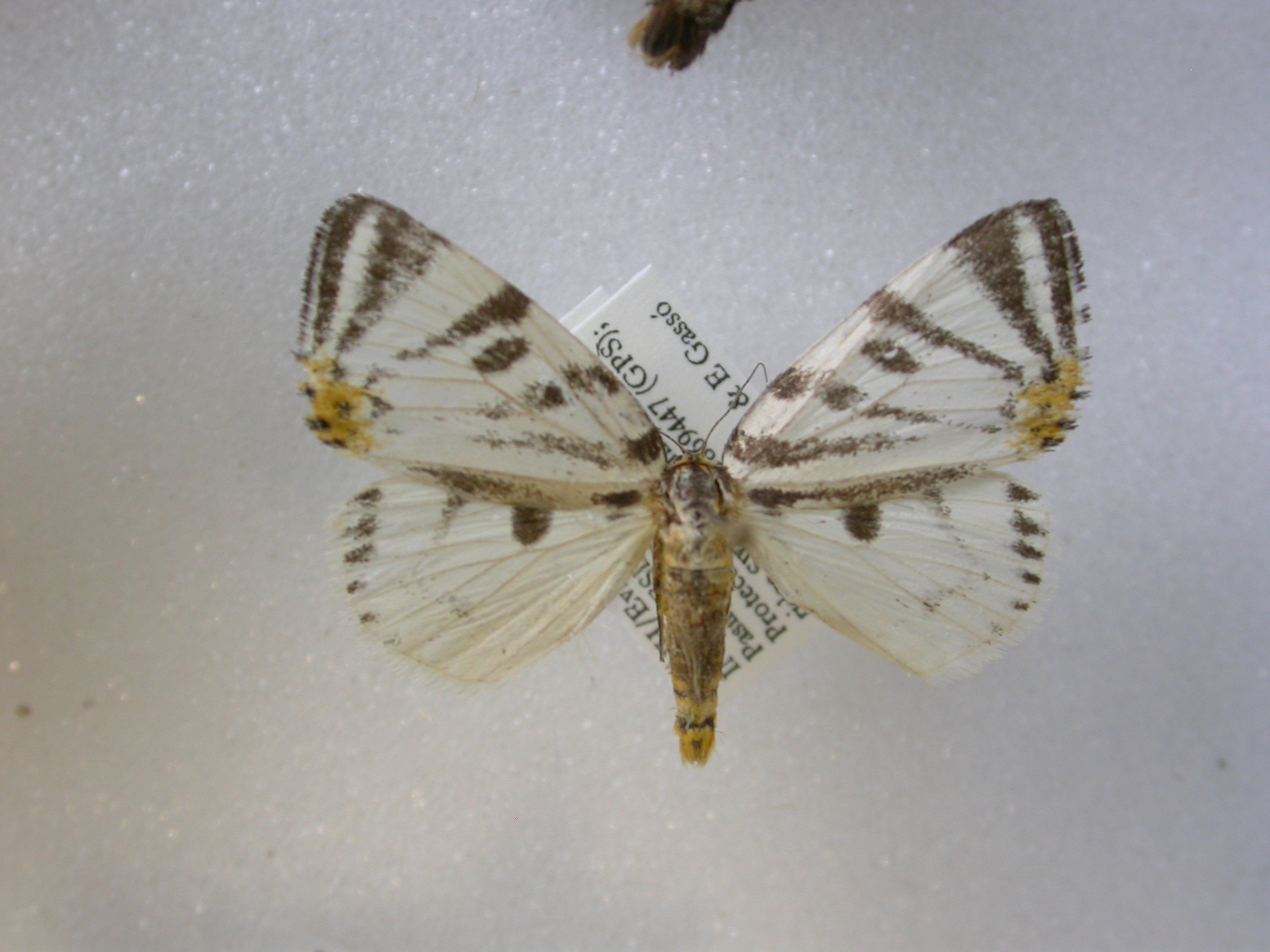

Scientific classification
- Domain: Eukaryota
- Kingdom: Animalia
- Phylum: Arthropoda
- Class: Insecta
- Order: Lepidoptera
- Superfamily: Noctuoidea
- Family: Nolidae
- Genus: Camptoloma
- Species: C. mirabilis

Binomial name
- Camptoloma mirabilis (Roepke, 1943)

Synonyms
- Leucopardus mirabilis Roepke, 1943

= Camptoloma mirabilis =

Species of moth

Camptoloma mirabilis is a moth of the family Nolidae first described by Roepke in 1943. It is found on Java, Peninsular Malaysia and Borneo. The species is found in montane habitats.

Adults have white wings with a series of dark grey stripes and spots, and the pale yellow forewing tornus.

== Subspecies ==
- Camptoloma mirabilis mirabilis
- Camptoloma mirabilis nigrior Holloway, 1976
