= Arthur Cronquist =

American botanist (1919–1992)

Arthur John Cronquist
- Born: March 19, 1919; San Jose, California
- Died: March 22, 1992 (aged 73); Provo, Utah
- Education: Idaho State University; Utah State University; University of Minnesota
- Known for: Cronquist system
- Awards: Linnean Medal (1986); Leidy Award (1970)
- Scientific career
- Fields: Botany
- Workplaces: New York Botanical Garden

Arthur John Cronquist (March 19, 1919 – March 22, 1992) was an American biologist, botanist and a specialist on Compositae. He is considered one of the most influential botanists of the 20th century, largely due to his formulation of the Cronquist system as well as being the primary co-author to the Flora of the Pacific Northwest, still the most up to date flora for three northwest U.S. States to date. Two plant genera in the aster family have been named in his honor. These are Cronquistia, a possible synonym of Carphochaete, and Cronquistianthus, which is sometimes included as a group within Eupatorium. The former was applied by R.M. King and the latter by him and Harold E. Robinson.

== Life ==
Arthur Cronquist was born on March 19, 1919, in San Jose, California, but he grew up outside of Portland, Oregon, as well as in Pocatello, Idaho. His parents divorced when he was young and he and his older sister were brought up by his mother, who worked for the Union Pacific Railroad in Pocatello. The young boy was an avid member of the Boy Scouts of America, through which he gained an appreciation for the outdoors. He did his undergraduate work at the Southern Branch of the University of Idaho (now Idaho State University). During his time there he studied field botany under Ray J. Davis, who was compiling the Flora of Idaho at the time. After receiving his bachelor's degree in 1938 in Biology, he went on to earn a master's degree in biology at Utah State University in 1940 working under Bassett Maguire. In the same year, he married Mabel Allred, whom he remained with until his death. They had two children and a fondness for cats.

Due to a childhood accident, Cronquist's right arm was partially disabled, making him unfit for military service in World War II. Instead he began work on his doctorate at the University of Minnesota under C.O. Rosendahl, earning his PhD in botany in 1944. His dissertation was a revision of the genus Erigeron. In 1943, while still working on his doctorate, he was offered a position at the New York Botanical Garden to work on Asteraceae for "The New Britton & Brown Illustrated Flora" then in preparation by Henry Gleason. From 1946 to 1948, he held a position at the University of Georgia, followed by a three-year position at Washington State University. Before returning to the New York Botanical Garden where he would spend the rest of his career, he worked as a botanist in Brussels with the U.S. Foreign Aid Program from 1951 to 1952. He died of heart failure on March 22, 1992, while studying specimens of Mentzelia at the herbarium at Brigham Young University.

== Work ==
=== Development of the Cronquist system ===
While Cronquist was in his mid-thirties, he began to question the usefulness of Adolf Engler & Karl Prantl's taxonomic system, laid down in their work Die Natürlichen Pflanzenfamilien (The Natural Plant Families), which had been the dominant system since the late 19th century. Although Cronquist was originally involved mostly with the family Asteraceae rather than with general systems, he began publishing on the topic in 1957 after much discussion with his peers concerning the challenge of forming a new taxonomic system. His initial publication (Cronquist, 1957) dealt purely with dicotyledons. At the time he began his work on his general scheme of classification, several others were working with the same goal in mind, including the American Robert F. Thorne, the Dane Rolf Dahlgren, and Armen Takhtajan of the U.S.S.R. Each of them would go on to produce their own taxonomic schemes, though Cronquist's would prove to be the most widely adopted. While working on the project in the 1960s, Cronquist came to be close friends with Armen Takhtajan and both men put all of their information at one another's disposal. To this end Cronquist decided to learn Russian in order to have access to the scientific literature that the Soviet Union had accumulated, which was largely unknown to the rest of the world. He made several trips to the U.S.S.R. to meet with Takhtajan and other Soviet botanists and translated many botanical works from Russian throughout his life.

Cronquist's first overview of classification was published in 1960, followed by his The Evolution and Classification of Flowering Plants in 1968 with a revised and expanded second edition being released in 1988. This work also was a survey of the practices of systematic botany. In 1981 he published his landmark work, An Integrated System of Classification of Flowering Plants. The work divided flowering plants into 2 classes with a number of subclasses and down to the family level, with each taxon being described and defined. The system would go on to be adopted by several major projects in floristics, including the Jepson Manual (1993), Flora of North America, Flora of China, Flora of Australia and of course Gleason and Cronquist's Manual of the Vascular Plants, which was published in 1991.

=== List of selected publications ===
Arthur Cronquist is probably best remembered for his work dealing with his Cronquist system, which was developed in these and other works:

- Cronquist, Arthur. (1957). Outline of a new system of families and orders of dicotyledons. Bull. Jard. Bot. Etat Brux. 27: 13–40.
- Cronquist, Arthur (October 1960). "The divisions and classes of plants". The Botanical Review. 26 (4): 425–482. Bibcode:1960BotRv..26..425C. doi:10.1007/BF02940572. S2CID 43144314.
- Cronquist, Arthur (September 1965). "The Status of the General System of Classification of Flowering Plants". Annals of the Missouri Botanical Garden. 52 (3): 281–303. doi:10.2307/2394794. JSTOR 2394794.
- Cronquist, Arthur; Takhtajan, Armen; Zimmermann, Walter (April 1966). "On the Higher Taxa of Embryobionta" (PDF). Taxon. 15 (4): 129–134. doi:10.2307/1217531. JSTOR 1217531.
- Cronquist, Arthur (1981). An integrated system of classification of flowering plants. New York: Columbia University Press. ISBN 978-0-231-03880-5.
- Cronquist, Arthur (1968). The evolution and classification of flowering plants (1st ed.). London: Nelson. ISBN 9780395053461.
- Cronquist, Arthur (1988) [1968]. The evolution and classification of flowering plants (2nd ed.). Bronx, N.Y., USA: New York Botanical Garden. ISBN 9780893273323. (Available here at Internet Archive)

== Bibliography ==
- Barkley, Theodore M. (1992), "In Memoriam: Arthur Cronquist: An Appreciation", Bulletin of the Torrey Botanical Club, 119 (4): 458–463, JSTOR 2996734
- "The Four Awards Bestowed by The Academy of Natural Sciences and Their Recipients". Proceedings of the Academy of Natural Sciences of Philadelphia. 156 (1). The Academy of Natural Sciences of Philadelphia: 403–404. June 2007. doi:10.1635/0097-3157(2007)156[403:TFABBT]2.0.CO;2. S2CID 198160356.
- The New York Botanical Garden: Arthur Cronquist
