= Walter Max Zimmermann =

German botanist

Walter Max Zimmermann (May 9, 1892 – June 30, 1980) was a German botanist and systematist. Zimmermann’s notions of classifying life objectively based on phylogenetic methods and on evolutionarily important characters were foundational for modern phylogenetics. Though they were later implemented by Willi Hennig in his fundamental work on phylogenetic systematics, Zimmermann's contributions to this field have largely been overlooked. Zimmermann also made several significant developments in the field of plant systematics such as the discovery of the telome theory. The standard botanical author abbreviation W.Zimm. is applied to species he described.

== Biography ==
Walter Zimmermann was born in Walldürn, Germany. He began his collegiate studies in 1910 at the University of Karlsruhe and later transferred to University of Freiburg in 1911. After transferring between the institutions of Friedrich Wilhelm University and University of Monaco and serving in World War I, he returned to the University of Freiburg where he completed his PhD degree in 1920. Zimmermann became a scientific assistant at the University of Freiburg’s Botanical Institute. At the University of Tübingen he taught as a private lecturer from 1925 to 1929, as an adjunct associate professor from 1929-1930, as an associate professor from 1930-1960, and as a full professor of botany from 1960 until retirement, and died in Tübingen in 1980. Throughout his lifetime he received numerous awards such as Honorary member of the Zoological-Botanical Society in Vienna, Honorary Member of the Association of German Biologists, and the Serge von Bubnoff Medal of the Geological Society of the GDR (1961), the Federal Service Cross, First Class (1962), and the Merit Medal of the State of Baden-Württemberg (1978).

== Major contributions ==
=== Modern phylogenetics ===
Zimmermann’s contributions to systematics have largely been overlooked, though Willi Hennig’s pivotal publication in 1966 on phylogenetic systematics cites Zimmermann multiple times. In fact, Hennig personally considered Zimmermann as “one of the most zealous of modern advocates of a consistent phylogenetic systematics.” Zimmermann’s principle paper contributing to modern systematics published in 1931 did not become widely available until 1937 and was located adjacent to articles of unrelated topics, possibly contributing to Zimmermann’s lack of recognition.

Most of Zimmermann's major contributions are contained in his 1931 publication that comprehensively reviews all current systematic methods in biology and provided novel insights into phylogenetic methods. His primary goal in classification was to separate the subject from the object, or attempting to characterize groups objectively rather than based on philosophical idealism and metaphysical properties. Though he recognized the importance of subjective human abstractions in categorizing organisms, he strayed as far from that view as possible when identifying key phylogenetic characters based on phenetic differences.

Zimmermann pinpointed three main phylogenetic methods of grouping organisms used during his time: special purpose, idealistic, and phylogenetic. The special purpose method involves the random choosing of basic forms or types for a practical purpose, which Zimmermann acknowledged as artificial. He considered biased the idealistic method, which focuses on a form chosen intuitively based on human idealism and does not need to actually exist in nature. Zimmermann campaigned for the phylogenetic method, an objective way of grouping organisms based on genealogy. He preferred the phylogenetic method because common ancestors once existed in reality and are not human constructs as in the case of these other two grouping methods. Though he acknowledged that these three methods can coexist, they should not be used together in the same system or same analysis. In other words, he proposed that organisms should be grouped based on whether they shared a recent phylogenetic splitting event or common ancestor.

Zimmermann is believed to be one of the few scientists to connect macroevolutionary processes with microevolutionary processes based on his mode of phylogenetic classification. Wolf-Ernst Reif (1986) in his review on macroevolution concludes that Zimmermann was successful at deducing this synthetic view of evolution prior to the completion of the formulation of Modern Synthesis. His methodology included three main steps: (1) identifying whether evolution has occurred in the given group, (2) determining the trajectory of evolution, and (3) revealing the causes of this evolutionary trajectory.

Zimmermann favored the reconstruction of phylogenetic lineages across species based on evolution of single phenotypic characters. He acknowledged that it is often impossible to know exactly the genealogical relationships between groups of organisms without experimentation, and basing phylogenetic relationships solely on phenetic similarities only increases the risk of influence of convergent evolution, parallel evolution, and atavism on analysis of evolutionary relationships.

=== Plant systematics ===
One of Zimmermann’s major goals was to improve the plant systematics and taxonomy using informative phylogenetic morphological and developmental characters, such as plant telomes. Specifically, Zimmermann founded the telome theory, stating that telomes, or the most terminal ends of dichotomizing plant branching systems, evolved to form more complex structures such as leaves, roots, and reproductive organs of ferns and other vascular plants. He utilized this theory in plant classification to reveal insights about how aquatic plants first colonized land and the evolution of basal vascular plants.

Tracing character state changes of single traits helped elucidate the evolutionary relationships between organisms, such as in identifying the parallel transition of isogamy to anisogamy. Zimmermann contributed insight into the evolution of the stele (central part of the root system of plants) by considering phylogenetic similarities and attempting to deduce its ancestral morphology. He tracked across plant phylogenies the common shifting of different plant tissues and organs, such as increases in the meristele number, pinnation of fern leaves, and the occurrence of plant neoteny. In addition, he aided in the classification and taxonomy of many plant groups, such as embryophytes.

== List of selected publications ==
- Zimmermann, Walter (1930). Die Phylogenie der Pflanzen. Jena, Germany: G. Fischer.
- Zimmermann, Walter (1931). "Arbeitsweise der botanischen Phylogenetik und anderer Cruppierungswissenschaften". In Abderhalden, E. Handbuch der biologischen Arbeitsmethoden. Berlin, Germany: Urban & Schwarzenberg. pp. 941–1053.
- Zimmermann, Walter (1934-07-01). "Research on Phylogeny of Species and of Single Characters". The American Naturalist. 68 (717): 381–384.
- Zimmermann, Walter (1938). "Die Telomtheorie". Biologe. 7: 385–391.
- Walter, Zimmermann; 1892- (1949-01-01). "Geschichte der Pflanzen". AGRIS: International Information System for the Agricultural Science and Technology (in German).
- Zimmermann, W. (1956-01-01). "On the Phylogeny of the Stele". Shokubutsugaku Zasshi. 69 (820-821): 401–409.
- Zimmermann, W (1961). "Phylogenetic Shifting of Organs, Tissues, and Phases in Pteridophytes". Canadian Journal of Botany. 39 (6): 1547–1553. Bibcode:1961CaJB...39.1547Z. doi:10.1139/b61-133.
- Zimmermann, Walter (1965). "Die Telomtheorie.". Fortschrifte der Evolutionsforschung Band I. Jena, Germany: G. Fischer.
- Cronquist, Arthur; Takhtajan, Armen; Zimmermann, Walter (April 1966). "On the Higher Taxa of Embryobionta" (PDF). Taxon. 15 (4): 129–134. Bibcode:1966Taxon..15..129C. doi:10.2307/1217531. JSTOR 1217531.

(also, sometimes, Zimmerm.)
