= Abraham Schöpfer =

German Northern Renaissance painter

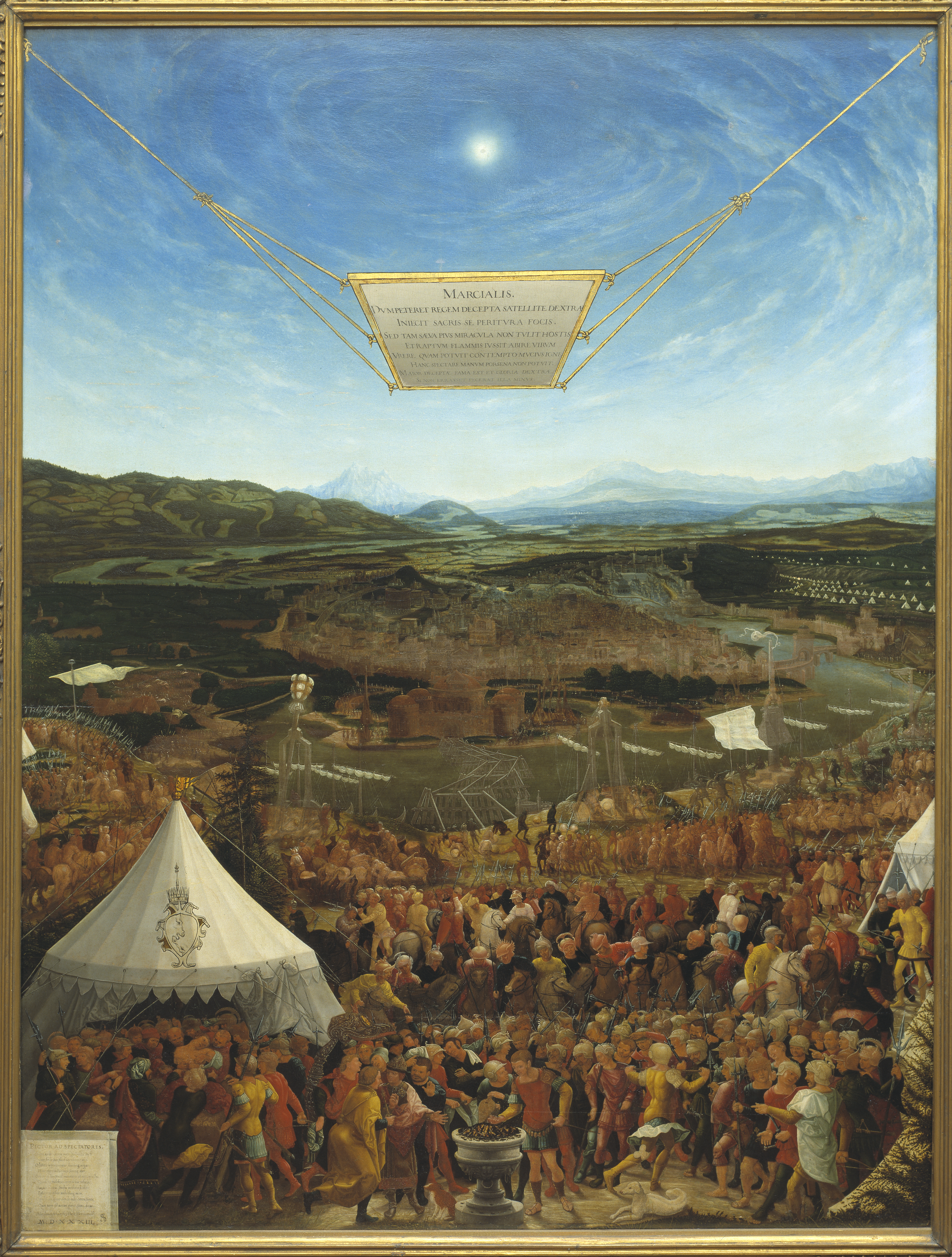
Mucius Scaevola before King Porsenna, by Abraham Schöpfer (National Museum of Sweden)

Abraham Schöpfer (fl. 16th century) was a German Northern Renaissance painter.

His best known work is probably Mucius Scaevola before King Porsena, from 1533, a scene based on Roman legend from the time of the birth of Rome (around 509 BC).
