= Václav Zelený =

Czech botanist and university professor

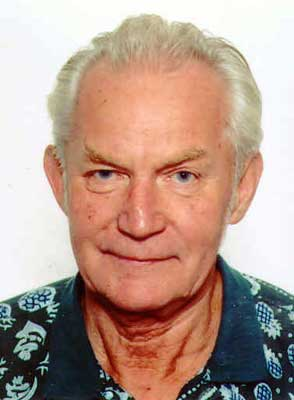
Václav Zelený

Václav Zelený (August 18, 1936, Prague, Czechoslovakia – November 3, 2020) was a Czech botanist and university teacher.

== Career ==
Václav Zelený was born in 1936 in Prague. In 1959 he graduated from the Faculty of Science of Charles University in Prague. He then worked at the Sugar Research Institute in Prague, Modřany and from 1962 he worked as an assistant professor at the Department of Botany and Plant Physiology of the Czech University of Life Sciences Prague. During his tenure, he published several books concerning his specializations, which were the flora of Podblanicko region and the flora of the Mediterranean. These are mainly the publications Plants of the Mediterranean (in Czech Rostliny Středozemí), Nature of Vlašim Castle Park: Vlašim Castle and Park and Castle Parks and Memorial Trees of Podblanicko (Příroda vlašimského zámeckého parku: zámek a park Vlašim a Zámecké parky a památné stromy Podblanicka); as a co-author he also contributed to a large publication published by Academia entitled Useful Plants of the Tropics and Subtropics (Užitkové rostliny tropů a subtropů) or to the Flora of the Czech Republic (Květena České republiky). He wrote almost 40 articles for Živa magazine. Václav Zelený was a member of several organizations, such as the Czech Botanical Society, the Blaník Protected Landscape Area, the Vietnamese Society and the Latin American Society.

The standard author abbreviation Zelený is used to indicate this person as the author when citing a botanical name.
