= Elsie May Zeile =

American botanist (1885–1988)

Elsie May Zeile (1885–1988) was an American botanist who studied Spermatophytes. She studied botany at the University of California, Berkeley, where she graduated with honors in May 1922. As a research assistant, she made contributions to the book A Manual of the Flowering Plants of California, by Professor Willis Linn Jepson. She is credited with discovering and classifying the Tiburon Paintbrush, named Castilleja neglecta Zeile. After she concluded her studies, she frequently gave lectures on botany and wild flowers to social organizations in San Francisco. An active member of the Sierra Club, she wrote an article for the Sierra Club Bulletin on the wildflowers of Yellowstone National Park. She also was a member of the California Botanical Society and served for a time as the organization's treasurer. In December 1930, at the age of 45, she married the widower Dr. Walter R. Lovegrove, a San Francisco dentist and champion chess player.

The standard author abbreviation Zeile is used to indicate this person as the author when citing a botanical name.
