= Charles René Zeiller =

French mining engineer and paleobotanist

Prof Charles René Zeiller HFRSE (14 January 1847 in Nancy – 27 November 1915 in Paris) was a French mining engineer and paleobotanist.

== Life ==
He studied at the École Polytechnique (1865–67) and at the École nationale supérieure des mines (1867–70), where from 1878 onward, he taught classes in paleobotany. In 1911 he was appointed vice-president of the Conseil général des mines.

In 1881 he became a member of the Société botanique de France, later serving as its vice-president (1898) and president (1899 and 1904). In 1893 he was named president of the Société géologique de France and from 1901 to 1915, was a member of the Académie des Sciences (botanical section).

The paleobotanical genera Zeilleria, Zeillerisporites and Zeilleropteris commemorate his name.

== Selected works ==
- Végétaux fossiles du terrain houiller de la France, 1880.
- Notes sur la flore bouillère des Asturies, 1882.
- Flore fossile (with Bernhard Renault), 1888–89.
- Étude sur la constitution de l'appareil fructificateur des Sphenophyllum, 1893.
- Éléments de paléobotanique, 1900.
- Flore fossile des gîtes de charbon du Tonkin, 1902.
