= Wilhelm Gottlieb Schneider =

Silesian-German entomologist, botanist and mycologist

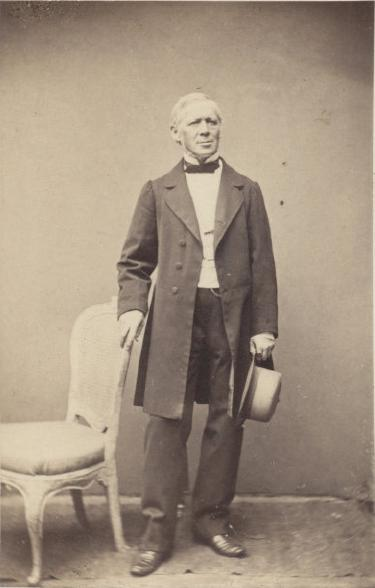

Wilhelm Gottlieb Schneider (8 May 1814 – 9 January 1889) was a Silesian-German entomologist, botanist and mycologist. As an entomologist he took a special interest in the Neuroptera and the Odonata. The dragonfly Gomphus schneiderii was named in his honour by Selys in 1840.

== Biography ==
Schneider was born in Breslau, the son of merchant Johann Heinrich Wilhelm Schneider. He graduated from the Maria Magdalena Gymnasium in 1834. At school he was influenced by the Silesian entomologist and teacher Theodor Emil Schummel. At the gymnasium he was taught by the mineralogist Glocker. He joined the University of Breslau to study the natural sciences and here he was influenced by Johann Ludwig Christian Gravenhorst. He then studied entomology and received a doctorate in 1843 with a dissertation titled Monographia generis Rhaphidiae Linnaei. He did not continue his habilitation and therefore did not join as a lecturer at the university but he continued to conduct research. Among his major works was a monograph on the lacewing genus Chrysopa. He also took an interest in minerals and meteorites. He described an iron meteorite found at Seeläsgeu and from 1864 he shifted his focus to fungi. From 1865 to 1887 he edited and distributed the exsiccata work Herbarium schlesischer Pilze. Schneider encouraged other Silesian botanists to collect including Gerhardt in Liegnitz, Cantor Dressier in Löwenberg, and Zimmermann in Striegau. He then compiled a work on the Silesian Phycomecetes around 1869. He described several new species including Synchylrium viride (Schn. 1871), Melanotaenium caulium (Schn. 1871), Thecaphora ajfinis (Schn. 1874), and Puccinia sessilis (Schn. 1869). A species of rust found on Thymus chamaedrys was named as Puccinia Schneideri. He was a member of the Silesian entomological society from 1878.
