= Zeiler =

Zeiler is a German surname. Notable people with the surname include:

- Arthur Zeiler (born 1988), German rugby union player
- Gail Zeiler (1950–2016), American singer known professionally as Kacey Jones
- Gerhard Zeiler (born 1955), president of Turner International
- John Zeiler (born 1982), American ice hockey player
- Martin Zeiler (1589–1661), German writer
- Peter Zeiler (born 1970), German footballer
