= William-Henri Schopfer =

Swiss botanist (1900–1962)

William-Henri Schopfer (8 May 1900 – 19 June 1962) was a Swiss plant physiologist who worked at the University of Bern. He examined the role of vitamins in plants.

Schopfer was born in Yverdon to foreman Henry-Louis and Adele-Elisabeth née Hofer. He studied biology in Geneva under Robert Chodat and then worked with Hans Kniep in Berlin, obtaining a doctorate from Geneva in 1928. He then taught at high school before joining the University of Bern. His work was on vitamins and their role in plants. He showed that Phycomyces cannot survive without vitamin B1.
