= List of botanists by author abbreviation (C) =

This is an incomplete list of botanists by their author abbreviation, which is designed for citation with the botanical names or works that they have published. This list follows that established by Brummitt & Powell (1992). Use of that list is recommended by Rec. 46A Note 1 of the International Code of Nomenclature for algae, fungi, and plants. The list is kept up to date online at The International Plant Names Index and Index Fungorum.

In some cases an "author abbreviation" consists of a full surname, while in other cases the surname is abbreviated and/or accompanied by one or more initials. There is no space between the initials and the surname (or its abbreviation).

==== Order of entries ====
The list here is maintained strictly in order of the alphabetic characters in the abbreviation; thus "A.B.Jacks." appears under "A" not "J", and is located as if the characters were "ABJACKS". Capitalization is ignored as are all non-alphabetic characters such as "." and space. Diacritical marks are also ignored, so that, e.g., "ü" is treated as if it were "u".

==== Navigation ====
Because of its length, the list is split across separate pages. All alphabetic sections can be accessed from the short table of contents; the vertical bars show the page divisions. Searching will only find an entry within a page.

== A–B ==
Contents:	A	B	C	D	E F	G	H	I J	K L	M	N O	P	Q R	S	T U V	W X Y Z

To find entries for A–B, use the table of contents above.

== C ==
Contents: Top	A	B	C	D	E F	G	H	I J	K L	M	N O	P	Q R	S	T U V	W X Y Z

=== CA ===
- C.A.Arnold – Chester Arthur Arnold (1901–1977)
- Cabactulan – Derek Cabactulan (fl. 2016)
- Cabanès – Jean Gustave Cabanès (1864–1944)
- C.A.Barber – Charles Alfred Barber (1860–1933)
- C.Abbot – Charles Abbot (1761–1817)
- C.Abel – Clarke Abel (1789–1826)
- Cabezudo – Baltasar Cabezudo (born 1946)
- Caboň – Miroslav Caboň (fl. 2018)
- C.A.Br. – Clair Alan Brown (1903–1982)
- Cabrera – Ángel Lulio Cabrera (1908–1999) (not to be confused with botanist Ángel Cabrera (1879–1960))
- C.A.Clark – Carolyn A. Clark (fl. 1979)
- Cadet – Thérésian Cadet (1937–1987)
- Cady – Leonard Isaacs Cady (born 1933)
- Cáfal – Rudolf Cáfal (fl. 2023)
- Caflisch – Jakob Friedrich Caflisch (1817–1882)
- C.Agardh – Carl Adolph Agardh (1785–1859)
- C.A.Gardner – Charles Austin Gardner (1896–1970)
- Cajander – Aimo Cajander (1879–1943)
- Calder – James Alexander Calder (1915–1990)
- Calderón – Graciela Calderón (1931–2022)
- Calest. – Vittorio Calestani (1882–1949)
- Caley – George Caley (1770–1829)
- Callm. – Martin Wilhelm Callmander (born 1975)
- Calonge – Francisco de Calonge (born 1938)
- Calvin - Clyde L. Calvin (1934-)
- Calzada – Juan Ismael Calzada (fl. 1997)
- Camarda – Ignazio Camarda (born 1946)
- Cambage – Richard Hind Cambage (1859–1928)
- Cambess. – Jacques Cambessèdes (1799–1863)
- Cameron – Alexander Kenneth Cameron (born 1908)
- C.A.Mey. – Carl Anton von Meyer (1795–1855)
- Caminhoá – Joaquim Monteiro Caminhoá (1835–1896)
- Camp – Wendell Holmes Camp (1904–1963)
- Campacci – Marcos Antonio Campacci (born 1948)
- Campb. – Douglas Houghton Campbell (1859–1953)
- Campd. – Francisco Campderá (also François Campderá) (1793–1862)
- Camper – Petrus Camper (1722–1789)
- Campb.-Young – Gael Jean Campbell-Young (born 1973)
- Camus – Giulio (Jules) Camus (1847–1917)
- Canby – William Marriott Canby (1831–1904)
- Canne-Hill. – Judith Marie Canne-Hilliker (also Judith Marie Canne) (1943–2013) (also Canne)
- Cannon – John Francis Michael Cannon (1930–2008)
- Cantley – Nathaniel Cantley (1847–1888)
- Cantor – Theodore Cantor (1809–1854)
- C.A.Paris – Catherine A. Paris (born 1962)
- Capit. – Louis Capitaine (1883–1923)
- Capuron – René Paul Raymond Capuron (1921–1971)
- Carbonó – Eduino Carbonó de la Hoz (born 1950)
- Cárdenas – Martín Cárdenas (1899–1973)
- Cardona – María de los Angeles Cardona (1940–1991)
- Cardot – Jules Cardot (1860–1934)
- Carestia – Antonio Carestia (1825–1908)
- Carey – William Carey (1761–1834)
- Cariot – Antoine Cariot (1820–1883)
- Carleton – Mark Alfred Carleton (1866–1925)
- Carlquist – Sherwin Carlquist (1930–2021)
- Carlson – Margery Claire Carlson (1892–1985)
- Carnevali – Germán Carnevali (born 1955)
- Carolin – Roger Charles Carolin (1929–2025)
- Caro – José Aristide Caro (1919–1985)
- Carp – Daniel Waterman Crane (1847–1922) ("Carp" was Crane's pen name.)
- Carr – Cedric Errol Carr (1892–1936)
- Carrasco – Maruja Carrasco (1944–2018)
- Carrick – John Carrick (1914–1978)
- Carrière – Élie-Abel Carrière (1818–1896)
- Carrington – Benjamin Carrington (1827–1893)
- Carruth. – William Carruthers (1830–1922)
- Carson – Joseph Carson (1808–1876)
- Caruel – Théodore Caruel (1830–1898)
- Carus – Carl Gustav Carus (1789–1869)
- Carver – George Washington Carver (1864–1943)
- Casar. – Giovanni Casaretto (1812–1879)
- C.A.Schenck – Carl Alwin Schenck (1868–1955)
- C.A.Sm. – Christo Albertyn Smith (1898–1956)
- Casp. – Johann Xaver Robert Caspary (1818–1887)
- Casper – Siegfried Jost Casper (1929–2021)
- Cass. – Alexandre Henri Gabriel de Cassini (1781–1832)
- Cassone – Felice Cassone (1815–1854)
- Castagne – Jean Louis Martin Castagne (1785–1858)
- Castañeda – Marcelino Castañeda y Nuñez de Caceres (fl. 1954)
- Cast.-Campos – Gonzalo Castillo-Campos (born 1953)
- Castelnau – François Louis Nompar de Caumat de Laporte Castelnau (1810–1880)
- Castetter – Edward Franklin Castetter (1896–1978)
- Castrov. – Santiago Castroviejo (1946–2009)
- Catling – Paul Miles Catling (born 1947)
- Cav. – Antonio José Cavanilles (1745–1804)
- Cavaco – Alberto Júdice Leote Cavaco (1915–2001)
- Cavanagh – Lucy Mary Cavanagh (1871–1936)
- Cavara – Fridiano Cavara (1857–1929)
- Cavestro – William Cavestro (fl. 1999)
- Cavill. – François Georges Cavillier (1868-1953)
- C.A.Weber – Carl Albert Weber (1856–1931)
- Cayzer – A. Cayzer (fl. 1922)

=== CB-CG ===
- C.Bab. – Churchill Babington (1821–1889)
- C.Bandara – Champika Bandara (fl. 2020)
- C.Barbosa – César Barbosa (born 1954)
- C.Bauhin – Gaspard Bauhin (1560–1624)
- C.Bayer – Clemens Bayer (born 1961)
- C.B.Beck – Charles B. Beck (fl. 1958–1967)
- C.B.Clarke – Charles Baron Clarke (1832–1906)
- C.Beards. – Cam Beardsell (fl. 1992)
- C.B.Rob. – Charles Budd Robinson (1871–1913)
- C.C.Berg – Cornelis Christiaan Berg (1934–2012)
- C.C.Chang – Chao Chien Chang (1900–1972)
- C.C.Chinnappa – Chendanda Chengappa Chinnappa (born 1939)
- C.C.Curtis – Carlton Clarence Curtis (1864–1945)
- C.C.Gmel. – Carl Christian Gmelin (1762–1837)
- C.C.Hall – Carlotta Case Hall (1880–1949)
- C.Chr. – Carl Christensen (1872–1942)
- C.C.Hu – Chia Chi Hu (born 1932)
- C.C.Huang – Cheng Chiu Huang (born 1922)
- C.Clark – James Curtis Clark (born 1951)
- C.Clarke – Charles M. Clarke (fl. 1999)
- C.C.Robin – Charles César Robin (born 1750)
- C.C.Tseng – Charles Chiao Tseng (born 1932)
- C.D.Adams – Charles Dennis Adams (1920–2005)
- C.D.Bailey – C. Donovan Bailey (fl. 2001)
- C.D.Bouché – Carl David Bouché (1809–1881)
- C.DC. – Anne Casimir Pyrame de Candolle (1836–1918)
- C.D.Darl. – Cyril Dean Darlington (1903–1981)
- C.De Jong – Cornelis De Jong (fl. 1985)
- C.Deori – Chaya Deori (born 1974)
- C.D.K.Cook – Christopher David Kentish Cook (1933–1990)
- C.D.Liu – Chu Dian Liu (fl. 2007)
- C.D.Specht – Chelsea D. Specht (fl. 2006)
- C.D.White – Charles David White (1862–1935)
- C.E.A.Winslow – Charles-Edward Amory Winslow (1877–1957)
- Ceballos – Luis Ceballos y Fernández de Córdoba (1896–1967)
- C.E.Bertrand – Charles Eugène Bertrand (1851–1917)
- C.E.Calderón – Cleofé Elsa Calderón (1929–2007)
- C.E.C.Fisch. – Cecil Ernest Claude Fischer (1874–1950)
- C.E.Cramer – Carl Eduard Cramer (1831–1901)
- C.E.Cumm. – Carlos Emmons Cummings (1878–1964)
- C.E.Hubb. – Charles Edward Hubbard (1900–1980)
- C.E.Jarvis – Charles Edward Jarvis (born 1954)
- Čelak. – Ladislav Josef Čelakovský (1834–1902)
- C.Elliott – Charlotte Elliott (1883–1974)
- Celsius – Olof Celsius (1670–1756) (uncle of astronomer Anders Celsius)
- C.E.O.Jensen – Christian Erasmus Otterstrøm (Otterström) Jensen (1859–1941)
- C.E.Parkinson – Charles Edward Parkinson (1890–1945)
- Cerv. – Vicente de Cervantes (1755–1829)
- Ces. – Vincenzo de Cesati (1806–1883)
- Cesalpino – Andrea Cesalpino (1519–1603)
- C.F.Baker – Charles Fuller Baker (1872–1927)
- C.F.Barrett – Craig Barrett (botanist) (fl. 2021)
- C.F.Culb. – Chicita Frances (Forman) Culberson (1931–2023)
- C.F.Fang – Cheng Fu Fang (born 1925)
- C.F.Gaertn. – Karl Friedrich von Gaertner (1772–1850)
- C.Fisch – Carl Fisch (born 1859)
- C.F.Ludw. – Christian Friedrich Ludwig (1757–1823)
- C.F.Reed – Clyde Franklin Reed (1918–1999)
- C.F.Schmidt – Carl Friedrich Schmidt (1811–1890)
- C.F.Wilkins – Carolyn F. Wilkins (born 1945)
- C.Gao – Chien Gao (1929–2016)
- C.G.F.Hochst. – Christian Gottlob Ferdinand von Hochstetter (1829–1884)
- C.G.Matthew – Charles Geekie Matthew (1862–1936)
- C.G.Westerl. – Carl Gustaf Westerlund (1864–1914)

=== CH ===
- Chabaud – J.Benjamin Chabaud (1833–1915)
- Chabert – Alfred Chabert (1836–1916)
- Chadim – Vaclav Anthony Chadim (born 1929)
- Chaix – Dominique Chaix (1730–1799)
- Chakr. – Paritosh Chakraborty (born 1949)
- Chakrab. – Tapas Chakrabarty (born 1954)
- Chakrav. – Hira Lal Chakravarty (1907–1998 or 2000)
- Chalermglin – Piya Chalermglin (fl. 2000)
- Challinor – Richard Westman Challinor (1871–1951)
- Cham. – Adelbert von Chamisso (1781–1838)
- Chamb. – Charles Joseph Chamberlain (1863–1943)
- Chambray – Georges de Chambray (1783–1849)
- Champ. – John George Champion (1815–1854)
- Champl. – Dominique Champluvier (born 1953)
- Chantar. – Pranom Chantaranothai (born 1955)
- Chao Chen – Chao Chen (fl. 2022)
- Chaowasku – Tanawat Chaowasku (fl. 2006)
- Chapm. – Alvan Wentworth Chapman (1809–1899)
- Chappill – Jennifer Anne Chappill (1959–2006)
- C.Hartm. – Carl Hartman (1824–1884)
- Chase – Mary Agnes Chase (1869–1963)
- Chassot – Philippe Chassot (fl. 2003)
- Châtel. – Jean Jacques Châtelain (1736–1822)
- Chatterjee – Debabarta Chatterjee (1911–1960)
- Chatton – Édouard Chatton (1883–1947)
- Chaub. – Louis Athanase Chaubard (1785–1854)
- Chaudhri – Mohammad Nazeer Chaudhri (1932–2010)
- Chaumeton – François-Pierre Chaumeton (1775–1819)
- Chautems – Alain Chautems (fl. 1984)
- Chav. – Édouard Louis Chavannes (1805–1861)
- Cházaro – Miguel de Jesús Cházaro Basáñez (1949–2023)
- C.H.Blom – Carl Hilding Blom (1888–1972)
- C.H.Curtis – Charles Henry Curtis (1869–1958)
- C.H.Eberm. – Carl Heinrich Ebermaier (1802–1870)
- Cheek – Martin Roy Cheek (born 1960)
- Cheel – Edwin Cheel (1872–1951)
- Cheeseman – Thomas Frederic Cheeseman (1846–1923)
- Cheesman – Ernest Entwistle Cheesman (1898–1983)
- C.H.Ellis – Charles Howard Ellis (born 1929)
- Chenault – Léon Chenault (1853–1930)
- Cherd. – Valentina Yakovlevna Cherdantseva (born 1939)
- Cheremis. – Elena Andreevna Cheremisinova (born 1915)
- Cherler – Johann Heinrich Cherler (1570–1610)
- Cherm. – Henri Chermezon (1885–1939)
- Cherm.Mir. – Vicente Chermont de Miranda (1849–1907)
- Cheshm. – Ilija Vasilev Cheshmedjiev (born 1930)
- Chess. – Pascale Chesselet (born 1959)
- Chevall. – François Fulgis Chevallier (1796–1840)
- Chew – Wee-Lek Chew (born 1932)
- C.H.Hasse – Clara H. Hasse (1880–1926)
- Chi.C.Lee – Ch'ien C. Lee (fl. 2002)
- Chilton – Charles Chilton (1860–1929)
- Ching – Ren-Chang Ching (1898–1986)
- Chinnock – Robert Chinnock (born 1943)
- Chin S.Chang – Chin Sung Chang (born 1959)
- Chiov. – Emilio Chiovenda (1871–1941)
- Chippend. – George McCartney Chippendale (1921–2010)
- Chippind. – Lucy Katherine Armitage Chippindall (1913–1992)
- Chiron – Guy Robert Chiron (born 1944)
- Chitaley – Shya Chitaley (1918–2013)
- Chitt. – Frederick James Chittenden (1873–1950)
- C.H.Lank. – Charles Herbert Lankester (1879–1969)
- Chmiel – Edward Chmiel (fl. 2013) (not to be confused with Chmiel., Jerry G. Chmielewski)
- Chmiel. – Jerry G. Chmielewski (fl. 1987) (not to be confused with Chmiel, Edward Chmiel)
- C.H.Mull. – Cornelius Herman Muller (1909–1997)
- Chodat – Robert Hippolyte Chodat (1865–1934)
- Choisy – Jacques Denys Choisy (1799–1859)
- Cholnoky – Béla Jenő Cholnoky (1899–1972)
- Chopinet – Robert G. Chopinet (1914–1975)
- Chouard – Pierre Chouard (1903–1983)
- Christ – Konrad Hermann Heinrich Christ (1833–1933)
- Christenh. – Maarten Joost Maria Christenhusz (born 1976)
- Christenson – Eric Alston Christenson (1956–2011)
- Christian – Harold Basil Christian (1871–1950)
- Christoph. – Erling Christophersen (1898–1994)
- Chrtek – Jindřich Chrtek (born 1930)
- C.H.Stirt. – Charles Howard Stirton (born 1946)
- Chud. – René Chudeau (1864–1921)
- Chun – Woon Young Chun (1890–1971)
- C.H.Wright – Charles Henry Wright (1864–1941)

=== CI-CN ===
- C.I.Blanche – Charles Isodore Blanche (1823–1887)
- Cif. – Raffaele Ciferri (1897–1964)
- Cikovac – Pavle Cikovac (fl. 2007)
- Cirillo – Domenico Cirillo (1739–1799)
- C.J.Brand – Charles John Brand (1879–1949)
- C.J.Burrows – Colin James Burrows (born 1931)
- C.Jeffrey – Charles Jeffrey (1934–2022)
- C.J.French – Christopher J. French (fl. 2012)
- C.J.Gould – Charles Jay Gould (1912–1997)
- C.J.Hook – Cathy J. Hook (fl. 2016)
- C.J.Saldanha – Cecil John Saldanha (1926–2002)
- C.J.Seth – Christopher J. Seth (fl. 1984)
- C.J.Webb – Colin James Webb (born 1949)
- C.K.Allen – Caroline Kathryn Allen (1904–1975)
- C.K.Liao – Chun Kuei Liao (fl. 2013)
- C.K.Lim – Chong Keat Lim (fl. 1996)
- C.Kramer – Carl Kramer (1843–1882)
- C.Krauss – Christian Ferdinand Friedrich von Krauss (1812–1890)
- C.K.Schneid. – Camillo Karl Schneider (1876–1951)
- C.K.Spreng. – Christian Konrad (Conrad) Sprengel (1750–1816)
- Claassen – Martha Isabella Claassen (born 1931)
- Clairv. – Joseph Philippe de Clairville (1742–1830)
- C.L.Anderson – Charles Lewis Anderson (1827–1910)
- Clap. – Jean Louis René Antoine Édouard Claparède (1832–1871)
- Clapperton – Bain Hugh Clapperton (1788–1827)
- Clarion – Jacques Clarion (1776–1844)
- Clark – Jane Jessie Clark (1881–1914)
- Clarke – Benjamin Clarke (1813–1890)
- Clarkson – Edward Hale Clarkson (1866–1934)
- Claus – Karl Ernst Claus (1796–1894)
- Clausager – Karen Clausager (fl. 2003)
- Clausen – Peter Clausen (dates unclear, 1801–1872 or 1804–1855)
- Clausing – Gudrun Clausing (born 1969), see also her married name abbreviation G.Kadereit
- Claussen – Peter Claussen (1877–1959)
- Claypole – Edward Waller Claypole (1835–1901)
- Clayton – William Derek Clayton (1926–2023)
- C.L.Boynton – Charles Lawrence Boynton (1864–1943)
- C.L.Chan – Chew Lun Chan (fl. 1990)
- Cleghorn – Hugh Francis Clarke Cleghorn (1820–1895)
- Cleland – John Burton Cleland (1878–1971)
- Clem. – Frederick Edward Clements (1874–1945)
- Clemants – Steven Earl Clemants (1954–2008)
- Clémencet – Marien Clémencet (L. Clémencet in IPNI) (fl. 1932)
- Clémençon – Heinz Clémençon (born 1935)
- Clement – Ian Duncan Clement (born 1917)
- Clemente – Simón de Roxas (Rojas) Clemente y Rubio (1777–1827)
- Clementi – Giuseppe C. Clementi (1812–1873)
- Clemesha – Stephen Chapman Clemesha (born 1942)
- Clem.-Muñoz – M. Clemente-Muñoz (fl. 1986)
- Clevel. – Daniel Cleveland (1838–1929)
- C.Lewis – Carl E. Lewis (fl. 2006)
- C.L.Fenton – Carroll Lane Fenton (1900–1969)
- C.L.Hitchc. – Charles Leo Hitchcock (1902–1986)
- Clifford – Harold Trevor Clifford (1927–2019)
- Clifton – George Clifton (1823–1913)
- Clinton – George William Clinton (1807–1885)
- C.L.Leakey – Colin Louis Avern Leakey (1933–2018)
- C.L.Long – Chun Lin Long ( fl. 1998)
- Clos – Dominique Clos (1821–1908)
- Clover – Elzada Urseba Clover (1896–1980)
- C.L.Scott – Charles Leslie Scott (1913–2001)
- C.L.Tso – Ching Lieh Tso
- Clus. – Carolus Clusius (or Charles de l'Écluse) (1526–1609)
- Clute – Willard Nelson Clute (1869–1950)
- C.L.Woodw. – Catherine L. Woodward (fl. 2007)
- C.L.Yeh – Ching Long Yeh (fl. 2006)
- C.Marquand – Cecil Victor Boley Marquand (1897–1943)
- C.Martin – Charles-Édouard Martin (1847–1937)
- C.Massal. – Caro Benigno Massalongo (1852–1958)
- C.Merck – Carl Merck (1761–1799)
- C.M.Kuo – Chen Meng Kuo (born 1948)
- C.Mohr – Charles Theodore Mohr (1824–1901)
- C.Moore – Charles Moore (1820–1905)
- C.Morel – Charles Morel (born 1793)
- C.Morren – Charles François Antoine Morren (1807–1858)
- C.M.Taylor – Charlotte Morley Taylor (born 1955)
- C.M.Weiller – Carolyn M. Weiller (fl. 1995)
- C.Nelson – Cirilo Nelson (alternative name: Cyril Hardy Nelson Sutherland) (1938–2020)
- C.N.Forbes – Charles Noyes Forbes (1883–1920)
- C.Norman – Cecil Norman (1872–1947)
- C.N.Page – Christopher Nigel Page (1942–2002)

=== CO ===
- Co – Leonardo Legaspi Co (1953–2010)
- Coates – F. Coates (fl. 1997)
- Coaz – Johann Coaz (1822–1918)
- Cobb – Nathan Augustus Cobb (1859–1932)
- Cocc. – Girolamo Cocconi (1822–1904)
- Cochet – Pierre Charles Marie Cochet (1866–1936)
- Cockayne – Leonard C. Cockayne (1855–1934)
- Cockburn – Peter Francis Cockburn (born 1946)
- Cockerell – Theodore Dru Alison Cockerell (1866–1948)
- Cockerton – Geoff T.B. Cockerton (fl. 2011)
- Cocks – John Cocks (1787–1861)
- Cocquyt – Christine Cocquyt (born 1955)
- Codd – Leslie Edward Wostall Codd (1908–1999)
- Cogn. – Alfred Cogniaux (1841–1916)
- Cogollo – Alvaro Cogollo (fl. 1993)
- Cohn – Ferdinand Julius Cohn (1828–1898)
- Coincy – Auguste-Henri de Coincy (1837–1903)
- Coker – William Chambers Coker (1872–1953)
- Colas. – Maria Antonietta (Maretta) Colasante (born 1944)
- Colden – Jane Colden (1724–1766)
- Colebr. – Henry Thomas Colebrooke (1765–1837)
- Coleby – David Coleby (fl. 2015)
- Colenso – William Colenso (1811–1899)
- Colla – Luigi Aloysius Colla (1766–1848)
- Collad. – Louis Théodore Frederic Colladon (1792–1862)
- Collen. – Iris Sheila Collenette (1927–2017)
- Collett – Henry Collett (1836–1901)
- Collie – Alexander Collie (1793–1835)
- Collins – Frank Shipley Collins (1848–1920)
- Collinson – Peter Collinson (1694–1768)
- Colmeiro – Miguel Colmeiro (1816–1901)
- Colomb – Marie Louis Georges Colomb (1856–1945)
- Columbus – James Travis Columbus (born 1962)
- Colvill – James Colvill (c.1777–1832)
- Comes – Orazio Comes (1848–1923)
- Comm. – Philibert Commerçon (1727–1773)
- Compton – Robert Harold Compton (1886–1979)
- Conant – Norman Francis Conant (1908–1984)
- Cond. – Charles Marie de La Condamine (1701–1774)
- Conforti – Visitación Conforti (born 1953)
- Congdon – Joseph Whipple Congdon (1834–1910)
- Conger – Paul Sidney Conger (1897–1979)
- Congiu – Angelino Congiu (fl. 2012)
- Connor – Henry Eamonn Connor (1922–2016)
- Conrad – Solomon White Conrad (1779–1831)
- Conran – John Godfrey Conran (born 1960)
- Console – Michelangelo Console (1812–1897)
- Constance – Lincoln Constance (1909–2001)
- Constant. – Ovidiu Constantinescu (1933–2012)
- Contandr. – Juliette Contandriopoulos (1922–2011)
- Conw. – Hugo Conwentz (1855–1922)
- Conz. – Cassiano Conzatti (1862–1951)
- Coode – Mark James Elgar Coode (born 1937)
- Cook – James Cook (1728–1779)
- Cooke – Mordecai Cubitt Cooke (1825–1914)
- Cookson – Isabel Clifton Cookson (1893–1973)
- Coombs – Frank Andrew Coombs (1877-1964)
- Cooper – Daniel Cooper (1817?–1842)
- Cooperr. – Tom Smith Cooperrider (born 1927)
- Cootes – James Edward Cootes (born 1950)
- Cope – Thomas Arthur Cope (born 1949)
- Copel. – Edwin Bingham Copeland (1873–1964)
- Copley – Peter Bruce Copley (born 1956)
- Copp. – Amédée Coppey (1874–1913)
- Coppins – Brian John Coppins (born 1949)
- Corb. – François Marie Louis Corbière (1850–1941)
- Corbishley – Amy Gertrude Corbishley (1889–1977)
- Corda – August Carl Joseph Corda (1809–1849)
- Cordem. – Eugène Jacob de Cordemoy (1835–1911)
- Core – Earl Lemley Core (1902–1984)
- Corill. – Robert J. Corillion (1908–1997)
- Cornejo – Xavier Cornejo (fl. 2002)
- Corner – Edred John Henry Corner (1906–1996)
- Cornut – Jacques-Philippe Cornut (c. 1606–1651)
- Corrêa – José Francisco Corrêa da Serra (1751–1823)
- Correll – Donovan Stewart Correll (1908–1983)
- Correns – Carl Correns (1864–1933)
- Corrick – Margaret Georgina Corrick (1922–2020)
- Cortauld – Sydney Cortauld (1840–1899)
- Cortés – Santiago Cortés (1854–1924)
- Cortesi – Fabrizio Cortesi (1879–1949)
- Cory – Victor Louis Cory (1880–1964)
- Coss. – Ernest Saint-Charles Cosson (1819–1889)
- Costantin – Julien Noël Costantin (1857–1936)
- Costerm. – Leon F. Costermans (born 1933)
- Cothen. – Christian Andreas von Cothenius (1708–1789)
- Cotton – Arthur Disbrowe Cotton (1879–1962)
- Coult. – Thomas Coulter (1793–1843)
- Courchet – Lucien Désiré Joseph Courchet (1851–1924)
- Court – Arthur Bertram Court (1927–2012)
- Courtec. – Régis Courtecuisse (born 1956)
- Courtney – Shannel P. Courtney (fl. 2008)
- Courtois – Richard Joseph Courtois (1806–1835)
- Coustur. – Paul Cousturier (1849–1921)
- Cout. – António Xavier Pereira Coutinho (1851–1939)
- Coville – Frederick Vernon Coville (1867–1937)
- Cowan – John Macqueen Cowan (1891–1960)
- Cowie – Ian D. Cowie (fl. 1994)
- Cowles – Henry Chandler Cowles (1869–1930)
- Cowley – Elizabeth Jill Cowley (born 1940)
- Cox – Euan Hillhouse Methven Cox (1893–1977)

=== CP-CT ===
- C.Palmer – Charles Mervin Palmer (1900–1981)
- C.Poulsen – Christian Poulsen (paleontologist) (fl. 1974)
- C.P.Raju – C. Prabhakar Raju (born 1962)
- C.Presl – Carl Borivoj Presl (1794–1852)
- C.P.Robin – Charles Philippe Robin (1821–1885)
- C.P.Sm. – Charles Piper Smith (1877–1955)
- Crabbe – James Albert Crabbe (1914–2002)
- Crabtree – D. R. Crabtree (fl. 1983–1990)
- Cragin – Francis Whittemore Cragin (1858–1937)
- Craib – William Grant Craib (1882–1933)
- Craig – Thomas Craig (1839–1916)
- Cralley – Elza Monroe Cralley (1905–1999)
- C.Ramesh – Ch. Ramesh (fl. 1986)
- Crampton – Beecher Crampton (1918–2002)
- Crand. – Bowen Sinclair Crandall (born 1909)
- Crand.-Stotl. – Barbara Jean Crandall-Stotler (born 1942)
- Crane – Fern Ward Crane (1906–1984)
- Cranfield – Raymond Jeffrey Cranfield (born 1947)
- Cranfill – Raimond Cranfill (fl. 1981)
- Crantz – Heinrich Johann Nepomuk von Crantz (1722–1799)
- Cranwell – Lucy May Cranwell (1907–2000)
- Cranz – David Cranz (1723–1777)
- Cratty – Robert Irwin Cratty (1853–1940)
- Craveiro – Sandra Carla Craveiro (born 1969)
- Craven – Lyndley Alan Craven (1945–2014)
- Crawshay – Richard Crawshay (1862–1958)
- Crayn – Darren M. Crayn (fl. 1998)
- C.R.Ball – Carleton Roy Ball (1873–1958)
- C.R.Bell – Clyde Ritchie Bell (1921–2013)
- C.Rchb. – Carl (Karl) Ludwig von Reichenbach (1788–1869)
- C.R.Carter – Charles R. Carter (fl. 1980s)
- C.Regel – Constantin Andreas von Regel (1890–1970)
- Crép. – François Crépin (1830–1903)
- Cretz. – Paul Cretzoiu (1909–1946)
- Cribb – Alan Cribb (1925–2026)
- Crins – William J. Crins (born 1955)
- C.Ríos – Carlos Ríos (fl. 2008)
- Crisci – Jorge Victor Crisci (born 1945)
- Crisp – Michael Douglas Crisp (born 1950)
- C.Rivière – Charles Marie Rivière (born 1845)
- C.R.Metcalfe – Charles Russell Metcalfe (1904–1991)
- Croat – Thomas Bernard Croat (born 1938)
- Croizat – Léon Camille Marius Croizat (1894–1982)
- Cron – Glynis V. Cron (fl. 1994)
- Cronk – Quentin Cronk (fl. 1980)
- Cronquist – Arthur John Cronquist (1919–1992)
- C.Rosenb. – Caroline Friderike Rosenberg (1810–1902)
- Crossl. – Charles Crossland (1844–1916)
- Crowden – R.K. Crowden (fl. 1986)
- C.R.P.Andrews – Cecil Rollo Payton Andrews (1870–1951)
- C.R.Parks – Clifford R. Parks (fl. 1963)
- Crueg. – Hermann Crüger (1818–1864)
- Crundw. – Alan Crundwell (1923–2000)
- Crusio – Wim Crusio (born 1954)
- C.R.Yeh – Chuan Rong Yeh (fl. 2008)
- C.Schultze – Christian Friedrich Schultze (1730–1755)
- C.S.Ding – Ding Suqin (fl. 1976)
- C.Shih – Chu Shih (1934–2005)
- C.Shull – Charles Albert Shull (1879–1962)
- C.Siebold – Karl (Carl) Theodor Ernst von Siebold (1804–1885)
- C.S.Kumar – C. Sathish Kumar (born 1957)
- C.S.Lee – Chang Shook Lee (fl. 1986)
- C.S.Leou – Chong Sheng Leou
- C.S.Li – Cheng Sen Li (born 1948)
- C.Sm. – Christen Smith (1785–1816)
- C.S.P.Foster – Charles S.P. Foster (fl. 2013)
- C.S.P.Parish – Charles Samuel Pollock Parish (1822–1897)
- C.Sprague – Charles James Sprague (1823–1903)
- C.Stuart – Charles Stuart (1802–1877)
- C.T.Gaudin – Charles-Théophile Gaudin (1822–1866)
- C.T.Lee – Chi Te Lee (fl. 2013)
- C.Tracy – Clarissa Tracy (1818–1905)
- C.Tul. – Charles Tulasne (1816–1884)
- C.T.White – Cyril Tenison White (1890–1950)

=== CU-CZ ===
- Cuatrec. – José Cuatrecasas (1903–1996)
- Cuénod – Auguste Jean Cuénod (1868–1954)
- Cuev.-Fig. – Xochitl Marisol Cuevas-Figueroa (fl. 2005)
- Cuff – Nicholas J. Cuff (born 1976)
- Cufod. – Georg Cufodontis (1896–1974)
- Culham – Alastair Culham (born 1965)
- Cullum – Thomas Gery Cullum (1741–1831)
- Culm. – Paul Frédéric Culmann (1860–1936)
- Cuming – Hugh Cuming (1791–1865)
- Cumm. – Clara Eaton Cummings (1855–1906)
- Cumming – William Archibald Cumming (1911–1999)
- Cummins – George Baker Cummins (1904–2007)
- Cupido – Christopher N. Cupido (born 1965)
- Curie – Peter Friedrich Curie (1777–1855)
- Curl – Herbert Charles Curl (born 1928)
- Curn. – William Curnow (1809–1887)
- Curr. – Frederick Currey (1819–1881)
- Currah – Randolph S. Currah (born 1954)
- Curran (also K.Brandegee) – Mary Katharine Curran (1844–1920)
- Currie – James Nimrod Currie (1883–1977)
- Curtis – William Curtis (1746–1799)
- Curto – Michael Leonard Curto (born 1956)
- Curzi – Mario Curzi (1898–1944)
- Cutak – Ladislaus Cutak (1908–1973)
- Cuvier – Georges Cuvier (1769–1832)
- C.Velásquez – César Velásquez (fl. 2009)
- C.V.Hartm. – Carl Vilhelm Hartman (1862–1941)
- C.V.Morton – Conrad Vernon Morton (1905–1972)
- C.Walcott – Charles Doolittle Walcott (1850–1927)
- C.Walter – Charles Walter (1831–1907)
- C.W.Andrews – Charles William Andrews (1866–1924)
- C.Weber – Claude Weber (fl. 1968)
- C.W.Emmons – Chester Wilson Emmons (1900–1985)
- C.Winkl. – Constantin (Konstantin) Georg Alexander Winkler (1848–1900)
- C.Winslow – Charles Frederick Winslow (1811–1877)
- C.W.Powell – Charles Wesley Powell (1854–1927)
- C.Wright – Charles Wright (1811–1885)
- C.W.Schneid. – Craig William Schneider (born 1948)
- C.W.Thomson – Charles Wyville Thomson (1830–1882)
- C.Y.Wang – Chang Yong Wang (born 1934)
- C.Y.Wu – Cheng Yih Wu (1916–2013)
- Czerep. – Sergei Kirillovich Czerepanov (1921–1995)
- Czern. – Vassilii Matveievitch Czernajew (1796–1871)
- Czerniak. – Ekaterina Georgiewna Czerniakowska (1892–1942)
- C.Z.Nelson – Carl Z. Nelson (1870–1939)
- C.Z.Tang – Chen (Zhen) Zi Tang (fl. 1982)

== D–Z ==
Contents: Top	A	B	C	D	E F	G	H	I J	K L	M	N O	P	Q R	S	T U V	W X Y Z

To find entries for D–Z, use the table of contents above.

== See also ==
- List of South African plant botanical authors
- List of botanists
- Category:Botanists
- List of Russian botanists
- List of zoologists by author abbreviation
