= Caflisch =

Caflisch is a Germanic surname. Notable people with the surname include:

- Jakob Friedrich Caflisch (1817–1882), German botanist
- Lucius Caflisch (born 1936), Swiss international law specialist
- Russel E. Caflisch (born 1954), American mathematician
