= Jacob Hübner =

German entomologist (1761–1826)

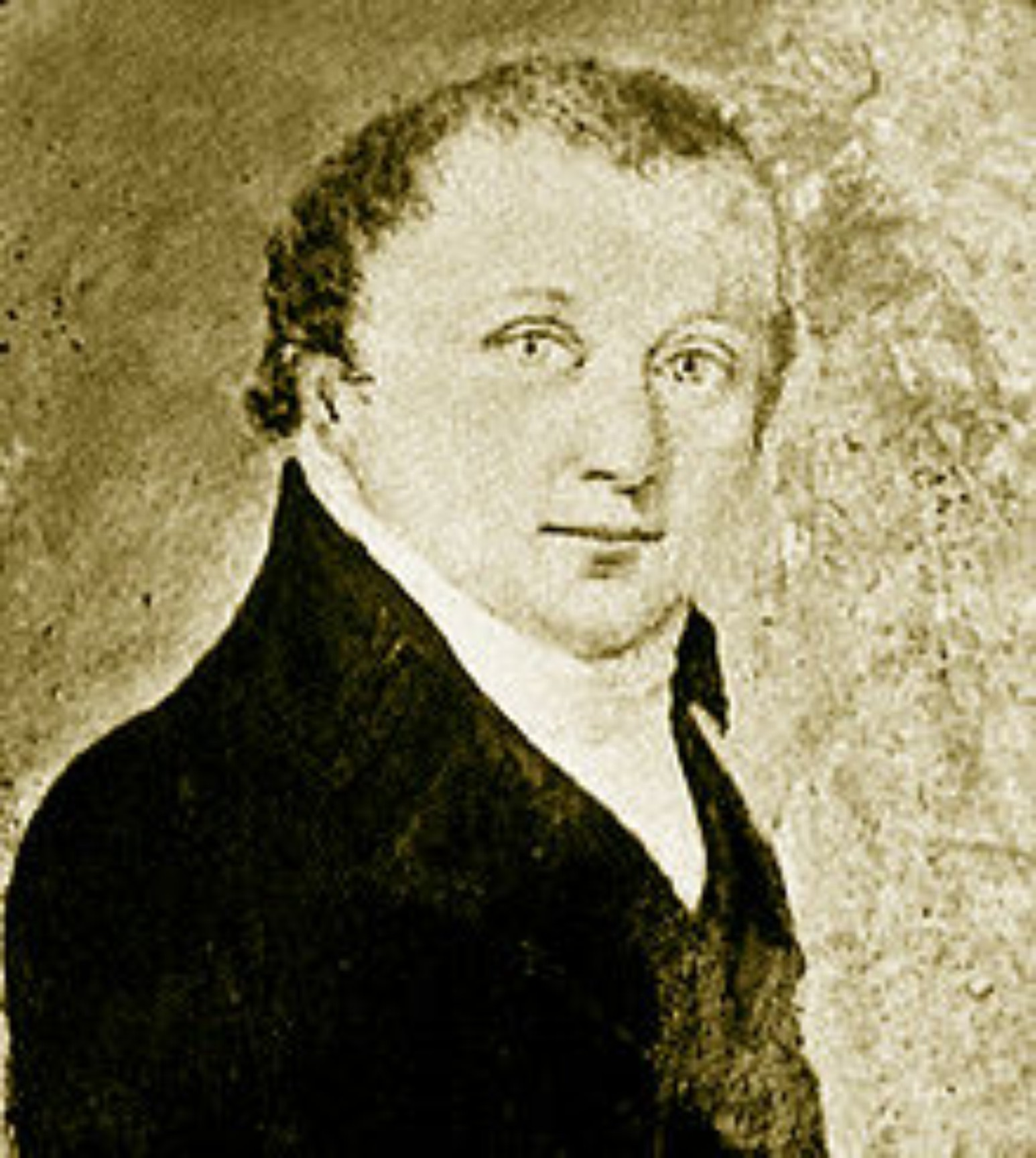
Jacob Hübner, c. 1790

Jacob Hübner (20 June 1761 – 13 September 1826, in Augsburg) was a German entomologist. He was the author of Sammlung Europäischer Schmetterlinge (1796–1805), a founding work of entomology.

== Scientific career ==
Hübner was the author of Sammlung Europäischer Schmetterlinge (1796–1805), a founding work of entomology. He was one of the first specialists to work on the European Lepidoptera. He described many new species, for example Sesia bembeciformis and Euchloe tagis, many of them common. He also described many new genera.

He was a designer and engraver and from 1786 he worked for three years as a designer and engraver at a cotton factory in Ukraine. There he collected butterflies and moths including descriptions and illustrations of some in Beiträge zur Geschichte der Schmetterlinge (1786–1790) along with other new species from the countryside around his home in Augsburg.

Hübner's masterwork "Tentamen" was intended as a discussion document. Inadvertently published, it led to subsequent confusion in classification. His publications were issued in sections, some after his death, often without associated publication dates. Arthur Francis Hemming, secretary of the International Commission on Zoological Nomenclature, summarized all the citations of Hübner's proposed taxonomic names, thereby constraining the possible dates of publication leading to the acceptance of Hübner's works as valid taxonomic publications.

== Works ==
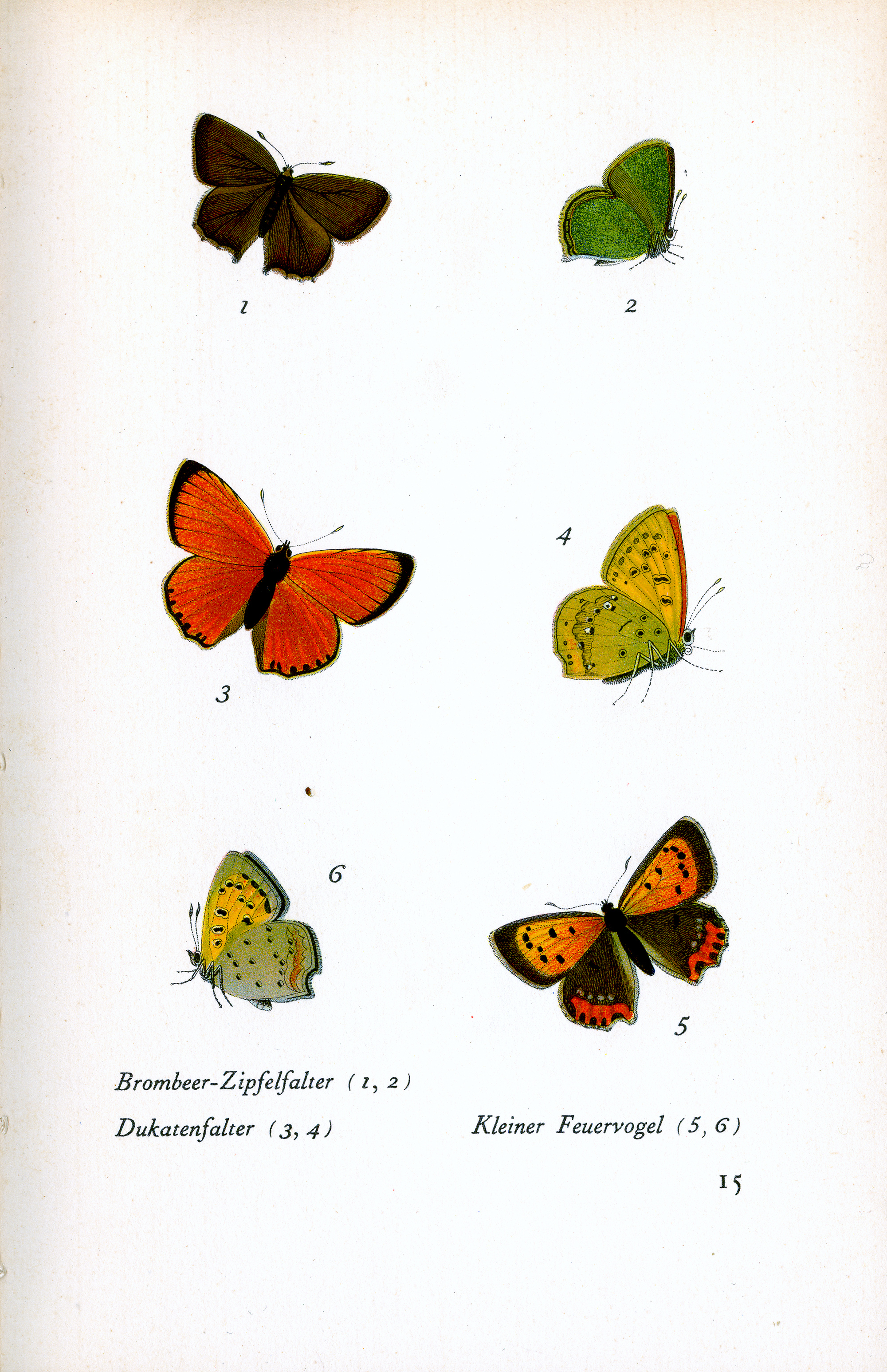
Plate from Hubner's Das kleine Schmetterlingsbuch showing green hairstreak, scarce copper and small copper

- 1786–1790: Beiträge zur Geschichte der Schmetterlinge ["Contributions to the history of butterflies"], Augsburg
- 1793: Sammlung auserlesener Vögel und Schmetterlinge, mit ihren Namen herausgegeben auf hundert nach der Natur ausgemalten Kupfern ["Collection of choice birds and butterflies, issued with included names on 100 naturally colored copperplate prints"]
- 1796–1805: Sammlung Europäischer Schmetterlinge ["Collection of European butterflies"]
- 1806: Tentamen determinationis, digestionis atque denominationis singularum singularum stirpium Lepidopterorum, peritis ad inspiciendum et dijudicandum communicatum ["Preliminary examination, an attempt to fix, arrange and name the individual races of Lepidoptera to experts for examination and the expression of an opinion"]
- 1806–1824: Geschichte europäischer Schmetterlinge ["History of European butterflies"]
- 1806–1834 (with C. Geyer and G.A.W. Herrich-Schäffer): Sammlung exotischer Schmetterlinge ["Collection of exotic butterflies"] (2 vols.), Augsburg
- 1816: Verzeichnis bekannter Schmetterlinge ["Directory of known butterflies"], Augsburg.
- 1822: Systematisch-alphabetisches Verzeichnis aller bisher bey den Fürbildungen zur Sammlung europäischer Schmetterlinge angegebenen Gattungsbenennungen ["Systematic-alphabetic directory of all genus names hitherto issued with the depictions of European butterflies"]. Augsburg: published by the author.

== Bibliography ==
- Pfeuffer, Eberhard; et al. (2003). Von der Natur fasziniert ... Frühe Augsburger Naturforscher und ihre Bilder. Augsburg: Wißner-Verlag. ISBN 978-3-89639-392-0. (Essays on Jacob Hübner, Gottlieb Tobias Wilhelm, Christian Friedrich Freyer, Johann Friedrich Leu, Jakob Friedrich Caflisch and Andreas Wiedemann)
- Calhoun, J. V. (2018). John Abbot, Jacob Hübner, and Oreas helicta (Nymphalidae: Satyridae). News of the Lepidopterists' Society. 60:159–163.
