= Yurii Sverba =

- Юрій Сверба

Deputy Head of the State Agency for Restoration and Infrastructure Development of Ukraine
- Incumbent
- Assumed office 25 October 2024

Personal details
- Born: Yurii Ivanovych Sverba; 24 March 1994 (age 32) Rokyta, Kovel Raion, Volyn Oblast, Ukraine
- Citizenship: Ukrainian
- Education: National University "Odesa Law Academy"; V. M. Koretsky Institute of State and Law
- Occupation: lawyer

Yurii Ivanovych Sverba (Ukrainian: Юрій Іванович Сверба; born 24 March 1994) is a Ukrainian lawyer who has served as Deputy Head of the State Agency for Restoration and Infrastructure Development of Ukraine since 25 October 2024. Prior to his appointment to the Restoration Agency, he worked at the Ministry of Justice of Ukraine and the National Agency on Corruption Prevention (NACP), where he headed the Department for Integrity Policy Development in the Public and Private Sectors from 2023 to 2024.

== Early life and education ==
Yurii Sverba was born on 24 March 1994 in the village of Rokyta, Kovel Raion, Volyn Oblast, Ukraine.

Until 2011, Sverba studied at the Volyn Regional Lyceum with Advanced Military and Physical Training. After graduating from the lyceum, he enrolled at the National University "Odesa Law Academy", where he studied at the Institute of Prosecution and Investigation from 2011 to 2015 and at the Institute of Criminal Justice from 2015 to 2017.

From 2018 to 2022, he studied at the V. M. Koretsky Institute of State and Law of the National Academy of Sciences of Ukraine.

== Professional career ==
=== Ministry of Justice ===
Sverba began his career in the public sector within Ukraine's free legal aid system. From 2016 to 2017, he headed the Starovyzhiv Legal Aid Bureau of the Kovel Local Centre for the Provision of Free Secondary Legal Aid.

In December 2017, Sverba joined the Ministry of Justice of Ukraine, where he worked as a state expert in the Expert Group on Access to Justice within the Directorate for Human Rights, Access to Justice and Legal Awareness. In 2020, he served as a state expert in the Expert Group on Legal Institutions Related to Justice within the Directorate of Justice and Criminal Justice.

=== National Agency on Corruption Prevention ===
In 2021, Sverba joined the National Agency on Corruption Prevention (NACP), initially serving as a chief specialist. From 2023 to 2024, he headed the Department for Integrity Policy Development in the Public and Private Sectors.

In this position, he worked on the development and implementation of integrity policies, corruption risk management, the activities of anti-corruption officers, and the development of anti-corruption compliance in public authorities and other organisations.

In 2023, Sverba presented the NACP-developed guide Посібник для керівника: побудова доброчесної та ефективної організації (Guide for Managers: Building an Organisation Based on Integrity and Effectiveness), which addressed the development of integrity systems, corruption risk management, anti-corruption programmes, and the independence of internal audit.

That year, Sverba also presented the results of a nationwide survey of anti-corruption officers. According to the NACP, the issues identified by the survey included safeguarding the independence of anti-corruption officers, remuneration, material and technical support, digitalisation of their work, and the role of institutional leadership in developing integrity policies.

In November 2023, together with NACP Deputy Head Yaroslav Liubchenko, Sverba presented at the Organisation for Economic Co-operation and Development (OECD) the results of Ukraine's efforts to develop its whistleblower protection framework.

In 2024, Sverba participated in work on the Integrity and Anti-Corruption Review of Ukraine, prepared in cooperation between the NACP and the OECD. The review covered areas including the integrity system, corruption risk management, conflicts of interest, whistleblower protection, and business integrity.

He was also one of the authors of the Model Code of Integrity for Legal Entities developed by the NACP in 2024.

=== State Agency for Restoration and Infrastructure Development ===
On 25 October 2024, Sverba was appointed Deputy Head of the State Agency for Restoration and Infrastructure Development of Ukraine by Order No. 1046-r of the Cabinet of Ministers of Ukraine.

At the agency, Sverba is responsible for the development of procurement, integrity, transparency, and accountability. The agency's public materials also describe him as its deputy head responsible for procurement.

As part of the area under his responsibility, the agency implemented a procurement risk management system that provides for automated analysis of procurement conducted by regional restoration services using defined risk indicators. According to the agency, the system is intended to identify risks at an early stage of procurement and improve the efficiency of the procurement process.

Sverba also worked on increasing the transparency of data concerning the cost of construction materials. The agency introduced a transparency dashboard for the construction of protective structures, which publishes data on the actual cost of major material resources purchased by contractors for the relevant projects.

According to the agency, in 2025 its regional restoration services announced 3,712 procurement procedures with a total estimated value exceeding ₴73 billion, including 682 open tenders with an estimated value of approximately ₴56 billion. The agency reported savings of approximately ₴2.8 billion as a result of the open tenders, with an average of 1.94 bidders per tender.

As part of his anti-corruption responsibilities, Sverba also participated in the implementation and updating of anti-corruption programmes for the agency and its regional restoration services.
