= Carex juniperorum =

Conservation status
- Vulnerable (NatureServe)

Scientific classification
- Kingdom: Plantae
- Clade: Embryophytes
- Clade: Tracheophytes
- Clade: Spermatophytes
- Clade: Angiosperms
- Clade: Monocots
- Clade: Commelinids
- Order: Poales
- Family: Cyperaceae
- Genus: Carex
- Species: C. juniperorum

Binomial name
- Carex juniperorum Catling, Reznicek & Crins 1993

Species of grass-like plant

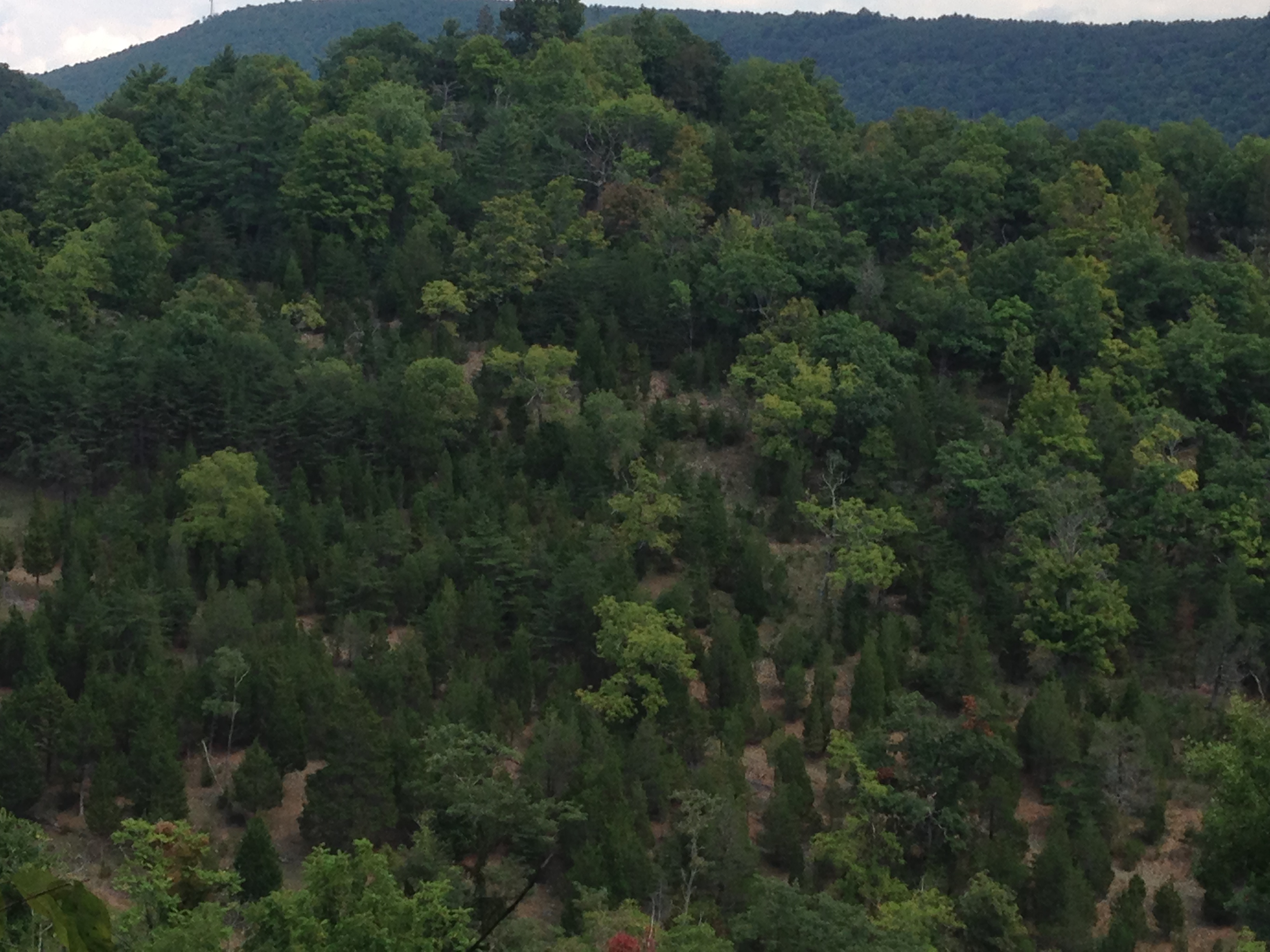
Cedar barren type environment in which C. juniperorum occurs.

Carex juniperorum, the juniper sedge, is a perennial flowering plant native to North America, first described by botanist William J. Crins in 1993. C. juniperorum is in the Cyperaceae (sedge) family, and is closely related to C. jamesii and C. willdenowii. It is commonly called juniper sedge as it is often seen growing in areas with red cedar (Juniperus virginiana), though the presence of cedar is not necessarily a requirement for it to grow.

== Distribution ==
Juniper sedge is globally rare. It only occurs in sections of Ohio, Kentucky, and Virginia in the United States. In Canada, it is found in the province of Ontario.

== Description and habitat ==
Juniper sedge prefers dry, open, calcareous soils that are periodically disturbed to maintain canopy cover. The plant grows forming a clump, with grass-like leaves up to 30cm long with a reddish-brown basal sheath. Flowers occur in early may on a small basal spike. Small (1.5-2mm) ellipsoid perigynia form in late May lasting until late June.

== Risks ==
Cyperus juniperorum faces habitat risk from fire suppression, invasive plant succession, development and habitat fragmentation. the sedge requires open habitat to grow and through fire suppression, land use changes, and increased invasive plant presence such as Ailanthus altissima have threatened existing populations. To ensure the survival of the species proper land management techniques must be implemented to keep existing habitat clear of secondary growth that may outcompete juniper sedge.
