= Elachista cucullata =

Scientific classification
- Domain: Eukaryota
- Kingdom: Animalia
- Phylum: Arthropoda
- Class: Insecta
- Order: Lepidoptera
- Family: Elachistidae
- Genus: Elachista
- Species: E. cucullata

Binomial name
- Elachista cucullata Braun, 1921

Synonyms
- Biselachista cucullata

Species of moth

Elachista cucullata is a moth of the family Elachistidae. It is found in North America, where it has been recorded from California, Florida, Indiana, Maine, Massachusetts, Mississippi, New Jersey, New Mexico, Ohio, Ontario, Pennsylvania, Quebec and West Virginia.

The wingspan is 8–9 mm. Adults have been recorded on wing from May to July.

The larvae feed on various Carex species, including Carex jamesii. They mine the stem leaves of their host plant.
