= National University Odesa Law Academy =

Public university in Odesa, Ukraine

National University "Odesa Law Academy"
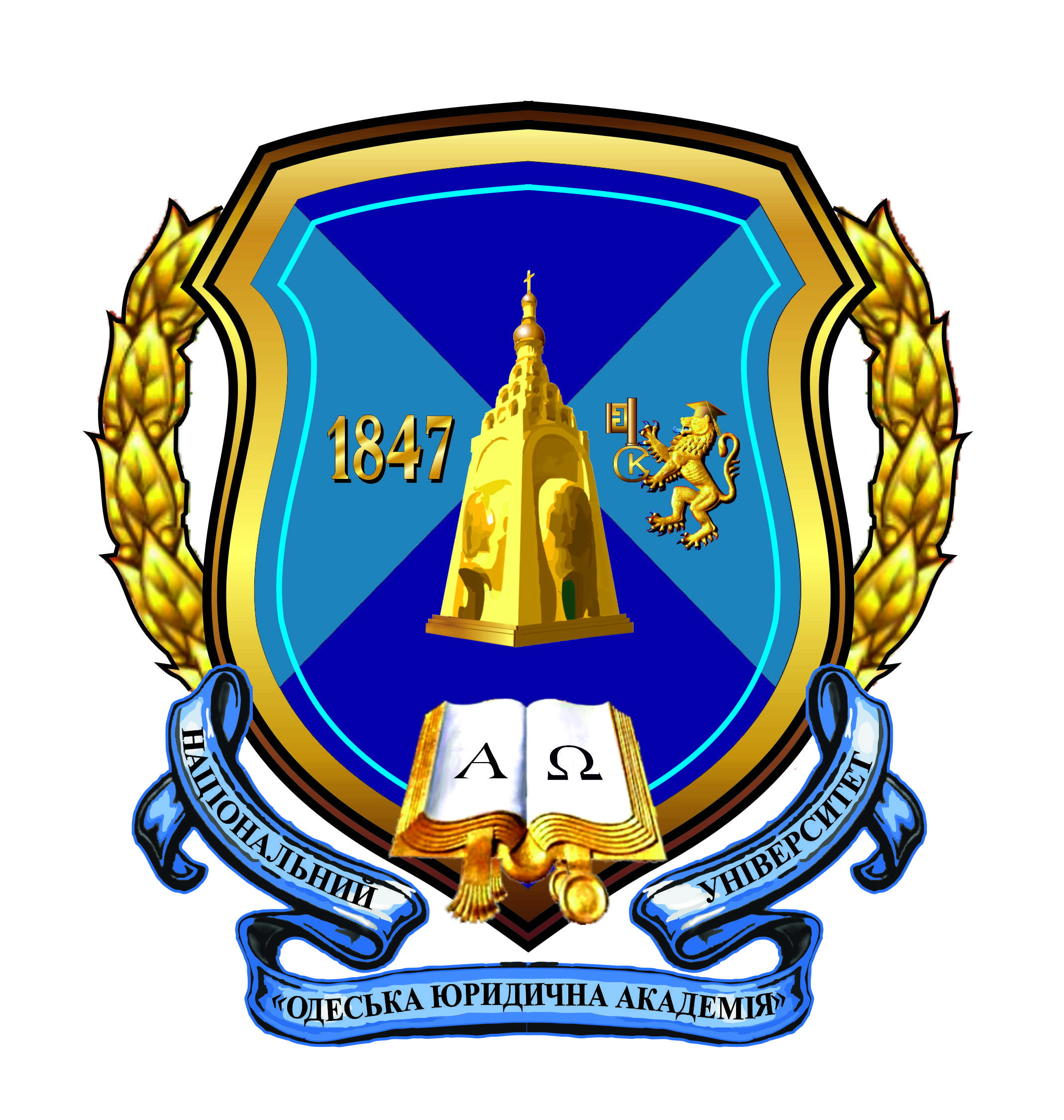
- Other name: NU "OLA"
- Former name: see §
- Type: Public
- Active: 2 December 1997–February 2025
- Affiliations: Odesa University (since 2025), Ministry of Education and Science of Ukraine
- Academic affiliations: EUA
- President: Serhii Kivalov
- Students: 17,000
- Location: Odesa, Ukraine
- Campus: Urban
- Website: onua.edu.ua

The National University "Odesa Law Academy" (Ukrainian: Національний університет «Одеська юридична академія», romanized: Natsionalnyi universytet "Odeska yurydychna akademiia") is a higher educational institution in Odesa, Ukraine. The university was founded in 1997 on the basis of Law Institute of Odesa I.I. Mechnikov National University. Today NU "OLA" is the center of legal education, culture, and science of Ukraine, leading higher educational institution of jurisprudence. According to the State Accreditation Commission of Ministry of Education and Science, Youth and Sports of Ukraine, the university trains specialists in the highest - IV - level of accreditation. Since February 2025, part of Odesa National University.

== History in brief ==
- 1847 – Law Faculty of Richelieu Lyceum (first higher education institution in Odesa) obtained the status of University Faculty;
- 1865 – Law Faculty became a part of Novorossiysk (now – Odesa) University;
- 1993 – Law Faculty was reorganized into Law Institute of Odesa I.I. Mechnikov State University;
- 1997 – Odesa State Law Academy was created;
- 1998 – Odesa State Law Academy became a member of European University Association;
- 2000 – Odesa State Law Academy obtained the status of National;
- 2004 – Odesa National Law Academy signed Magna Charta Universitatum in Bologna (Italy);
- 2007 – Odesa National Law Academy celebrated its 10th anniversary;
- 2008 – Odesa National Law Academy became a member of European Public Law Organization and received European Quality Award according to the Decision of European Council of Rectors;
- 2010 – Odesa National Law Academy was recognized as the best legal higher educational institution of Ukraine according to St. Volodymyr rating; on the base of Odesa National Law Academy the South Regional Centre of National Academy of Legal Sciences of Ukraine was created;
- 2010 – Odesa National Law Academy was reorganized into National University «Odesa Law Academy»;
- 2012 – National University «Odesa Law Academy» celebrated its 15th anniversary, and legal science and education in the South of Ukraine celebrated its 165-year anniversary.

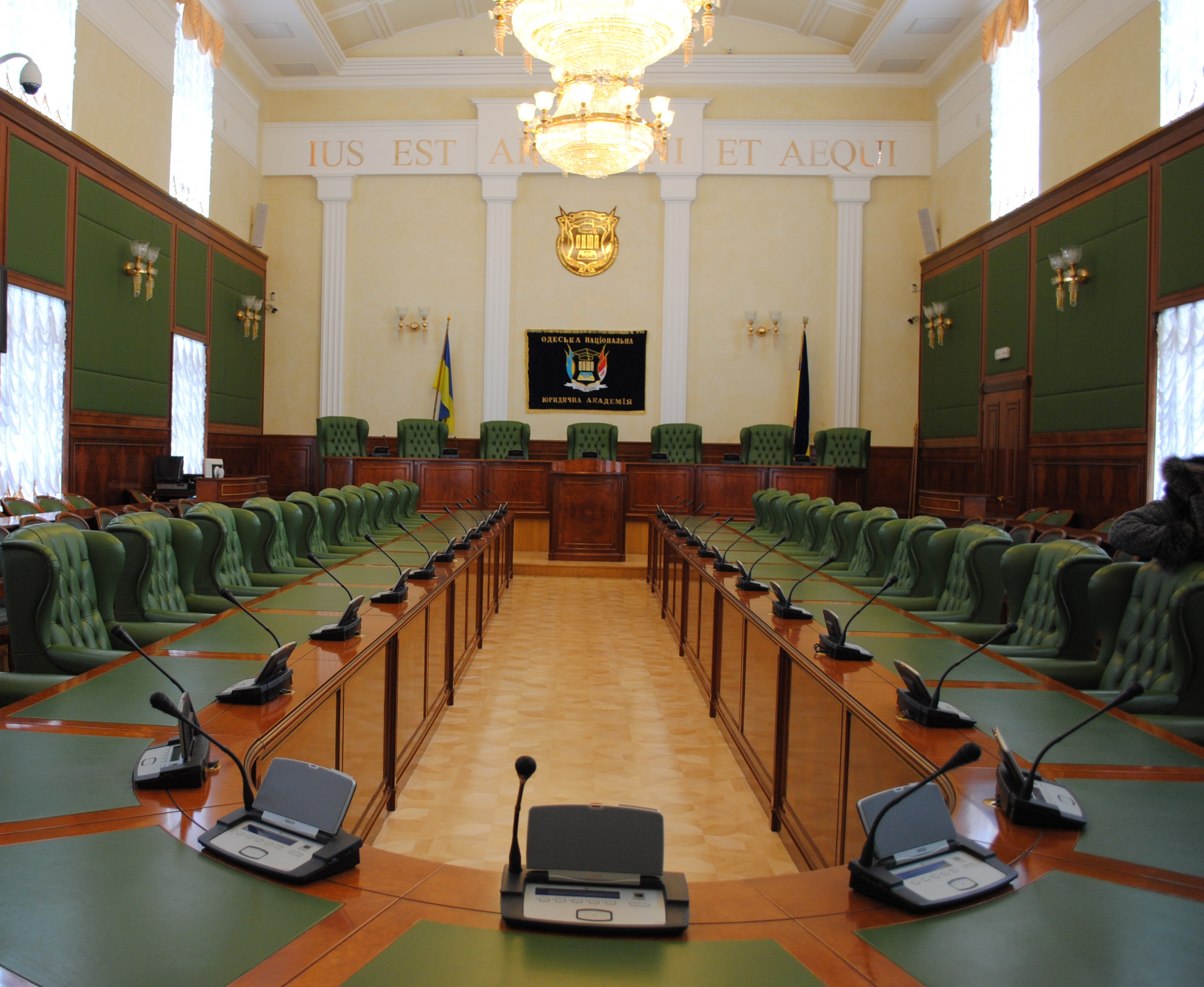
Сonference Hall of Scientific Council

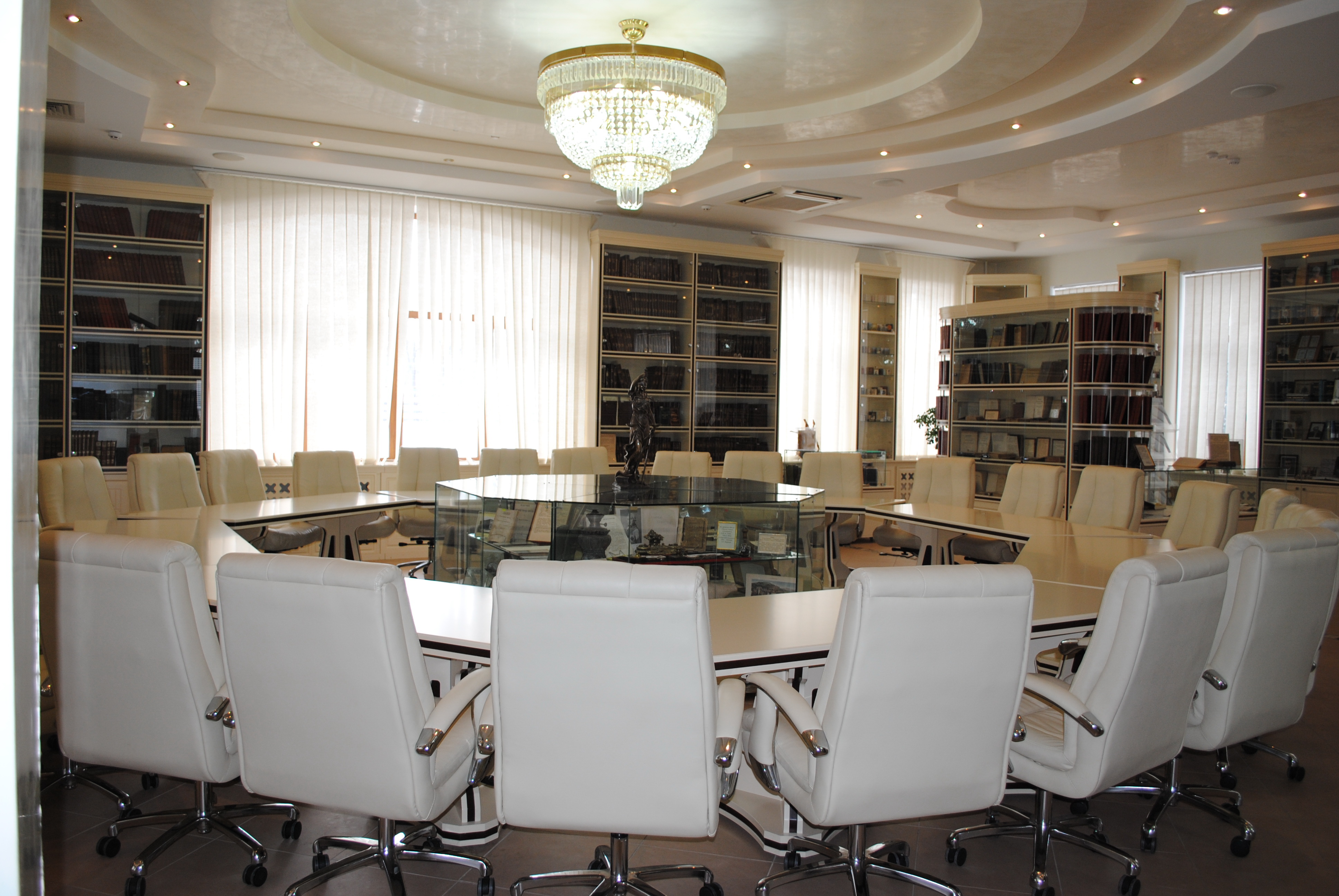
Museum of Rare Books

== Campus ==
Campus of the university in Odesa is a complex of modern buildings with a total area of over 73,000 m2, located on the Pionerska street, 2, 5, 7, 8, 9; Fontanskaya Doroga, 23, 33, 71, Klenova, 8, Cherniakhovskogo 2, Topoleva, 8a, 10a, Mechnikova, 76, Staroportofrankovskaya, 93, L. Tolstoho, 24, Uspenska, 28–30, Rishelyevska, 28; Kirpichny lane., 25. Providing classroom fund at the university is about 15 square meters per student. On Pionerska street, 2 there is a main ten-academic building with area 11,786 m2, where classrooms and offices of training subdivisions, laboratories, dining room for 220 meters, special classroom to simulate trial, computer classrooms, a library with a reading room with more than 400 seats, museum of rare books, museum of weapons, shooting ranges, assembly hall for 600 meter and sports halls are located. Nearby there is a multifunctional sports complex in the open air.

== Institutes and faculties ==
Institute of Prosecution and Investigation prepares specialists in law (specialties: prosecution activities, investigation activities) for work in prosecution offices and pre-trial investigation offices, in other law enforcement agencies (Ministry of Interior Affairs, Security Service of Ukraine, State Tax Police, judicial authorities) to work as: prosecutor assistants, investigators, experts-criminologists, military lawyers. During their study students have training in law enforcement authorities; they also study at the Department of Military Training.

Faculty of Civil and Economic Justice prepares specialists in law with emphasis on: Civil law, Civil procedure, Economic law, Economic procedure, legal support of bankruptcy, legal support of foreign economic activities, legal regulation of land ownership relations, and executive procedures allowing to work in justice authorities (including State Executive Service), judicial authorities, tax authorities, departments of land resources, notary offices, and advocacy.

Faculty of Judicial and Administrative Law prepares specialists in law (specialties: judicial activity, management, legal support of maritime and customs activities) with emphasis on: Constitutional law, Administrative law, Customs law, Maritime law, so the graduates receive the qualification to work in court authorities, State Court administration, central and local executive authorities, local government, state control agencies, customs authorities, law services in area of maritime and river transport management, state authorities and public associations; executive services of local governments, employment services, special inspections, consulting management services, services on legal support of business, prosecution office, administrative services of law enforcement authorities.

Faculty of International Legal Relations prepares specialists in the field of law (specialty: international legal relations) with emphasis on International law, European Union law, Comparative law. Graduates of specialty “International Legal Relations” can obtain posts in local and central authorities, local government, state control, diplomatic missions and consular offices, special inspections, legal services on foreign economic relations and others.

Faculty of Social Law preparers specialists in law with an emphasis on Law of social security, Labour law, Medical law, so the graduates obtain necessary qualification for work in Pension Fund of Ukraine, State Employment service, labor authorities, and social security organizations.

Faculty of Advocacy prepares specialists in law, whose specialty is advocacy. Faculty graduates gain knowledge and skills in legal, economic, organizational, social-political and humanitarian aspects, which is necessary for work in law firms and legal consulting firms to protect rights and represent interests of persons and entities.

Faculty of Correspondence and Evening Study prepares specialists in law (specialties: state governance and international legal relations; civil law, prosecution and investigation, social law, maritime and customs law). Using interactive technologies and methods in education process provides training of high-qualified specialists without interruption from their main place of employment. Faculty graduates gain knowledge and skills necessary for work in local executive authorities, local government, law-enforcement agencies, courts, legal services of entities. Correspondence and evening study take 6 and 7 years respectively.

Faculty of Correspondence #2 gives an opportunity to obtain a second university degree in law to people who already have a degree in other specialties. Duration of study is 3 years.

Faculty of Legal Political Science and Sociology prepares specialists in “political science” and “sociology” to work in government authorities, local government, social and political institutes, parties, funds, political and social centers, laboratories, and mass media.

Institute of Professional Judges Training on the base of previously gained higher legal education prepares lawyers-professionals with qualification level “Master of Law” (specialties: “judge of a general court”, “judge of a special court”). The full-time study takes 1 year, correspondence study - 2 years. Students of the Institute acquire theoretical knowledge and special skills which are important for professional judges in Ukraine. Lectures, workshops are conducted by professors of the university; by judges of higher specialized courts, Supreme Court, local courts and Courts of Appeal; by main specialists of Supreme Council of Justice.

Institute of Intellectual Property on the base of previously gained higher education prepares Masters in specialties: “intellectual property”, “consolidated information”, “management of innovation activity”. Also, the Institute trains students according to specialty “law”. Institute is a leading specialized higher education institution in the area of intellectual property, informational and analytical, innovation activity. Lectures, workshops and practice training are conducted by lecturers of the university, specialists of State system of legal protection of intellectual property, National Academy of Sciences of Ukraine, Cabinet of Ministers of Ukraine, Ministry of Education and Science, Youth and Sports of Ukraine.

Magistracy of Public Service on the base of previously gained higher education prepares Masters in specialty “public service” (specializations “legal provision” and “economic protection”). Training is conducted according to the educational and professional program and study plans confirmed by the Department of State Service of Ukraine, so the graduates obtain the qualification necessary for work in government authorities and local government.

Law College prepares students in specialty Law, they obtain the level of junior specialist. Citizens of Ukraine with basic and full secondary education can be admitted to the Law College. The full-time study lasts 3 years and a part-time study – 4 years.

Preparatory Department provides training of people who study in the last grades of high school, gymnasiums, lyceums and of those who have complete high school degree in order to get admitted to the university.

Doctorate and Post-graduate Studies are the main forms of training for scientists. There are specialized Scientific Councils for Ph.D. and JD degrees in all legal specialties, and also for Ph.D. and Doctor of Political Sciences in the university.

== Doctors Honoris Causa ==
1. Vitaliy Boiko – President of the Supreme Court of Ukraine (1995–2002);
2. Ivan Dombrowski – President of the Constitutional Court of Ukraine (2006–2007);
3. Alistair Alcock – Vice-Rector of University of Buckingham (UK) (2003–2005);
4. Lucius Caflisch – Judge of the European Court of Human Rights (1998–2006);
5. Philippe Kirsch – President of the International Criminal Court (2003–2009);
6. Leonid Kuchma – President of Ukraine (1994–2005);
7. Vasyl Malyarenko – Chairman of the Supreme Court (2002–2006);
8. Metropolitan of Odesa and Izmail Agafangel;
9. Mykhailo Potebenko – Prosecutor General of Ukraine (1998–2002);
10. Dmytro Prytyka – Chairman of the Supreme Arbitration Court of Ukraine (1991–2006);
11. Mevlüt Çavuşoğlu – President of the Parliamentary Assembly of Council of Europe (2010–2012).

== Awards and reputation ==
- Since 1998 the university is a member of European University Association
- In 2002 the university signed Magna Charta Universitatum.
- Since 2008 the university is a member of the European Public Law.
- In 2008 Council of Rectors of Europe has awarded the university award for "European Quality".
- In 2011 the university was awarded the silver medal in the category "International cooperation in the field of education" in the XX International specialized exhibition "Education and Career − 2011".
- By rating of Ukrainian magazine "Focus" University in 2011 won the first place in the area of international cooperation among Ukrainian universities that prepare lawyers.
- In 2012 the university was awarded in the category "Leaders of the international activities" within the III International exhibition "Modern education − 2012".

== See also ==
List of universities in Ukraine
