= William J. Crins =

William "Bill" J. Crins (born 1955) is a botanist, naturalist, and ecologist.

After graduating from M. M. Robinson High School in Burlington, Ontario, Crins matriculated in 1974 at the University of Guelph, where he graduated in 1978 with a B.Sc. in botany. During the summers of the years 1972–1978 he worked at Algonquin Provincial Park as an interpretive naturalist. In 1985 he graduated from the University of Toronto with a Ph.D. in systematic botany. After receiving his Ph.D., he did research at the University of British Columbia, where he worked on tarweed evolution with Bruce Arthur Bohm. Crins then worked on plant systematics at the New York State Museum. He was from 1998 to 2011 a Senior Conservation Ecologist in the Ontario Ministry of Natural Resources (OMNR) in Peterborough and from 2011 to 2016 a Senior Program Coordinator, Resource Conservation in the OMNR, Parks & Protected Areas Policy Section From January 2017 to the present, he has been employed by the University of Toronto Scarborough as a lecturer, teaching a graduate course on population ecology, community ecology, and management of protected areas.

In August 1989 Crins gave an address to the Canadian Botanical Association/Association botanique du Canada (CBA/ABC). As a naturalist, he has outstanding expertise in grasses, sedges, wildflowers, and birds. He also has expertise in entomology, especially flower flies. He was the first to scientifically describe the species Carex juniperorum.

== Selected publications ==
- Crins, William J.; Bohm, Bruce A.; Carr, Gerald D. (1988). "Flavonoids as Indicators of Hybridization in a Mixed Population of Lava-colonizing Hawaiian Tarweeds (Asteraceae: Heliantheae: Madiinae)". Systematic Botany. 13 (4): 567–571. doi:10.2307/2419202. JSTOR 2419202.
- Crins, William J. (1989). "The Tamaricaceae in the Southeastern United States". Journal of the Arnold Arboretum. 70 (3): 403–425. doi:10.5962/bhl.part.19790. JSTOR 43782590.
- Crins, William J. (1991). "The Genera of Paniceae (Gramineae: Panicoideae) in the Southeastern United States". Journal of the Arnold Arboretum. Supplementary Series. 1: 171–312. doi:10.5962/p.315944. JSTOR 43782785.
- Catling, Paul M.; Reznicek, Anton A.; Crins, William J. (1993). "Carex juniperorum (Cyperaceae), a New Species from Northeastern North America, with a Key to Carex sect. Phyllostachys". Systematic Botany. 18 (3): 496–501. doi:10.2307/2419421. JSTOR 2419421.
- Leblond, R. J.; Weakley, A. S.; Reznicek, A. A.; Crins, W. J. (1994). "Carex lutea (Cyperaceae), A Rare New Coastal Plain Endemic from North Carolina". SIDA, Contributions to Botany. 16 (1): 153–161. JSTOR 41967090.
- Crins, William J. (2004). "Ontario bird records committee report for 2003" (PDF). Ontario Birds. 22 (2): 54–74.
- McKenney, D. W.; Pedlar, J. H.; Lawrence, K.; Gray, P. A.; Colombo, S. J.; Crins, W. J. (2010). Current and projected future climatic conditions for ecoregions and selected natural heritage areas in Ontario (No. CCRR-16). Ontario Forest Research Institute.
- Proctor, Eleanor; Nol, Erica; Burke, Dawn; Crins, William J. (2012). "Responses of insect pollinators and understory plants to silviculture in northern hardwood forests". Biodiversity and Conservation. 21 (7): 1703–1740. doi:10.1007/s10531-012-0272-8. S2CID 16054086.
