= Caroline Rosenberg =

Danish botanist (1810–1902)

Caroline Friderike Rosenberg (1810–1902) was a Danish botanist. Although she was self taught, she became well known during her time for her published botanical research, especially into Norwegian algae.

== Life and work ==
Caroline Rosenberg was born 24 September 1810, in Holsten in 1810, the daughter of a landscape artist. She and her two sisters lost their mother when Caroline was 11, so their father hired a governess who remained with the family until 1830. The governess then found employment in the home of the agricultural economist and botanist Niels Hofman Bang at Hofmansgave, Denmark. After Caroline's father's death in 1833, she went to Odense, near Hofmansgave, as a live-in tutor for one of Hofman Bang's cousins.

After only a few years, Rosenberg became very ill with a severe bout of pneumonia. The Hofman Bang family cared for her and later took her into their family as a foster daughter.

Rosenberg was a self taught botanist and spent the remainder of her life at Hofmansgave learning from her foster family and visiting botanists. She went on to identify dozens of plants.

== Later years ==
She was highly respected and in 1866, she was named an honorary member of the Danish Botanical Association.

At the age of 87, a species of moss was named for her: Bryum Rosenbergiae.

Rosenberg died 11 February 1902 in Hofmansgave.

The standard author abbreviation C.Rosenb. is used to indicate this person as the author when citing a botanical name.
