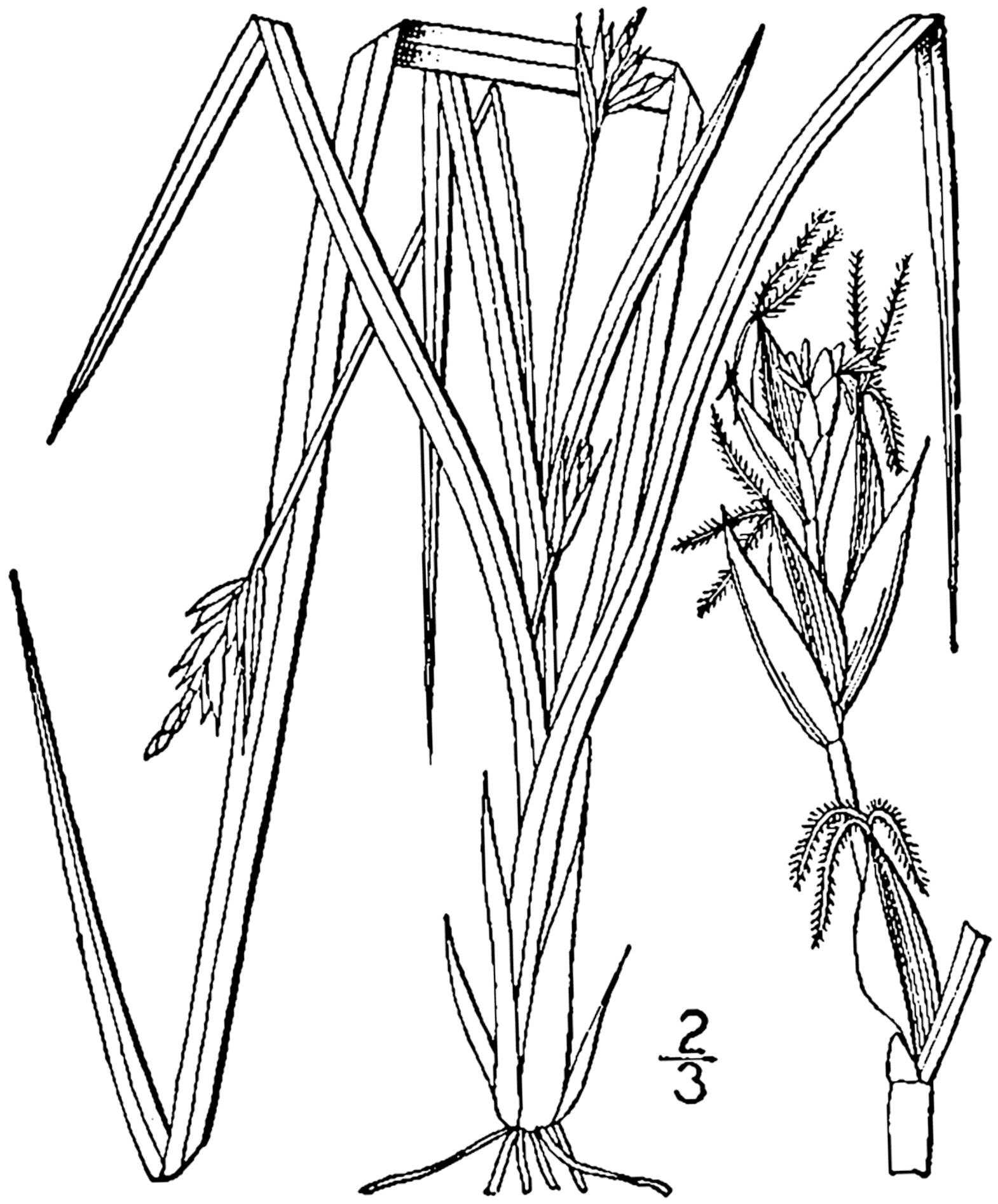

Conservation status
- Secure (NatureServe)

Scientific classification
- Kingdom: Plantae
- Clade: Tracheophytes
- Clade: Angiosperms
- Clade: Monocots
- Clade: Commelinids
- Order: Poales
- Family: Cyperaceae
- Genus: Carex
- Species: C. willdenowii

Binomial name
- Carex willdenowii Schkuhr ex Willd.

= Carex willdenowii =

Species of grass-like plant

Carex willdenowii, common name Willdenow's sedge, is a species of Carex native to North America.

== Conservation status ==
It is listed as endangered in Connecticut It is also listed as threatened in Illinois and New York (state).
