= Auguste Cuénod =

Swiss ophthalmologist

Auguste Cuénod (15 June 1868, in Saint-Legier-sur-Vevey – 8 February 1954, in Hammamet) was a Swiss ophthalmologist, known for his work in the fight against trachoma.

He studied medicine in Lausanne and Paris, receiving his doctorate in 1894. Afterwards, he relocated to Tunis, where he subsequently established an eye clinic. In Tunis, he worked closely with Charles Nicolle at the Pasteur Institute.

In 1923, with Nicolle and Victor Morax, he founded the Ligue internationale contre le trachome (International League against Trachoma). He was also a founding member and president of the Société tunisienne des sciences médicales (Tunisian Society of Medical Sciences).

== Published works ==
In 1900, with Albert Terson, he published Atlas-manuel d'ophtalmoscopie ("Atlas and manual of ophthalmoscopy"), a French edition of Otto Haab's Atlas und Grundriss der Ophthalmoskopie und ophthalmoskopischen Diagnostik. His other works in ophthalmology include:

- Bactériologie et parasitologie cliniques des paupières, 1894 – Clinical bacteriology and parasitology of the eyelids.
- Le trachome; historique, clinique, recherches expérimentales et étiologie, thérapeutique, prophylaxie (with Roger Nataf, 1930) – Trachoma, historical, clinical, experimental research and etiology, treatment, prophylaxis.
- Biomicroscopie de la conjonctive (with Roger Nataf, 1934) – Biomicroscopy of the conjunctiva.

In the field of botany he published a book on Tunisian flora, titled Flore analytique et synoptique de la Tunisie (1954).
