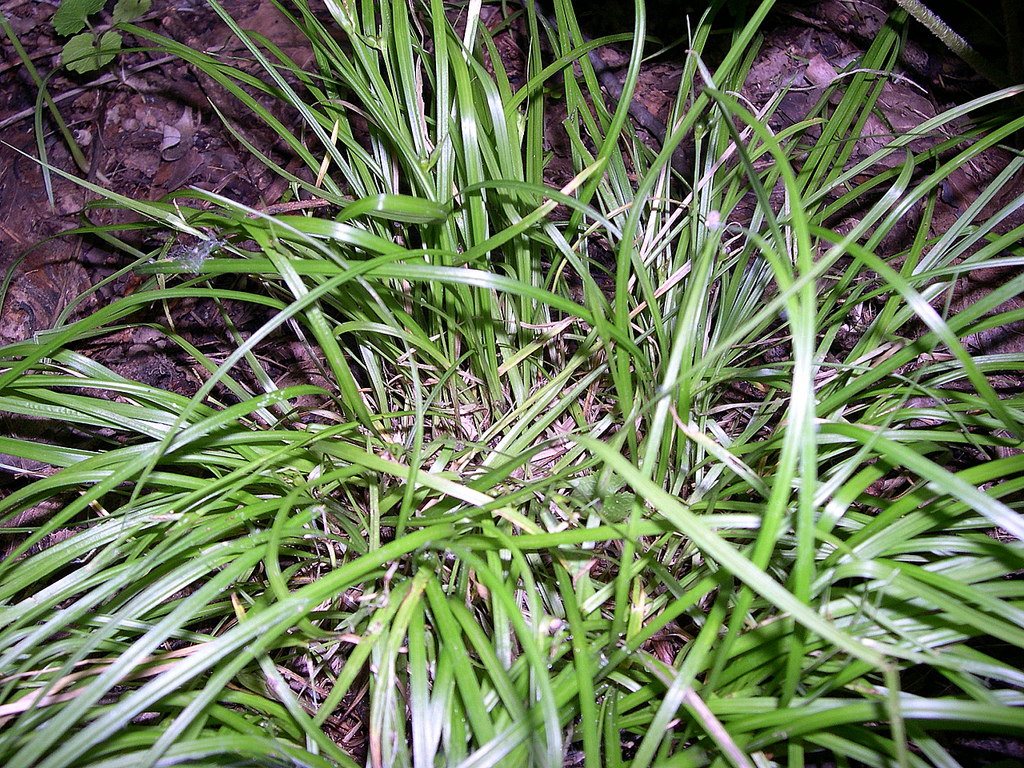

Scientific classification
- Kingdom: Plantae
- Clade: Tracheophytes
- Clade: Angiosperms
- Clade: Monocots
- Clade: Commelinids
- Order: Poales
- Family: Cyperaceae
- Genus: Carex
- Subgenus: Carex subg. Carex
- Section: Carex sect. Phyllostachyae
- Species: C. jamesii

Binomial name
- Carex jamesii Schwein.

= Carex jamesii =

Species of grass-like plant

Carex jamesii, known as James's sedge or grass sedge, is a species of sedge native to North America from Minnesota east to New York and south to Oklahoma and South Carolina. It occurs in mesic hardwood forests and produces fruits from early May to mid July. It has two to four perigynia that are subtended by leaf-like pistillate scales. Its seeds are dispersed by ants.

Within the genus Carex, Carex jamesii is in the section Phyllostachyae (sometimes Phyllostachys) and is most closely related to C. juniperorum.

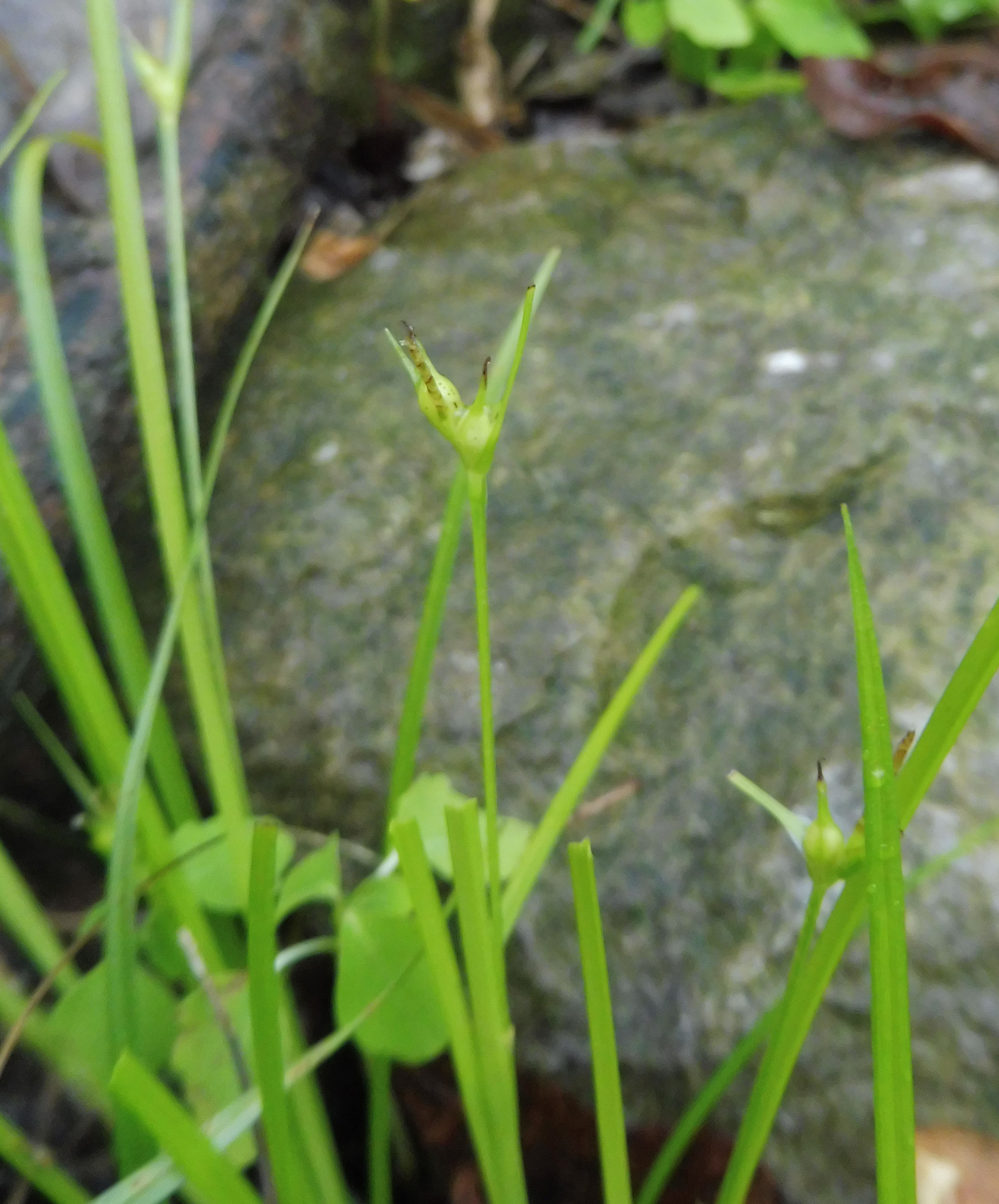
Detail of fruiting spike
