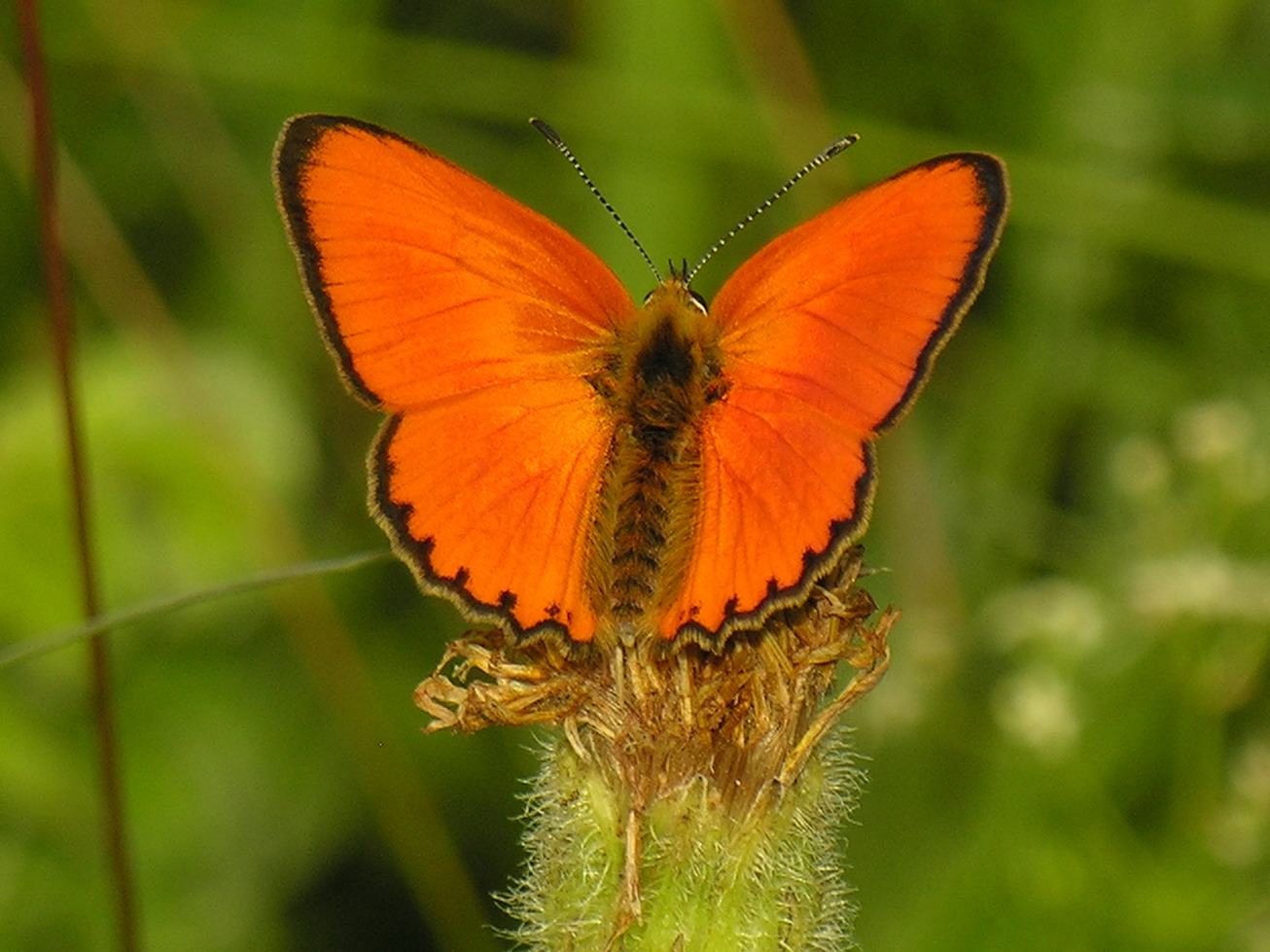
- Male
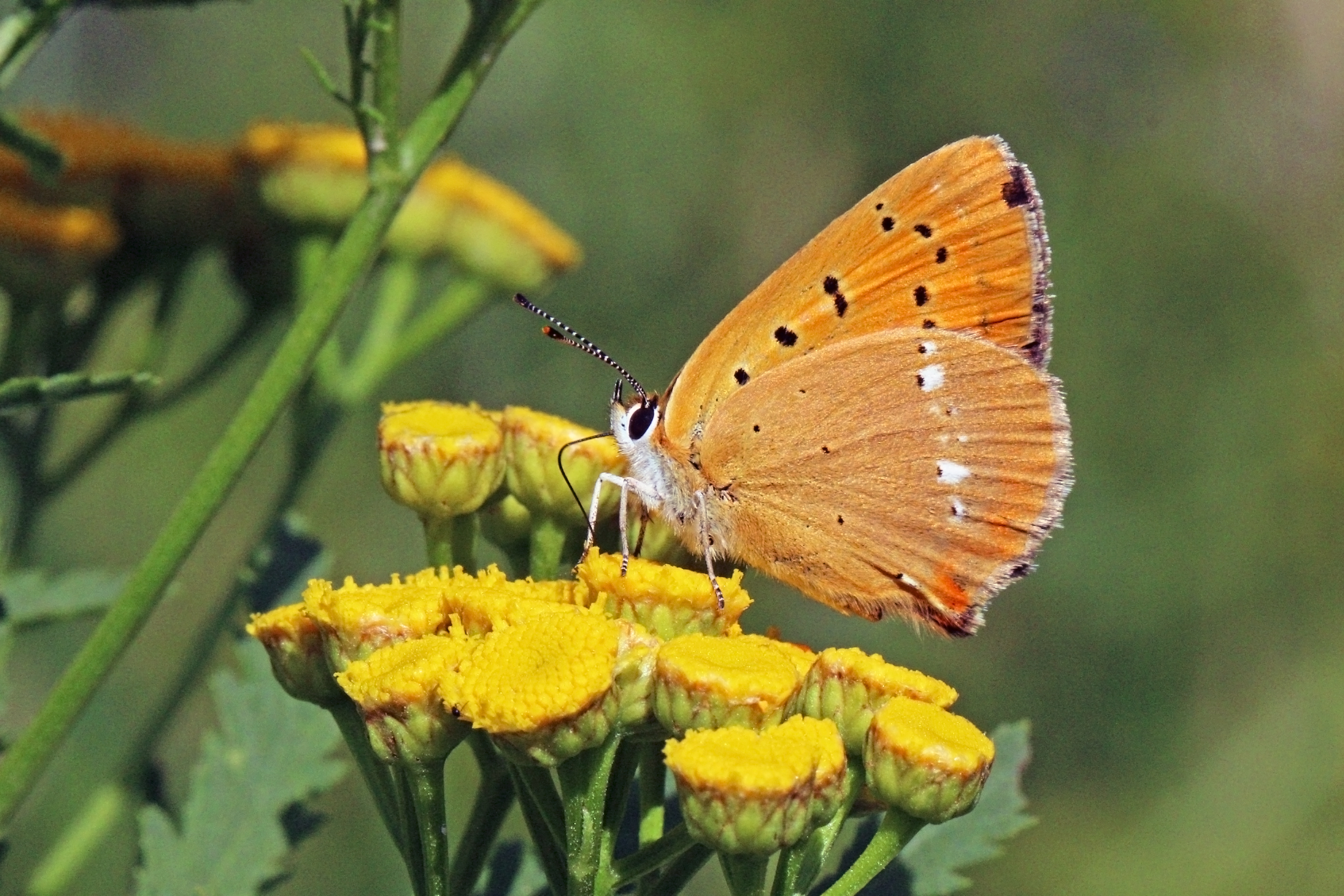
- Female in Bulgaria

Scientific classification
- Kingdom: Animalia
- Phylum: Arthropoda
- Class: Insecta
- Order: Lepidoptera
- Family: Lycaenidae
- Genus: Lycaena
- Species: L. virgaureae

Binomial name
- Lycaena virgaureae (Linnaeus, 1758)

Synonyms
- Heodes virgaureae

= Scarce copper =

Species of butterfly

The scarce copper (Lycaena virgaureae) is a butterfly of the family Lycaenidae (copper or gossamer-winged butterflies).

== Appearance ==
The lower surfaces of the back wings are yellowish and have only a few black dots; there are characteristic white marks in the immediate vicinity of these. The species exhibits one kind of sexual dimorphism: male butterflies are colored bright gold-red on the upper side of wing, while the females have broader orange wings with a dark design.

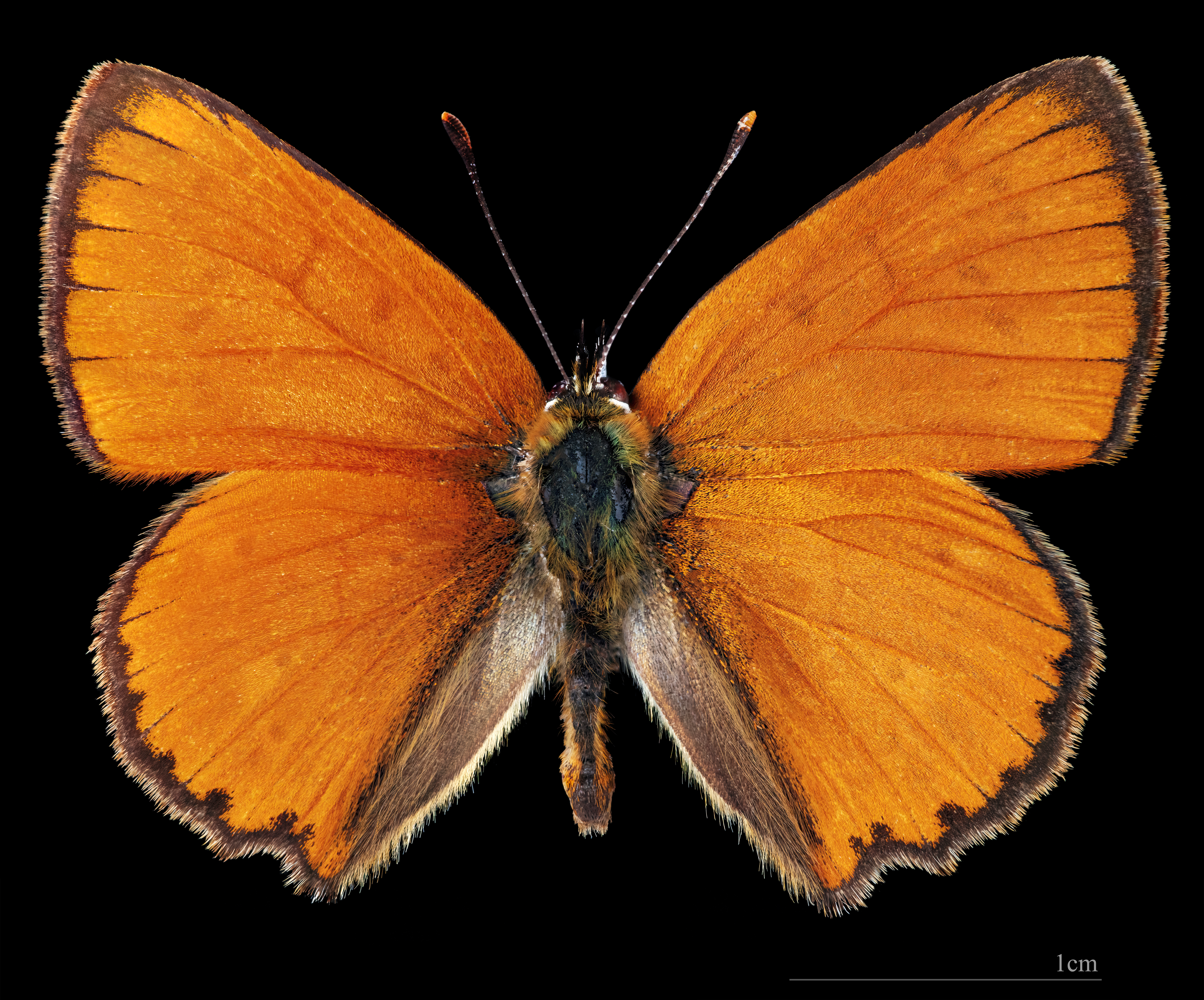
Lycaena virgaureae ♂

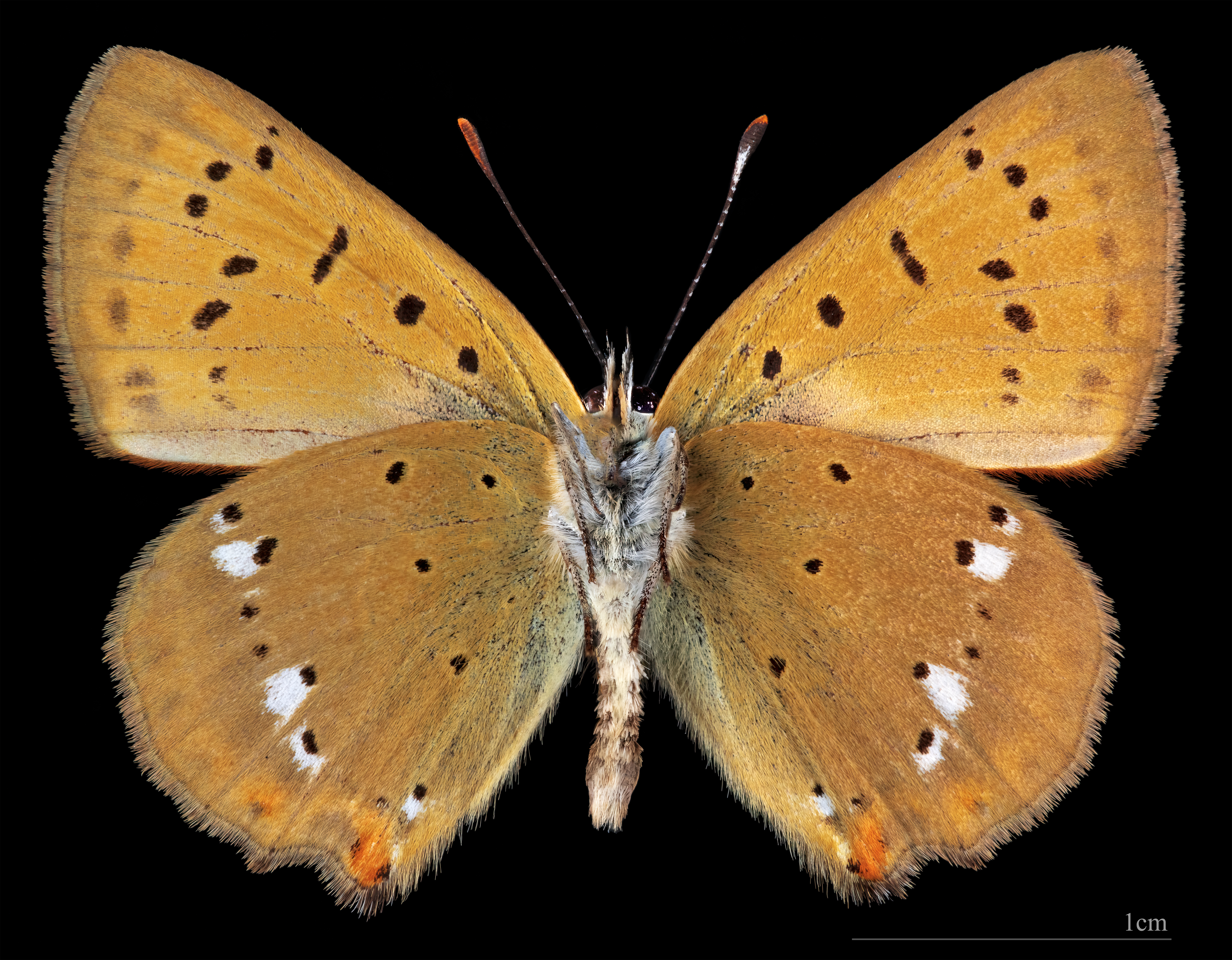
Lycaena virgaureae ♂ △

== Life cycle ==
A generation appears from mid-July to mid-September.

Eggs are laid on dried-out plant parts, for example on dry sorrel stems. The eggs are white in color and somewhat larger than those of other Lycaena species. The caterpillars are green and nocturnal and eat sorrel. Lycaena virgaureae is the only species of this genus whose eggs last over the winter. The butterflies feed on blossoms of such plants as the ground-elder, Eupatorium, Valeriana, and burnet saxifrage.

== Habitat ==
Lycaena virgaureae lives preferably on flower-rich, dry and damp meadows in Central Europe. In Spain it is found in the Pyrenees and in the Cantabrian Mountains. In southern France it is found in the Massif Central. Its area of distribution reaches the Arctic Circle in Fennoscandia in the north; in the south it reaches north and northwest Greece. In Belgium there are a few threatened populations in the south of the country. It is not found, however, on the British Isles or the Netherlands. It can be found as far east as Mongolia. The scarce copper is found at elevations of 1,000 to 2,000 meters, although in Armenia it inhabits meadows up to 2,700 meters above sea level. There have been several scientific debates about the Scarce Copper presence in Britain during the 19th century.

== Subspecies ==
- Lycaena virgaureae montanus Meyer-Dür, 1851 Found in the Alps in France, Switzerland, Italy, Germany, and Austria at elevations of 1,700–2,000 metres (5,600–6,600 ft).
- Lycaena virgaureae miegii Vogel, 1857 North and central Spain at elevations of 600–1,600 m (2,000–5,200 ft).
- Lycaena virgaureae armeniaca (A. Bang-Haas, 1906) Endemic of Armenia, occupies elevation range 1,800–2,700 m (5,900–8,900 ft).

== Description from Seitz ==
Male above red-golden, with a narrow black margin, at the proximal side of which there are dark dots on the hindwing: female cinnabar-red, spotted with black, the hindwing partly dusted with black. Underside leather-yellow, more sparsely spotted with black, before the outer third of the hind- wing pale dots, which are occasionally united in a white chain. The anal area dusted with red. The species occurs from the Atlantic coasts throughout Europe to East- Siberia and from the coast of the North Sea to the Mediterranean, but is absent from Great Britain and Japan. — In Lapland flies a small form, oranula Frr. (76 b), which is otherwise very similar to the name-typical form. — estonica Huene (76 b), from the Baltic provinces and eastern Russia, exactly resembles the preceding in size and shape, but has a broader black margin. — virgaureola Stgr. (76 b) is in size like virgaureae, but the upperside of the male is as in estonica; beneath the more reddish disc of the forewing contrasts with the more yellow hindwing and the white discal stripe of the latter is absent or reduced; from northern Central Asia, Dauria, Mongolia, and as similar aberration in the Swiss Alps. — males from the Apennines, in which the upperside is deeper red-golden and the base of the hindwing more densely dusted with dark, are apennina Calb. The females the contrary have the ground-colour paler and are less dusted with dark than many Central European specimens, the underside being hghter. According to Fallou the males from the Pyrenees are also deeper red. - On the other hand, the specimens from Mersina and the neighbouring Taurus Mts. have a bright light golden-red upperside in both sexes, the black margin being narrowed in the male. This is aureomicans Heyne. — Specimens with the underside of the hindwing strongly dusted with grey, the upperside of the female more-over having a brown-grey tint on account of the dark dusting on the golden ground, occur in many alpine districts with the ordinary form, being especially plentiful and well marked in the Alps of Valais; all such individuals are united as ab. zermattensis Fall. (76 a). It is hardly possible to decide from Fallou's very long description of this form which are the real characteristics of his aberration, so that strictly speaking not all the specimens standing in collections under this name belong here, particularly not all the specimens from the Valais; in fact only those individuals are true ab. zermattensis which, like phlaeas caeruleopunctata, have a chain of white dots before the outer third of the hindwing, as shown in the figure given in Ann. Soc. Ent. Fr. vol. V. pl. 2. Besides the modification of the colour of the upperside into sepia-brown, both sexes differ on the underside in the forewing bearing a broad dark margin and the hindwing being washed with fuscous, ab. seriata Fruhst. are zermattensis females which have a discal row of white dots on the hindwing proximally to the row of black spots, ab. fredegunda Fruhst. bears, besides those dots, a row of submarginal spots on the forewing beneath. [more vars described]The egg is semiglobular, grey-green, with a network of polygons, laid singly or several together on the stalk of the foot-plant. Larva green with a yellow stripe on back and at the sides, brownish head and brownish legs; at first glassy, transparent, later yellow on the back. Emerges in April and feeds until June on Rumex and Solidago. Pupa rounded, smooth, similar to a small bean, brownish, with dark markings; on the thorax a dark dorsal longitudinal stripe, which is continued on the abdomen by a row of impressed dots. The butterflies are on the wing from the end of June into August on meadows, clearings in woods, mountain-sides and flowery slopes; they are abundant almost everywhere in the area aru:! ascend in the high mountains above 10,000 ft.

== Gallery ==
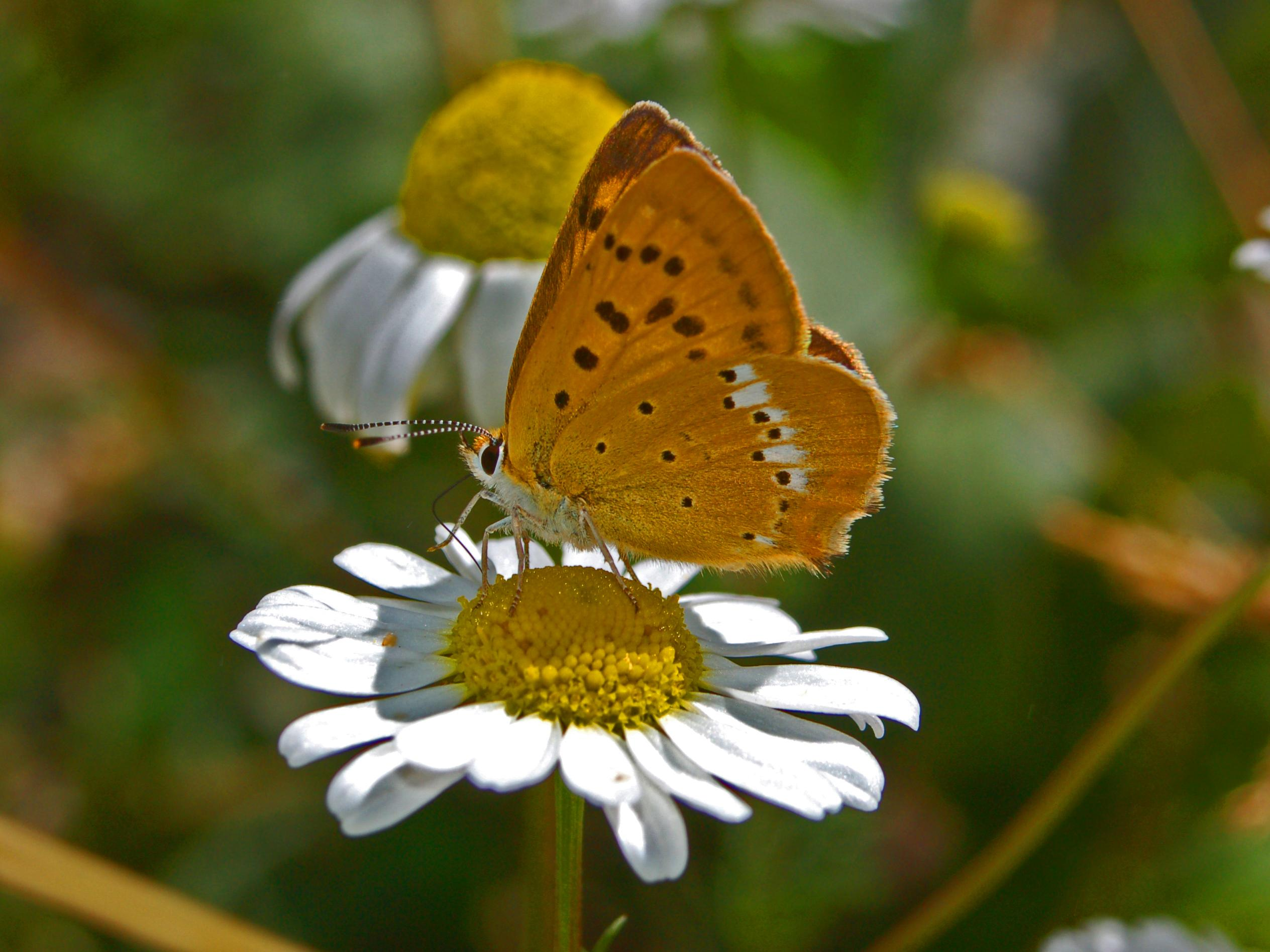
Lycaena virgaureae, female - lateral view

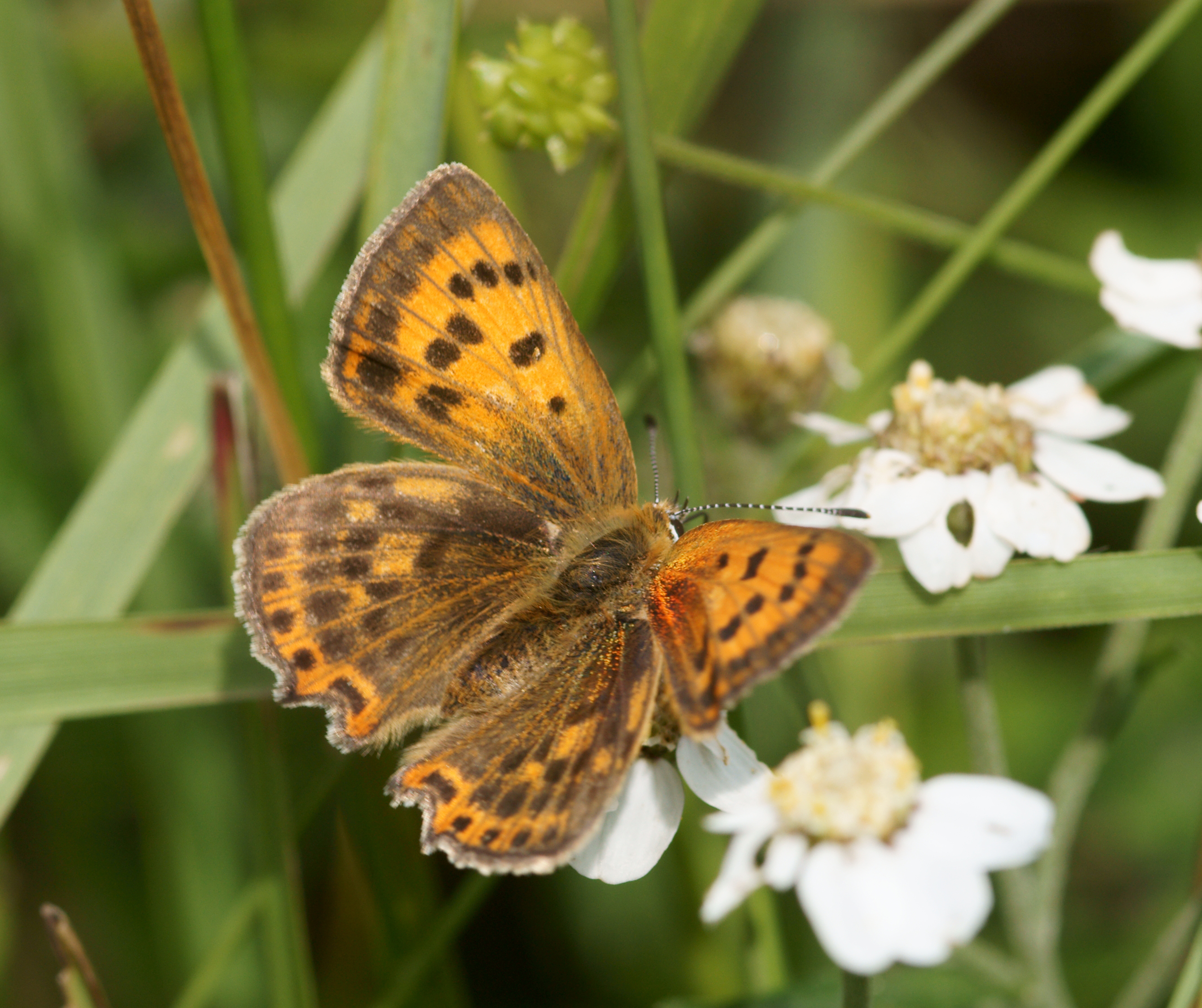
Lycaena virgaureae, female - dorsal view

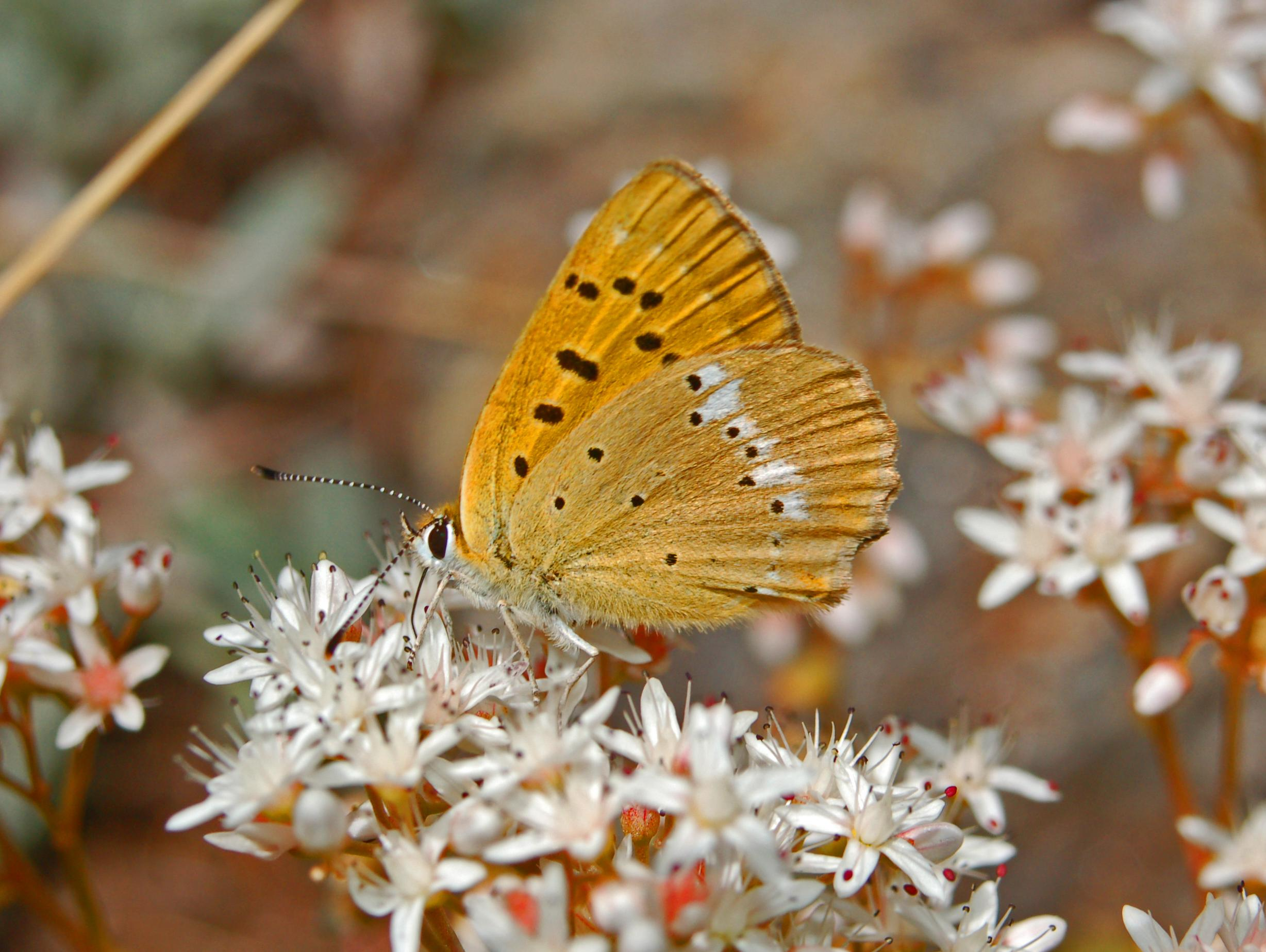
Lycaena virgaureae, male - lateral view

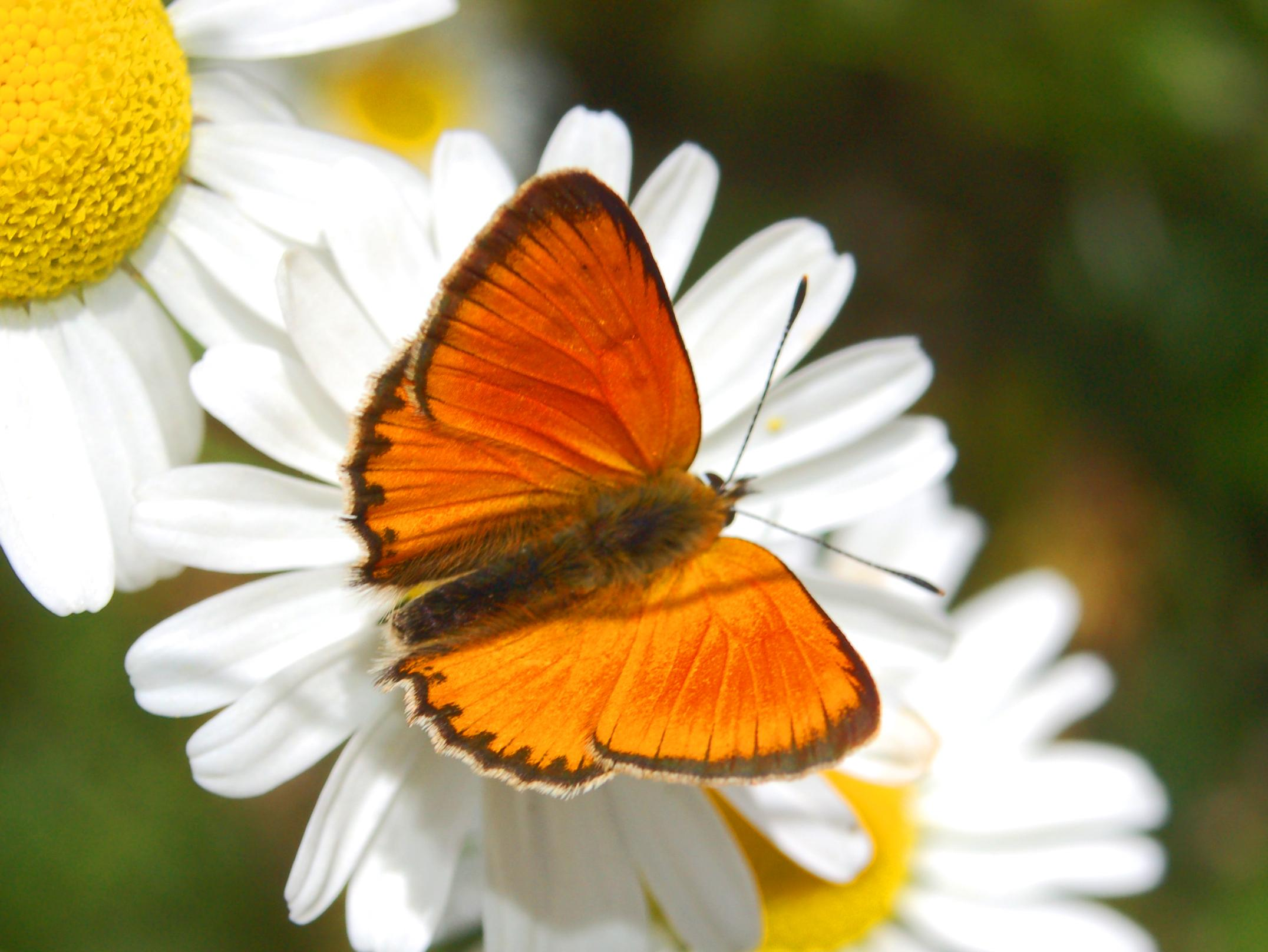
Lycaena virgaureae, male - dorsal view

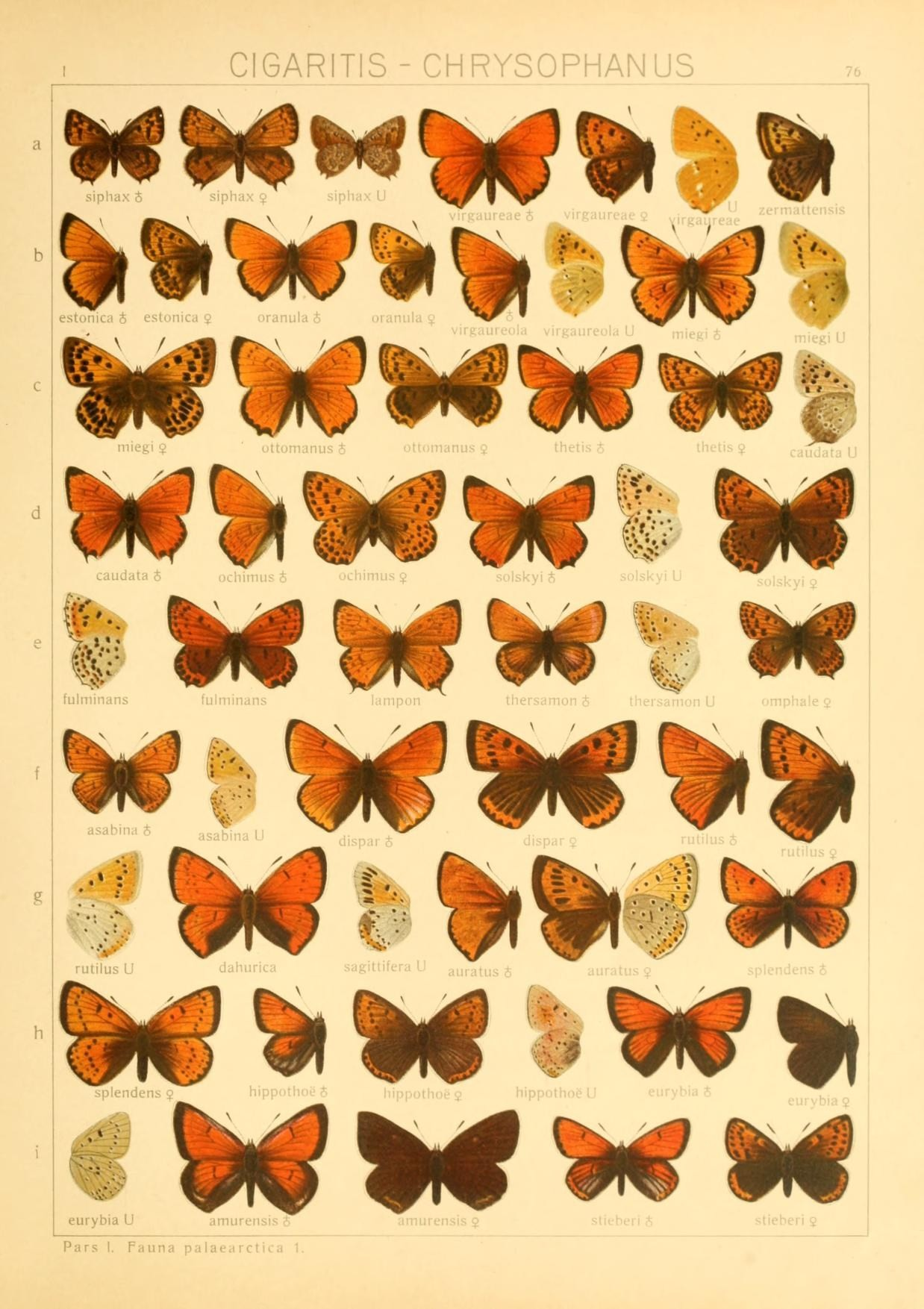
Seitz
