= Felice Cassone =

Italian botanist (1815–1854)

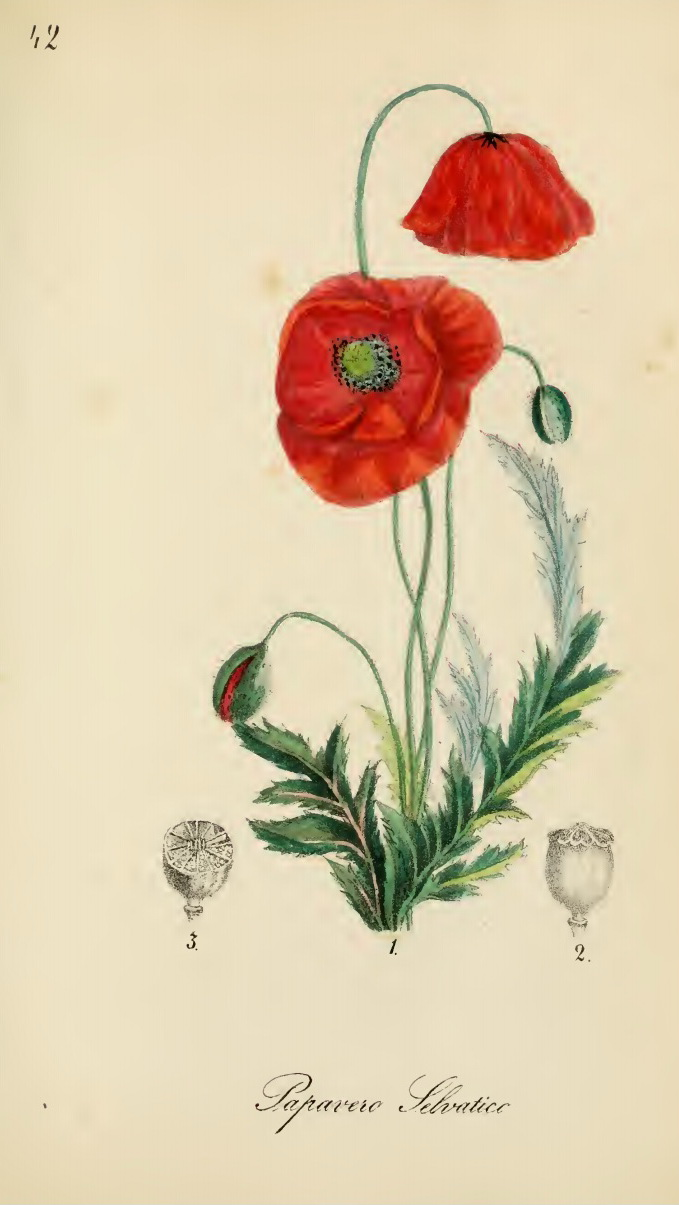
Papaver rhoeas L.

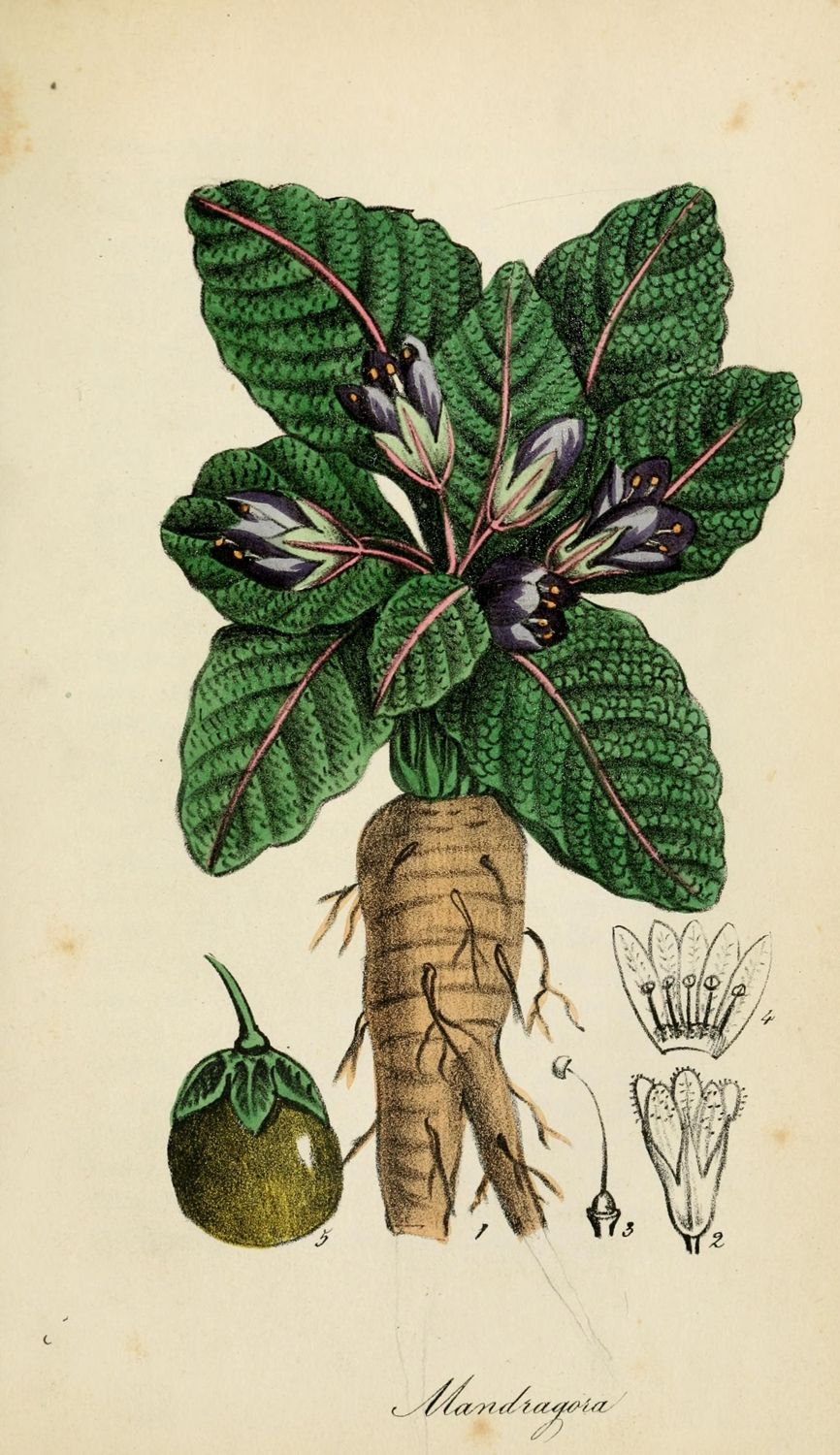
Mandragora officinarum L.

Felice Cassone (5 May 1815, Pontestura – 22 October 1854, Turin), was an Italian botanist and physician from the Piedmont region. Cassone is notable as the author of Flora medico-farmaceutica, a 6-volume work published in Torino with typography by Giuseppe Cassone between 1847 and 1852. The standard author abbreviation Cassone is used to indicate this person as the author when citing a botanical name.

Felice Cassone also published Iconografia Vegetale in 2 volumes between 1847 and 1849.
