= Lucius Caflisch =

Swiss international law specialist (born 1936)

Lucius Caflisch (born 31 August 1936) is a Swiss international law specialist.

Lucius Caflisch was a professor at the Graduate Institute of International Studies in Geneva. He was also director of the institute between 1984 and 1990.

In 1991, he became legal advisor for the Swiss Federal Département of Foreign Affairs and represented Switzerland at several international conventions, for example on banning personnel mines and on maritime law, and at negotiations creating the constitution of the international criminal court. He also acted as judge for the principality of Liechtenstein at the European Court of Human Rights between 1998 and 2006.

In 2006 Professor Caflisch was appointed to the Geneva-based United Nations International Law Commission.

== Sources ==
- Publication List of Prof. Lucius Caflisch (Graduate Institute of International Studies, Geneva)
- Election of Professor Lucius Caflisch to the UN International Law Commission (Swiss Federal Département of Foreign Affairs)
- Swiss joins prestigious UN law commission (Swissinfo)
