= Jakob Friedrich Caflisch =

German botanist

Jakob Friedrich Caflisch (3 March 1817 – 9 May 1882) was a German botanist born near Memmingen.

He spent the years from 1836 to 1838 at a teaching seminar in Altdorf, followed by teaching assignments in Leipheim, Neu-Ulm and Augsburg. He prematurely retired from teaching in 1861 due to problems with eyesight.

With Otto Sendtner (1813–1859), a professor of botany at the Ludwig-Maximilians-Universität München, he participated in scientific excursions in the vicinity of Augsburg and throughout the mountains of Allgäu. Caflisch's botanical research included studies on the effects that climate, altitude and soil conditions had upon the geographical distribution of plants.

He was a founding member of the Naturhistorischen Vereins in Augsburg (Natural History Society in Augsburg) and until his death in 1882, was in charge of the botanical collections at the Museum of Natural Sciences in Augsburg.

== Written works ==
- Uebersicht der flora von Augsburg, 1850 - Overview of flora of Augsburg.
- Beiträge zur Flora von Augsburg, 1867 - Contributions to the flora of Augsburg.
- Excursions-Flora für das südöstliche Deutschland, 1881 - Botanical excursions in southeastern Germany.
