= List of botanists by author abbreviation (Q–R) =

This is an incomplete list of botanists by their author abbreviation, which is designed for citation with the botanical names or works that they have published. This list follows that established by Brummitt & Powell (1992). Use of that list is recommended by Rec. 46A Note 1 of the International Code of Nomenclature for algae, fungi, and plants. The list is kept up to date online at The International Plant Names Index and Index Fungorum.

In some cases an "author abbreviation" consists of a full surname, while in other cases the surname is abbreviated and/or accompanied by one or more initials. There is no space between the initials and the surname (or its abbreviation).

==== Order of entries ====
The list here is maintained strictly in order of the alphabetic characters in the abbreviation; thus "A.B.Jacks." appears under "A" not "J", and is located as if the characters were "ABJACKS". Capitalization is ignored as are all non-alphabetic characters such as "." and space. Diacritical marks are also ignored, so that, e.g., "ü" is treated as if it were "u".

==== Navigation ====
Because of its length, the list is split across separate pages. All alphabetic sections can be accessed from the short table of contents; the vertical bars show the page divisions. Searching will only find an entry within a page.

== A–P ==
Contents:	A	B	C	D	E F	G	H	I J	K L	M	N O	P	Q R	S	T U V	W X Y Z

To find entries for A–P, use the table of contents above.

== Q ==
Contents: Top	A	B	C	D	E F	G	H	I J	K L	M	N O	P	Q R	S	T U V	W X Y Z

- Q.D.Clarkson – Quentin Deane Clarkson (born 1925)
- Q.E.Yang – Qin Er Yang (born 1964)
- Q.F.Wang – Guang Wan Hu (fl. 2007)
- Q.R.Liu – Quan Ru Liu (born 1963)
- Quehl – Leopold Quehl (1849–1922)
- Quél. – Lucien Quélet (1832–1899)
- Quézel – Pierre Ambrunaz Quézel (1926–2015)
- Quinn – Christopher John Quinn (born 1936)
- Quiñones – Luz Mila Quiñones (fl. 1995)
- Quinq. – Charles-Eugène Quinquaud (1841–1894)
- Quisumb. – Eduardo Quisumbíng y Argüelles (1895–1986)
- Quoy – Jean René Constant Quoy (1790–1869)
- Qureshi – Rizwana Aleem Qureshi (born 1950)
- Q.Wang – Qi Wang (fl. 1989)
- Q.W.Meng – Qian Wan Meng (fl. 2008)
- Q.W.Zeng – Qing Wen Zeng (1963–2012)
- Q.X.Guan – Qiu Xiang Guan (fl. 2014)
- Q.Xu – Qing Xu (botanist) (fl. 2014)

== R ==
Contents: Top	A	B	C	D	E F	G	H	I J	K L	M	N O	P	Q R	S	T U V	W X Y Z

- Raab-Straube – Eckhard von Raab-Straube (fl. 2003)
- Rabeh. – David Rabehevitra (fl. 2006)
- R.A.Black – Raleigh Adelbert Black (1880–1963)
- Rach – Louis Theodor Rach (1821–1859)
- R.A.Clement – Rose A. Clement (c. 1953–1996)
- Radcl.-Sm. – Alan Radcliffe-Smith (1938–2007)
- Raddi – Giuseppe Raddi (1770–1829)
- Raderm. – Jacob Cornelis Matthieu Radermacher (1741–1783)
- Radford – Albert Ernest Radford (1918–2006)
- Radius – Justus Wilhelm Martin Radius (1797–1884)
- Radlk. – Ludwig Adolph Timotheus Radlkofer (1829–1927)
- R.A.Dyer – Robert Allen Dyer (1900–1987)
- Raeusch. – Ernst Adolf Raeuschel (fl. 1772–1797)
- Raf. – Constantine Samuel Rafinesque (1783–1840)
- Raffill – Charles Percival Raffill (1876-1951)
- Raffles – Thomas Stamford Bingley Raffles (1781–1826)
- Rafn – Carl Gottlob Rafn (1769–1808)
- R.A.Foster – Robert A. Foster (1938–2002)
- R.A.Harper – Robert Almer Harper (1862–1946)
- Rahn – Knud Rahn (1928–2013)
- R.A.Howard – Richard Alden Howard (1917–2003)
- Rajakumar – T.J.S. Rajakumar (fl. 2009)
- Raim. – Rudolph Raimann (1863–1896)
- R.A.Kerrigan – Raelee A. Kerrigan (fl. 2012)
- Raleigh – Ruth E. Raleigh (fl. 1994)
- Ralfs – John Ralfs (1807–1890)
- Ralph Hoffm. – Ralph Hoffmann (1870–1932)
- Ramamoorthy – Thennilapuram Parasuraman Ramamoorthy (born 1945)
- R.A.Meissn. – Rachel A. Meissner (fl. 2007)
- Ram.Goyena – Miguel Ramírez Goyena (1857–1927)
- Ramond – Louis Ramond de Carbonnières (1755–1827)
- Rand – Isaac Rand (1674–1743)
- Randall – Roderick Peter Randall (born 1960)
- Randell – Barbara Rae Randell (born 1942)
- Randle – Christopher P. Randle (fl. 2006)
- Randolph – Lowell Fitz Randolph (1894–1980)
- Randrian. – Armand Randrianasolo (fl. 1994)
- Rands – Robert Delafield Rands (1890–1970)
- Raoul – Etienne Fiacre Louis Raoul (1815–1852)
- Rapaics – Raymund Rapaics von Rumwerth (or Ruhmwerth) (1885–1953) (forename also as Rajmond, Rajmund, or Raumund)
- Rapin – Daniel Rapin (1799–1882)
- R.A.Rodr. – Roberto A. Rodríguez (1944–2022)
- Rasm. – Rasmus Rasmussen (1871–1962)
- Raspail – François Vincent Raspail (1794–1878)
- Rassulova – Mukharram Rassulovna Rassulova (1926–2006)
- Rataj – Karel Rataj (1925–2014)
- Rathbone – Damien A. Rathbone (born 1980)
- Rathvon – Simon Snyder Rathvon (1812–1891)
- R.A.Towns. – Roberta Ann Townsend (born 1954)
- Rattan – Volney Rattan (1840–1915)
- Ratzeb. – Julius Theodor Christian Ratzeburg (1801–1871)
- Rau – Ananda R. Rao (born 1924)
- Rauh – Werner Rauh (1913–2000)
- Raunk. – Christen C. Raunkiær (1860–1938)
- Raup – Hugh Miller Raup (1901–1995)
- Rausch – Walter Rausch (1928–2022)
- Rauschert – Stephan Rauschert (1931–1986)
- Rauwolff – Leonhard (Leonhart) Rauwolf(f) (1535–1596)
- Raven – John Earle Raven (1914–1980)
- Ravenna – Pierfelice Ravenna (1938–2022)
- Ravi – N. Ravi (fl. 1969–1979)
- Rawé – Rolf Rawé (born 1938)
- R.A.W.Herrm. – Rudolf Albert Wolfgang Herrmann (born 1885)
- R.A.White – Richard Alan White (born 1935)
- Rawitscher – Felix Rawitscher (1890–1957)
- Rawson – Rawson W. Rawson (1812–1899)
- Ray – John Ray (1627–1705)
- Raym.-Hamet – Raymond-Hamet, also Raymond Hamet (1890–1972)
- Raymond – Louis-Florent-Marcel Raymond (1915–1972)
- Raynaud – Christian Raynaud (1939–1993)
- Rayner – John Frederick Rayner (1854–1947)
- Rayss – Tscharna Rayss (1890–1965)
- Razaf. – Alfred Razafindratsira (fl. 1987)
- Razafim. – Sylvain G. Razafimandimbison (fl. 1999)
- Razi – Basheer Ahmed Razi (1916–1999)
- R.Baron – Richard Baron (1847–1907)
- R.B.Clark – Robert Brown Clark (1914–2005)
- R.Bernal – Rodrigo Bernal (born 1959)
- R.Bustam. – Rene Alfred Anton Bustamante (born 1979)
- R.B.Pike – Radcliffe Barnes Pike (1903–1979)
- R.Br. – Robert Brown (1773–1858)
- R.Braga – Ruby Braga (fl. 1964)
- R.Br.bis – Robert Brown (1820–1906)
- R.Br.ter – Robert Brown (1842–1895)
- R.B.Singer – Rodrigo Bustos Singer (born 1970)
- R.B.Thomson – Robert Boyd Thomson (1870–1947)
- R.Butcher – Ryonen Butcher (born 1972)
- R.B.Wallis – Robert B. Wallis (fl. 2002)
- R.Carbajal – Rodrigo Carbajal (fl. 2017)
- R.C.Clark – Ross C. Clark (born 1940)
- R.C.Foster – Robert Crichton Foster (1904–1986)
- R.C.Gaur – R.C. Gaur (born 1933)
- R.Chan – Raymund Chan (born 1965)
- Rchb. – Heinrich Gottlieb Ludwig Reichenbach (1793–1879)
- Rchb.f. – Heinrich Gustav Reichenbach (1824–1889)
- R.C.Jacks. – Raymond Carl Jackson (1928–2008)
- R.C.K.Chung – Richard Cheng Kong Chung (fl. 1996)
- R.Clark – Ruth Clark (born 1975)
- R.C.Moran – Robbin C. Moran (born 1956)
- R.C.Nash – R.C.Nash (fl. 1976)
- R.C.Palmer – Richard Charles Palmer (1935–2005)
- R.C.Schneid. – Richard Conrad Schneider (born 1890)
- R.C.Sinclair – Robert C. Sinclair (fl. 1979)
- R.Cunn. – Richard Cunningham (1793–1835)
- R.Dahlgren – Rolf Martin Theodor Dahlgren (1932–1987)
- R.D.Edwards – Robert David Edwards (born 1981)
- R.D.Good – Ronald D'Oyley Good (1896–1992)
- R.Doll – Reinhard Doll (born 1941)
- R.D.Spencer – Roger David Spencer (born 1945)
- R.D.Thomas – Roy Dale Thomas (1936–2022)
- Reader – Felix Reader (1850–1911)
- Reboul – Eugène de Reboul (1781–1851)
- R.E.Brooks – Ralph Edward Brooks (born 1950)
- R.E.Buchanan — Robert Earle Buchanan (1883–1973)
- Rebut – Pierre Rebut (1827–1902)
- Rech. – Karl Rechinger (1867–1952)
- Rech.f. – Karl Heinz Rechinger (1906–1998)
- R.E.Clausen – Roy Elwood Clausen (1891–1956)
- R.E.Cleland – Ralph Erskine Cleland (1892–1971)
- R.E.Cook – Rachel E. Cook (fl. 2004)
- Record – Samuel James Record (1881–1945)
- R.E.Daniels – Roger Edward Daniels (born 1943)
- R.E.D.Baker – Richard Eric Defoe Baker (1908–1954)
- Redf. – Paul Leslie Redfearn (1926–2018)
- Redfield – John Howard Redfield (1815–1895)
- Redouté – Pierre-Joseph Redouté (1759–1840)
- Reeder – John Raymond Reeder (1914–2009)
- Rees – Abraham Rees (1743–1825)
- R.E.Fr. – Robert Elias Fries (1876–1966)
- Regel – Eduard August von Regel (1815–1892)
- Rehder – Alfred Rehder (1863–1949)
- Rehmann – Anton Rehmann (1840–1917)
- Reichard – Johann Jacob Reichard (1743–1782)
- Reichardt – Heinrich Wilhelm Reichardt (1835–1885)
- Reiche – Karl Friedrich Reiche (1860–1929)
- Reichert – Israel G. Reichert (1889–1975)
- Reichst. – Tadeus Reichstein (1897–1996)
- Reider – Jakob Ernst von Reider (1784–1853)
- Reimers – Hermann Johann O. Reimers (1893–1961)
- Reinh. – Otto Wilhelm Hermann Reinhardt (1838–1924)
- Reinke – Johannes Reinke (1849–1931)
- Reinsch – Paul Friedrich Reinsch (1836–1914)
- Reinw. – Caspar Georg Carl Reinwardt (1773–1854)
- Reiss – Frederick Reiss (fl. 1968)
- Reissek – Siegfried Reisseck (1819–1871)
- Reitter – Johann Daniel von Reitter (1759–1811)
- R.E.Kunze – Richard Ernest Kunze (1838–1919)
- R.E.Lee – Robert Edwin Lee (born 1911)
- R.Emers. – Ralph Emerson (1912–1979)
- Renault – Bernard Renault (1836–1904)
- Rendle – Alfred Barton Rendle (1865–1938)
- Renvoize – Stephen Andrew Renvoize (born 1944)
- Renz – Jany Renz (1907–1999)
- Req. – Esprit Requien (1788–1851)
- R.E.Schult. – Richard Evans Schultes (1915–2001)
- R.Escobar – Rodrigo Escobar (1935–2009)
- Resv.-Holms. – Hanna Resvoll-Holmsen (1873–1943)
- Resvoll – Thekla Resvoll (1871–1948)
- Retz. – Anders Johan Retzius (1742–1821)
- Reut. – George François Reuter (1805–1872)
- R.E.Vaughan – Reginald Edward Vaughan (1875–1987)
- Reveal – James Lauritz Reveal (1941–2015)
- Reyneke – William Frederick Reyneke (born 1945)
- Reynel – Carlos Reynel (fl. 1995)
- Reynolds – Gilbert Reynolds (1895–1967)
- Reznicek – Anton Albert Reznicek (born 1950)
- R.Fern. – Rosette Batarda Fernandes (1916–2005)
- R.F.Martin – Robert Franklin Martin (born 1910)
- R.G.Garcia – Ricardo G. García (fl. 1992)
- R.H.Anderson – Robert Henry Anderson (1899–1969)
- R.H.Archer – Robert H. Archer (born 1965)
- R.Harkn. – Robert Harkness (1816–1878)
- R.Hartig – Heinrich Julius Adolph Robert Hartig (1839–1901)
- R.Hedw. – Romanus Adolf Hedwig (1772–1806)
- Rheede – Hendrik Adriaan van Rheede tot Drakenstein (1636–1691)
- R.H.Jones – Rodney H. Jones (born 1951)
- R.H.Miao – Ru Huai Miao (born 1943)
- Rhode – Johann Gottlieb Rhode (1762–1827)
- R.Hoffm. – Reinhold Hoffmann (born 1885)
- R.Hogg – Robert Hogg (1818–1897)
- R.H.Petersen – Ronald H. Petersen (born 1934)
- R.H.Roberts – Richard Henry Roberts (1910–2003)
- R.H.Schomb. – Robert Hermann Schomburgk (1804–1865)
- R.H.Wallace – R. H. Wallace (fl. 1955)
- Riccob. – Vincenzo Riccobono (1861–1943)
- Rich. – Louis Claude Marie Richard (1754–1821)
- Richardson – John Richardson (1787–1865)
- Richens – Richard Hook Richens (1919–1984)
- Richerson – Peter James Richerson (born 1943)
- Ricken – Adalbert Ricken (1851–1921)
- Ricker – Percy Leroy Ricker (1878–1973)
- Ricketson – Jon M. Ricketson (fl. 1997)
- Riddell – John Leonard Riddell (1807–1865)
- Riddle – Lincoln Ware Riddle (1880–1921)
- Ridl. – Henry Nicholas Ridley (1855–1956)
- Ridsdale – Colin Ernest Ridsdale (1944–2017)
- Riedel – Ludwig Riedel (1790–1861)
- Rieder – Conly Leroy Rieder (born 1950)
- Riedl – Harald Udo von Riedl (born 1936)
- Rigg – George Burton Rigg (1872–1961)
- Rigoni – Victor A. Rigoni (fl. 1958)
- Říha – Jan Říha (1947–2022)
- Rink – Hinrich (Henrik) Johannes Rink (1819–1893)
- Riocreux – Alfred Riocreux (1820–1912)
- Ripková – Soňa Ripková (fl. 2004)
- Risso – Antoine Risso (1777–1845)
- Ritgen – Ferdinand August Maria Franz von Ritgen (1787–1867)
- Ritter – Karl Ritter (1800–)
- Riv. – Augustus Quirinus Rivinus (also as August Bachmann) (1652–1723)
- Rivadavia – Fernando Rivadavia (fl. 2003)
- Rivas Mart. – Salvador Rivas Martínez (1935–2020)
- Rivière – Marie Auguste Rivière (1821–1877)
- Rix – Edward Martyn Rix (born 1943)
- Rizzini – Carlos Toledo Rizzini (born 1921)
- R.J.Bates – Robert John Bates (born 1946)
- R.J.Bayer – Randall James Bayer (born 1955)
- R.J.Carp. – Raymond J. Carpenter (fl. 2008)
- R.J.D.Graham – Robert James Douglas Graham (1884–1950)
- R.J.Eaton – Richard Jefferson Eaton (1890–1976)
- R.J.F.Hend. – Rodney John Francis Henderson (born 1938)
- R.J.McKenzie – Robert J. McKenzie (fl. 2006)
- R.J.Moore – Raymond John Moore (1918–1988)
- R.J.Roberts – Ronald John Roberts (born 1941)
- R.J.Scheff. – R. J. Scheffer (fl. 1984)
- R.J.Wang – Rui Jiang Wang (fl. 1999)
- R.Keller – Robert Keller (1854–1939)
- R.K.Godfrey – Robert Kenneth Godfrey (1911–2000)
- R.Kiesling – Roberto Kiesling (born 1941)
- R.King – Robert King (fl. 1879)
- R.K.Jansen – Robert K. Jansen (born 1954)
- R.Klebs – Richard Klebs (1850–1911)
- R.Knuth – Reinhard Gustav Paul Knuth (1874–1957)
- R.K.S.Lee – Robert Kui Sung Lee (born 1931)
- R.L.Barrett – Russell Lindsay Barrett (born 1977)
- R.Lesson – René Primevère Lesson (1794–1849)
- R.L.Giles – Robyn L. Giles (fl. 2008)
- R.Mason – Ruth Mason (1913–1990)
- R.M.Barker – Robyn Mary Barker (born 1948)
- R.M.Beauch. – Ruble Mitchel Beauchamp (born 1946)
- R.M.Fonseca – Rosa María Fonseca (fl. 2005)
- R.M.Fritsch – Reinhard Michael Fritsch (born 1944)
- R.M.Harper – Roland McMillan Harper (1878–1966)
- R.Millar – Richard Millar (died 1833)
- R.M.Johnst. – Robert Mackenzie Johnston (1844–1918)
- R.M.King – Robert Merrill King (1930–2007)
- R.M.K.Saunders – Richard M.K. Saunders (born 1964)
- R.Morales – Ramón Morales Valverde (born 1950)
- R.Morgan – Robert Morgan (1863–1900)
- R.Morris – Richard Morris (fl. 1820–1830)
- R.M.Patrick – Ruth Patrick (1907–2013)
- R.M.Schust. – Rudolf M. Schuster (1921–2012)
- R.M.Sm. – Rosemary Margaret Smith (1933–2004)
- R.M.Tryon – Rolla Milton Tryon, Jr. (1916–2001)
- R.N.R.Br. – Robert Neal Rudmose-Brown (1879–1957)
- Rob. – William Robinson (1838–1935)
- Robatsch – Karl Robatsch (1929–2001)
- Robbertse – Petrus Johannes Robbertse (born 1932)
- Robbr. – Elmar Robbrecht (born 1946)
- Roberg – Lars Roberg (1664–1742)
- Robert – Gaspard Nicolas Robert (1776–1857)
- Robertson – David Robertson (1806–1896)
- Roberty – Guy Edouard Roberty (1907–1971)
- Robyns – Frans Hubert Edouard Arthur Walter Robyns (1901–1986)
- Rochebr. – Alphonse Trémeau de Rochebrune (1834–1912)
- Rochel – Anton Rochel (1770–1847)
- Rock – Joseph Rock (1884–1962)
- Rockley – Alicia Margaret Amherst Cecil Rockley (1865–1941)
- R.O.Cunn. – Robert Oliver Cunningham (1841–1918)
- Rodd – Anthony N. Rodd (born 1940)
- Rodin – Hippolyte Rodin (1829–1886)
- Rodion. – Georgi Ivanovich Rodionenko (1913–2014)
- Rodr. – José Demetrio Rodríguez (1780–1846)
- Rodrigo – América del Pilar Rodrigo (fl. 1938–1941)
- Rodway – Leonard Rodway (1853–1936)
- Roem. – Johann Jacob Roemer (1763–1819)
- Roezl – Benedikt Roezl (1824–1885)
- Roffavier – Georges Roffavier (1775–1866)
- Rogerson – Clark Thomas Rogerson (1918–2001)
- Rogow. – Athanasi Semenovich Rogowicz (1812–1878)
- Rohde – Michael Rohde (1782–1812)
- Röhl. – Johann Christoph Röhling (1757–1813)
- Rohr – Julius Philip Benjamin von Rohr (1737–1793)
- Rohrb. – Paul Rohrbach (1846–1871)
- Rohwer – Jens Gunter Rohwer (born 1958)
- Roiv. – Heikki Roivainen (1900–1983)
- Rojas – Teodoro Rojas (1877–1954)
- Rojas Acosta – Nicolás Rojas Acosta (1873–1946)
- Rolfe – Robert Allen Rolfe (1855–1921)
- Rol.-Goss. – Robert Roland-Gosselin (854-1925)
- Rolland – Léon Louis Rolland (1841–1912)
- Rollim – Isis Rollim (fl. 2020)
- Rollins – Reed Clark Rollins (1911–1998)
- Romagn. – Henri Romagnesi (1912–1999)
- Romans – Bernard Romans (c. 1720–1784)
- Rondelet – Guillaume Rondelet (1507–1566)
- Ronse Decr. – Louise-Philippe Ronse Decraene (born 1962)
- Rooke – Hayman Rooke (1723–1806)
- Rönn – Hans Ludwig Karl Rönn (1886–)
- Roque – Nadia Roque (fl. 1997)
- Rosatti – Thomas James Rosatti (born 1951)
- Roscoe – William Roscoe (1753–1831)
- Rose – Joseph Nelson Rose (1862–1928)
- Rosell. – Ferdinando Rosellini (1817–1873)
- Roselli – Francisco Lucas Roselli (1902–1987)
- Rosend. – Carl Otto Rosendahl (1875–1956)
- Roseng. – Bernardo Rosengurtt (1916–1985)
- Rosenstein (also N.Rosén) – Nils Rosén von Rosenstein (1706–1773)
- Rosentr. – Roger Rosentreter (born 1951)
- Rosenv. – Janus Lauritz Andreas Kolderup Rosenvinge (1858–1939)
- Roshev. – Roman Julievich Roshevitz (1882–1949)
- Ross – John Ross (1777–1856)
- Rossi – Pietro Rossi (1738–1804)
- Rossm. – Emil Adolf (Adolph) Rossmässler (1806–1867)
- Rostaf. – Józef Thomasz Rostafiński (1850–1928)
- Rostk. – Friedrich Wilhelm Gottlieb Theophil Rostkovius (1770–1848)
- Rostr. – Frederik Georg Emil Rostrup (1831–1907)
- Rota – Lorenzo Rota (1819–1855)
- Roth – Albrecht Wilhelm Roth (1757–1834)
- Rothm. – Werner Hugo Paul Rothmaler (1908–1962)
- Rothman – Göran Rothman (1739–1778)
- Rothr. – Joseph Trimble Rothrock (1839–1922)
- Rothsch. – Jules Rothschild (1838–1900)
- Rot Schreck. – Friedrich Rot von Schreckenstein (1753–1808)
- Rottb. – Christen Friis Rottbøll (1727–1797)
- Rottler – Johan Peter Rottler (1749–1836)
- Roubaud – Émile Roubaud (1882–1962)
- Roupell – Arabella Elizabeth Roupell (1817–1914)
- Rourke – John Patrick Rourke (born 1942)
- Roush – Eva Myrtelle Roush (1886–1954)
- Rousseau – Jean-Jacques Rousseau (1712–1778)
- Roussel – Henri François Anne de Roussel (1747–1812)
- Roux – Jacques Roux (1773–1822)
- Rouy – Georges Rouy (1851–1924)
- Rowe – Ross Robert Mackerras (born 1966)
- R.O.Williams – Robert Orchard Williams (1891–1967)
- Rowland – Verner Hawsbrook Rowland (1884–1967)
- Rowntree – Lester Gertrude Ellen Rowntree (1879–1979)
- Roxb. – William Roxburgh (1751–1815)
- Royen – Adriaan van Royen (1704–1779)
- Royle – John Forbes Royle (1798–1858)
- Roy L.Taylor – Roy Lewis Taylor (1932–2013)
- Rozanova – Maria Aleksandrovna Rozanova (Maria Alexandrovna Rozanova) (1885–1957)
- Rozefelds – Andrew Carl Frank Rozefelds (born 1960)
- Rozier – François Rozier (Jean-François) (1734–1793)
- R.Parker – Richard Neville Parker (1884–1958)
- R.Patt. – Robert Patterson (born 1947)
- R.P.Ellis – Roger Pearson Ellis (born 1944)
- R.P.Murray – Richard Paget Murray (1842–1908)
- R.Pott – Reino Pott (1869–1965)
- R.P.White – Richard Peregrine White (1896–1993)
- R.Rabev. – Raymond Rabevohitra (born 1946)
- R.R.Bloxam – Richard Rowland Bloxam (1798–1877)
- R.R.Haynes – Robert Ralph Haynes (born 1945)
- R.Rice – Rod Rice (born 1963)
- R.Ross – Robert Ross (1912–2005)
- R.R.Rao – R.Raghavendra Rao (born 1945)
- R.R.Scott – Robert Robinson Scott (1827–1877)
- R.R.Stewart – Ralph Randles Stewart (1890–1993)
- R.S.Almeida – Rafael S. Almeida (fl. 1998)
- R.Schultz – Richard Schultz (1858–1936)
- R.S.Cowan – Richard Sumner Cowan (1921–1997)
- R.S.Hill – Robert Southey Hill (born 1954)
- R.S.Irving – Robert Stewart Irving (born 1942)
- R.S.Rogers – Richard Sanders Rogers (1861–1942)
- R.S.Wallace – Robert S. Wallace (fl. 1997)
- R.S.Williams – Robert Statham Williams (1859–1945)
- R.T.Baker – Richard Thomas Baker (1854–1941)
- R.T.Clausen – Robert Theodore Clausen (1911–1981)
- R.T.Mill. – R. T. Miller (fl. 2012)
- R.T.Veitch – Robert Veitch (1823–1885)
- Rudall – Paula J. Rudall (born 1954)
- Rudd – Velva Elaine Rudd (1910–1999)
- Rudge – Edward Rudge (1763–1846)
- Rudolph – Johann Heinrich Rudolph (1744–1809)
- Rudolphi – Karl Rudolphi (1771–1832)
- R.Uechtr. – Rudolf Friedrich von Uechtritz (1838–1886)
- Rugel – Ferdinand Ignatius Xavier Rugel (1806–1879)
- Ruhland – Wilhelm Otto Eugen Ruhland (1878–1960)
- Ruiz – Hipólito Ruiz López (1754–1815)
- Rule – Kevin James Rule (born 1941)
- Rumph. – Georg Eberhard Rumphius (1628–1702)
- Rümpler – Karl Theodor Rümpler (1817–1891)
- Rundel – Philip Wilson Rundel (born 1943)
- Runemark – Hans Runemark (1927–2014)
- Rupin – Ernest (Jean Baptiste) Rupin (1845–1909)
- Rupp – Herman Rupp (1872–1956)
- Ruppius – Heinrich Bernard Ruppius (1688–1719)
- Rupr. – Franz Josef Ruprecht (1814–1870)
- Rusby – Henry Hurd Rusby (1855–1940)
- Russow – Edmund August Friedrich Russow (1841–1897)
- Rustan – Øyvind H. Rustan (born 1954)
- Rutenb. – Diedrich Christian Rutenberg (1851–1878)
- Rutherf. – Daniel Rutherford (1749–1819)
- Rutk. – Piotr Rutkowski (born 1969)
- Ruysch – Frederik Ruysch (1638–1731)
- R.Vásquez – Roberto Vásquez (born 1941)
- R.Vig. – René Viguier (1880–1931)
- R.Vilm. – Roger de Vilmorin (1905–1980)
- R.V.Sm. – Raymond Vaughan Smith (born 1923)
- R.Wagner – Rudolf Wagner (born 1872)
- R.Wallis – Rannveig Wallis (fl. 2002)
- R.Warner – Robert Warner (c. 1815–1896)
- R.W.Br. – Roland Wilbur Brown (1893–1961)
- R.W.Darwin – Robert Waring Darwin of Elston (1724–1816)
- R.W.Davis – Robert Wayne Davis (born 1959)
- R.W.Ham – R.W.J.M.van der Ham (born 1951)
- R.Wilczek – Rudolf Wilczek (1903-1984)
- R.W.Jobson – Richard W. Jobson (fl. 2007)
- R.W.Long – Robert William Long (1927–1976)
- R.W.Pohl – Richard Walter Pohl (1916–1993)
- R.W.Wallace – Robert Whistler Wallace (1867–1955)
- Rycroft – Hedley Brian Rycroft (1918–1990)
- Rydb. – Per Axel Rydberg (1860–1931)
- Rye – Barbara Lynette Rye (born 1952)
- R.Yonzone – Rajendra Yonzone (fl. 2012)
- Ryppowa – Halina w Kowalskich Ryppowa (1899–1927)
- Rzed. – Jerzy Rzedowski (1926–2023)

== S–Z ==
Contents: Top	A	B	C	D	E F	G	H	I J	K L	M	N O	P	Q R	S	T U V	W X Y Z

To find entries for S–Z, use the table of contents above.

== See also ==
- List of South African plant botanical authors
- List of botanists
- Category:Botanists
- List of Russian botanists
- List of zoologists by author abbreviation
