= Megachile chrysopogon =

Scientific classification
- Domain: Eukaryota
- Kingdom: Animalia
- Phylum: Arthropoda
- Class: Insecta
- Order: Hymenoptera
- Family: Megachilidae
- Genus: Megachile
- Species: M. chrysopogon

Binomial name
- Megachile chrysopogon Vachal, 1910

Synonyms
- Megachile flavibasis Cockerell, 1920; Megachile heterotricha Cockerell, 1920; Megachile candidicauda Cockerell, 1932; Megachile candidigena Cockerell, 1932; Megachile neli Cockerell, 1937; Megachile candidicauda spinarum Cockerell, 1937; Megachile albofilosa Cockerell, 1937; Megachile discretula Cockerell, 1937; Megachile rubeola Pasteels, 1965; Megachile meesi Pasteels, 1966

Species of leafcutter bee (Megachile)

Megachile chrysopogon is a species of bee in the family Megachilidae. It was described by Vachal in 1910.
