= Megachile hecate =

Scientific classification
- Kingdom: Animalia
- Phylum: Arthropoda
- Clade: Pancrustacea
- Class: Insecta
- Order: Hymenoptera
- Family: Megachilidae
- Genus: Megachile
- Species: M. hecate

Binomial name
- Megachile hecate Vachal, 1903

Species of leafcutter bee (Megachile)

Megachile hecate is a species of leafcutter bee in the family Megachilidae. It was first described by French entomologist Joseph Vachal in 1903.

== Distribution ==
Megachile hecate is an Afrotropical species. It is natively distributed across East Africa, with documented populations in Tanzania.

== Behavior and ecology ==
As a member of the genus Megachile, M. hecate is a solitary, non-aggressive bee. While specifics regarding its nesting habits remain poorly documented, species within this genus typically construct nests in pre-existing cavities such as hollow plant stems, wood borings, or burrows in the soil. Females cut neat, oval or circular discs from leaves or flower petals to line and seal individual brood cells, providing insulation and protection against desiccation for the developing larvae.
