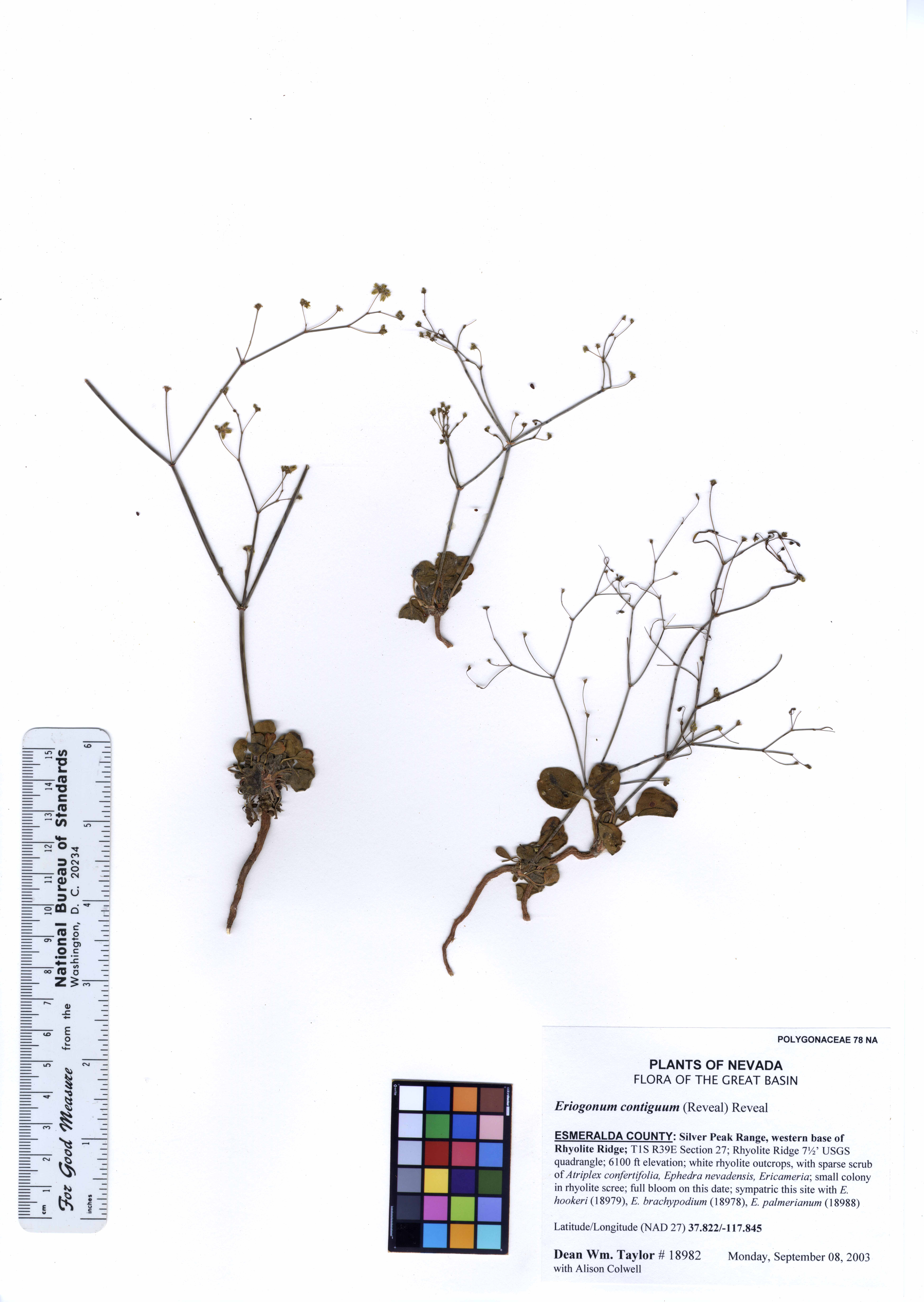

Conservation status
- Vulnerable (NatureServe)

Scientific classification
- Kingdom: Plantae
- Clade: Tracheophytes
- Clade: Angiosperms
- Clade: Eudicots
- Order: Caryophyllales
- Family: Polygonaceae
- Genus: Eriogonum
- Species: E. contiguum

Binomial name
- Eriogonum contiguum (Reveal) Reveal

Synonyms
- Eriogonum cordatum

= Eriogonum contiguum =

Species of wild buckwheat

Eriogonum contiguum is an uncommon species of wild buckwheat. It is commonly known as Reveal's buckwheat and annual desert trumpet. It is native to Death Valley in California and adjacent sections of Nevada. It is commonly found in Death Valley National Park and Mojave National Preserve. Eriogonum contiguum grows in sandy to gravelly flats and slopes, or rocky hills, and lower bajadas with Atriplex species. It is an annual herb which produces an erect, spreading stem up to about 30 centimeters high. Leaves are basal, small rounded, and woolly. The many scattered inflorescences are small, compact clusters of tiny hairy yellow flowers. Flowers bloom April to June. It is threatened due to habitat degradation by off-road vehicles, competition with exotic plant species, trampling, grazing, and erosion.

== Taxonomy ==
Eriogonum contiguum was first described as a variety of Eriogonum inflatum in 1970 by James L. Reveal. Two years later in 1972, he revised his opinion and published it as a species. It is classified in the genus Eriogonum as part of the Polygonaceae family. The species has three synonyms, including one species name.

Table of Synonyms
Name	Year	Rank	Notes
Eriogonum cordatum Torr. & Frém.	1845	species	= het., nom. utique rej.
Eriogonum inflatum var. contiguum Reveal	1970	variety	≡ hom.
Eriogonum trichopes subsp. cordatum (Torr. & Frém.) S.Stokes	1936	subspecies	= het.
Notes: ≡ homotypic synonym ; = heterotypic synonym
