= Conly =

Conly (a variant of Conley) is an Irish name (from Ó Conghalaigh). It may refer to:

== People ==
=== Surname ===
- Jane Leslie Conly (born 1948), an American author
- Paul Conly, musician with Lothar and the Hand People
- Robert Leslie Conly (1918–1973), author under the pen name Robert C. O'Brien
- Sean Conly, bass player for Grass Roots

=== Given name ===
- Conly Rieder, cancer researcher
- Conly John Paget Dease (1906–1979), Australian quiz show host

== Other uses ==
- Conly Site, Bienville Parish, Louisiana, listed on the NRHP in Louisiana
