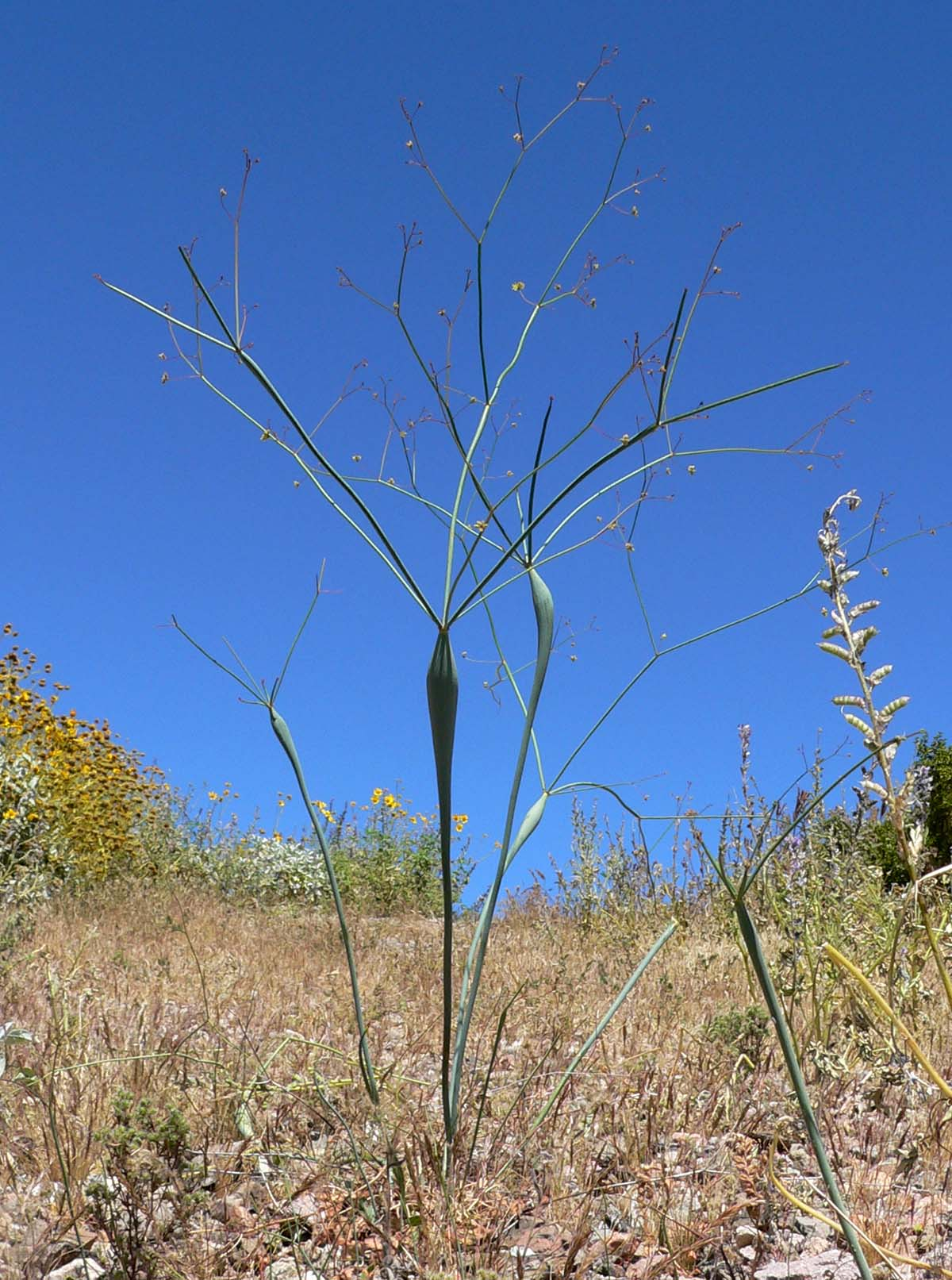
- The distinctive inflated stem

Conservation status
- Secure (NatureServe)

Scientific classification
- Kingdom: Plantae
- Clade: Tracheophytes
- Clade: Angiosperms
- Clade: Eudicots
- Order: Caryophyllales
- Family: Polygonaceae
- Genus: Eriogonum
- Species: E. inflatum

Binomial name
- Eriogonum inflatum Torr.

Synonyms
- Eriogonum glaucum

= Eriogonum inflatum =

Desert trumpet

Species of wild buckwheat

Eriogonum inflatum, the desert trumpet, is a perennial plant of the family buckwheat family. The plant possesses very small yellow flowers and an inflated stem just below branching segments. It is found in the deserts of the southwestern United States and northwestern Mexico as far east as western Colorado and the Four Corners region.

== Description ==
Desert trumpets are generally perennial, but will occasionally flower in their first year, growing erect flowering stems that usually have a total height of between 10 centimeters (4 in) and 1 meter (3.3 ft) tall, but can sometimes reach 1.5 m (4.9 ft). Each plant will have one or more blue-green stems are strikingly enlarged and hollow at the nodes where they branch. The secondary branches off the main stem are also slightly inflated where they branch, with the size of the swelling is related to water availability with it being smaller or absent in dry conditions and those in the summer being smaller than those in the spring.

The broad leaves are all basal, sprouting from the base of the plant. They are oblong to oblong-ovate, blocky with rounded corners to somewhat egg shaped, or reniform to rounded, kidney shaped to almost circular, with a length of 0.5–3 cm and a width of 0.5–2.5 cm. They are attached to the base of the plant by leaf stems 2–6 cm (1–2.5 in) long and usually covered in short hairs giving them a gray color.

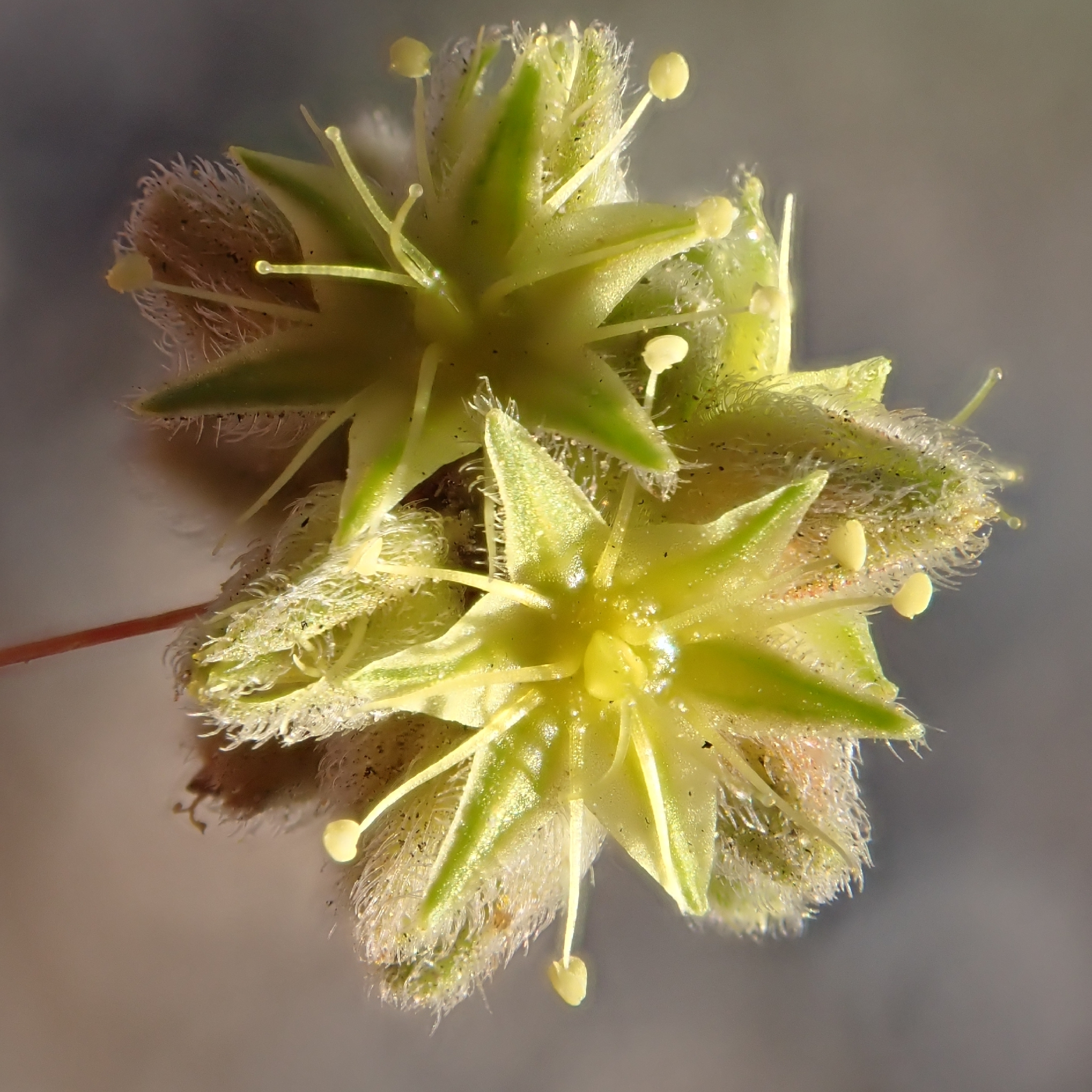
Closeup of the flower

The flowers are small and yellow with reddish to green midribs, 1–3 mm long, but usually 2–2.5 mm. in length. The tepals are narrowly ovoid to ovate. Each flower has nine stamens, extending out of the flower with a total length of 1.3–1.5 mm.

=== Stems ===
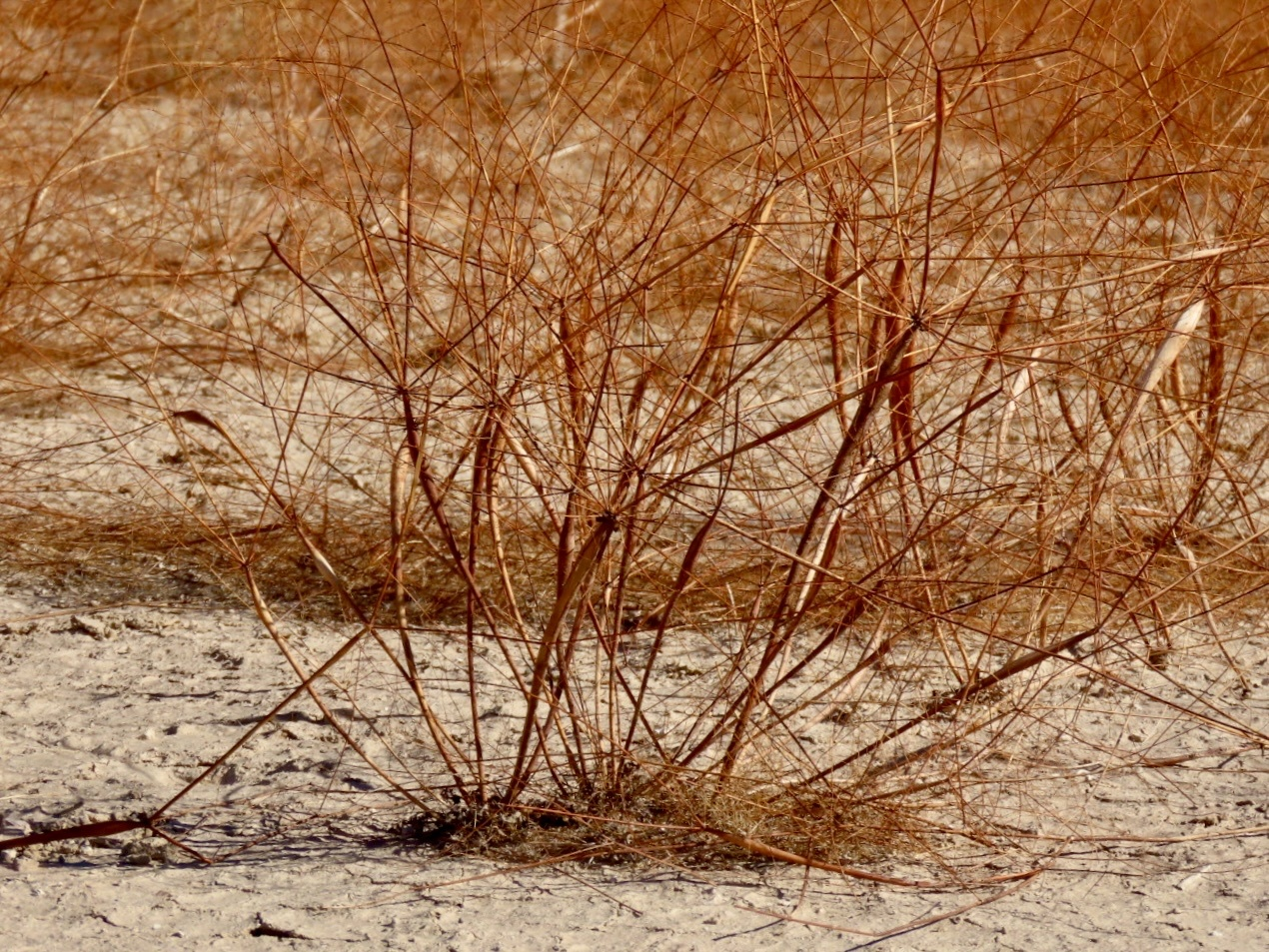
Fall colors, October near the Amargosa River, south of Tecopa, California

The straight portion of the stem to the first branching is usually 20 to 50 centimeters (8–20 in), but can be as short as 2 cm (1 in). The diameter of the stem can be around 1.3 cm (0.5 in). The swelling of the stems was assumed to have been influenced by the presence of gall insects, which was attributed in one widely quoted study to the larvae of moths or beetles.

The relative large stem is actually used as an alternative to the leaves, extending the season where the plant can photosynthesize past the spring. The stem is filled with carbon dioxide at a concentration that remains consistently 20-times higher inside the stem cavity than in the outside air during the day. The high CO_{2} only seems to contribute minimally to what is used by the stem in photosynthesis, but may increase the efficiency of water usage during photosynthesis in the stems. The CO_{2} is apparently provided by the plant itself from respiration by the taproot with the channel continuing down the stem and into the root.

Some insects utilize the swollen stem as a location to lay eggs, however at least one well known instance does not occur. In the 1941 book Desert Wild Flowers by Edmund C. Jaeger, and subsequent printings as late as the 1950 revised edition, he reported that wasps would use the stems as a nesting location.

Wasps of the genus Onyerus sometimes use the hollow stems as a larder. This the wasp accomplishes by drilling a hole near the top of one of the inflations and filling the lower constriction with small pebbles. Then the tiny wasp will pile in a surprisingly large number of insect larvae, pack them tightly down into the cavity, and lay her eggs upon them. The remaining part of the inflated stem is filled up with more grains of sand to make the storehouse secure.

However, this genus does not exist. There is a genus of ground nesting wasp named Odynerus, but other naturalists doubt that wasps of this genus could have been observed by Jaeger. Species that have been reliably observed using the stems for nesting include Solierella blaisdelli, Solierella plenoculoides similis, Lomachaeta hicksi, and Hedychridium solierellae.

== Taxonomy ==
The botanist John Torrey scientifically described Eriogonum inflatum in 1845, placing it in the Eriogonum genus. Torrey described the species from specimens collected by John C. Frémont at a location that he described as "along the Mojave River", but was likely collected west of Baker in California at Bitter Springs. The first time Frémont noted the species was on 24 April 1844, writing, "here, among many new plants, a new and very remarkable species of eriogonum made its first appearance." The species is classified alongside its relatives in the Polygonaceae family and has four botanical synonyms.

Table of Synonyms
Name	Year	Rank	Notes
Eriogonum glaucum Small	1898	species	= het.
Eriogonum inflatum var. deflatum I.M.Johnst.	1924	variety	= het.
Eriogonum inflatum subsp. typicum S.Stokes	1936	subspecies	≡ hom., not validly publ.
Eriogonum trichopes subsp. glaucum (Small) S.Stokes	1936	subspecies	= het.
Notes: ≡ homotypic synonym; = heterotypic synonym

== Names ==
Eriogonum inflatum is frequently known by the common name desert trumpet, which like the scientific name references the shape of the enlarged flowering stem. It is also known as bottlebush, bottlestopper, bladderstem inflated stem buckwheat, or inflated wild buckwheat.

It is called tosanan bawkip by the Timbisha Shoshone Tribe in their own language.

== Range and habitat ==
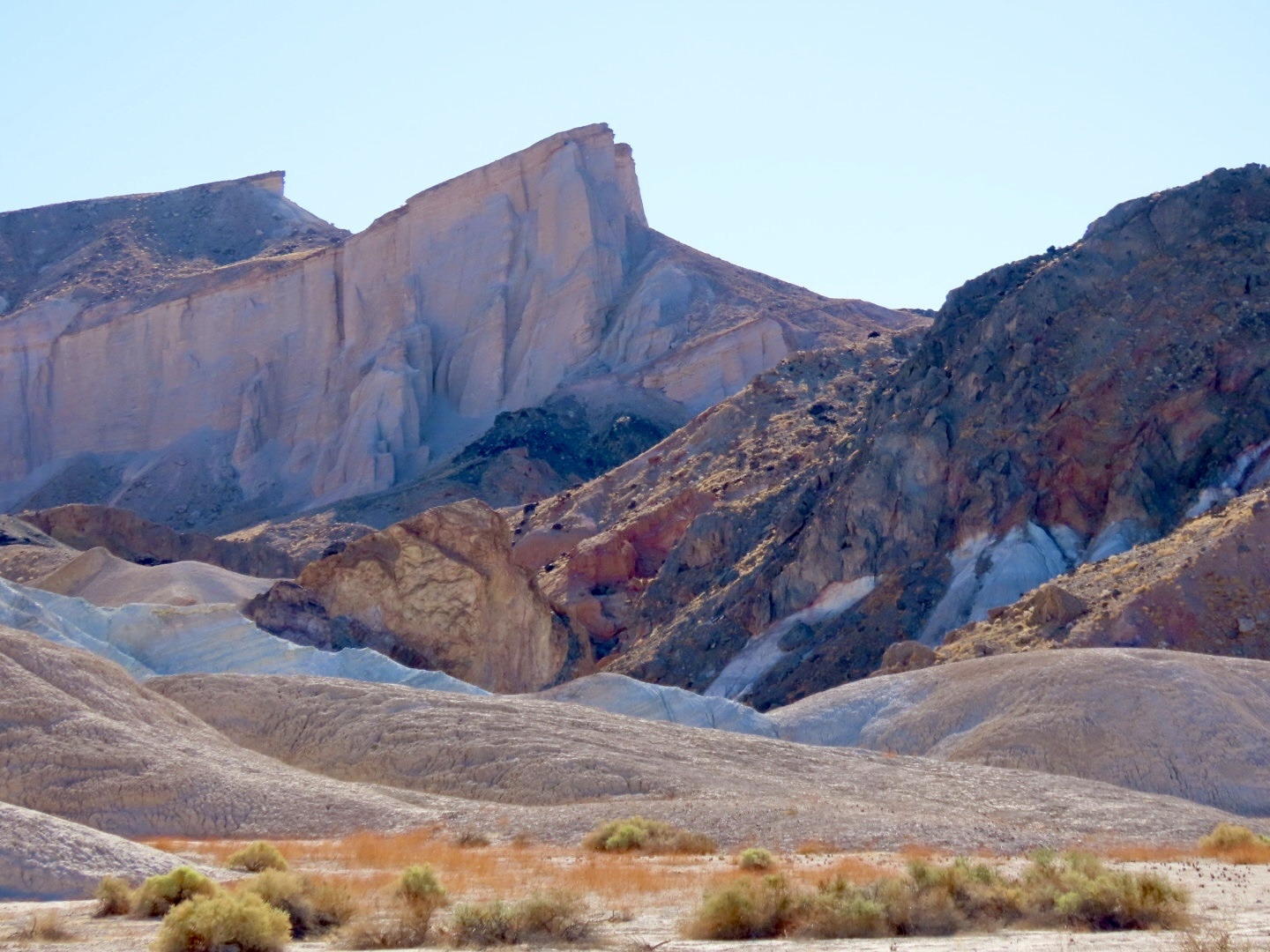
Desert trumpets in red fall color on the flats near the Amargosa River in the Mojave Desert

Desert trumpet is native to northern Mexico and the southwestern United States. In Mexico it is mostly found in the northwest, where it grows in Baja California Sur, Baja California, and Sonora, but it also grows to the east in Chihuahua.

To the north in California it grows in the eastern Mojave and Sonoran deserts in southern California and their associated mountains and in the Californian parts of the Great Basin including the White Mountains, Inyo Mountains, Modoc Plateau, and Warner Mountains. In Nevada it is mostly found in the southern counties, but has been documented in almost every county in Arizona. The species only grows in San Juan County, the most northwestern county in New Mexico, but grows in much of the south and east of Utah. In Colorado it only grows in six far western counties; Rio Blanco, Garfield, Mesa, Delta, and Montrose in the central west and Montezuma County in the southwest corner of the state. It can be found at elevations of 1,800 meters (5,900 ft) to 30 m (98 ft) below sea level in desert basins.

Desert trumpets generally grow in dry locations such as washes, hillsides, slopes, and flats. They grow on various substrates including gravel soils, sand, clay, and even broken shale. They can be found in dry grasslands, with four-winged saltbrush scrub, creosote bush scrub, sagebrush scrub, and pinyon–juniper woodlands.

== Ecology ==
Caterpillars of the desert metalmark butterfly (Apodemia mormo deserti) feed upon desert trumpets. It is also heavily browsed by desert bighorn sheep.

== Uses ==
A mixture of wild tobacco and creosote mistletoe would be smoked as a medicine by the Moapa Band of Paiute people. The species was recommended by the botanist Lester Rowntree as a garden plant.

This plant makes a brief appearance in Star Trek: Voyager, in Season 3, episode 1, Basics, Part II at 3 minute 38 seconds into the show, when the character Neelix is shown to be looking at a picked specimen.
