= Hoffmanniella =

Scientific classification
- Kingdom: Plantae
- Clade: Tracheophytes
- Clade: Angiosperms
- Clade: Eudicots
- Clade: Asterids
- Order: Asterales
- Family: Asteraceae
- Subfamily: Asteroideae
- Tribe: Heliantheae
- Subtribe: Ecliptinae
- Genus: Hoffmanniella; Schltr. ex Lawalrée 1943
- Species: H. silvatica

Binomial name
- Hoffmanniella silvatica Schltr. ex Lawalrée 1943

Synonyms
- Hoffmanniella Schltr. 1900, name published without description; Hoffmanniella silvatica Schltr. 1900, name published without description

Genus of flowering plants

Hoffmanniella is a monotypic genus of flowering plants in the family Asteraceae. There is only one known species, Hoffmanniella silvatica.

It is native to central Africa and found in the countries of Gabon, Cameroon and Zaire.

The genus name of Hoffmanniella is in honour of Karl August Otto Hoffmann (1853–1909), a South African botanist, and the Latin specific epithet of silvatica comes from silva and means coming from the wood. Both the genus and species were first described and published in Bull. Jard. Bot. État Bruxelles Vol.17 on page 60 in 1943.
