= Joseph Burtt Davy =

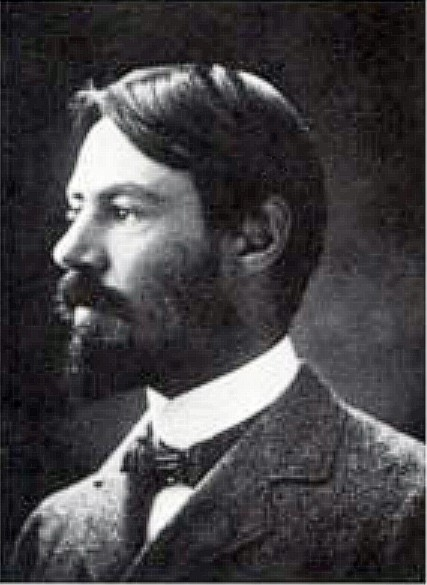
- Joseph Burtt Davy in 1899
- Born: 7 March 1870; Findern, Derbyshire
- Died: 20 August 1940 (aged 70); Birmingham
- Scientific career
- Author abbrev. (botany): Burtt Davy

Joseph Burtt Davy (7 March 1870 Findern, Derbyshire – 20 August 1940 Birmingham) was a Quaker botanist and agrostologist. He was the first curator of the Forest Herbarium (FHO) at the Imperial Forestry Institute when it was founded in 1924 under the Directorship of Professor Robert Scott Troup.

He attended school at Ilkley in West Yorkshire. In 1891, he joined Kew Gardens as a technical assistant, leaving shortly after for the United States where he enrolled in the botany department at the University of California. Here he studied agriculture from 1893–96 and took up the post of botanist at the Agricultural Experiment Station in California between 1896–1901, describing the Cyperaceae and Gramineae for A Flora of Western Middle California by Willis Linn Jepson. Here he also met his wife-to-be, Alice Bolton (1863–1953), a native Californian.

Davy wrote the pioneering work that was published in 1903, "Stock Ranges of Northwestern California: Notes on the Grasses and Forage Plants and Range Conditions" where he set out to discover what remained of the original native grasslands in the northwestern part of the State, and interviewed ranchers to determine what the sequence of the introduction of exotics to the grasslands occurred. The report includes the counties of Lake, Mendocino, Humboldt, Trinity, Del Norte, and the portion of Siskiyou lying west of the California and Oregon Railroad. The report's area is bounded on the east by the inner Coast Range Mountains and on the west by the Pacific Ocean, and covers the whole of the drainage basins of the Eel, Mad, Trinity, Lower Klamath, and Smith rivers and the smaller streams along the coast north of the Grualala River. To the south, includes Lake County and the southern boundary of Mendocino County, thereby taking in the drainage basin of Clear Lake and the headwaters of Russian River.

In early 1903, he was appointed botanist and agrostologist with the newly founded Transvaal Department of Agriculture. Burtt Davy wasted no time in starting a collection of Transvaal plants, a process by which he acquired an intimate knowledge of the subject. These first specimens came from Meintjieskop, Irene and a trip to the western Transvaal – at the time of his retirement in 1913, his collected specimens numbered 14,000.

Burtt Davy's appointment led directly to the founding of the Division of Botany. This later became the Botanical Research Institute (BRI) and then the National Botanical Institute (NBI) in 1989 when it amalgamated with the National Botanic Gardens. Still not content, bureaucracy stepped in once more in 2004 and it was renamed the South African National Biodiversity Institute (SANBI).

One of Burtt Davy's great interests was the subject of plant introduction, a matter to which he devoted much attention, importing plants and seeds from all over the world. He was responsible for introducing the forage crop, teff, as well as the lawn grass Kikuyu. He helped establish a maize-breeding centre at Vereeniging and resigned shortly before the publication of his comprehensive work on maize in 1914.

He moved to his own farm 'Burttholm' near Vereeniging, where he set up a partnership with the Hon. Hugh Wyndham, breeding and growing agricultural seed and Hereford cattle. The enterprise flourished and Burtt Davy was able to retire to England in 1919, returning to Kew and working on A Manual of the Flowering Plants and Ferns of the Transvaal with Swaziland, Part 1 appearing in 1926 and Part 2 in 1932. The line drawings for this valuable taxonomic work were produced by his wife, Alice Bolton Davy.

He was awarded a Ph.D.from Cambridge in 1925 and took up the post of lecturer in tropical forest botany at the Imperial Forestry Institute at Oxford. Here he started work on the series Forest Trees and Timbers of the British Empire. He was awarded a D.Phil. degree by the University in 1937.

He is commemorated in the genus name Burttdavya and in numerous specific epithets including Aloe davyana, Acacia davyi, Hibiscus burtt-davyi and Ficus burtt-davyi. A stone bench was erected in Shotover Country Park shortly after his death in his memory. This botanist is denoted by the author abbreviation Burtt Davy when citing a botanical name.

== Bibliography ==
- Stock Ranges of Northwestern California: Notes on the Grasses and Forage Plants and Range Conditions - Joseph Burtt Davy, 1903.
- Vernacular and Botanical Names of some South African Plants – Burtt Davy, Transvaal Agricultural Journal, April 1904
- Ferns of the Transvaal – Burtt Davy & V. G. Crawley, Report of the SA Association for the Advancement of Science, 1909
- A First Checklist of Flowering Plants and Ferns of the Transvaal and Swaziland – Burtt Davy & Mrs R. Leendertz Pott, Annals of the Tvl. Museum, 1912
- Maize: its History, Cultivation, Handling and Uses with Special Reference to South Africa – Burtt Davy, London, 1914
- A Manual of the Flowering Plants and Ferns of the Transvaal with Swaziland – Burtt Davy : Longmans, Green & Co., 1932
