= Hoffmannanthus =

Scientific classification
- Kingdom: Plantae
- Clade: Tracheophytes
- Clade: Angiosperms
- Clade: Eudicots
- Clade: Asterids
- Order: Asterales
- Family: Asteraceae
- Subfamily: Cichorioideae
- Tribe: Vernonieae
- Genus: Hoffmannanthus; H.Rob., S.C.Keeley & Skvarla
- Species: H. abbotianus

Binomial name
- Hoffmannanthus abbotianus (O.Hoffm.) H.Rob., S.C.Keeley & Skvarla

Synonyms
- Vernonia abbotiana O.Hoffm.; Vernonia brachycalyx O.Hoffm.; Vernonia hoffmanniana S.Moore; Vernonia jodopappa Chiov.; Vernonia jodopapposa Chiov. ex Lanza; Vernonia meiocalyx S.Moore

Genus of flowering plants

Hoffmannanthus is a monotypic genus of flowering plants in the Asteraceae (sunflower family). There is only one known species, Hoffmannanthus abbotianus (O.Hoffm.) H.Rob., S.C.Keeley & Skvarla Its native range is Uganda and southern Tropical Africa. It is found in the countries of Angola, Kenya, Tanzania, Uganda, Zambia and Zaïre.

== Description ==
They are scrambling shrubs with slender stems which has solid pith (insides). They are somewhat deflected at the nodes in upper part of the plant and near the inflorescence or flowers. The stems have L-shaped hairs. The leaves are alternate (different levels along a stem), the petioles (leaf stalks) are slender and 7–15 mm long, below the basal acumination of blade. The blades of the leaf are ovate, 6–7 times longer than petiole, 5–10 cm (2–4 in) long and 1.5–5 cm (1–2 in) wide. The base of the leaf is broadly obtuse to short-acute and narrowly acuminate at petiole. The margins are partially denticulate to nearly entire, with the apex being scarcely to gradually acuminate. The surface (of the leaf) is pilosulous (hairy) and has glandular dots. The hairs are sparser above and dense on larger veins on the leaf. The secondary veins are pinnate, with about 6 weak secondary veins on each side of midrib, spreading at close to 40-45° angles. The flowers or inflorescences are broadly corymbiform, with long branches which are mostly with small or insignificant bracteoles at the bases. The peduncles are 2–30 mm long. The flower heads are campanulate (bell-like) with the involucre much shorter than florets at maturity. The involucral bracts are in 2–3 series, persistent, oblong-lanceolate shaped, with acute to short-acuminate tips, puberulous (covered in hairs) on the outside. They are pale at the base, with the midvein being broadly greenish in colour. It is percurrent at the tip, with lateral margins thinly membranous and the receptacle scarcely convex, epaleate (naked) and epilose (without hairs). There are about 15 florets in a flowerhead, which are homogamous (having the stamens and pistils) and bisexual. The corollas are violet to purple, narrowly funnel-form, with a long basal tube and short throat. The lobes are narrowly oblong-lanceolate shaped, with glandular dots on the outside. The anthers have triangular apical appendages. The base of the style is slightly enlarged and the style shaft is glabrous (smooth, lacking hairs or scales). There are sweeping hairs on the style branches, which are elongated with rounded or blunt tips. The achenes (fruit or seed capsule) is 5-angled, with some glandular dots and short setulae (small hairs), and inner layer with small sub-quadrate or rounded raphids (needles). The pappus (a tuft or ring of hairs or scales) is pale to sordid or rufous, 2 series, inner pappus of many capillary bristles that are slightly broader in distal half, outer pappus of short narrow scales. The pollen grains were measure under a microscope to be 40 μm in diameter. Its chromosome count was 2n = 20.

== Taxonomy ==
The genus name of Hoffmannanthus is in honour of Karl August Otto Hoffmann (1853–1909), a South African botanist, and the Latin specific epithet of abbotianus refers to Mr. Abbot who originally collected the plant in 1890. It was then named Vernonia abbotiana O. Hoffm. in Bot. Jahrb. Syst. Vol.20 on page 221 in 1894. The collected type specimen of Vernonia abbotiana O. Hoffm. was destroyed in Berlin during the Second World War. In 1999, the genus of plants Vernonia Schreb. from the Old World was investigated by H. Robinson. Pollen specimens examined were from the U.S. National Herbarium in Washington, DC. under a microscope, also DNA sequencing of plant material was also carried out. It found differences and the genus Hoffmannanthus and its species were removed from the Vernonia genus. Both the genus and species were then first described and published in PhytoKeys Vol.39 on page 58 in 2014.
