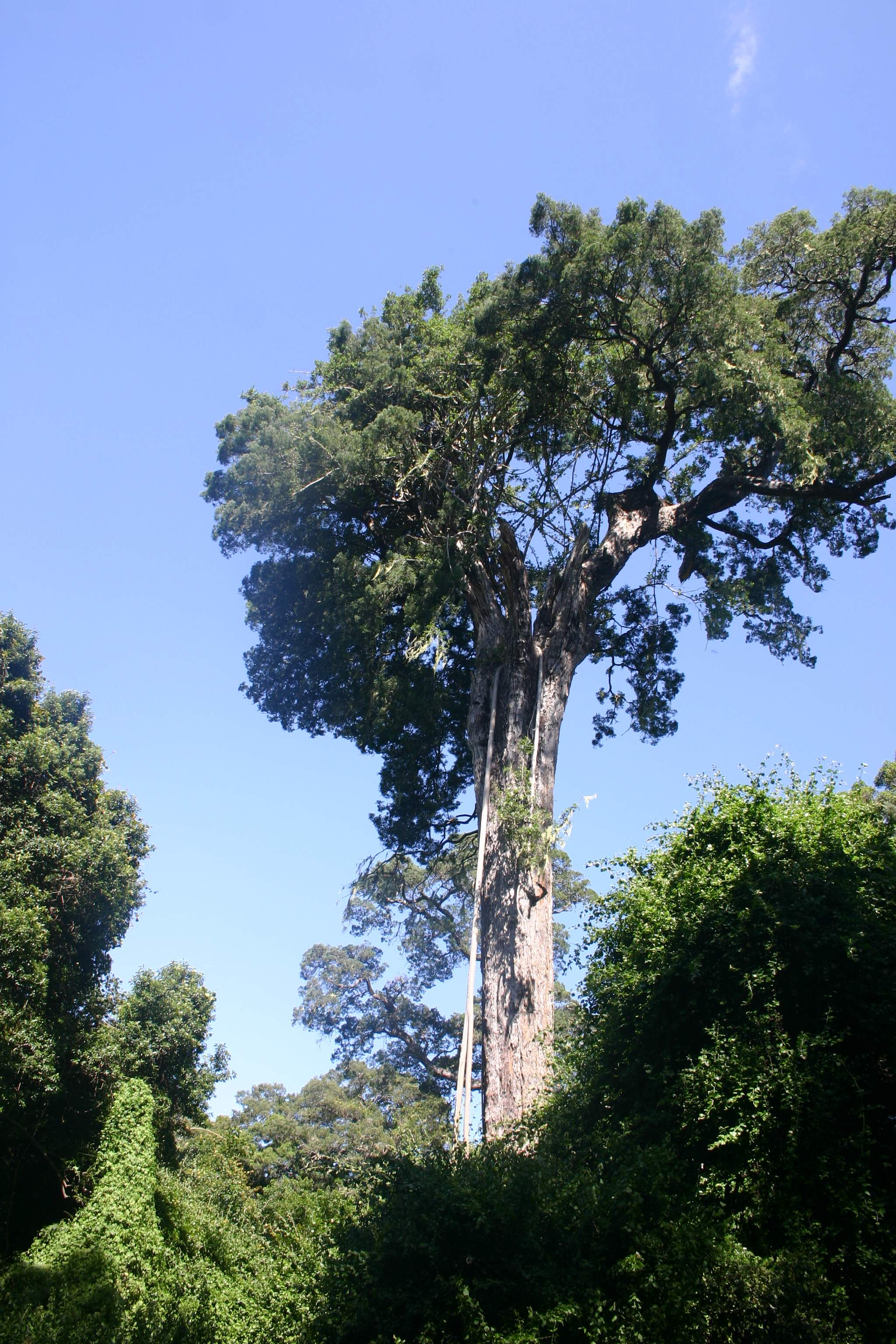
- Ficus burtt-davyi growing on Afrocarpus falcatus

Conservation status
- Least Concern (IUCN 3.1)

Scientific classification
- Kingdom: Plantae
- Clade: Tracheophytes
- Clade: Angiosperms
- Clade: Eudicots
- Clade: Rosids
- Order: Rosales
- Family: Moraceae
- Genus: Ficus
- Subgenus: F. subg. Urostigma
- Species: F. burtt-davyi

Binomial name
- Ficus burtt-davyi Hutch.

Synonyms
- Ficus natalensis var. minor (Sond.) Warb.; Ficus natalensis var. puberula Warb.; Urostigma natalense var. minor Sond.

= Ficus burtt-davyi =

Species of fig from Southern Africa

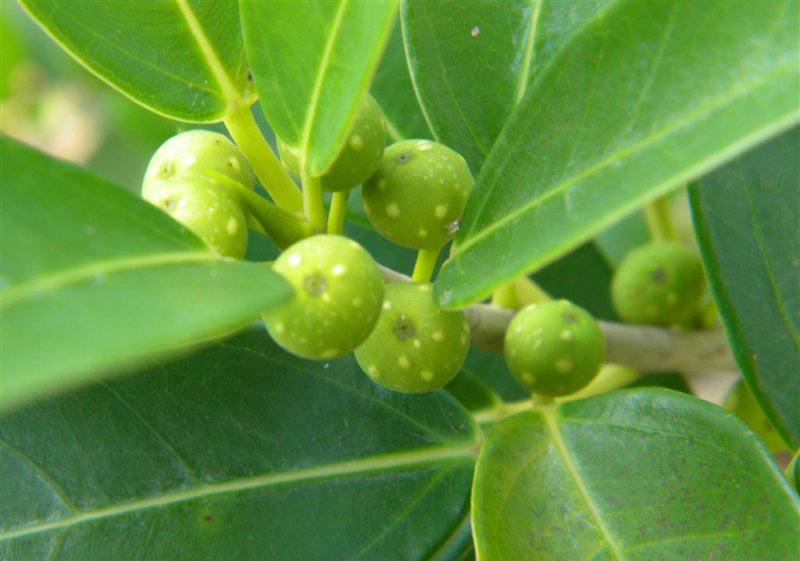

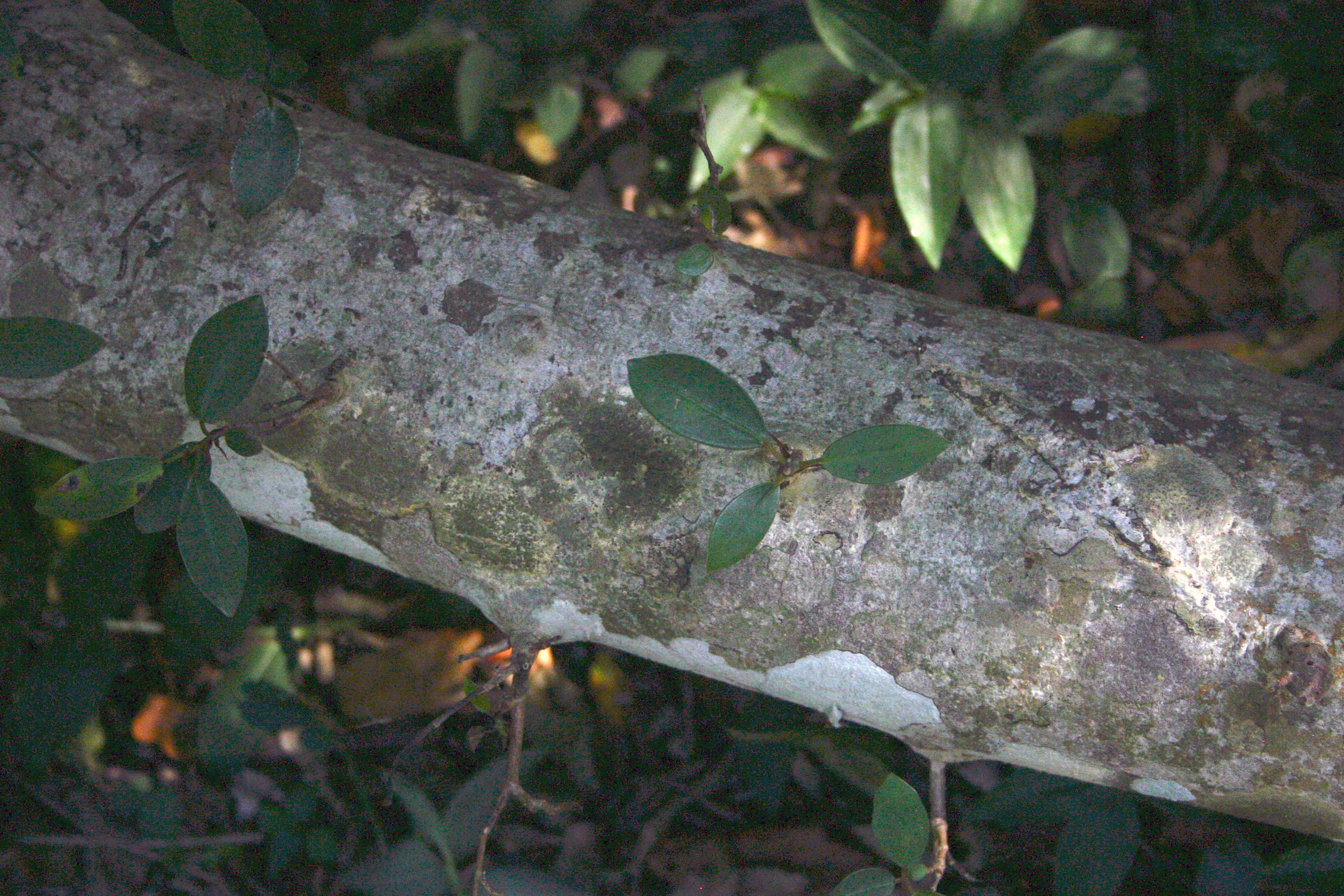

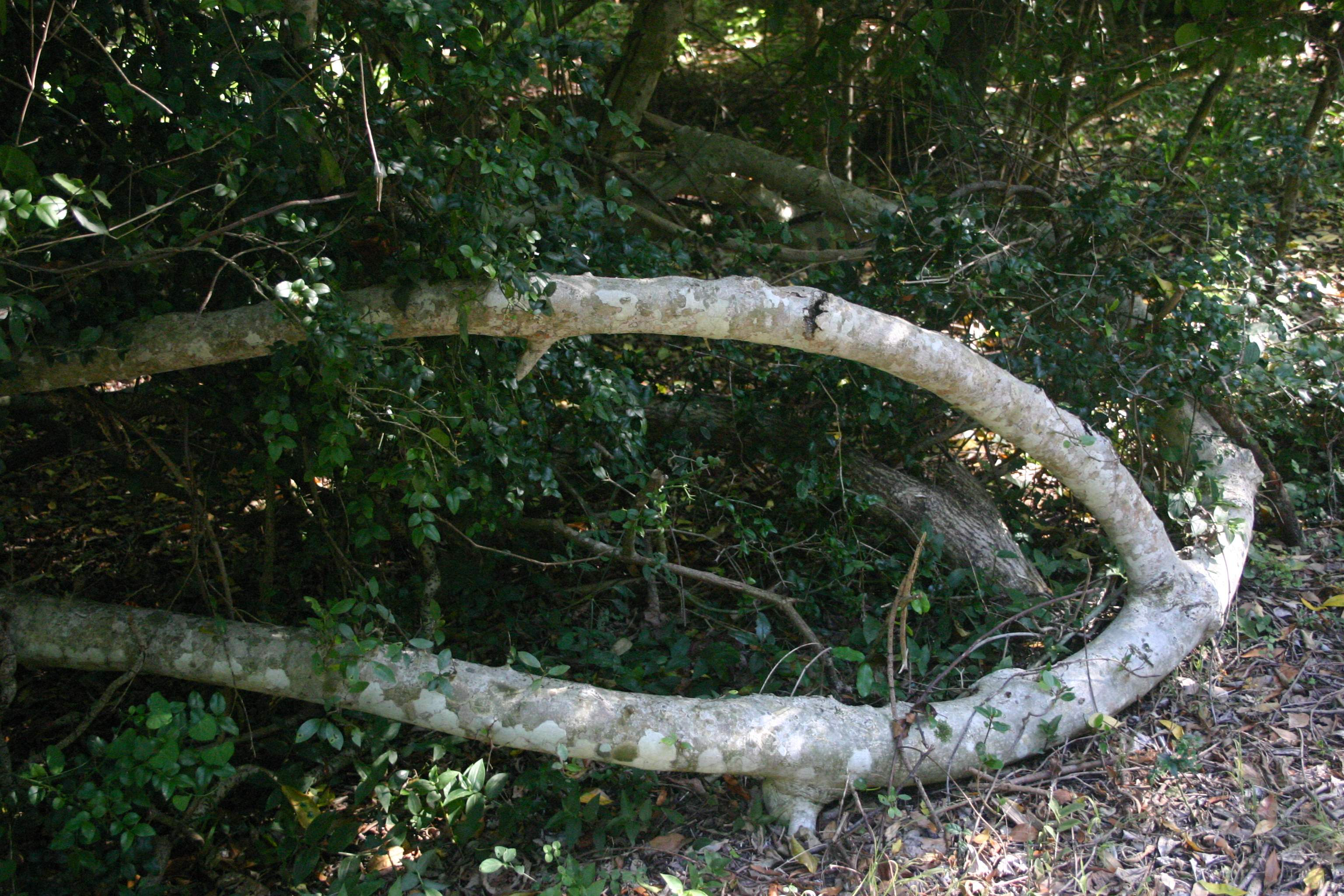

Ficus burtt-davyi is a fig species endemic to Southern Africa, belonging to the Mulberry family of Moraceae. It grows in coastal and inland forests up to 1,500 m (4,920 ft), from the vicinity of Mossel Bay in the Southern Cape to southern Mozambique - the forms growing on coastal dunes in the northern part of its range are salt tolerant and form low thickets on the margins of woodland. In the southern and eastern Cape forests the species becomes a strangler or liana, while when found on rocky outcrops and cliffs it usually develops into a rock-splitter.

In its epiphytic form this species starts its life in the forks of tree branches, where an accumulation of organic debris aids germination and initial development. It sends down long, thin roots to reach soil and water below. The roots thicken and grow in number with the passage of time, and can eventually enclose the supporting tree, strangling and killing it, leaving the fig to stand alone with no competition for resources. Growing without support the stems may reach 1m in diameter, and up to 20m in height, with a dense canopy and making an excellent shade tree. Bark is thin, smooth, grey and fibrous, and is much used by indigenous tribes as rough cordage. Branchlets are covered with minute, soft, erect hairs. Its tolerance of drought conditions makes it a favourite species among Bonsai growers. Fruits are important as both food and in traditional medicine, and contain laxative substances, flavonoids, sugars, vitamins A and C, acids and enzymes. The latex is an allergen and serious eye irritant.

There are some 900 species of figs worldwide, each employing the same remarkable manner of pollination where, with rare exceptions, each species of fig relying on one particular species of fig wasp from the family Agaonidae to carry out the fertilisation. F. burtt-davyi is no exception to the rule and depends on the minute fig wasp Elisabethiella baijnathi Wiebes. to effect this. Pollinator-specific volatile attractants are released through the ostioles of ripe figs and in the case of F. burtt-davyi attract only adult female Elisabethiella baijnathi. Fig trees are keystone species in many tropical and subtropical ecosystems. Due to their steady production of fruit throughout the year, they feed a wide spectrum of animal life, and are repaid by animals' dispersing their seeds. Fruits are green with white spots when immature, yellowish when ripe, growing singly or in pairs from leaf axils, 5-10mm in diameter.

Fourcade described the wood as "very light and soft, very weak, elastic, porous, with alternate concentric layers of soft and firm tissue; medullary rays fine and close; pores moderately large and numerous, irregularly distributed; colour white or grey, tinged with brown; makes rough boards, but decays rapidly if exposed to the weather."

The species was named in honour of the botanist Joseph Burtt Davy, who worked in South Africa between 1903 and 1919.

== Synonyms ==
- Ficus natalensis var. puberula Warb. in Viert. Nat. Ges. Zürich 51: 142 (1906). Type from S. Africa.
- Ficus natalensis var. minor (Sond.) Warb. in Viert. Nat. Ges. Zürich 51: 142 (1906).
- Urostigma natalense var. minor Sond. in Linnaea 23: 137 (1850). Lectotype from S. Africa, chosen by Berg in Fl. Gabon 26: 173 (1984).

== Bibliography ==
- Figs Of Southern And South-Central Africa - John & Sandra Burrows, Umdaus Press, Pretoria (2003) ISBN 9781919766256
