= Karl August Otto Hoffmann =

German botanist (1853–1909)

Karl August Otto Hoffmann (25 October 1853 in Beeskow – 11 September 1909) was a German botanist and a high school teacher in Berlin. Author of Sertum plantarum madagascariensium, the genus Hoffmanniella in the family Asteraceae was named after him by Rudolf Schlechter. The plant genus of Hoffmannanthus (also in the family of Asteraceae was named after him in 2014.

He studied mathematics and natural history at the University of Berlin, later performing graduate studies at the University of Göttingen. Beginning in 1877, he taught classes at the Friedrichswerdersches Gymnasium in Berlin. He died in September 1909, following an operation for appendicitis. He donated his impressive herbarium to the Berlin Herbarium.

With Georg Carl Wilhelm Vatke, he processed botanical specimens collected by Johann Maria Hildebrandt in Madagascar. He also worked with the Madagascar collections of Christian Rutenberg and the botanical specimens collected by Friedrich Wilhelm Alexander von Mechow and Julius Eduard Teusz in the interior of Angola.

He is best known for his investigations of the family Asteraceae, of which he is the binomial author of many species. He provided analyses of Asteraceae specimens collected by Auguste Chevalier in Africa and by Per Karl Hjalmar Dusén in Patagonia and Tierra del Fuego. He made major contributions in Engler and Prantl's Die Natürlichen Pflanzenfamilien involving Asteraceae (806 genera).
