= Johann Daniel von Reitter =

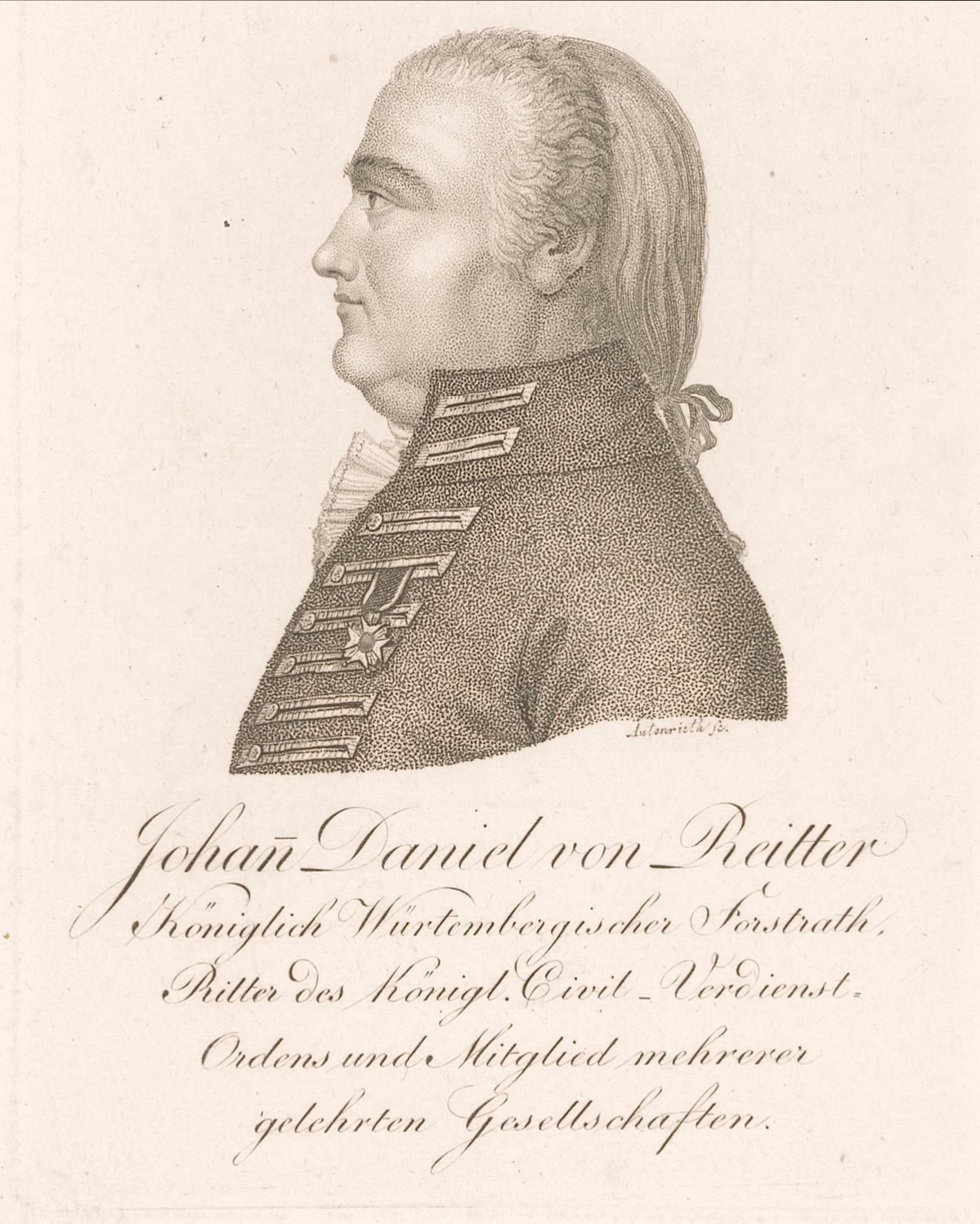

Johann Daniel von Reitter (21 October 1759 – 6 February 1811) was a German forester, hunter, educator, and botanist who worked in the court of the rulers of Württemberg.

Reitter was born in Böblingen (Württemberg) where his father was a forester. He went to a local grammar school before entering a military school in 1772, an idea suggested by Duke Karl of Württemberg, who had met the boy while hunting. He studied natural sciences and even as a student wrote a treatise on the protection of game reserves. In 1779 he became a gunsmith for the Duke and in 1780 he was a court hunter and two years later he was involved in forestry education for hunters and game wardens at the Leibjäger in Hohenheim. He travelled in France and the Netherlands to study forestry practices. He founded the Journal für das Forst- und Jagdwesen (Journal for Forestry and Hunting) along with others in 1790. Other periodicals of the period were run by so-called forest cameralists while Reitter's journal dealt with actual forest management practices. In 1794 he became a forestry commissioner in Stuttgart and later became a forest councillor. In 1803 he was a council member in a newly formed forestry department. He published illustrated books on German trees with illustrations by Gottlieb Friedrich Abel. He continued forestry education work until 1807 and this was continued by Georg Ludwig Hartig.
