= Richard Ernest Kunze =

American physician

Richard Ernest Kunze (b. in Altenburg, Germany, 7 April 1838; d. 1919) was a physician. He came to the United States in 1854, and was graduated at the Eclectic Medical College of New York in 1868, subsequently becoming a member of the board of trustees of this institution, was president of the New York Therapeutical Association in 1880, introduced to the medical profession various drugs derived from cacti, and added greatly to the previous knowledge of medical botany. He published a series of monographs on Cactus (Albany, 1875); Cereus Grandiflorus and Cereus bonplandi (1876); Cereus triangularis and Phyllocactus grandis (1876); Cardinal Points in the Study of Medical Botany (New York, 1881); and The Germination and Vitality of Seeds (1881).

In 1900, he was collecting cacti, mainly around Phoenix, Arizona, for the Haage nursery. At least two species of cactus were named after him, Grusonia kunzei and Mammillaria kunzeana. He also wrote a paper on medical entomology.
