= Muharram Rasulova =

Tajikistani botanist (1926–2006)

Muharram Rasulovna Rasulova
- Муҳаррам Расуловна Расулова
- Born: 17 June 1926; Khujand
- Died: 2006 (aged 79–80)
- Awards: Honorary Order of the Presidium of the Supreme Soviet of Tajikistan
- Scientific career
- Institutions: Botanical Institute of the Tajik SSR
- Author abbrev. (botany): Rassulova

Muharram Rasulovna Rasulova (Tajik: Муҳаррам Расуловна Расулова) (17 June 1926 – 2006) was a Tajikistani botanist, active during the Soviet era.

Rasulova was born into a working-class family in Khujand. From 1941 to 1943 she worked as a laboratory assistant at a cotton factory in the same city, then called Leninabad. It was in the latter year that she began her higher studies; in 1945 she became a laboratory assistant at the Women's Pedagogical Institute, where in 1947 she became a lecturer and senior instructor in the Department of Geography. In 1951, the same year in which she joined the Communist Party of the Soviet Union, she began postgraduate studies, which continued until 1958. She later became a scientific worker, and beginning in 1958 took over the directorship of the Department of Flora and Taxonomy at the Botanical Institute of the Tajik SSR. In 1981 she became a member of the Tajikistan Academy of Sciences. Rasulova's research dealt with the flora and taxonomy of plant life in Tajikistan, as well as with its geography. She created botanical descriptions for over thirty varieties of bean. Among her writings was The One-Year Old Tajik Bean Determinant (Dushanbe, 1967). For her work, Rasulova was awarded the Honorary Order of the Presidium of the Supreme Soviet of Tajikistan.
