= Reino Pott =

South African botanist (1869 – 1965)

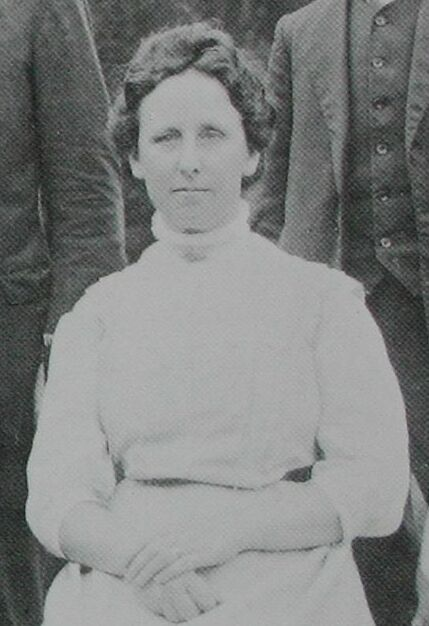
- Born: 2 January 1869; Medemblik, Noord Holland, Netherlands
- Died: 14 June 1965; Pretoria, South Africa
- Known for: First woman civil servant in the South African Republic
- Scientific career
- Fields: Botany
- Institutions: Transvaal Museum
- Author abbrev. (botany): R.Pott

Reino Pott née Leendertz (2 January 1869 – 14 June 1965) was a Dutch-born South African botanist and chemist. She was the first woman to be appointed as a botanist in the civil service of the South African Republic, and greatly expanded the plant collection of the Transvaal Museum. She later co-authored a list of over 3,000 species of flowering plants and ferns with Joseph Burtt Davy in 1912, expanding it to over 4,000 in 1920.

== Biography ==
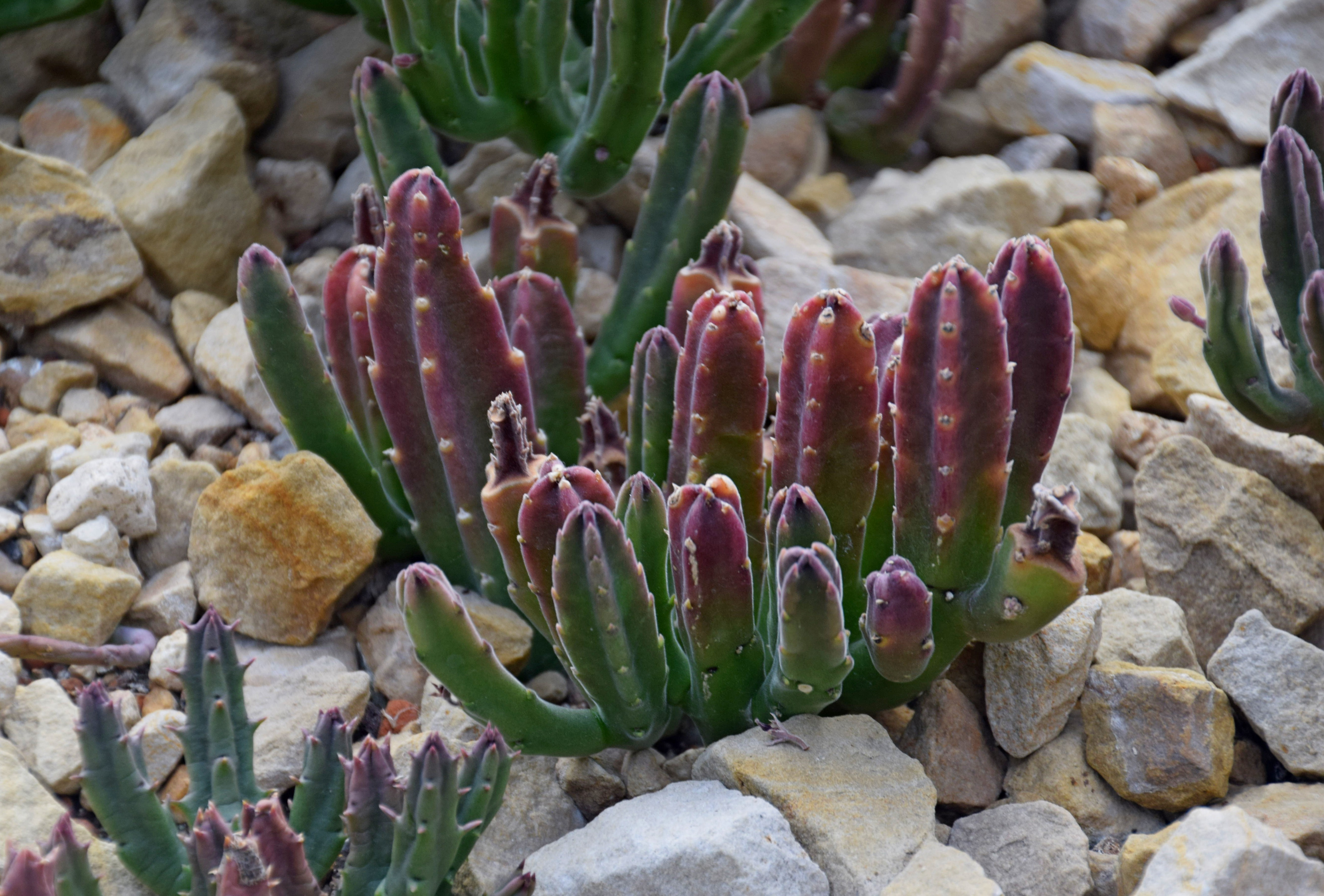
Stapelia leendertziae

=== Academics ===
Pott first studied as a pharmacist, but would go on to study botany in Amsterdam under Hugo de Vries. By 1898, she had completed her studies and traveled to Pretoria.

=== Career in South Africa ===
In the same year she arrived in Pretoria, 1898, Pott was appointed to the post of botanical assistant at the Transvaal Museum, then called the Staatsmuseum, as the first exception to the established rule at the time of employing only men as scientists in the South African Republic. From then on, she worked to establish a representative sample of the Transvaal flora in the Museum. This work included an expansion of plant specimens that numbered more than 23,000 by the end of her retirement.

Pott returned to the Netherlands during the Second Boer War and taught natural history at a girls' high school, but would re-apply for work at the Transvaal Museum and return to the South African Republic on 1 January 1904.

Pott became a member of the South African Association for the Advancement of Science in 1906, and would present a draft of a list of the Transvaal and Swaziland regions' vascular plants to the Association in 1908, in collaboration with Joseph Burtt Davy. This list would be finalized in 1912, with Pott listed as a co-author; her addendum published in 1920 would list her as the sole author.

Pott discovered several new species of flowering plant throughout her career, including several succulents in the genus Stapelia. Among these were Stapelia leendertziae, or "Black Bells", which was named in her honor by N. E. Brown, and Stapelia gettleffii, which she discovered in 1913. She retired in 1925.
