= Raleigh Black =

Scottish-born Australian botanist

- Born: 11 March 1880; Bothwell, Tasmania
- Died: 2 July 1963 (aged 83); Mont Albert, Victoria
- Known for: Plant collecting
- Scientific career
- Fields: Botany
- Author abbrev. (botany): R.A.Black

Raleigh Adelbert Black (11 March 1880 – 2 July 1963) was an Australian botanist and public servant best known for his large private herbarium, most of which is housed at the National Herbarium of Victoria. His collection of Tasmanian plants is considered one of the largest and most representative collections of Tasmanian flora from the first half of the twentieth century.

== Early life ==
Black was born in Bothwell, Tasmania, the son of Rev. Dr Joseph Black who was an immigrant from Aberdeen, Scotland. Raleigh fell from a swing as a young child and suffered a head injury. After this, while physically strong, he complained of headaches. He was rebellious and difficult to handle at home and school so his parents took him to a doctor, who suggested he would be better suited to work than school. At the age of twelve, Black began working for the Tasmanian News as a printer's devil, then bookbinder and eventually as a typesetter. Still in his teens, he worked as a clerical assistant for the Treasury Department of the Tasmanian Government and developed an excellent memory by taking a mail-order memory training course through the New York Institute of Science.

Showing interest in natural history from an early age, Black gained a good reputation as an amateur entomologist after making a collection of Tasmanian beetles. His collection caught the attention of the Under-Treasurer, who asked him to work with government entomologist Arthur Mills Lea to investigate the prevalence of San Jose scale in Tasmanian orchards. He travelled for three months surveying every orchard in Tasmania and then he was given a permanent position with the Tasmanian Council of Agriculture, now known as the Department of Primary Industries, Water and Environment.

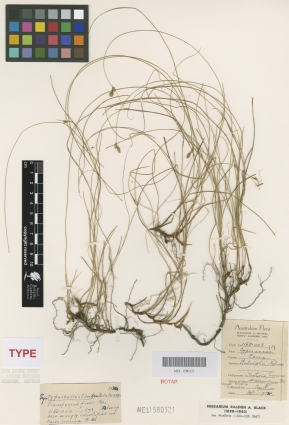
Syntype of Carex raleighii Nelmes (MEL 1580321), collected by R.A. Black at Cobungra, Victoria.

== Botanical career ==
Around 1900, Black sought to improve his knowledge of Tasmanian Flora and requested the guidance of government botanist Leonard Rodway. Rodway agreed and was glad to teach him everything he knew, and Black was a dedicated student.

Working for the Council of Agriculture and in various other roles as a public servant afforded Black the opportunity to travel throughout Tasmania and, making use of his new knowledge of the flora, he collected plant specimens. While collecting plants was not part of his job description, he took advantage of his travels and amassed a large collection of Tasmanian plants representing a wide range of taxa from different ecosystems.

Black was an original member, treasurer and later vice-president of the Tasmanian Field Naturalist’s Club.

He moved to Sydney in 1926 and worked for Christian Bjelke-Petersen at the Bjelke-Petersen School of Physical Culture and then moved to Melbourne in 1931 during the depression. In Melbourne he worked for a chemical company distributing fertilisers around north-eastern Victoria and the Upper Murray region of New South Wales, which provided another valuable opportunity to collect plants.

During this time he focused on collecting grasses, sedges and rushes, mostly around the central highlands of Victoria and other ranges into New South Wales. These collections proved valuable and many of the specimens he collected were new to science.

== Standard author abbreviation ==
The standard author abbreviation R.A.Black is used to indicate this person as the author when citing a botanical name.

== Legacy ==
=== R. A. Black Herbarium ===
In 1952 Raleigh A. Black estimated his herbarium included approximately 15,000 specimens, with around 9,000 numbered sheets and about 6,000 duplicates. The collection is systematically organised, with diligently recorded information on handwritten labels, and unique reference numbers for every collection object relating to a card catalogue to easily find species. Most of the specimens collected by Black are from Tasmania though some are from north-eastern Victoria and south-eastern New South Wales.

Also included in the R.A. Black herbarium are specimens exchanged with botanists and collectors from elsewhere in Australia and the world, including Stanley Thatcher Blake (Queensland), Bernard Boivin (Canada), Agnes Chase (U.S.A.), Rev. G. Holmes (Kimberley), and Charles Edward Hubbard (U.K.).

Black began negotiating the sale of his herbarium in 1946, first with the Arnold Arboretum and then Royal Botanic Gardens, Kew but it was deemed important to keep the specimens in Australia. It was eventually sold to the National Herbarium of Victoria in August 1957 for £300.

The R. A. Black herbarium includes 36 type specimens. Around 7,000 specimens collected by Black are databased at the National Herbarium of Victoria and are available through the Australasian Virtual Herbarium.

=== Notable Species ===
- Eucalyptus ×radiodives R.A.Black is a rare hybrid of Eucalyptus dives Schauer and Eucalyptus radiata Sieber ex DC. described by Black in The Victorian Naturalist, from a specimen he collected near Mansfield.
- Black collected a specimen near Mount Hotham that was designated the type of Carex raleighii Nelmes and the species was named in his honour.
