= Ernest Rupin =

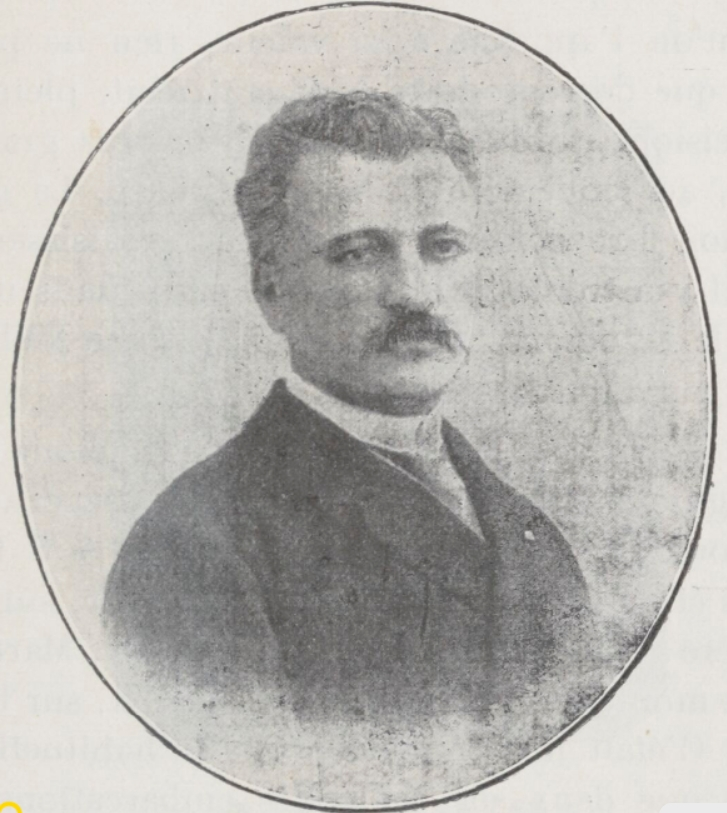

Ernest Jean-Baptiste Rupin (6 May 1845 – 24 October 1909) was a French botanist, archaeologist, speleologist and photographer. He established the municipal museum in his home town of Brive-la-Gaillarde and served as its first curator.

Rupin was born in a wealthy family in Brive and went to study law as well as fine arts at Toulouse. He took an interest in botany and anthropology as well. He worked as a receiver in his hometown. He married Joséphine Marie Augustine Mage who came from one of the wealthiest families in 1874 and this led to his decision of resigning from his work in 1874. From 1875 to 1878 he spent time travelling around Corrèze, meeting artists, scientists, and photographing. He also collected botanical specimens and took an interest in excavations at various historic sites. He established a society for science, history and archaeology of Corrèze in 1878 and served as its president from 1881 to 1903. The society also established a Brive museum in 1878 and he became its first curator on 14 June 1884. He worked there until his death and in the 1980s it was moved to Labenche Hotel and renamed as the Ernst Rupin Museum.
