= Lester Gertrude Ellen Rowntree =

American botanist, botanical collector, taxonomist and explorer

Lester Gertrude Ellen Rowntree (1879–1979), a renowned field botanist and horticulturalist, was a pioneer in the study, propagation, and conservation of California native plants. In numerous journal and magazine articles, books, and public lectures, she shared her extensive knowledge of wildflowers and shrubs while arguing tirelessly for their protection.

A self-proclaimed “lady-gypsy”, Rowntree spent most of each year doing fieldwork in California and the West while living outdoors, believing that the only way to know native plants was to live with them for weeks at a time in their natural surroundings. Because of her reputation as a field botanist, Rowntree has been compared favorably to David Douglas, the 19th century British botanist who first documented western North American flora. Joan Parry Dutton writes: “There are striking similarities between Lester Rowntree and David Douglas. In fact, Lester could be Douglas’ plant-wise and spiritual descendant [for] Lester's knowledge of California wild flowers is unrivaled; it is safe she knows more about them than Douglas ever knew. "

== Biography ==
Born Gertrude Ellen Lester to a Quaker family in Penrith, England, she spent the first ten years of her life in the picturesque landscape of the Lakes District, nurturing a deep appreciation of nature and an outdoor life. In 1889 Lester’s family relocated to the United States, to a homestead in Kansas where two of her siblings died because of a contaminated water supply. After these disastrous two years in Kansas the Lester family moved to a Quaker community near Los Angeles; it was here that Lester first became acquainted with the California wildflowers that became her life’s passion. Although Lester attended high school at Westtown outside of Philadelphia, and settled originally in New Jersey after marriage to Bernard Rowntree (also of a Quaker family) in 1908, and where their only child, Cedric Rowntree, was born in 1911, they relocated back to southern California in 1920, and then to the Carmel Highlands (a few miles south of Carmel itself) in 1925. There, on property overlooking the Pacific, Lester began her career with native plants. By 1930 she owned a business, Lester Rowntree & Company in Carmel, Ca. which sold wildflower seeds to gardeners across the country. She never gathered seeds in the wild to sell directly but took just enough wild-seed to propagate seed stock in her garden. Domestic matters, however, suffered and in 1931 Lester and Bernard divorced; Lester moved up the hill above the coastal pine forest where she built a small wooden house and nursery on several acres that became her garden and home base until her death in 1979, five days after her 100th birthday.

== Writing ==
Lester Rowntree was a talented and prolific writer, authoring two well-received books on native plants and shrubs, four children’s books, and over 700 magazine, newspaper, and journal articles. A full bibliography of her writings is found as an appendix in the 2006 reprinting of “Hardy Californians”.

A sample of Rowntree's lively prose follows, taken from her article “The Lone Hunter” published in the June 1939 issue of The Atlantic Monthly. “It took adversity to bring me the sort of life I have always longed for. Not until after my domestic happiness had gone to smash did I realize that I was free to trek up and down the long state of California, and to satisfy my insistent curiosity about plants, to find them in their homes meeting their days and seasons, to write down their tricks and manners in my notebook, to photograph their flowers, to collect their seeds, to bring home seedlings in cans just emptied of tomato juice. “ I didn't take up this for the poetry of it. I had no ambition to become a picturesque Lady-Gypsy. I honestly wanted to find out about California wild flowers. There was little written about them in their habitats and nothing at all about their behavior in the garden, so I made it my job to discover the facts for myself.... "I inhabit my hillside only from November to February, while the winter storms are blowing and the winter rains pouring. In March and April I have long shining days on the desert, in May happy weeks in the foothills, where a chorus of robins wakes me and my morning bath is in a rushing stream of just-melted snow. In June I am in the northern counties scented with new-mown hay and wild strawberries. In July in the higher mountains, and in August and September up in the alpine zone with mule or burro.”

== Legacy ==
Writer and horticulturalist Judith Larner Lowry comments on Rowntree's legacy: “Today, it would be hard to find a professional in the field of native plant horticulture who was not, at some point, inspired by Lester Rowntree. The model of her double focus, wildland exploration and landscape use of plants, is followed by numerous California native plant horticulturists, from arboretum directors to landscapers to nursery professionals, who make regular trips into the wild for the pleasure of observing plants in their homes and to collect seeds and cuttings for propagation.”

== Notes and references ==
- Barker, Philip A. “A Visit with Lester Rowntree.” American Horticultural Magazine 44. No 1 (January 1965): 32–35
- Begg, Virginia Lopez. “As Thrilling as Any Western Romance.” Pacific Horticulture 55, no 2 (1994): 16–18.
- Brandt, Cora R. “Lester Rowntree: Denizen of the Mountains.” Journal of the California Horticultural Society 14. No 1 (January 1955): 8–17.
- Donlon, Rosemary. “Lester Rowntree.” Manzanita (Summer 1988): 8–9.
- Dutton, Joan Parry. Enjoying America's Gardens. New York: Reynal. 1958.
- Hamann, Skee. “Lester Rowntree, Mountain Mystic.” Journal of the California Horticultural Society 35, no 2 (1974): 73–76
- Hamann, Skee. “The Seed Collector.” The Countryman (Summer 1974): 160-162
- Hamann, Skee. “The Wildflower Lover at Ninety-Seven.” Fremontia 3, no 4 (January 1976): 3–8
- Ingram, Marie. “Lester Rowntree (1879-1979). Part One: The Peripatetic Gilbert White.” Hortus 8, no 3 (1994): 2–81.
- Ingram, Marie. “Lester Rowntree (1879-1979). Part Two: Sanctuary---Conserving the Worthwhile.” Hortus 8, no 4 (1994): 81–96.
- Ingram, Marie. “Lester Rowntree (1879-1979). Part Three: A Spirit of Keen Joy.” Hortus 9, no 1 (1995) 69–87.
- Levenson, Rosemary. "Lester Rowntree: California Native Plant Woman." Regional Oral History Office, Bancroft Library, University of California. 1979. 344 pages.
- Lowry, Judith L. “Lester Rowntree’s Horticultural Legacy.” Hardy Californians: A Women's Life with Native Plants. New, Expanded Edition. Lester B. Rowntree, editor. University of California Press. 2006. xlvii-lxxiv
- Lowry, Judith L. “Supreme Advocate for California Native Plants: Lester Rowntree.” The Landscaping Ideas of Jays. University of California Press. 2007. 78–91.
- O’Conner, Natalie G. “Plantsmen in Profile. XI: Lester Rowntree.” Baileya. 11, no. 2 (June 1963): 53.
- O’Grady, Sean. “Lester Rowntree: Vernacular Natural Historian”. Interdisciplinary Studies in Literature and Environment. Spring 1993/ v 1 no 1, pp. 97–105
- Pearce, F. Owen. “Lester Rowntree.” Bulletin of the Alpine Rock Garden Society 35, no 1 (Winter 1980): 13–19.
- Rowntree, Lester. "Lone Hunter." Atlantic Monthly. 1939 163. 809–16.
- Rowntree, Lester B. and Rowan A. Rowntree. “About Lester.” Hardy Californians: A Women's Life with Native Plants. New, Expanded Edition. University of California Press. Lester B. Rowntree, editor. 2006. xv–xlvi
- Woolfenden, John. “Lester Rowntree.” Journal of the California Horticultural Society 29, no.4 (October 1968): 98–126.
