= Christian Rutenberg =

German explorer and botanical collector

Diedrich Christian Rutenberg (11 June 1851, Bremen – 25 August 1878) was a German explorer and botanical collector.

He studied medicine and natural sciences at Jena and Heidelberg, where one of his instructors was Ernst Haeckel. In 1872, with Haeckel, he participated in scientific investigations in Montenegro and Dalmatia. After obtaining his medical doctorate (1875), he trained as an ophthalmologist and spent time as a military physician in Serbia.

In 1877, he journeyed to South Africa, collecting botanical specimens in Natal and Transvaal, then travelling to Mozambique, Mauritius and Madagascar. He collected specimens on the northwestern coast of Madagascar prior to crossing the island to the eastern side near the village of Beravi. At the age of 27, he was murdered by local inhabitants in Madagascar.

His specimens from Madagascar eventually came into the possession of Bremen botanist Franz Georg Philipp Buchenau, who issued a series of papers titled "Reliquiae Rutenbergianae". Here, he along with numerous other authors described Rutenberg's collections (605 total species, 5 new genera and 168 new species and varieties). The moss genus Rutenbergia is named after him.
