= Conly Rieder =

Cancer researcher

Conly Leroy Rieder
- Born: November 2, 1950 (age 76); Orange County, California
- Education: University of California, Irvine (bachelor's degree in biology in 1972), University of Oregon (Master of Science degree in 1975 and a Ph.D in 1977), University of Wisconsin-Madison (post-doctoral studies under Dr. Hans Ris )
- Occupation: Cancer researcher
- Spouse: Susan Nowogrodzki (m. 1979)
- Children: 2

Conly Leroy Rieder is a cancer researcher in the field of mitotic cellular division, the study of cell division processes and cancer pathology . He conducted research at the Wadsworth Center, part of the New York State Department of Health, in Albany, New York. His published literature has discussed chromosome motility, spindle assembly, and mitotic checkpoints.

== Professional life ==
=== Education and early career ===
Rieder enrolled at the University of California, Irvine as an undergraduate, initially intending to study forestry, but ultimately graduated with a bachelor's degree in biology in 1972. He attended the University of Oregon for graduate school and earned a Master of Science degree in 1975 and a Doctoral in 1977 under the guidance of Dr. Andrew Bajer. Following graduate school, he pursued post-doctoral studies under Dr. Hans Ris at the University of Wisconsin-Madison, focusing on high-power electron microscopy.

=== Work at the Wadsworth Center ===
In 1980, Rieder joined the New York State Department of Health and secured a tenureship within three years. He has authored over a hundred peer-reviewed research papers on cell division along with numerous contributions in various textbooks and encyclopedia articles.

As a cytologist, Rieder provided the first direct observation of microtubule capture by kinetochores in living cells, supporting the "search and capture" hypothesis of mitotic spindle assembly which was originally predicted by Mark Kirschner and Tim Mitchison in 1986. Rieder also proposed the concept of "polar wind", a force that ejects chromosome arms from the spindle. This hypothesis stems from laser experiments conducted in the 1990s and remains a concept widely accepted by the field.

Rieder also contributed to the development of the "spindle assembly checkpoint" (SAC) concept. He pioneered the idea that cells remain in mitosis until each chromosome becomes attached to the spindle, and only then mitotic exit is initiated. By using a laser to ablate kinetochores on individual chromosomes, he proved that the signal that delays mitotic progression is produced by kinetochores that lack attachment to spindle microtubules.

Rieder specialized in electron microscopy, serial sectioning, three-dimensional imaging of cells and correlative light and electron microscopy (CLEM), a technique that allows researchers to correlate dynamic cellular processes with high-resolution structural images.

Throughout his career, Rieder presented his work at scientific forums and collaborated with other leading researchers in the field. He has mentored scientists through their graduate and post-doctoral work. In January 2012, Rieder retired from the New York State Department of Health after a 32-year tenure.

=== Chromosome Research ===
Following his retirement from the Wadsworth Center, Rieder worked as editor-in-chief of Chromosome Research for eight years before retiring from this role.

== Personal life ==
Conly Rieder was born on November 2, 1950, in Orange County, California. He was the son of a World War II pilot and thus spent several years in Japan during his childhood. He also spent summers surfing in Southern California and fishing on Flathead Lake in Montana, experiences that later sparked his interest in nature. In the early 1970s, Rieder issued a marriage proposal to an unnamed woman that was rejected, which he later said helped his career trajectory.

In 1979, Rieder married Susan Nowogrodzki, a ceramicist, while working in Madison, Wisconsin. The couple has two daughters and currently live in Upstate New York.
