= Joseph Vachal =

French politician and entomologist

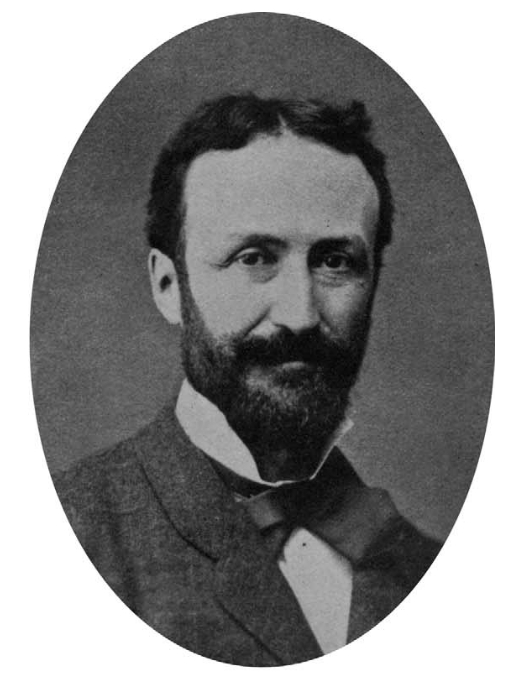
In 1877

Arthur Louis Marie Joseph Vachal (25 September 1838 – 31 January 1911) was a French politician and entomologist who studied the Hymenoptera. He described as many as 786 new species and 10 new genera making him the fifth most prolific describer of hymenopteran taxa.

== Life and work ==
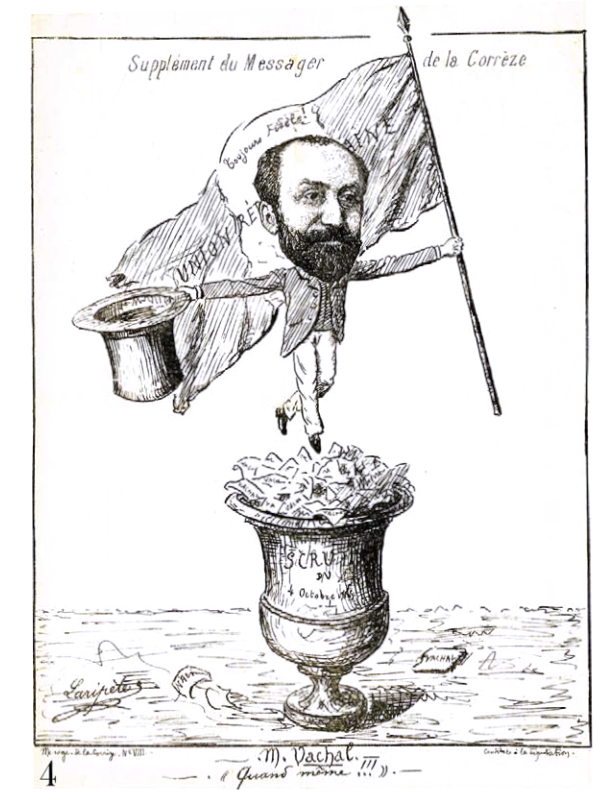
An election poster for Vachal from 1885

Vachal was born in Argentat, Corrèze in southern France, to Martial Vachal and Marie-Rose Roudier. He went to school in Tulle collège, Corrèze, and then to Paris at the Rollin collège (now collège-lycée Jacques-Decour). He then studied law and registered as a lawyer in Tulle. He then joined his father's notary firm in Argentat where he became “notaire honoraire” in 1884. He served as deputy for the Tulle region and in 1881 he became a member of the Gauche républicaine. In 1883 he was elected counsellor general for the Argentat canton. He was also elected for the Chamber of Deputies for the constituency of Tulle from 1881 to 1885. He took an interest in natural history and as a politician he took a special interest in reforestation, aquaculture and river management. He contributed to the work on the plants of Corrèze by Ernest Rupin (1884). He joined the French Entomological society in 1882 and began to collect hoverflies and hymenoptera. In 1899 he published a synoptic table of fishes. He offered specimens of hymenoptera for exchange around 1886 and from 1895 he began to specialize in the aculeate Hymenoptera and began to obtain specimens from Africa and Asia. He collaborated with museums to determine his specimens. From 1895, when Eugène Louis Bouvier (1856–1944) became the head of the entomology department in the Paris Museum, he and other amateurs were enabled to visit and work on the collections. He described 786 new species, erecting 10 new genera and a subgenus. Of these 412 new names were proposed of Halictidae, 136 Megachilidae, 135 Apidae, and 88 Colletidae. He was particularly interested in the genus Halictus and Megachile. After the death of Vachal, his son Jean Antoine Philippe Vachal gifted 150 boxes of specimens and his library to the Muséum National d'Histoire Naturelle, Paris.
