= List of botanists by author abbreviation (I–J) =

This is an incomplete list of botanists by their author abbreviation, which is designed for citation with the botanical names or works that they have published. This list follows that established by Brummitt & Powell (1992). Use of that list is recommended by Rec. 46A Note 1 of the International Code of Nomenclature for algae, fungi, and plants. The list is kept up to date online at The International Plant Names Index and Index Fungorum.

In some cases an "author abbreviation" consists of a full surname, while in other cases the surname is abbreviated and/or accompanied by one or more initials. There is no space between the initials and the surname (or its abbreviation).

==== Order of entries ====
The list here is maintained strictly in order of the alphabetic characters in the abbreviation; thus "A.B.Jacks." appears under "A" not "J", and is located as if the characters were "ABJACKS". Capitalization is ignored as are all non-alphabetic characters such as "." and space. Diacritical marks are also ignored, so that, e.g., "ü" is treated as if it were "u".

==== Navigation ====
Because of its length, the list is split across separate pages. All alphabetic sections can be accessed from the short table of contents; the vertical bars show the page divisions. Searching will only find an entry within a page.

== A–H ==
Contents:	A	B	C	D	E F	G	H	I J	K L	M	N O	P	Q R	S	T U V	W X Y Z

To find entries for A–H, use the table of contents above.

== I ==
Contents: Top	A	B	C	D	E F	G	H	I J	K L	M	N O	P	Q R	S	T U V	W X Y Z

- I.A.Abbott – Isabella Aiona Abbott (1919–2010)
- I.A.Pilát – Ignatz Anton Pilát (1820–1870)
- I.Baker – Irene Baker (1918–1989)
- I.Barua – Iswar Chandra Barua (born 1960)
- I.Bjørnstadt (also Nordal) – Inger Nordal (born 1944)
- Ickert-Bond – Stefanie M. Ickert-Bond (fl. 2001–2013)
- I.C.Martind. – Isaac Comly Martindale (1842–1893)
- I.C.Nielsen – Ivan Christian Nielsen (1946–2007)
- Ida – Reijiro Ida (fl. 1969)
- I.Deg. – Isa Degener (1924–2018)
- I.D.Illar. – Irina D. Illarionova (fl. 2008)
- Ietsw. – Jaan H. Ietswaart (born 1940)
- I.F.Lewis – Ivey Foreman Lewis (1882–1964)
- I.G.Stone – Ilma Grace Stone (1913–2001)
- I.Gut. – Rosa Ivonne Gutiérrez-Sánchez (fl. 2018)
- I.Hagen – Ingebrigt Severin Hagen (1852–1917)
- I.H.Boas – Isaac Herbert Boas (1878–1955)
- I.Hedberg – Inga Hedberg (1927–2024)
- I.I.Abramov – Ivan Ivanovich Abramov (1912–1990)
- Iinuma – Yokusai Iinuma (1782–1865)
- I.Keller – Ida Augusta Keller (1866–1932)
- Ikonn. – Sergei Sergeevich Ikonnikov (1931–2005)
- Ik.Takah. – Ikuro Takahashi (1892–1981)
- Iliff – James Iliff (1923–2014)
- Iljin – Modest Mikhaĭlovich Iljin (1889–1967)
- Iljinsk. – Irina Alekseevna Iljinskaja (1921–2011)
- I.Löw – Immanuel Löw (1854–1944)
- Iltis – Hugh Hellmut Iltis (1925–2016)
- Imbach – Emil J. Imbach (1897–1970)
- I.M.Haring – Inez M. Haring (1875–1968)
- I.M.Johnst. – Ivan Murray Johnston (1898–1960)
- I.M.Liddle – Iris M. Liddle (fl. 1995)
- Immelman – Kathleen Leonore Immelman (born 1955)
- I.M.Oliv. – Inge Magdalene Oliver (1947–2003)
- I.M.Turner – Ian Mark Turner (born 1963)
- Incarv. – Pierre Nicolas le Chéron (d')Incarville (1706–1757)
- Ingold – Cecil Terence Ingold (1905–2010)
- Ingram – Collingwood Ingram (1880–1981)
- Ingw. – Walter Edward Theodore Ingwersen (1885–1960)
- Inocencio – Cristina Inocencio (born 1969)
- Inoue – Inoue Hiroshi (1932–1989)
- I.O.Cook – Ian O. Cook (fl. 1991)
- I.Oliv. – Ian Oliver (born 1954)
- I.Piña – Ignacio Piña Luján (fl. 1980)
- I.Pop – Ioan Pop (1922–2018)
- I.Rácz – István Rácz (born 1952)
- Irmsch. – Edgar Irmscher (1887–1968)
- Irwin – James Bruce Irwin (1921–2012)
- Isaac – Frances Margaret Leighton (later Isaac) (1909–2006) (F.M.Leight. is also used)
- I.Sastre – Ines Sastre (born 1955)
- Isawumi – Moses A. Isawumi (fl. 1995)
- I.S.Chen – Ih Sheng Chen (fl. 1972)
- Isely – Duane Isely (1918–2000)
- I.Sinclair – Isabella Sinclair (1842–1900)
- Ising – Ernest Horace Ising (1884–1973)
- I.S.Nelson – Ira Schreiber Nelson (1911–1965)
- I.Sprague – Isaac Sprague (1811–1895)
- I.Telford – Ian R.H. Telford (born 1941)
- I.Thomps. – Ian R. Thompson (fl. 1996)
- Ito – Keisuke Ito (1803–1901)
- I.Verd. – Inez Clare Verdoorn (1896–1989)
- Iversen – Johannes Iversen (1904–1972)
- Ives – Joseph Christmas Ives (1828–1868)
- I.W.Bailey – Irving Widmer Bailey (1884–1967)
- I.W.Hutchison – Isobel Wylie Hutchison (1889–1982)
- I.Williams – Ion James Muirhead Williams (1912–2001)

== J ==
Contents: Top	A	B	C	D	E F	G	H	I J	K L	M	N O	P	Q R	S	T U V	W X Y Z

- J.A.Armstr. – James Andrew Armstrong (born 1950)
- Jaaska – Vello Jaaska (born 1936)
- Jabbour – Florian Jabbour (fl. 2011)
- Jack – William Jack (1795–1822)
- Jackes – Betsy Rivers Jackes (born 1935)
- Jacks. – George Jackson (1780–1811)
- J.A.Clark – Josephine Adelaide Clark (1856–1929)
- Jac.M.Burke – Jacinta Marie Burke (fl. 2006)
- Jacobi – Georg Albano von Jacobi (1805–1874)
- Jacobs – Maxwell Ralph Jacobs (1905–1979)
- Jacobsen – Hans Jacobsen (1815–1891)
- Jacobsson – Stig Jacobsson (born 1938)
- Jacot Guill. – Amy Jacot Guillarmod (1911–1992)
- Jacq. – Nikolaus Joseph von Jacquin (1727–1817)
- Jacq.-Fél. – Henri Jacques-Félix (1907–2008)
- Jacquem. – Venceslas Victor Jacquemont (1801–1832)
- Jacques – Henri Antoine Jacques (1782–1866)
- Jacquinot – Honoré Jacquinot (1814–1887)
- Jacz. – Arthur Arthurovič Jaczewski (1863–1932)
- Jaderh. – Axel Elof Jaderholm (1868–1927)
- Jafri – Saiyad Masudal Hasan Jafri (1927–1986)
- J.Agardh – Jacob Georg Agardh (1813–1901)
- J.A.Guim. – José d'Ascensão Guimarães (1862–1922)
- Jahand. – Émile Jahandiez (1876–1938)
- Jakubz. – Moisej Markovič Jakubziner (1898–1979)
- Jalal – Jeewan Singh Jalal (born 1979)
- Jalas – Arvo Jaakko Juhani Jalas (1920–1999)
- Jalink – Leonardo Martinus Jalink (born 1956)
- Jallad – Walid Jallad (fl. 1975)
- J.Allam. – Jean-Nicolas-Sébastien Allamand (1713 or 1716–1787 or 1793)
- J.A.Martind. – Joseph Anthony Martindale (1837–1914)
- J.A.McDonald – John Andrew McDonald (fl. 1982)
- James – Thomas Potts James (1803–1882)
- Jameson – William Jameson (1796–1873)
- J.A.Muir – John A. Muir (fl. 1973)
- Janch. – Erwin Emil Alfred Janchen (1882–1970)
- Jančovič. – Soňa Jančovičová (fl. 2011)
- Jancz. – Edward Janczewski (1846–1918)
- J.Anderson – James Anderson (fl. 1868)
- J.Andrews – J. Andrews (fl. 1952)
- Janes – Jasmine K. Janes (fl. 2010)
- Janisch. – Dmitrij E. Janischewsky (1875–1944)
- Janka – Victor von Janka (1837–1900)
- Janošík – Lukáš Janošík (fl. 2022)
- Janse – Johannes Albertus Janse (1911–1977)
- J.Anthony – John Anthony (1891–1972)
- J.A.Nyberg – Jane A. Nyberg (fl. 1994)
- J.A.Palmer – Julius Auboineau Palmer (1840–1899)
- Jarman – S. Jean Jarman
- J.A.Schmidt – Johann Anton Schmidt (1823–1905)
- Játiva – Carlos D. Játiva (fl. 1963)
- Jaub. – Hippolyte François Jaubert (1798–1874)
- Jáv. – Sándor (Alexander) Jávorka (1883–1961)
- J.Bauhin – Johann Bauhin (1541–1613)
- J.B.Beck – James B. Beck (fl. 2010)
- J.B.Comber – James Boughtwood Comber (1929–2005)
- J.B.Fisch. – Johann Baptist Fischer (1803–1832)
- J.B.Hutch. – Joseph Burtt Hutchinson (1902-1988)
- J.B.Kirkp. – James Barrie Kirkpatrick (born 1946)
- J.B.Mackay – John Bain Mackay (1795–1888)
- J.B.Nelson – John B. Nelson (born 1951)
- J.B.Petersen – Johannes Boye Petersen (1887–1961)
- J.B.Phipps – James Bird Phipps (born 1934)
- J.Bradbury – John Bradbury (1768–1823)
- J.Bradshaw – John Bradshaw (1863–1939)
- J.Breitenb. – Josef Breitenbach (1927–1998)
- J.B.Rohr – Julius Bernard von Röhr (1686–1742)
- J.B.Sinclair – James Burton Sinclair (born 1927)
- J.Buchholz – John Theodore Buchholz (1888–1951)
- J.B.Williams – John Beaumont Williams (1932–2005)
- J.Carey – John Carey (1797–1880)
- J.C.Clausen – Jens Christen (Christian) Clausen (1891–1969)
- J.C.Costa – José Carlos Augusta da Costa (born 1955)
- J.C.F.Hopkins – John Collier Frederick Hopkins (1898–1981)
- J.C.Fisch. – Johann Carl Fischer (1804–1885)
- J.C.Gomes – José Corrêa Gomes, Jr. (1919–1965)
- J.C.Hickman – James Craig Hickman (1941–1993)
- J.Clayton – John Clayton (1694–1773)
- J.C.Manning – John Charles Manning (born 1962)
- J.C.Martínez – J. Carlos Martínez Macchiavello (born 1931)
- J.C.Mikan – Johann Christian Mikan (1769–1844)
- J.C.Nelson – James Carlton Nelson (1867–1944)
- J.Commelijn – Jan Commelin (also known by Jan Commelijn or Johannes Commelinus) (1629–1692)
- J.Compton – James A. Compton (born 1953)
- J.C.Parks – James C. Parks (1942–2002)
- J.C.Prag. – Jan C. Prager (born 1934)
- J.C.Ross – James Clark Ross (1800–1862)
- J.C.Siqueira – Josafá Carlos de Siqueira (born 1953)
- J.C.Sowerby – James de Carle Sowerby (1787–1871)
- J.C.Vogel – Johannes Vogel (born 1963)
- J.C.Wendl. – Johann Christoph Wendland (1755–1828)
- J.D.Arm. – James D. Armitage (born 1976)
- J.D.Bacon – John Dudley Bacon (born 1943)
- J.D.Briggs – John D. Briggs (fl. 1994)
- J.D.Mitch. – John D. Mitchell (fl. 1993)
- J.Dransf. – John Dransfield (born 1945)
- J.D.Ray – James Davis Ray Jr. (1918–1990)
- J.Drumm. – James Drummond (1784–1863)
- J.D.Sauer – Jonathan Deininger Sauer (1918–2008)
- J.D.Schultze – Johannes Dominik Schultze (1752–1790)
- J.Duan – Jun Duan (fl. 2010)
- J.E.Alexander – James Edward Alexander (1803–1885)
- Jeanes – Jeffrey A. Jeanes (fl. 2000)
- Jean White – Jean White-Haney (1877–1953)
- Jebb – Matthew H. P. Jebb (born 1958)
- J.E.Br. – John Ednie Brown (1848–1899)
- Jefferies – R.L. Jefferies (fl. 1987)
- Jeffrey – John Frederick Jeffrey (1866–1943)
- J.E.Gray – John Edward Gray (1800–1875)
- Jekyll – Gertrude Jekyll (1843–1932)
- J.E.Lange – Jakob Emanuel Lange (1864–1941) (father of Knud Morten Lange)
- J.E.Little – Joseph Edward Little (1861–1935)
- J.Ellis – John Ellis (1710–1776)
- J.E.Palmér – Johan Ernst Palmér (1863–1946)
- J.E.Pohl – Johann Ehrenfried Pohl (1746–1800)
- Jeps. – Willis Linn Jepson (1867–1946)
- Jérémie – Joël Jérémie (born 1944)
- J.E.Reid – Jordan E. Reid (fl. 2009)
- J.E.Sowerby – John Edward Sowerby (1825–1870)
- Jess. – Karl Friedrich Wilhelm Jessen (1821–1889)
- Jessop – John Peter Jessop (born 1939)
- Jessup – Laurence W. Jessup (born 1947)
- Jeswiet – Jacob Jeswiet (1879–1966)
- Jeuken – M. Jeuken (fl. 1952)
- J.Everett – Joy Everett (born 1953)
- J.E.Vidal – Jules Eugène Vidal (1914–2020)
- J.E.Wright – Jorge Eduardo Wright (1922–2005)
- J.E.Zetterst. – Johan Emanuel Zetterstedt (1828–1880)
- J.Fabr. – Johan Christian Fabricius (1745–1808)
- J.F.Bailey – John Frederick Bailey (1866–1938)
- J.F.Clark – Judson Freeman Clark (1870–1942)
- J.F.Cowell – John Francis Cowell (1852–1915)
- J.F.Gmel. – Johann Friedrich Gmelin (1748–1804)
- J.Fisch. – Jacob Benjamin Fischer (1730–1793)
- J.-F.Leroy – Jean-François Leroy (1915–1999)
- J.Florence – Jacques Florence (born 1951)
- J.F.Macbr. – James Francis Macbride (1892–1976)
- J.F.Matthews – James F. Matthews (born 1935)
- J.F.Maxwell – James F. Maxwell (1949–2015)
- J.F.Morales – Juan Francisco Morales (born 1970)
- J.Forbes – James Forbes (1773–1861)
- J.Frost – John Frost (1803–1840)
- J.Fryer – Jeanette Fryer (fl. 1993)
- J.Gay – Jacques Etienne Gay (1786–1864)
- J.G.Cooper – James Graham Cooper (1830–1902)
- J.Gerard – John Gerard (1545–1612)
- J.Gerlach – Justin Gerlach (born 1970)
- J.G.Fowler – J. Gurney Fowler (fl. 1914)
- J.G.Gmel. – Johann Georg Gmelin (1709–1755)
- J.G.Jack – John George Jack (1861–1949)
- J.G.Kühn – Julius Gotthelf Kühn (1825–1910)
- J.G.Nelson – John Gudgeon Nelson (1818–1882)
- J.Gröntved – Julius Gröntved (or Grøntved) (1899–1967)
- J.G.Sm. – Jared Gage Smith (1866–1957)
- J.Guan Wang – Jia-Guan Wang (fl. 2022)
- J.G.West – Judith Gay West (born 1949)
- J.H.Adam – Jumaat Haji Adam (born 1956)
- J.H.Chau – John H. Chau (fl. 2017)
- J.H.Christ – John Henry ("Heinie") Christ (1896–1972)
- J.Harriman – John Harriman (1760–1831)
- J.Heck. – Jacqueline Heckenhauer (fl. 2021)
- J.H.Kirkbr. – Joseph Harold Kirkbride (born 1943)
- J.Hogg – John Hogg (1800–1869)
- J.Houz. – Jean Houzeau de Lehaie (1867–1959)
- J.H.Ross – James Henderson Ross (born 1941)
- J.H.Schaffn. – John Henry Schaffner (1866–1939)
- J.H.So – Ji Hyeon So (fl. 2017)
- J.H.Thomas – John Hunter Thomas (1928–1999)
- J.H.Wallace – John Hume Wallace (born 1918)
- J.H.Willis – James Hamlyn Willis (1910–1995)
- Jian Wang ter – Jian Wang (fl. 2016)
- Jian W.Li – Jian Wu Li (fl. 2014)
- J.I.Cohen – James I. Cohen (fl. 2009)
- Jílek – Bohumil Jílek (1905–1972)
- J.Jacobsen – Jens Peter Jacobsen (1847–1885)
- J.J.Amann – Jean Jules Amann (1859–1939)
- J.J.Atwood – John Jacob Atwood (born 1981)
- J.J.Bruhl – Jeremy James Bruhl (born 1956)
- J.J.Engel – John Jay Engel (born 1941)
- J.Jiménez Alm. – José de Jesús Jiménez Almonte (1905–1982)
- J.J.Kickx – Jean Jacques Kickx (1842–1887)
- J.J.Rodr – Juan Joaquín Rodríguez y Femenías (1839–1905)
- J.J.Scheuchzer – Johann Jacob Scheuchzer (1672–1733)
- J.J.Sm. – Johannes Jacobus Smith (1867–1947)
- J.Jundz. – Józef Jundzill (1794–1877)
- J.Juss. – Joseph de Jussieu (1704–1779)
- J.J.Verm. – Jaap J. Vermeulen (born 1955)
- J.J.Wood – Jeffrey James Wood (1952–2019)
- J.K.Bartlett – John Kenneth Bartlett (1945–1986)
- J.Kern – Johannes Hendrikus Kern (1903–1974)
- J.Kern. – Johann Simon von Kerner (1755–1830)
- J.Kickx – Jean Kickx, Sr. (1775–1831)
- J.Kickx f. – Jean Kickx, Jr. (1803–1864)
- J.K.Morton – John Kenneth Morton (1928–2011)
- J.Koenig – Johann Gerhard Koenig (1728–1785)
- J.Kost. – Joséphine Thérèse Koster (1902–1986)
- J.K.Towns. – John Kirk Townsend (1809–1851)
- J.Lachm. – Johannes Lachmann (1832–1860)
- J.L.Clark – John Littner Clark (born 1969)
- J.Lee – James Lee (1715–1795)
- J.Léonard – Jean Joseph Gustave Léonard (1920–2013)
- J.L.Garrido – José Luis Garrido (fl. 2012)
- J.L.Gentry – Johnnie Lee Gentry (born 1939)
- J.Lowe – Josiah Lincoln Lowe (1905–1997)
- J.L.Palmer – Johann Ludwig Palmer (1784–1836)
- J.L.Parm. – Jean Louis Jacques Henri Parmentier (1777–1865)
- J.L.Porter – John L. Porter (born 1964)
- J.L.Schultz – Joanna L. Schultz (born 1963)
- J.Lundb. – Johannes Lundberg (fl. 2001)
- J.MacGill. – John MacGillivray (1822–1867)
- J.Mackay – James Townsend Mackay (1775–1862)
- J.Macrae – James Macrae (died 1830)
- J.Martyn – John Martyn (1699–1768)
- J.Mathew – Jose Mathew (born 1985)
- J.M.A.Braga - João Marcelo Alvarenga Braga (born 1971)
- J.M.Bigelow – John Milton Bigelow (1804–1878)
- J.M.Black – John McConnell Black (1855–1951)
- J.M.Clarke – John Mason Clarke (1857–1925)
- J.McNab – James McNab (1810–1878)
- J.M.Coult. – John Merle Coulter (1851–1928)
- J.M.C.Rich. – Jean Michel Claude Richard (1787–1868)
- J.M.Gillett – John Montague Gillett (1918–2014)
- J.M.Hart – J.M. Hart (fl. 1998)
- J.M.H.Shaw – Julian Mark Hugh Shaw (born 1955)
- J.Milne – Josephine Milne (born 1957)
- J.M.Kain – Joanna M. Kain (1930–2017)
- J.M.MacDougal – John Mochrie MacDougal (born 1954)
- J.M.Macoun – James Melville Macoun (1862–1920)
- J.M.Monts. – Josep Maria Montserrat Martí (born 1955)
- J.M.Muñoz – Jesús M. Muñoz (born 1955)
- J.Moll – Jan Willem Moll (1851–1933)
- J.M.Porter – James Mark Porter (born 1956)
- J.M.Powell – Jocelyn Marie Powell (born 1939)
- J.M.Schopf – James Morton Schopf (1911–1978)
- J.M.Taylor – Joan M. Taylor (born 1929)
- J.M.Tucker – John Maurice Tucker (1916–2008)
- J.Muir – John Muir (1838–1914)
- J.Muñoz – Jesús Muñoz (born 1964)
- J.Murata – Jin Murata (born 1952)
- J.Murray – John Murray (1841–1914)
- J.M.Waller – James Martin Waller (born 1938)
- J.M.Ward – Josephine M. Ward (fl. 1997)
- J.M.Watson – John Michael Watson (1936–2024)
- J.M.Webber – John Milton Webber (1897–1984)
- J.M.Wood – John Medley Wood (1827–1915)
- Jn.Dalton – John Dalton (1766–1844)
- J.Nelson – John Nelson (1826–1867)
- J.N.Haage – Johann Nicolaus Haage (1826–1878)
- J.N.Zhang – Jin Ning Zhang (fl. 1998)
- Jobson – Peter Craig Jobson (born 1965)
- Johan-Olsen (also Sopp) – Olav Johan Sopp (1860–1931)
- Johans. – Frits Johansen (1882–1957)
- Johanss. – Karl Johansson (1856–1928)
- John Muir – John Muir (1874–1947)
- John Parkinson – John Parkinson (1567–1650)
- Johnst. – George Johnston (1797–1855)
- Johow – Federico Johow (also as Friedrich Richard Adelbert (or Adelbart) Johow) (1859–1933)
- Jones – William Jones (1746–1794)
- Jongkind – Carel Christiaan Hugo Jongkind (born 1954)
- Jonst. – John Jonston (also as Johannes Jonston or Joannes Jonstonus) (1603–1675)
- Jord. – Claude Thomas Alexis Jordan (1814–1897)
- Jordanov – Daki Jordanov (1893–1978)
- Jørg. – Eugen Honoratius (Honoratus) Jørgensen (1862–1938)
- Josekutty – Elayanithottathil Joseph Josekutty (fl. 2016)
- Joshi – Amar Chaud Joshi (1908–1971)
- Jos.Kern. – Josef Kerner (1829–1906)
- Jos.Martin – Joseph Martin (fl. 1788–1826)
- J.Ott – Jonathan Ott (born 1949)
- Jovet – Paul Albert Jovet (1896–1991)
- Jovet-Ast – Suzanne Jovet-Ast (1914–2006)
- Joy Thomps. – Joy Thompson (1923–2018)
- J.Palmer – Joanne Palmer (born 1960)
- J.P.Anderson – Jacob Peter Anderson (1874–1953)
- J.Parn. – John Adrian Naicker Parnell (born 1954)
- J.P.Bull – J.P.Bull – Jerome Patrick Bull (born 1972)
- J.Pfeiff. – Johan Philip Pfeiffer (1888–1947)
- J.-P.Frahm – Jan-Peter Frahm (1945–2014)
- J.P.Nelson – Jane P. Nelson (fl. 1980)
- J.Poiss. – Jules Poisson (1833–1919)
- J.P.Pigott – Julian Patrick Pigott (fl. 2001)
- J.Prado – Jefferson Prado (born 1964)
- J.Prak.Rao – Jonnakuti Prakasa Rao (fl. 2017)
- J.Presl – Jan Svatopluk Presl (1791–1849)
- J.P.Yue – Ji-pei Yue (fl. 2004)
- J.Raynal – Jean Raynal (1933–1979)
- J.R.Clarkson – John Richard Clarkson (born 1950)
- J.R.Drumm. – James Ramsay Drummond (1851–1921)
- J.Rémy – Ezechiel Jules Rémy (1826–1893)
- J.R.Edm. – John Richard Edmondson (born 1948)
- J.R.Forst. – Johann Reinhold Forster (1729–1798)
- J.R.Grande – José Ramón Grande Allende (born 1983)
- J.R.Grant – Jason Randall Grant (born 1969)
- J.R.I.Wood – John Richard Ironside Wood (born 1944)
- J.R.Lee – John Ramsay Lee (1868–1959)
- J.Rob. – John Robinson (1846–1925)
- J.R.Rohrer – Joseph Raphael Rohrer (born 1954)
- J.Roth – Johannes Rudolph Roth (1815–1858)
- J.Rousseau – Joseph Jules Jean Jacques Rousseau (1905–1970)
- J.Roux – Jean Roux (1876–1939)
- J.R.Perkins – John Russell Perkins (born 1868)
- J.R.Rolfe – Jeremy Richard Rolfe (fl. 2013)
- J.R.Wheeler – Judith Roderick Wheeler (born 1944)
- J.Scheff. – Jozef Scheffer (1903–1949)
- J.Scheuchzer – Johannes Gaspar Scheuchzer (1684–1738)
- J.Schiller – Josef Schiller (1877–1960)
- J.Schneid. – Josef Schneider (died 1885)
- J.Schröt. – Joseph Schröter (1837–1894)
- J.Schultze-Motel – Jürgen Schultze-Motel (born 1930)
- J.Schust. – Julius Schuster (1886–1949)
- J.S.Ma – Jin Shuang Ma (born 1955)
- J.Scott – John Scott (1838–1880)
- J.Scriba – Julius Karl Scriba (1848–1905)
- J.Steiner – Julius Steiner (1844–1918)
- J.Sinclair – James Sinclair (1913–1968)
- J.Sm. – John Smith (1798–1888)
- J.S.Martin – James Stillman Martin (1914–2000)
- J.S.Mill. – James Spencer Miller (born 1953)
- J.S.Muell. – John Miller (1715–c.1792) aka Johann Sebastian Mueller
- J.Soulié – Jean André Soulié (1858–1905)
- J.S.Pringle – James Scott Pringle (1937–2024)
- J.Stewart – Joyce Stewart (1936–2011)
- J.St.-Hil. – Jean Henri Jaume Saint-Hilaire (1772–1845)
- J.Stirl. – James Stirling (1852–1909)
- J.Swamy – Jetti Swamy (fl. 2016)
- J.T.Baldwin – John Thomas Baldwin (1910–1974)
- J.T.Curtis – John Thomas Curtis (1913–1961)
- J.T.Johanss. – Jan Thomas Johansson (fl. 1988)
- J.T.Howell – John Thomas Howell (1903–1994)
- J.T.Hunter – John T. Hunter (fl. 1967)
- J.T.Palmer – James Terence Palmer (born 1923)
- J.T.Pan – Jin Tang Pan (born 1935)
- J.T.Pereira – Joan T. Pereira (fl. 1994)
- J.T.Quekett – John Thomas Quekett (1815–1861) (brother of Edwin John Quekett)
- J.Traill – James Traill (died 1853)
- J.T.Wall – J. T. Wall (fl. 1934)
- J.T.Waterh. – John Teast Waterhouse (1924–1983)
- J.T.Williams – John Trevor Williams (1938–2015)
- Judd – Walter Stephen Judd (born 1951)
- Judz. – Emmet J. Judziewicz (born 1953)
- Jum. – Henri Lucien Jumelle (1866–1935)
- Jungh. – (Friedrich) Franz Wilhelm Junghuhn (1809–1864)
- Junius – Hadrianus Junius (1511–1575)
- Juss. – Antoine Laurent de Jussieu (1748–1836)
- Juswara – Lina Susanti Juswara (born 1971)
- Juz. – Sergei Vasilievich Juzepczuk (1893–1959)
- J.V.Lamour. – Jean Vincent Félix Lamouroux (1779–1825)
- J.V.Schneid. – Julio Valentin Schneider (born 1967)
- J.V.Stone – Judi V. Stone (born 1946)
- J.V.Thomps. – John Vaughan Thompson (1779–1847)
- J.Wallis – John Wallis (1714–1793)
- J.W.Baker – Jason W. Baker (born 1981)
- J.W.Benn. – John Whitchurch Bennett (fl. 1842)
- J.W.Cribb – Joan Winifred Cribb (1930–2023)
- J.W.Dawson – John Wyndham Dawson (1928–2019)
- J.Wen – Jun Wen (born 1963)
- J.West – James West (1875–1939)
- J.W.Green – John William Green (born 1930)
- J.W.Grimes – James Walter Grimes (born 1953)
- J.W.Horn – James W. Horn (fl. 2009)
- J.White R.N. – John White (1757–1832)
- J.W.Ingram – John William Ingram (born 1924)
- J.W.Mast. – John William Masters (1792–1873)
- J.W.Moore – John William Moore (1901–1990) (not to be confused with the American politician of the same name)
- J.Woods – Joseph Woods Jr. (1776–1864)
- J.W.Powell – John Wesley Powell (1834–1902)
- J.W.Robbins – James Watson Robbins (1801–1879)
- J.W.Sturm – Johann Wilhelm Sturm (1808–1865)
- J.W.Thomson – John Walter Thomson (1913–2009)
- J.W.Weinm. – Johann Wilhelm Weinmann (1683–1741)
- J.W.White – James Walter White (1846–1932)
- J.W.Zetterst. – Johan Wilhelm Zetterstedt (1785–1874)
- J.W.Zhai – Jun Wen Zhai (born 1985)
- J.Zahlbr. – Johann Zahlbruckner (1782–1851)
- J.Z.Weber – Joseph Zvonko Weber (1930–1996)

== K–Z ==
Contents: Top	A	B	C	D	E F	G	H	I J	K L	M	N O	P	Q R	S	T U V	W X Y Z

To find entries for K–Z, use the table of contents above.

== See also ==
- List of South African plant botanical authors
- List of botanists
- Category:Botanists
- List of Russian botanists
- List of zoologists by author abbreviation
