= James Ray =

James Ray may refer to:

- James Ray (historian) (fl. 18th century), English historian of the Jacobite rebellion of 1745
- James B. Ray (1794–1848), governor of Indiana
- James Enos Ray Jr. (1874–1934), American politician
- James Davis Ray Jr. (1918–1990), American botanist
- James Earl Ray (1928–1998), American assassin of Martin Luther King Jr.
- Jim Ray (basketball) (1934–1987), American basketball player
- James Ray (singer) (1941–c. 1963), R&B singer in the early 1960s
- James Edwin Ray (born 1941), U.S. Air Force fighter pilot and Vietnam-era prisoner-of-war
- Jim Ray (1944–2005), American baseball player
- James Ray (basketball) (1957–2023), American basketball player
- James Arthur Ray (1957–2025), American professional speaker and author convicted of negligent homicide in 2011
- Jimmy Ray (born 1970), English musician
- James Ray (rock musician) (fl. 21st century), American rock singer and band-leader, founding member of James Ray and The Performance, James Ray's Gangwar, The MK Ultra, and his current band 4080peru

== See also ==
- James Rae (disambiguation)
- Jimmy Rayl (1941–2019), American basketball player
