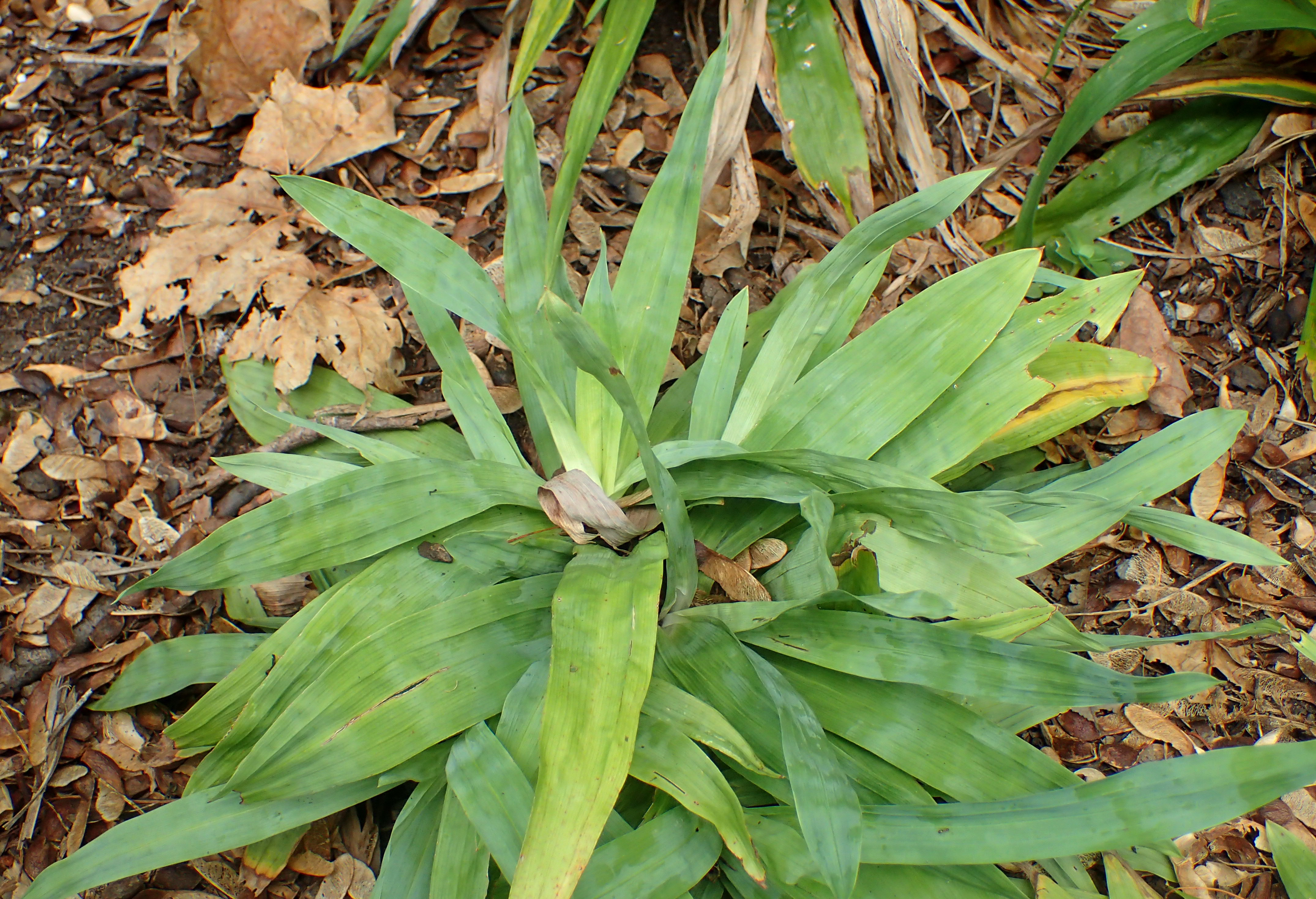
- Foliage
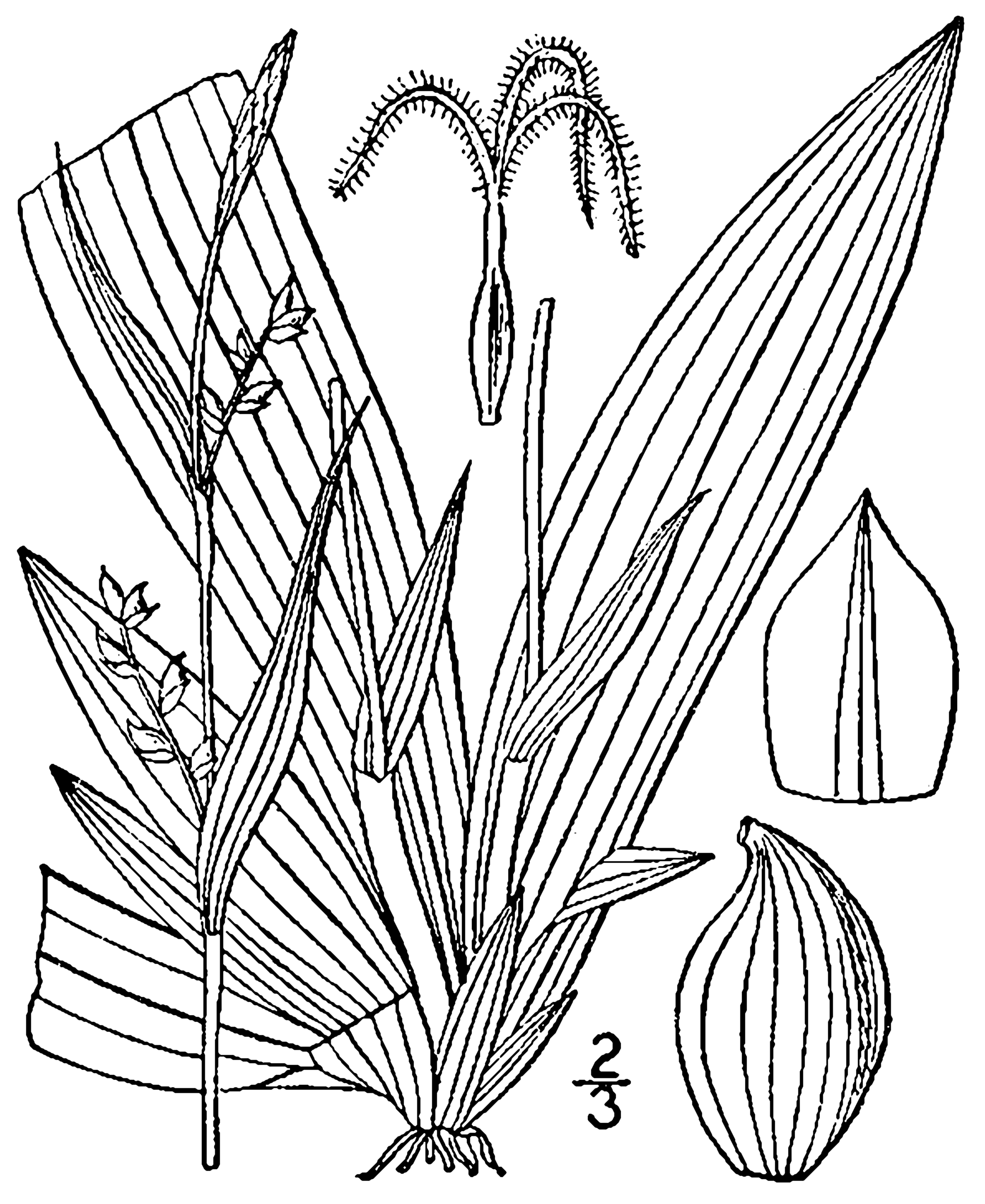
- Botanical illustration

Scientific classification
- Kingdom: Plantae
- Clade: Tracheophytes
- Clade: Angiosperms
- Clade: Monocots
- Clade: Commelinids
- Order: Poales
- Family: Cyperaceae
- Genus: Carex
- Species: C. platyphylla

Binomial name
- Carex platyphylla J.Carey

Synonyms
- Carex platyphylla var. longipedunculata Kük.

= Carex platyphylla =

Species of flowering plant

Carex platyphylla, called the broad leaf sedge and silver sedge, is a species of flowering plant in the genus Carex, native to southeast Canada, and the north-central and eastern United States. It is often found in the same forests as Carex plantaginea, also a broad-leaved species, but they do not compete, as C. plantaginea prefers wet areas and C. platyphylla prefers it dry. Silver sedge is considered a useful native ornamental, since it is showy, deer-resistant, and able to tolerate both deep shade and drought once established.
