= Sastre =

Surname list

Sastre (which means tailor in Spanish) is a surname. Notable people with the surname include:

- Alfonso Sastre (1926–2021), Spanish playwright
- Antonio Sastre, (1911–1987), Argentinian footballer
- Carlos Sastre (born 1975), Spanish cyclist
- Eduardo Sastre (1910–?), Argentine fencer
- Elvira Sastre (born 1992), Spanish poet
- Ernesto Sastre (born 1926), Colombian fencer
- Fernand Sastre (1923–1998), French football official
- Inés Sastre, (born 1973), Spanish model and actress
- Inés Sastre de Jesús (born 1955), Puerto Rican botanist
- Jaume Sastre (born 1959), Spanish teacher, writer and activist
- Joan Sastre (basketball) (born 1991), Spanish basketball player
- Joan Sastre (footballer) (born 1997), Spanish footballer
- Josep Sastre (1906–1962), Spanish footballer
- Katia Sastre (born 1976), Brazilian politician
- Lluís Sastre, (born 1986), Spanish footballer
- Marcos Sastre, (1808–1897), Argentinian-Uruguayan writer
- Martin Sastre, (born 1976), Uruguayan media artist
- Miguel Ángel Sastre Uyá, Spanish politician
- Óscar Sastre (1920–2012), Argentine footballer
- Peggy Sastre (born 1981), French journalist
- Rafel Sastre (born 1975), Spanish footballer
- Tià Sastre (born 1994), Spanish footballer

== See also ==
- Sastre, Santa Fe
