= Gerard Verschuuren =

Dutch-American scientist and philosopher (1946–2026)

Gerard M. Verschuuren
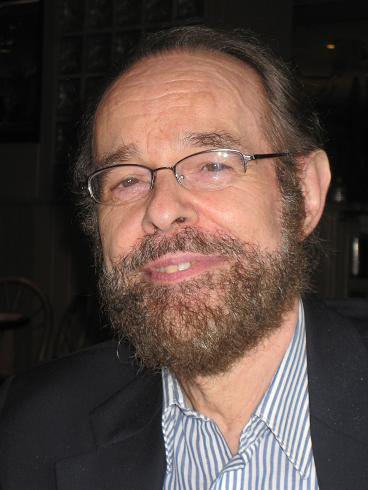
- Born: 29 May 1946; Netherlands
- Died: 31 May 2026 (aged 80); Atkinson, New Hampshire, U.S.
- Education: Leiden University, Utrecht University, VU University Amsterdam
- Occupations: Scientist, Professor, Speaker, Consultant
- Spouse: Trudy Doucette (m. 1983)
- Scientific career
- Fields: Biology, human genetics, philosophy of science, philosophy of biology, VBA, VB.NET and C#.NET
- Doctoral advisor: Cornelis van Peursen
- Other academic advisors: John Huizinga, Marius Jeuken

Gerard M. Verschuuren (29 May 1946 – 31 May 2026) was a Dutch human biologist, writer, speaker and consultant, working at the interface of science, philosophy, and religion. He was a human biologist, specialized in human genetics, who also earned a doctorate in the philosophy of science, and studied and worked at universities in Europe and the United States. In 1994, he moved permanently to the United States, and lived in New Hampshire until his death.

== Studies and research ==
Verschuuren began studying biology at Leiden University and specialized in human genetics at Utrecht University in the Netherlands, with a thesis on the statistical analysis of epigenetic variation in the Tellem skulls of Mali in comparison with the Kurumba tribe of Burkina Faso (former Upper Volta). After that, he became a participant of the six-member Human Adaptability Project team (led by professor John Huizinga) of the former Institute of Human Biology at Utrecht University Medical School, as part of the International Biological Program, studying the population genetics and adaptation of savannah populations in sub-saharan Africa based on research among the Fali in northern Cameroon, among the Dogon in Mali, and among the Fulbe in Chad.

He also studied philosophy at Leiden University and wrote, under supervision of professor Marius Jeuken, a thesis on the impact of the Harvard philosopher and mathematician Alfred North Whitehead on research in biology. He further specialized in philosophy of science, in particular in philosophy of biology, at VU University Amsterdam. Verschuuren concluded his post-graduate studies with a doctoral thesis on the use of models in the sciences. In this work, he analyzes how all sciences use models, which are simplified replicas of the dissected original, made for research purposes by reducing the complexity of the original to a manageable model related to a soluble problem.

Verschuuren taught biology, biological anthropology, genetics, human genetics, statistics, philosophy, philosophy of biology, logic, and programming at Leiden University, Utrecht University, the Dutch Open University, Merrimack College, and Boston College. He focused almost exclusively on writing, consulting, and on speaking engagements.

== Educational work ==
Verschuuren became the leader of a team of textbook writers that developed three consecutive series of biology textbooks for high-schools and colleges under the names Biosfeer (1975–1983), Oculair (1984–1994), and Grondslagen van de Biologie (Foundations of Biology; 1985–present). He also became a member of the College Admission Test team for biology in the Netherlands (1976–1982).

For those specifically interested in the philosophy of biology, he wrote four textbooks: Investigating the Life Sciences: An Introduction to the Philosophy of Science (1986), Life Scientists: Their Convictions, Their Activities, and Their Values (1995), The Holism-Reductionism Debate - In Physics, Genetics, Biology, Neuroscience, Ecology, Sociology (2016), and Darwin's Philosophical Legacy - The Good and the Not-So-Good (2012).

To reach fellow scientists as well, he started in cooperation with the professors Cornelis Van Peursen and Cornelis Schuyt, both of Leiden University, an overseeing editorial board for the development of 25 books on the philosophy of science for 25 specific fields, written by experts in those fields (1986–present), Nijhoff, Leiden, Series Philosophy of the Sciences.

During the 1970s, Verschuuren wrote a weekly column on breaking biological topics in the Volkskrant daily. He was a member of the editorial board of the Dutch philosophical magazine Wijsgerig Perspectief, for which he wrote several of its articles, and a member of the editorial board of the Dutch-Flemish magazine Streven, for which he also wrote articles and book reviews. All in all, he wrote many books and articles in Dutch on biological and philosophical issues.

In the 1980s, Verschuuren was an advisor to the Foundation Scientific Europe, which published a voluminous overview of research and technology in 20 European countries, entitled Scientific Europe (edited by Nigel Calder). From 1985 until 1994, he was the editor-in-chief of the Dutch magazine Natuurwetenschap en Techniek and publisher of the Dutch version of the Scientific American Library.

== At the interface of science and religion ==
A practicing Catholic, Verschuuren was interested in the relationship between science and religion. It was his conviction that religion and science cannot be in conflict with each other and cannot be seen as a threat to each other, as long as both stay in their own territory, which prevents us from turning science into a pseudo-religion, or religion into a semi-science. Put in the words of Augustine of Hippo or Galileo Galilei, science reads the "Book of Nature" and religion reads the "Book of Scripture," for they both have the same Author, GOD.

From this perspective, grounded in the tradition of Thomas Aquinas, he has written several books:

- Darwin's Philosophical Legacy - The Good and the Not-So-Good. There is hardly any university, college, or even high school left where they do not teach Darwinism—and rightly so. Yet, most of these places do more preaching than teaching. In what the author likes to call "The Good" parts of his legacy, he explores what Darwin's great contributions are to the study of evolution and to the theory of evolution. At the same time, he also delves into the areas where his thoughts were not so perfect or even wrong, especially in a philosophical sense—which he calls "The Not-So-Good" parts of his legacy. There are definitely two sides to Darwin's legacy and they need to be carefully balanced.
- What Makes You Tick? - A New Paradigm for Neuroscience. In the first chapters, he argues that it is not molecules, DNA, or not even neurons that make you "tick." This is obviously contrasted with the current paradigm of neuroscience. The current paradigm of neuroscience—which he now calls the "old" paradigm—is too materialistic, too deterministic, and too reductionistic to do justice to the unique position of living human beings in the world. It calls for a more comprehensive paradigm!
- The Destiny of the Universe - In Pursuit of the Great Unknown. This book is not about astronomy, not even about science per se, but about the Great Unknown beyond and behind all that we can see through our telescopes and microscopes. Although, there is a lot of science in this book, at a simplified level, it is mainly a critical philosophical journey, starting in the world of science, but ultimately in pursuit of the Great Unknown that has become more and more known in the lives of so many people.
- It's All in the Genes! - Really?. A decade ago, the general estimate for the number of human genes was thought to be well over 100,000, but then turned out to be around 30,000 genes—which is only half again as many genes as a tiny roundworm needs to manufacture its utter simplicity. And human beings have only 300 unique genes not found in mice. No wonder that the president of Celera, a bio-corporation, said about this surprising finding "This tells me genes cannot possibly explain all of what makes us what we are." At least, we have a first indication here that genes are not as almighty as some want us to believe.
- Five Anti-Catholic Myths - Slavery, Crusades, Inquisition, Galileo, Holocaust. The myths analyzed in this book claim to lay bare the "dirty history" of the Catholic Church. Well, the Catholic Church's "dirty history" is not that dirty at all. As Pope Leo XIII once said, the Catholic Church has no reason to fear historical truth. Yet, some Catholics as well as many non-Catholics often see history through a lens that has been shaped by post-Reformation propaganda or by 18th century Enlightenment prejudices. These myths served a purpose then, but they still serve a purpose in today's secularist climate of progress and scientism. But does that really validate them? Scholarship of recent decades, however, has thrown new light on these matters, and is finally allowing the truths of history to become more widely known.
- Life's Journey - From Conception to Growing Up, Growing Old, and Natural Death. This book describes the six main phases of life's journey in more or less detail. Some of these stages the reader may have gone through already; others are still ahead of them. They may not be able to retrace previous stages, but they are probably anxious to know what is ahead of them. And besides, they may have children who are going through earlier stages and parents who are experiencing later stages. Each chapter discusses one specific stage of life's journey. Every chapter begins with a biological description of that period in life, followed by a more philosophical reflection. One cannot be without the other. We need facts before we can reflect, but facts without reflection are meaningless.
- Matters of Life and Death - A Catholic Guide to the Moral Dilemmas of Our Time. We live in a time of very divergent opinions about right and wrong, life and death, sexuality and sex, pro-life and pro-choice, prolonging life and shortening life. We all wonder what can help us to pilot through the raging waters of this turbulent ocean. Where do we find sound judgments in the midst of these debates? What we need more than ever is a moral compass.
- Aquinas and Modern Science - A New Synthesis of Faith and Reason. What could Aquinas ever contribute to our time, some seven centuries later? One of the main reasons is that there are many similarities between his time and our time, between his world and our world. His thirteenth century world was as turbulent as ours is. His world was confronted with an influx of new ideas coming from the Muslim world; our world is constantly being inundated with new ideas, particularly coming from scientists. His world saw the sudden rise of universities; our world sees an explosion of sciences and their sub-disciplines. His time was marked by dubious philosophies; our time has been infiltrated with skepticism and relativism. His era was a time of tremendous change; ours is also in permanent instability. His world had lost faith in reason; ours has too. Aquinas understood both the fascination of his contemporaries with new discoveries and new ideas and the very mixed feelings that come with all of that. So he would understand our time too.
- The Holism-Reductionism Debate - In Physics, Genetics, Biology, Neuroscience, Ecology, Sociology. This book is intended for those working in, or preparing for, research in any scientific field — ranging from the physical sciences to the life sciences to the behavioral sciences and the social sciences. It is certainly not meant for people specialized in areas dealing with the specific issue of reductionism in a strict philosophical sense; they won't learn much new from this book. Philosophers have the task of questioning and analyzing what most other people, including scientists, usually take for granted. For that reason, this book is basically a plea against dogmatism in science, in favor of a more open-minded approach. Dogmas do not belong in science, but they do occur in the scientific community.
- The Myth of an Anti-Science Church - Galileo, Darwin, Teilhard, Hawking, Dawkins. What do these five scientists have in common? General perception has it that something went wrong between them and the Catholic Church. Is that true, or are we dealing with a fabrication? If it is true, what exactly went wrong between them? This book analyzes these five "cases" in their confrontation with the Catholic Church. Usually the Church ends up being the villain. But what about these scientists themselves? One could make the case that all five of them have something like a double personality: the personality of the scientist and the personality of the ideologist hiding behind the scientist.
- Faith and Reason - The Cradle of Truth. The reciprocal relationship between faith and reason has been a constant theme in Catholic intellectual history, and it explains why the Catholic intellectual tradition is so rich, strong and full, perhaps unlike anything else in the world. In his famous Regensburg address and elsewhere, Pope Benedict XVI stressed the perennial relevance of Pope John Paul II's encyclical Fides et Ratio (Faith and Reason) and the need for Faith to purify Reason, and for Reason to purify Faith.
- Forty Anti-Catholic Lies. Catholics are believed to have certain beliefs "out of line" with mainstream thinking. However, those beliefs are often caricatures that are misrepresentations of the real beliefs Catholics hold. What do Catholics really believe? Asking any Catholic is not always the best way to find out, for some Catholics may not even know the finer details of their own faith, or they have already been affected by the misinformation that keeps bombarding them.
- The Eclipse of God. This book was specifically written for all those who feel lost in a world dominated by ideologies that obscure God. It is hard to pinpoint one particular cause of how we feel in such Godforsaken times and places, but science is likely one of the main perpetrators.
- In the Beginning: A Catholic Scientist Explains How God Made Earth Our Home. Instead of the vaunted "randomness" of our immense universe, scientists have recently discovered indisputable patterns in the structures of matter and energy. Over the eons, these distinctive patterns drove the universe inexorably toward formation of the Earth as what we experience it to be.
- A Catholic Scientist Proves God Exists. The question of whether God exists is not one science can answer. Instead, just as reason gives us access to the existence of numbers, so it is reason that gives us access to the existence of God.
- At the Dawn of Humanity - The First Humans. This book investigates in the first five chapters how genes may change from generation to generation — before, during, and after the dawn of humanity. Next the book discusses how much these mechanisms can explain of what many people consider unique to humanity: the faculties of language, rationality, morality, self-awareness, and religion. Are those features really unique, or did they come from the non-human animal world? Were the first humans able to use language, to think rationally, to act morally, to know who they were, and to know there is a God? The answer may surprise you.
- How Science Points to God. This book explains how much there is in various fields of science that points to God. They are pointers, though, not proofs. But all of them combined make it hard to deny that there is a God who made all of this possible, including science.
- A Catholic Scientist Champions the Shroud of Turin. This book carefully weighs the claims that science makes pro and con the authenticity of the Shroud of Turin. Verschuuren reveals the reasons why he believes the Shroud of Turin to be the actual burial cloth of Jesus Christ

== Death ==
Verschuuren died on 31 May 2026, two days after his 80th birthday.

== Books and articles ==
- Verschuuren, Geert (1971). Race and Races. In Heythrop Journal, 12, 164–174
- Verschuuren, Geert M.N. (1981). Modelgebruik in the Wetenschappen. Kok, Kampen, Netherlands ISBN 90-242-2161-7
- Verschuuren, G.M.N., Hans De Bruin, Manfred Halsema (1985, 2001). Grondslagen van de Biologie (3 volumes). Wolters Kluwer, Netherlands ISBN 90-207-1372-8
- Marcum, James and G.M.N. Verschuuren (1986). Hemostatic Regulation and Whitehead's Philosophy of Organism. In Acta Biotheoretica, 35, 123–133
- Verschuuren, Gerard M. (1986), Investigating the Life Sciences: An Introduction to the Philosophy of Science. In the series Foundations & Philosophy of Science & Technology, Pergamon Press ISBN 0-08-032031-7
- Verschuuren, Gerard M. (1995), Life Scientists: Their Convictions, Their Activities, and Their Values. Genesis Publishing Company, North Andover, MA ISBN 1-886670-00-5
- Verschuuren, Gerard M. (1905–present), The Visual Learning Series (10 different titles published so far). Holy Macro! Books, Uniontown, OH
- Verschuuren, Gerard M. (2007). From VBA to VSTO. Holy Macro! Books, Uniontown, OH ISBN 1-932802-14-2
- Verschuuren, Gerard M. (2013). Excel 2013 for Scientists and Engineers. Holy Macro! Books, Uniontown, OH ISBN 978-1-932802-35-1
- Verschuuren, Gerard M. (2013). VBScript Programming. Holy Macro! Books, Uniontown, OH ISBN 978-1615470181
- Verschuuren, Gerard M. (2012). Darwin's Philosophical Legacy - The Good and the Not-So-Good. Lexington Books, Lanham, MD ISBN 978-0-7391-7520-0 (hardcover), ISBN 978-0-7391-9058-6
- Verschuuren, Gerard M. (2012). What Makes You Tick? - A New Paradigm of Neuroscience. Solas Press, Antioch, CA ISBN 978-1-893426-04-7 (softcover) and ISBN 1-893426-04-1 (eBook)
- Verschuuren, Gerard M. (2014). The Destiny of the Universe - In Pursuit of the Great Unknown. Paragon House Publishers, Saint Paul, MN ISBN 978-1-55778-908-2 (softcover)
- Verschuuren, Gerard M. (2014). It's All in the Genes! - Really?. Createspace, Charleston, SC ISBN 978-1496031686
- Verschuuren, Gerard M. (2015). Five Anti-Catholic Myths - Slavery, Crusades, Inquisition, Galileo, Holocaust. Angelico Press, Kettering, OH ISBN 978-1-62138-128-0
- Verschuuren, Gerard M. (2015). Life's Journey - From Conception to Growing Up, Growing Old, and Natural Death. Angelico Press, Kettering, OH ISBN 978-1-62138-164-8
- Verschuuren, Gerard M. (2016). Aquinas and Modern Science - A New Synthesis of Faith and Reason. Angelico Press, Kettering, OH ISBN 1621382281
- Verschuuren, Gerard M. (2016) Religion Viewed from Different Sciences in: On Human Nature: Biology, Psychology, Ethics, Politics, and Religion by Michel Tibayrenc (Editor), Francisco J. Ayala (Editor), pp. 675–685.
- Verschuuren, Gerard M. (2017). 130 Excel Simulations in Action. Createspace, Charleston, SC ISBN 978-1978429871
- Verschuuren, Gerard M. (2017). 100 Excel VBA Simulations. Createspace, Charleston, SC ISBN 978-1540445179
- Verschuuren, Gerard M. (2017). The Holism-Reductionism Debate - In Physics, Genetics, Biology, Neuroscience, Ecology, Sociology. Createspace, Charleston, SC ISBN 978-1542888486
- Verschuuren, Gerard M. (2017). Faith and Reason - The Cradle of Truth. EnRoute Books, St. Louis, MO
- Verschuuren, Gerard M. (2017). Matters of Life and Death - A Catholic Guide to the Moral Dilemmas of Our Time. Angelico Press, Kettering, OH
- Verschuuren, Gerard M. (2018). Forty Anti-Catholic Lies. Sophia Institute Press, Manchester, NH
- Verschuuren, Gerard M. (2018). The Eclipse of God. EnRoute Books, St. Louis, MO
- Verschuuren, Gerard M. (2018). The Myth of an Anti-Science Church - Galileo, Darwin, Teilhard, Hawking, Dawkins. Angelico Press, Kettering, OH
- Verschuuren, Gerard M. (2019). In the Beginning: How God Made Earth Our Home. Sophia Institute Press, Manchester, NH
- Verschuuren, Gerard M. (2020). A Catholic Scientist Proves God Exists. Sophia Institute Press, Manchester, NH
- Verschuuren, Gerard M. (2020). At the Dawn of Humanity - The First Humans. Angelico Press, Kettering, OH
- Verschuuren, Gerard M. (2020). How Science Points to God. Sophia Institute Press, Manchester, NH
- Verschuuren, Gerard M. (2021). A Catholic Scientist Champions the Shroud of Turin. Sophia Institute Press, Manchester, NH
- Verschuuren, Gerard M. (2013). Videos on YouTube.

== Extended links ==
- Author's Website
- Where Do We Come From?
