= Hartknoch =

Hartknoch is a surname. Notable people with the surname include:

- Christoph Hartknoch (1644–1687), German historian
- Johann Friedrich Hartknoch (1740–1789), German publisher
