= Muster (Texas A&M University) =

Traditional ceremony at Texas A&M University

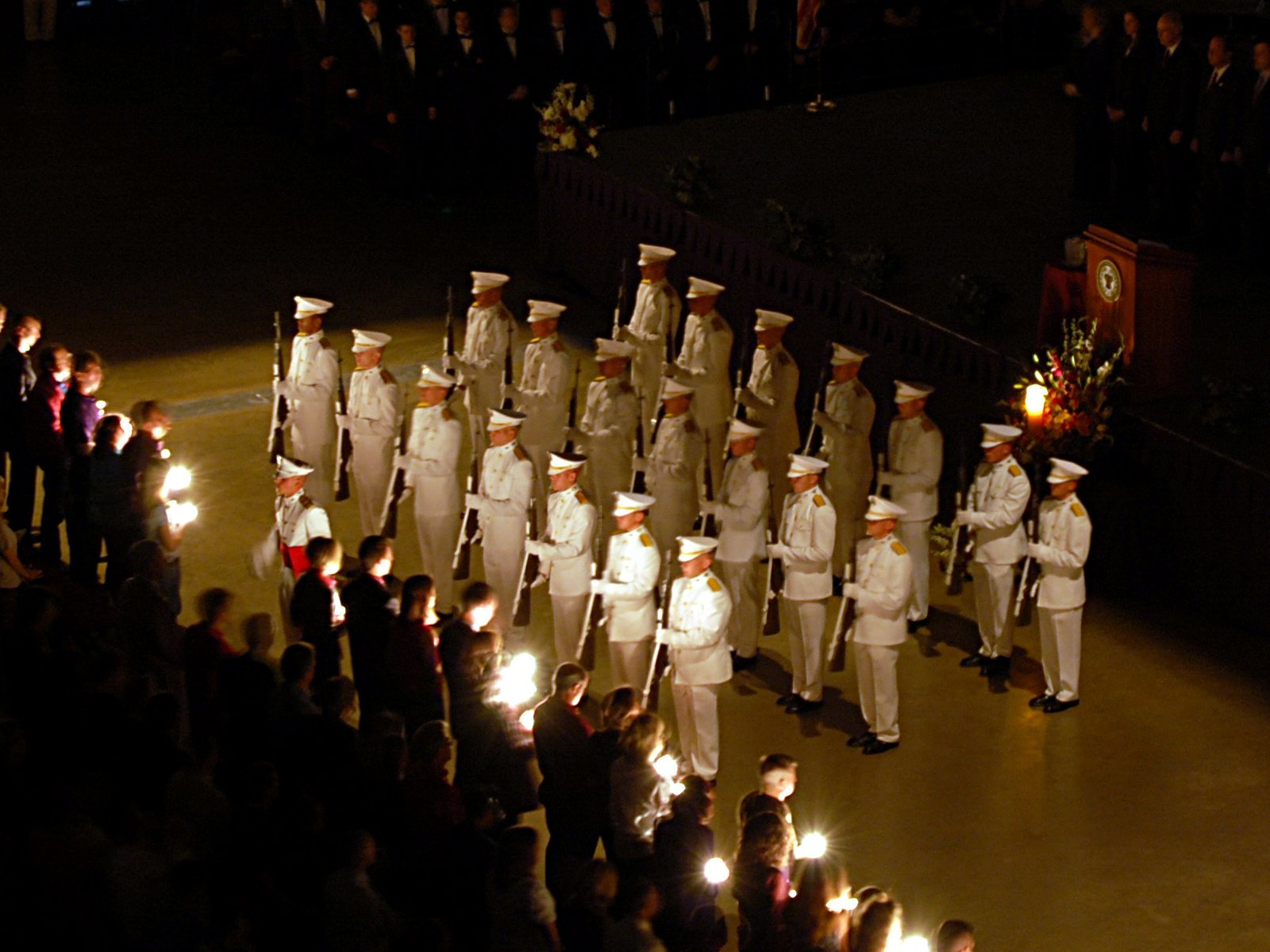
The 2007 Aggie Muster at Reed Arena: The Ross Volunteers stand at attention as candles are lit for the deceased

Aggie Muster is a tradition at Texas A&M University which celebrates the camaraderie of the university while remembering the lives of alumni who have died, specifically those in the past year. Muster officially began on April 21, 1903, as a day for remembrance of fellow Aggies. Muster ceremonies today take place in approximately 320 locations globally. The largest muster ceremony occurs in Reed Arena, on the Texas A&M campus. The "Roll Call for the Absent" commemorates Aggies, alumni and current students, who died that year. Alumni, family, and friends light candles and as they answer “here” when the name of their loved one is “called”. Campus muster also serves as a 50th-year class reunion for the corresponding graduating class. Some non-campus muster ceremonies do not include the pageantry of the campus ceremony, and might consist simply of a barbecue.

== Early years ==
On June 26, 1883, alumni of Texas A&M University gathered together to "live over again their college days, the victories and defeats won and lost upon the drill field and in the classroom." The same year, the Ex-Cadets Association established the "Roll Call for the Absent". The event grew into a loosely organized annual tradition, but did not have a permanent date set aside until several decades later, when it merged with a different tradition.

In 1889, Texas A&M administrators declared that April 21 (which in Texas is known as San Jacinto Day, the anniversary of the Battle of San Jacinto whereby Texas gained its independence from Mexico) would be an official school holiday. Each year on San Jacinto Day, the cadets would have a track and field competition. In 1903, then-A&M President David Houston encountered much student resistance to the idea of cancelling the holiday. Houston agreed to retain the holiday as long as the students promised to use it for constructive purposes.

Beginning April 21, 1903, the tradition of Aggie Muster merged with the Texas Independence celebration, featuring athletic events and banquets to honor alumni. For the next 15 years, the event would occur unchanged as a day of play, celebration and fellowship. In 1918, though, with many alumni away involved in World War I and unable to return to campus, A&M President Bizzell encouraged alumni and the student body to gather wherever they were on April 21, becoming the first Aggie administrator to officially support the tradition.

== A&M Day ==
In the early 1920s, as alumni returned from the war and settled throughout Texas, regional A&M clubs formed to reunite alumni. With the proliferation of these groups, the Muster tradition began to have a more formal atmosphere. In 1923, the student radio station WTAW broadcast a statewide program for over two dozen Aggie groups who had gathered at points across Texas. The March 1923 Texas Aggie urged, "If there is an A&M man in one-hundred miles of you, you are expected to get together, eat a little, and live over the days you spent at the A&M College of Texas."

The tradition of reading aloud the roll call of the dead began in 1924, with the addition of the tune "Taps" in 1927. The following year, 23 alumni were added to the roll call. During the Great Depression, alumni continued to celebrate April 21, calling it "A. and M. Day", and using the gathering to help raise money to support current students and alumni, as well as advancing job-placements.

== World War II ==
On Corregidor - 21 April 1946

In this hallowed soil lie the mortal remains of many men who have died that liberty might live. Among the bravest of these brave are twenty officers, sons of Texas A&M, unable themselves to answer this year's annual muster. It is for us, therefore, to do so for them -- to answer for them in clear and firm voice -- Dead on the battleswept Corregidor where their eternal spirit will never die but will march on forever, inspiring in those who follow the courage and the will to preserve well that for which they bled.

Of them and those of their fellow alumni who lie in hallowed soil of other lands and those who survive them, may it truly be said that in the noble teachings of their Alma Mater -- in the tradition of the great American leader, Sam Houston, who this day, one hundred and ten years ago, wrested Texas from foreign dominion by defeating Santa Ana on the historic battlefield of San Jacinto - they stood steadfast, unyielding and unafraid through those dark days of our country's gravest peril - and by inspiring example helped point the way.

— General Douglas MacArthur

The most well-known Aggie Muster took place during World War II in 1942 on the Philippine island of Corregidor at the entrance to Manila Bay. At this time, Corregidor was the last American stronghold against the Japanese forces in the Philippines, and Japanese artillery and warplanes were constantly attacking. The American artillery commander on Corregidor was Brigadier General George F. Moore, a 1908 graduate of Texas A&M. With the help of Major Tom Dooley, class of 1935, Moore gathered the names of 25 other Aggies under his command. Despite the fierce fighting as the Japanese laid siege to the island, on April 21, 1942, Moore held a roll call—known as muster in army terms—calling the names of each of the Aggies under his command.

Only 12 of the 25 survived the battle and the POW camps to which the survivors were sent. Dooley told a United Press correspondent about the gathering, and the reporter sent an article back to the USA about the 25 Aggies who had "Mustered". The story captured the imagination of the country and "helped boost American spirits at a time a lift was badly needed." Lt. Col. (Ret.) William A. Hamilton Jr., Class of 1940, recognized as the last living survivor of the "Muster on the Rock", died on January 4, 2018, at age 99.

Association of Former Students Executive Secretary E. E. McQuillen, Class of 1920, is credited with refocusing San Jacinto Day as a remembrance for fallen Aggies. He changed the April 21, 1943, celebration to be the first known as an Aggie Muster and sent packets to each A&M club, Aggie Moms club, and to US military bases around the world with a detailed program of events for April 21. It included greetings from the A&M President and a poem by Dr. John Ashton of A&M's class of 1906, which he had written at McQuillen's request. Entitled "The Heroes' Roll Call" and also known as the "Roll Call for the Absent", it also commemorates the 1942 Muster and is designed so that the number of years since 1942 can be inserted. The response was overwhelming, with 10,000 alumni worldwide mustering in 500 locations. The following year, McQuillen added a list of recently deceased Aggies to the packets, asking each local group to choose names from the list and call them aloud during their ceremony, and "as each name is called a comrade will answer 'Here'."

In April 1945, just eight weeks after the United States recaptured Corregidor, three Aggies conducted a Muster "on the Rock" and wrote letters home to McQuillen detailing the events. A year later, on April 21, 1946, an even larger Muster occurred on Corregidor as 128 Aggies gathered on the island from various posts for Muster and to remember their fallen comrades. They posed for a photograph at the mouth of the Malinta Tunnel with an improvised A&M flag made from a bed sheet, and the photograph became famous.

With the war now over, A&M held a special Victory Homecoming Muster on Easter morning in 1946. Over 15 thousand Aggies gathered at Kyle Field to listen to a speech by General Dwight D. Eisenhower. Lt. Col. Tom Dooley also presented the "Muster Tradition" and conducted a WWII Roll Call. To represent the 900 alumni who died in World War II, the names of the four deceased WWII Aggie Medal of Honor recipients were called.

Muster became a student organization in 1950, and students now coordinate all aspects of the campus Muster in College Station, Texas. On April 21, 2015, the university dedicated a monument on Corregidor designed by College of Architecture students.

== Modern Muster ==
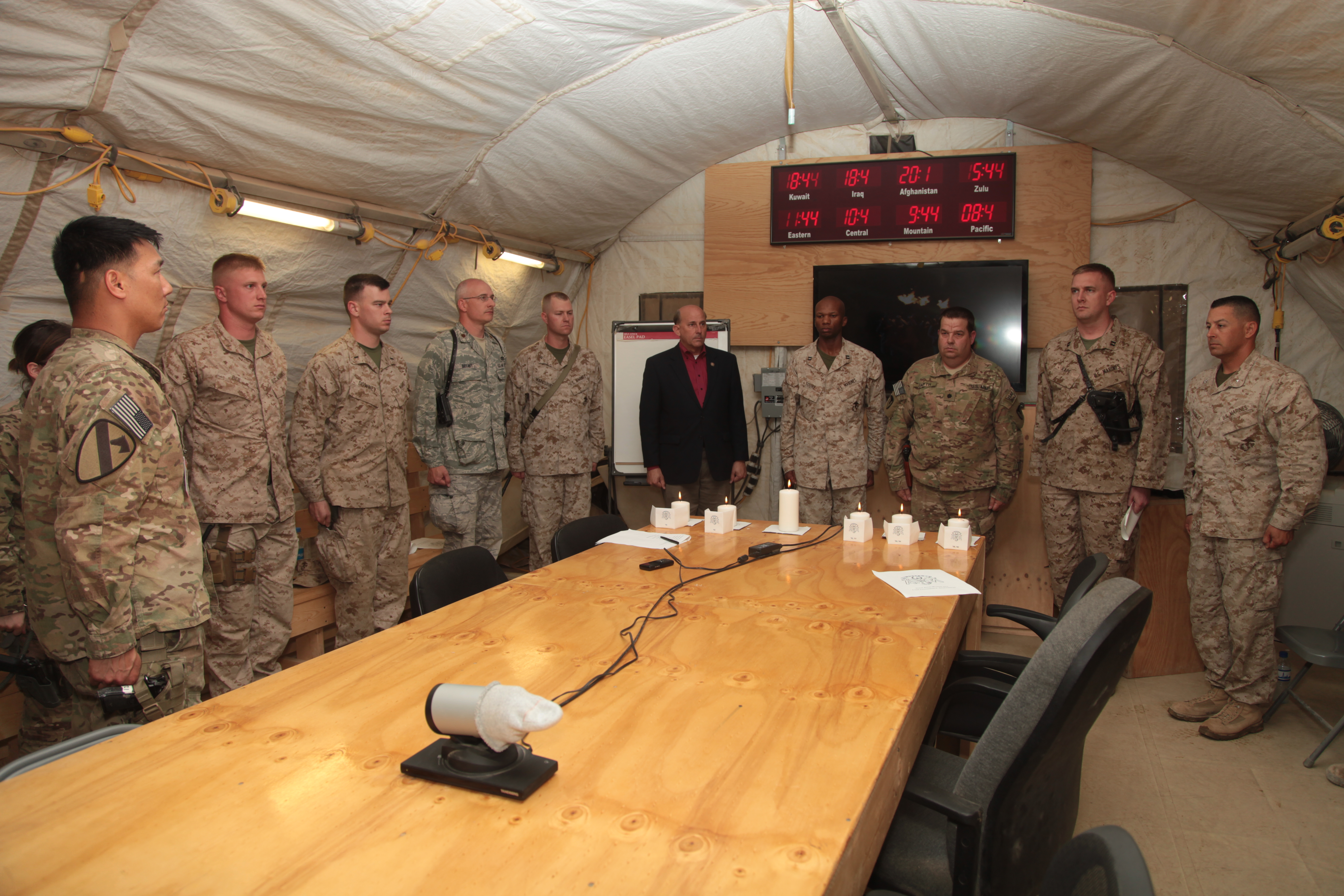
Muster at Camp Leatherneck, Afghanistan in 2012

Randy Matson, the keynote speaker at the 2000 campus Muster, vowed, "we're here (tonight) to pledge that none of you will be forgotten as long as there are two Aggies left in the world."

The largest Muster each year, with over 12,000 in attendance, is held in Reed Arena on the campus of Texas A&M University in College Station. This campus Muster is dedicated to the 50-year reunion class of that year, demonstrating unity among Aggies. During the day, a Camaraderie Barbecue is held at the Academic Plaza around noon to rekindle the spirit of the original Muster celebration. The evening Muster ceremony begins with a keynote speaker. Several poems are read, including "The Last Corps Trip", which imagines a Judgement Day in which Aggies are welcomed into Heaven with open arms: Following the 1999 Aggie Bonfire collapse, additional verses of "The Last Corps Trip" honoring those who died were written.

Following the readings, the room is darkened for the Roll Call of the Absent. This Roll Call honors alumni who have died since the last Muster. As the names are called, a family member or friend answers "Here", and lights a candle in remembrance of that person. Following the Roll Call, the Ross Volunteers perform a three-volley salute, and buglers play "Silver Taps", a version of the US military's melody of farewell.

Smaller Musters are held in over 300 other locations, including in Kosovo, Germany, Istanbul, Seoul, and almost every county in Texas. Names can be called at multiple Muster ceremonies. For example, a person may be honored at the Muster in his hometown, while the Muster in the town where his parents live may also choose to call his name. Most of the smaller Musters do not have the pageantry of the campus Muster. In all cases, a Roll Call for the Absent is held, but the ceremony may take place in conjunction with a barbecue or fish fry, to allow for fellowship.

In 2018, a Sunrise Muster has been added to the Campus Muster activities. In addition to the traditional muster activities, the name of every Aggie that died in the previous year, worldwide that year is read at the Clayton W. Williams Jr. Alumni Center at 6:51 am. This is to ensure that each alumna and each alumnus who has died in the preceding year will have someone say "here" for them. The event is streamed live on AggieNetwork.com.

== Keynote speakers (College Station) ==
- 2019 Dwight A. Roblyer '84
- 2018 Kathleen Gibson '81
- 2017 Eddie Joe Davis Jr. '67
- 2016 R.C. Slocum
- 2015 Will Hurd '99
- 2014 Bill Youngkin '69
- 2013 Bill Jones '81
- 2012 John R. Hoyle '57
- 2011 Toby Boenig '95
- 2010 Major Stephen G. Ruth '92
- 2009 Robert Gates
- 2008 John Adams '73
- 2007 Brooke Leslie Rollins '94
- 2006 Bill Carter ’69
- 2005 Clayton W. Williams ’54
- 2004 Jon L. Hagler ’58
- 2003 Edwin H. Cooper ’53
- 2002 Gov. James R. “Rick” Perry ’72
- 2001 Dr. Joe West ’54
- 2000 Randy Matson ’67
- 1999 Mike Baggett '68
- 1998 Eugene Clifton Stallings, Jr. ’57
- 1997 H. B. Zachry, Jr. ’54
- 1996 E. Dean Gage ’65
- 1995 Lee Phillips ’53
- 1994 Andres Tijerina ’67
- 1993 Jack G. Fritts ’53
- 1992 Frank W. Cox III ’65
- 1991 Adm. Jerome L. Johnson ’56
- 1990 M. L. “Red” Cashion ’53
- 1989 Thomas Chester "Chet" Edwards ’74
- 1988 Gerald D. Griffin ’56
- 1987 Robert L. Walker ’58
- 1986 A. W. “Head” Davis ’45
- 1985 Lt. Gen. Ormond R. Simpson ’36
- 1984 Jack M. Rains ’60
- 1983 Haskell M. Monroe
- 1982 William B. Heye, Sr. ’60
- 1981 Frederick D. McClure ’76
- 1980 Henry G. Cisneros ’68
- 1979 Lee H. Smith ’57
- 1978 Col. Tom Dooley ’35
- 1977 Maj. James E. Ray ’63
- 1976 Charles G. Scruggs ’47
- 1975 Reagan V. Brown ’43
- 1974 Sheldon J. Best ’63
- 1973 Capt. James E. Ray ’63
- 1972 Larry Kirk ’66
- 1971 Jack K. Williams
- 1970 Yale B. Griffis ’30
- 1969 Mayo J. Thompson ’41
- 1968 Maj. Gen. Wood B. Kyle ’36
- 1967 Maj. Gen. Raymond L. Murray ’35
- 1966 Penrose B. Metcalfe ’16
- 1965 C. Darrow Hooper ’53
- 1964 E. King Gill ’24
- 1963 L. F. Peterson ’36
- 1962 Eli L. Whiteley ’41
- 1961 James W. Aston ’33
- 1960 Lt. Gen. A. D. Bruce ’16
- 1959 Olin E. “Tiger” Teague ’32
- 1958 Gen. Bernard A. Schriever ’31
- 1957 No Campus Muster due to Easter recess
- 1956 Maj. Gen. James Earl Rudder ’32
- 1955 Gen. Otto P. Weyland ’28
- 1954 Texas Governor Allan Shivers
- 1953 Colorado Governor Daniel I.J. Thornton
- 1952 Searcy Bracewell ’38
- 1951 James H. Pipkin ’29
- 1950 Gen. Louis Henturvey ’29
- 1949 James W. Aston ’33
- 1948 A. E. “Red” Hinman ’25
- 1947 Lt. Col. Lewis B. Chevaillier ’39
- 1946 General Dwight D. Eisenhower
- 1945 Lt. Clifton H. Chamberlain ’40
- 1944 E. E. McQuillen ’20
