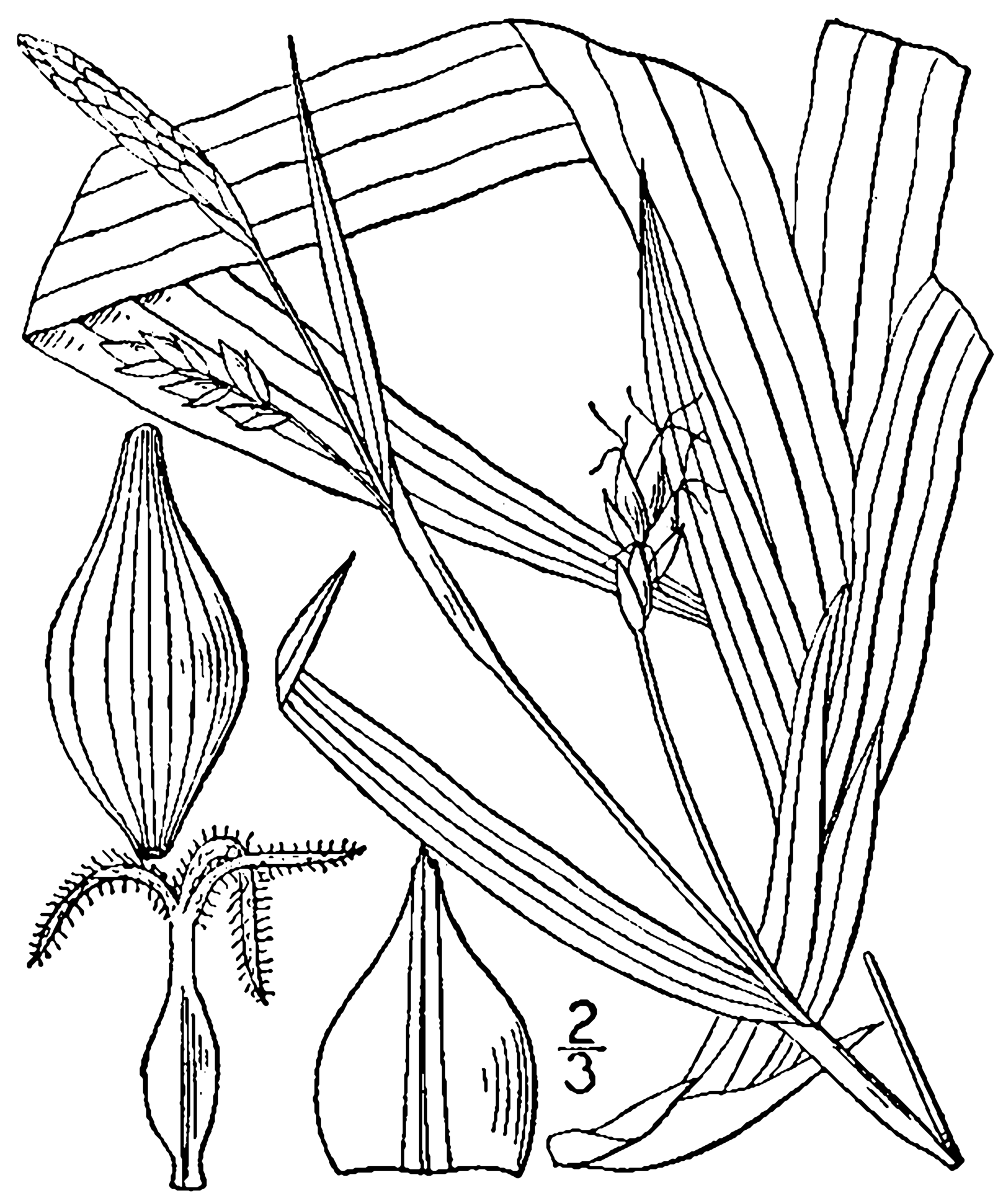

Scientific classification
- Kingdom: Plantae
- Clade: Tracheophytes
- Clade: Angiosperms
- Clade: Monocots
- Clade: Commelinids
- Order: Poales
- Family: Cyperaceae
- Genus: Carex
- Subgenus: Carex subg. Carex
- Section: Carex sect. Careyanae
- Species: C. careyana

Binomial name
- Carex careyana Torr. ex Dewey

Synonyms
- Carex heterostachya Torr.

= Carex careyana =

Species of grass-like plant

Carex careyana, commonly known as Carey's sedge, is a species of sedge found in the eastern United States and Ontario, Canada. It is named in honour of John Carey.

Its natural habitat is nutrient-rich moist forests, often on rocky calcareous slopes, and around outcrops such as caves or sinkholes. It is a conservative species, only being found in intact natural communities.

It can be distinguished from other Carex in section Careyanae by its combination of purple leaf bases, broad basal leaves, long leaf-like bracts on the culm, and relatively large perigynia. It produces flowers and fruits in spring.

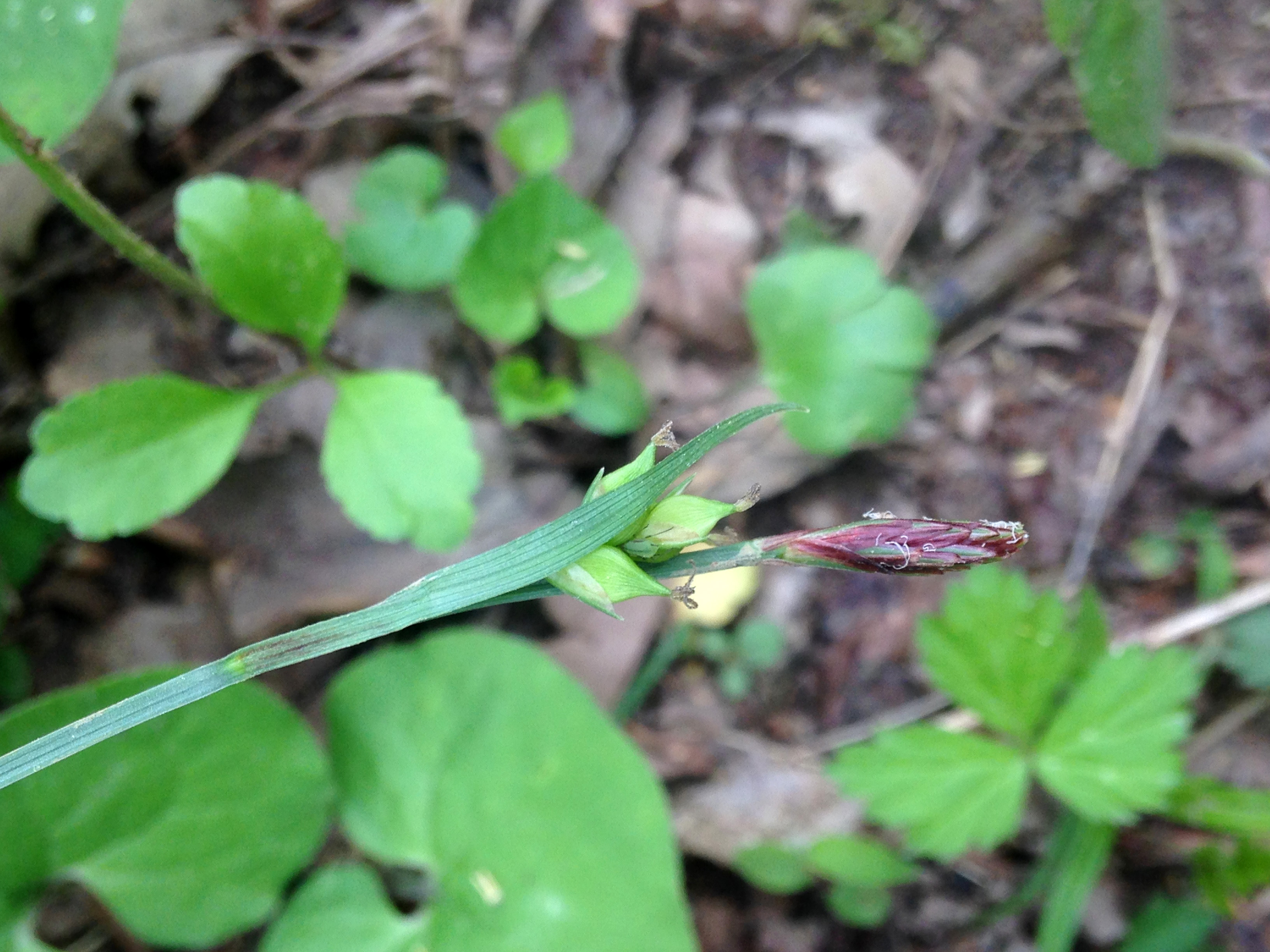
Detail of flowers and fruit
