= Johann Friedrich Hartknoch =

German publisher (1740–1789)

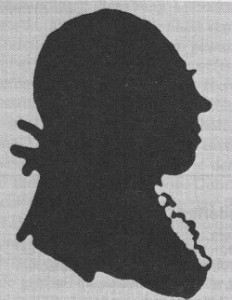
Silhouette depicting Johann Friedrich Hartknoch

Johann Friedrich Hartknoch (sometimes referred to as Johann Friedrich Hartknoch the Elder to distinguish him from his son; 28 September 1740 – 1 April 1789) was a Baltic German book publisher. He came from a poor family in Gołdap and took up work at the firm of a publisher and book trader while he was a student at the University of Königsberg. In 1762, he established his own business in Jelgava and soon afterwards moved to Riga.

In Riga, at the time part of the Russian Empire, he developed an important book trade and publishing business. Thanks to the comparatively tolerant regime under Catherine the Great, he could bring German books from cities like Leipzig and Berlin to the Russian Empire and also publish and sell works by Russian writers such as Mikhail Lomonosov and Nikolay Karamzin on a European market. Arguably more important was his work as publisher of German literature and Enlightenment philosophy. The first editions of Immanuel Kant's Critique of Pure Reason (1781) and Johann Gottfried Herder's Ideas upon Philosophy and the History of Mankind (1784–1791) were published by Hartknoch, in addition to works by several other German-language authors.

Hartknoch died in 1789. His son would continue running the publishing business in Riga. However, the new Emperor Paul I of Russia in 1797 forbade the sale of books printed outside Russia that had not undergone censorship, forcing the company to leave Russia. The publishing company was set up again in Leipzig, where it would remain in business until 1879.

== Biography ==
=== Early life ===
Hartknoch was born in Gołdap, at the time known in German as Goldap and part of the Kingdom of Prussia. He was the son of an organist and town musician. He grew up under modest or even poor circumstances. The headmaster of his school however convinced the family that he had potential to pursue higher studies, and he enrolled in the University of Königsberg in 1755 to study theology and law.

As a student in Königsberg, he was obliged to provide his own means to finance his studies and expenses, and so began to work for Johann Jakob Kanter, a publisher and book trader who supplied books for the intellectuals of the city. Tradition claims that it was philosopher Johann Gottfried Herder, a fellow student, who recommended Hartknoch to take up the book trade. Eventually, Hartknoch dropped his studies and concentrated on his work for Kanter. In 1761, when Kanter was away on a trip, Hartknoch was entrusted with running the business in Königsberg, and in 1762 Kanter asked Hartknoch to open a branch in Jelgava (at the time known as Mitau and part of the Duchy of Courland and Semigallia). Soon after having settled in Jelgava, Hartknoch took over the business there and began operating independently.

=== Move to Riga and subsequent success as publisher and book trader ===
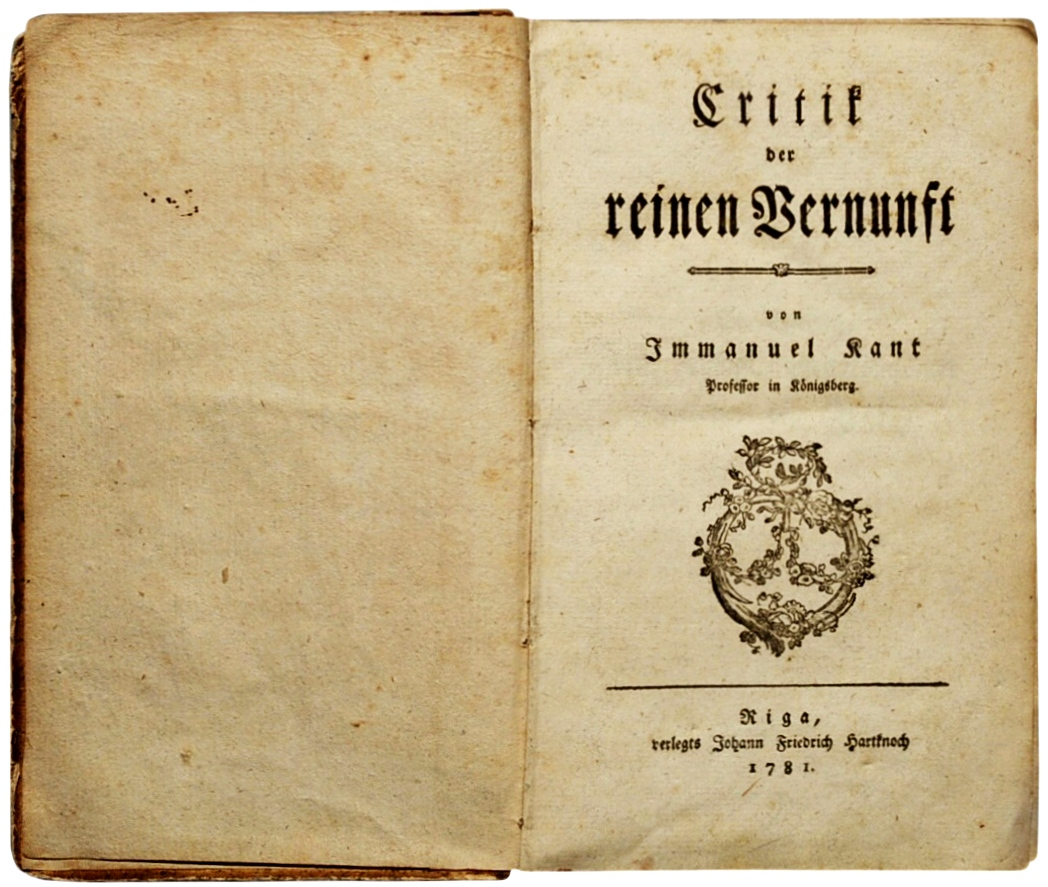
First edition of Immanuel Kant's seminal Critique of Pure Reason (1781), published by Hartknoch

In 1767 Hartknoch moved his business to Riga (at the time part of the Russian Empire), which was then the largest city of the Baltic region. His book trading and publishing business there developed into a centre for the publication of regional literature; he has been called "the first real bookseller in Livonia". It also served as an important intellectual bridge, providing German-language books Hartknoch brought from German cities like Leipzig and Berlin to the region and the wider Russian Empire. A catalogue of books sold by Hartknoch's firm published three years after his death (when his son was running the business) lists works not only in German but also in French, English and Spanish. Hartknoch also developed a network of representatives selling books from his firm in Tartu (Dorpat), Tallinn (Reval), Saaremaa (Ösel), Moscow and Saint Petersburg. Furthermore, Hartknoch's business served to supply Europe with books published in Russia. These included linguistic works, which helped spread the knowledge of the Russian language in Europe, but also literary works, such as books by Mikhail Lomonosov, Nikolay Karamzin and Gerhard Friedrich Müller. He also published some books in the Latvian language. Hartknoch's activities were possible due to the comparatively tolerant Russian regime under Catherine the Great. Notably, the physical printing of books under Hartknoch's label were actually carried out in German cities, not in Riga.

The arguably most lasting impact of Hartknoch was however his work as a publisher of German literature and Enlightenment philosophy. During his years in Königsberg, he had become personal friends with Immanuel Kant, Johann Gottfried Herder and Johann Georg Hamann. Herder had for example helped convince Hartknoch to move to Riga. Among the important German works published by Hartknoch can be noted the first editions of Kant's Critique of Pure Reason (1781) and Herder's Ideas upon Philosophy and the History of Mankind (1784–1791). Other German and Baltic German authors which were published by Hartknoch were Johann Georg Eisen von Schwarzenberg, Jakob Benjamin Fischer, Friedrich Konrad Gadebusch, August Wilhelm Hupel, Heinrich Johann von Jannau, Friedrich Maximilian von Klinger and Gotthard Friedrich Stender.

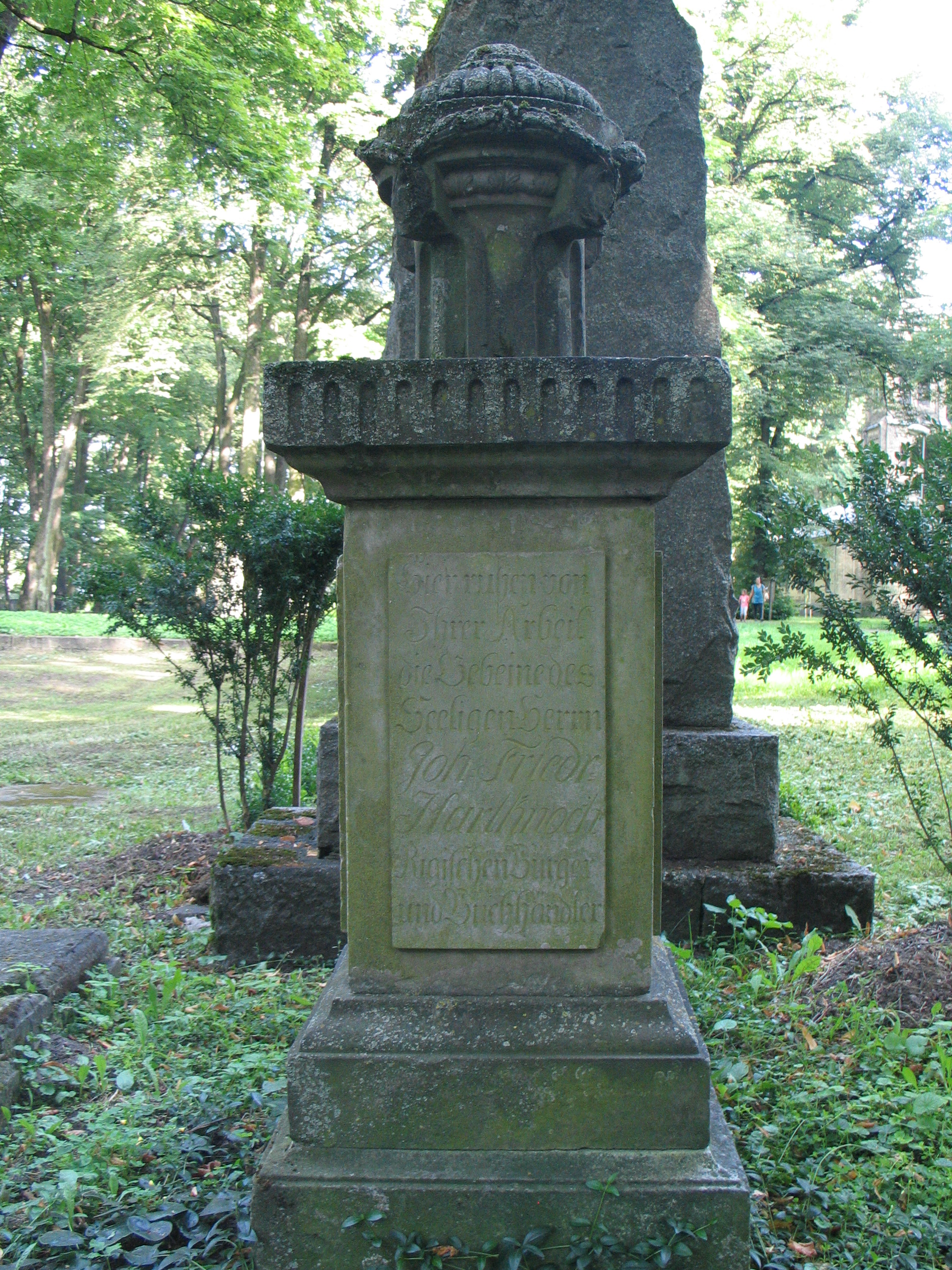
The grave of Johann Friedrich Hartknoch in Riga

Hartknoch was initiated into the regular Masonic Lodge "Zum Schwert" in Riga.

He died in Riga in 1789, partly due to exhaustion from a life of strenuous work. His son, also named Johann Friedrich, would continue running the business in Riga. During his time as head of the publishing company, the first accurate atlas of the provinces of Livonia and Estonia, compiled by Ludwig August Mellin, was published. However, the new Emperor Paul I of Russia in 1797 forbade the sale of books printed outside Russia which had not undergone censorship. While attempting to get clearance for a shipment of books in 1798, the younger Hartknoch was arrested. Soon thereafter, he left Russia and settled in Thuringia, and the publishing company was set up again in Leipzig. It would remain in business in Leipzig until 1879.
