= James Rae =

James Rae may refer to:

- Jimmy Rae (died 1958), Scottish football player and manager (Partick Thistle, Plymouth Argyle)
- Jim Rae (basketball) (1917–2013), American professional basketball player
- James Rae (surgeon) (1716–1791), Scottish surgeon
- James Rae, actor in The Paperboy (1994 film)
- Jim Rae, radio host on CBW (AM)

== See also ==
- James Ray (disambiguation)
- John Rae (footballer, born 1862), Scottish footballer for Third Lanark, Sunderland Albion, Scotland – sometimes misidentified as Jim Rae
