= Abnousse Shalmani =

French journalist and writer (born 1977)

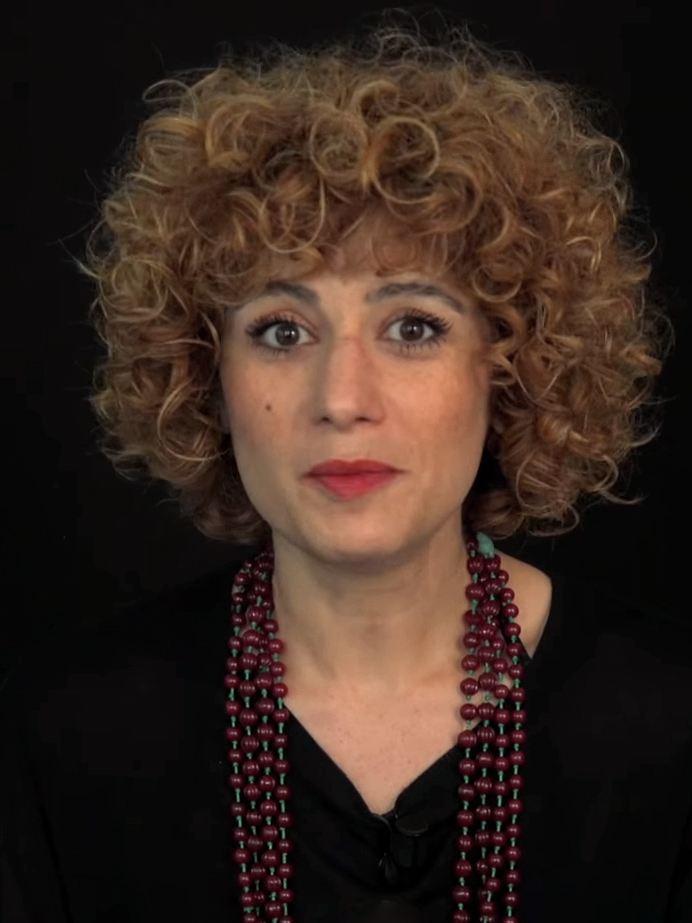
- Shalmani in 2018.
- Born: Abnousse Vafaei Shalmani; April 1, 1977 (age 49); Tehran, Iran
- Occupations: Author; director; journalist

Abnousse Shalmani (born April 1, 1977) is a French journalist, writer and director.

In 2018, Shalmani was one of the authors — along with Sarah Chiche, Catherine Millet, Peggy Sastre and Catherine Robbe-Grillet — of the open letter criticizing the MeToo movement which was signed by over 100 high-profile French women and sent to leading French newspaper, Le Monde. The letter advocated, in part, that a "freedom to bother [a woman]" – a man's right to make a pass at a woman, even if a clumsy one – was "indispensable to sexual freedom".

== Works ==
=== Books ===
- Shalmani, Abnousse (2014). Khomeiny, Sade et moi [Khomeiny, Sade and me] (in French). Paris: Éditions Grasset. ISBN 978-2-24685-207-0.
- Shalmani, Abnousse (2018). Les exilés meurent aussi d'amour (in French). Paris: Éditions Grasset. ISBN 978-2-24686-233-8.
- Shalmani, Abnousse (2019). Éloge du métèque (in French). Paris: Éditions Grasset. ISBN 978-2-24682-135-9.
- Shalmani, Abnousse (2024). J’ai péché, péché dans le plaisir (in French). Paris: Éditions Grasset. ISBN 978-2-24681-545-7.
- Shalmani, Abnousse (2024). Laïcité j’écris ton nom (in French). Paris: Éditions de l'Observatoire. ISBN 979-1-03293-293-3.
