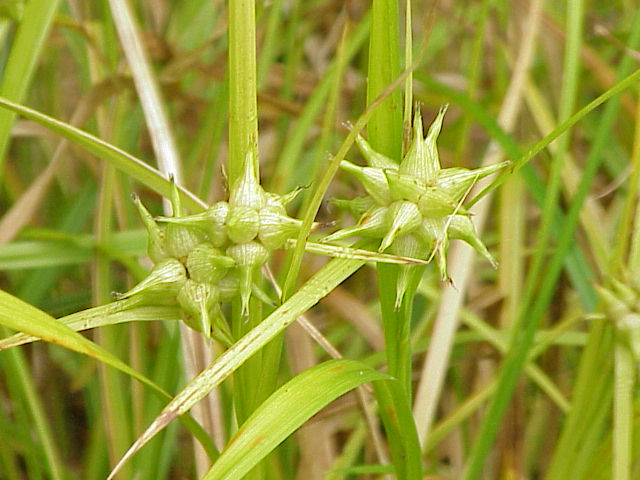

Conservation status
- Secure (NatureServe)

Scientific classification
- Kingdom: Plantae
- Clade: Tracheophytes
- Clade: Angiosperms
- Clade: Monocots
- Clade: Commelinids
- Order: Poales
- Family: Cyperaceae
- Genus: Carex
- Species: C. grayi

Binomial name
- Carex grayi J.Carey, 1848

= Carex grayi =

Species of grass-like plant

Carex grayi, the mace sedge, is a species of flowering plant in the sedge family, Cyperaceae. It is native to eastern North America, and has been introduced to western Europe.
