= Peggy Sastre =

French science journalist, translator, and essayist

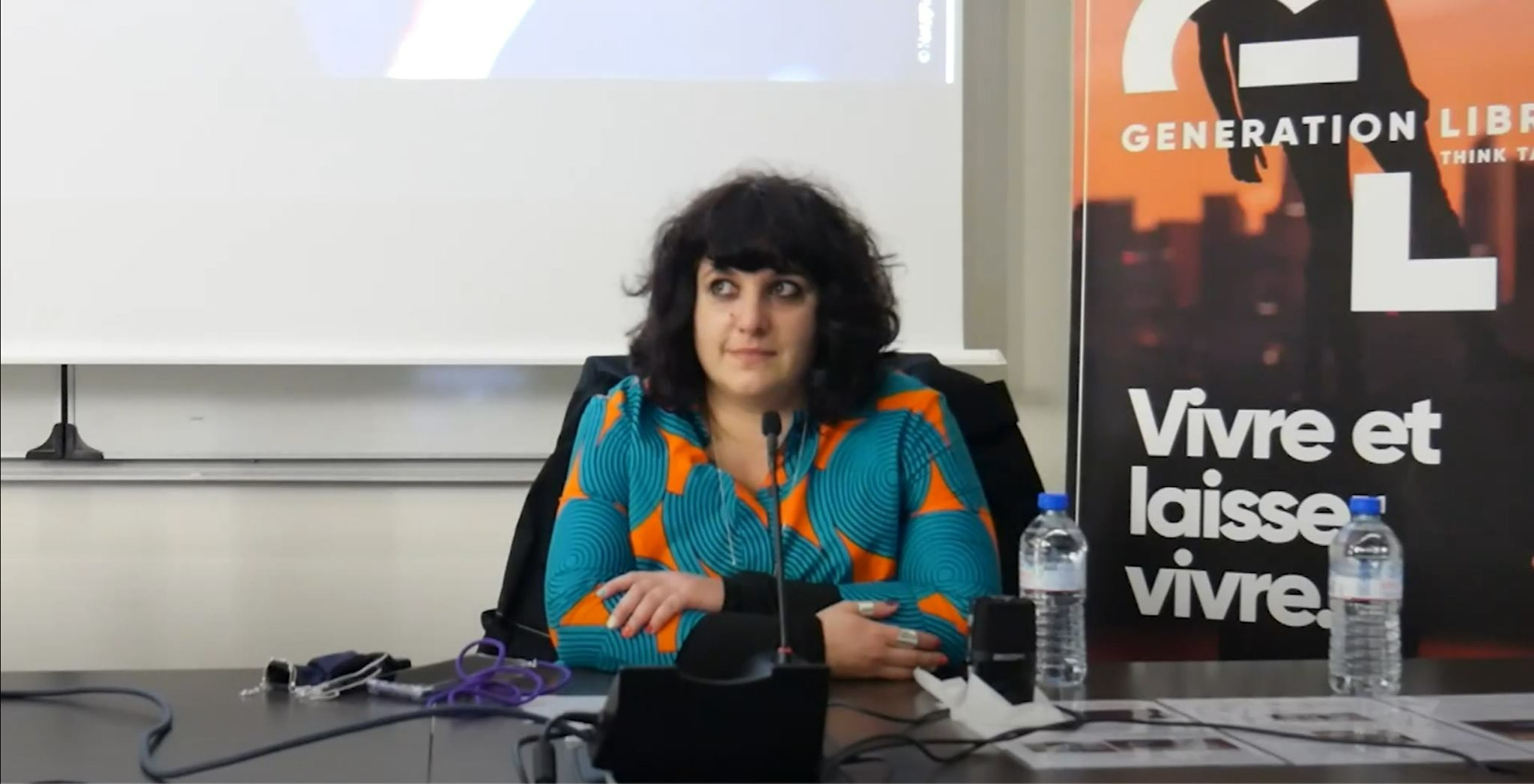
- Sastre in 2021
- Occupation: Journalist

Peggy Sastre (born 1981) is a French science journalist, translator, blogger and essayist. She is a Doctor of Philosophy who worked on Nietzsche and Darwin.

She forms the concept of “evofeminism”, offering a biological and evolutionary reading of sexual and gender issues.

Sastre was one of the authors along with Abnousse Shalmani of the open letter criticising #MeToo sent to the leading French newspaper, Le Monde, signed by over 100 high-profile French women. The letter advocated in part that a "freedom to bother" — a man's right to make a pass at a woman, even if a clumsy one — was "indispensable to sexual freedom".

== Publications ==
- No Sex, avoir envie de ne pas faire l'amour, Éditions La Musardine, Paris, 2010 ISBN 978-2842713928
