= Arthur Jaczewski =

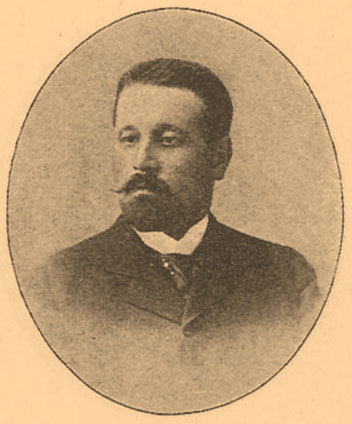

Arthur Louis Arthurovič de Jaczewski also as Artur Arturovich Yachevsky (Russian: Арту́р Арту́рович Яче́вский; 3 November 1863 – 12 February 1932) was a Russian biologist who was involved in studies on plant pathogenic fungi (particularly rusts and mildews) and was involved in the application of phytopathology to agronomy. The genera Jaczewskia and Jaczewskiella are named after him. His son Petr Arturovich Jaczewski (1908-1942) was also a mycologist.

== Life and work ==
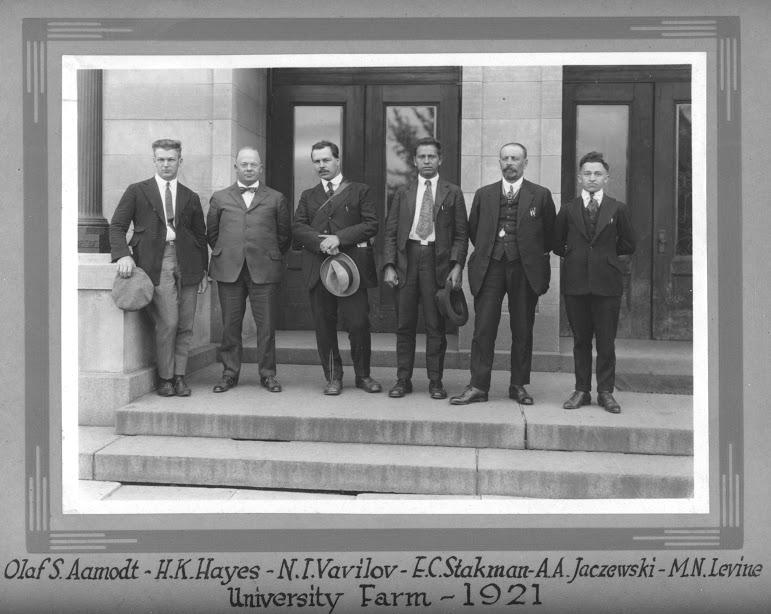
Vavilov, Jaczewski and others in the University of Minnesota, 1921

Yachevsky was born in Rylkovo village, Smolensk Province and came from an old noble family in the Kiev region with origins in eastern Mazovia. Around 1419 Peter of Lisov had been gifted land to found a place called Jachevo north of Korytnitsa from which the surname was derived. Yachevsky was educated in Switzerland at Lausanne and at the University of Bern, studying under Eduard Fischer. He travelled in France, Italy and Algeria before moving back to Russia in 1895 and worked at the St. Petersburg botanical garden from 1896. Here he established a phytopathology laboratory. From 1895 until 1899 he was co-editor of the exsiccata Fungi Rossiae exsiccati. In 1897 he examined grape diseases caused by fungi in the Caucasus region. In 1905 he left the laboratory and began to work at his own home. In 1907 he organized a bureau of mycology and phytopathology. After the Russian revolution the bureau became a part of the All Union Research Institute of Plant Protection (VASKHNIL). In 1921 he visited the US and Canada along with, his then student, Nikolai Vavilov. He published over 500 papers including the first comprehensive list of Myxomycetes in 1907 and was the only list until 1993.
