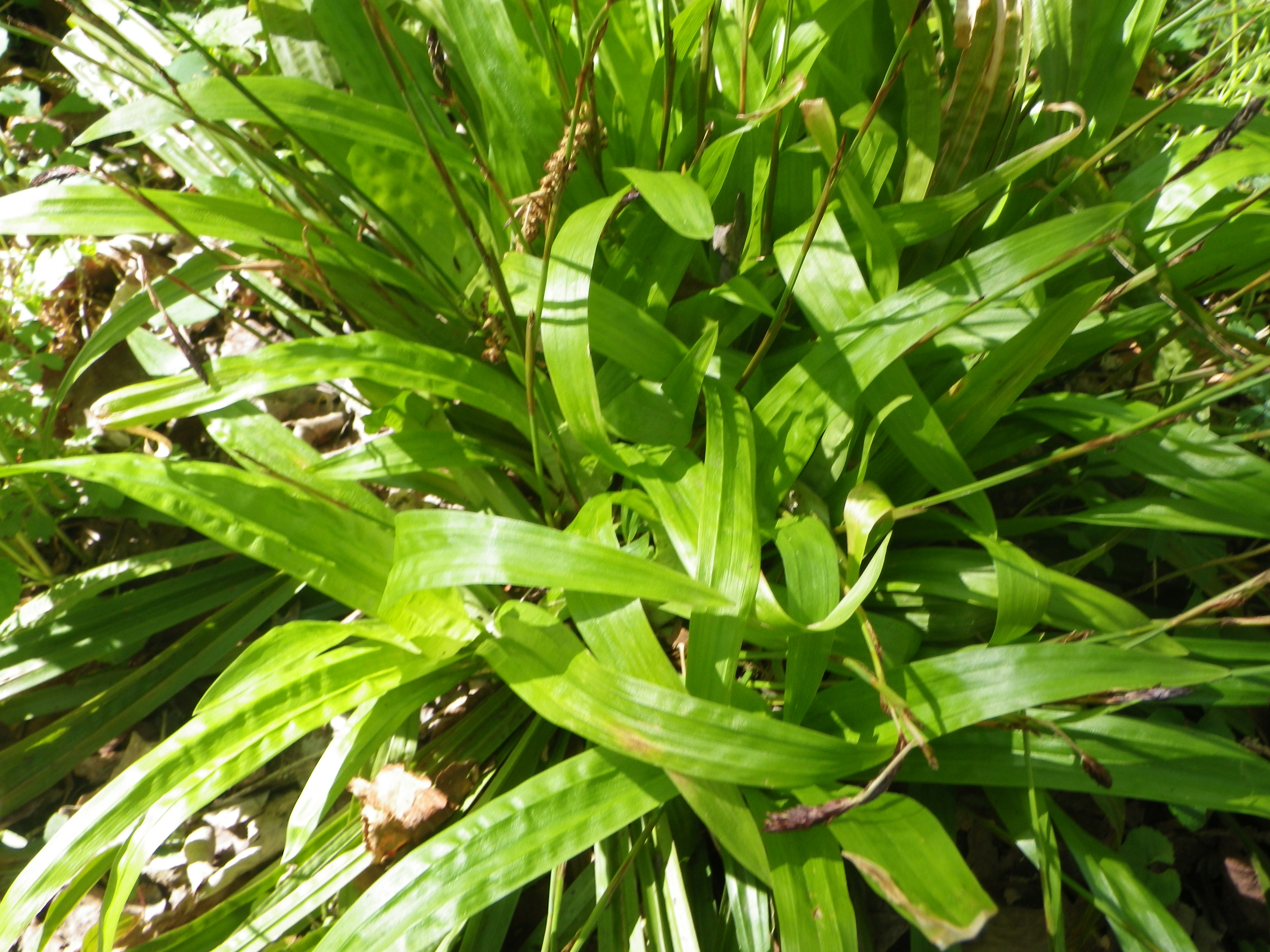

Conservation status
- Secure (NatureServe)

Scientific classification
- Kingdom: Plantae
- Clade: Tracheophytes
- Clade: Angiosperms
- Clade: Monocots
- Clade: Commelinids
- Order: Poales
- Family: Cyperaceae
- Genus: Carex
- Species: C. plantaginea

Binomial name
- Carex plantaginea Lam.

= Carex plantaginea =

Species of grass-like plant

Carex plantaginea, commonly known as carex plantain, plaintainleaf sedge, or seersucker sedge, is a perennial herb of the sedge family.

== Description ==
It grows up to 0.9 metres (2 ft 11 in) tall. It is distributed across much of eastern North America, from New Brunswick to Georgia, west to Minnesota and Iowa.
