= Marius Jeuken =

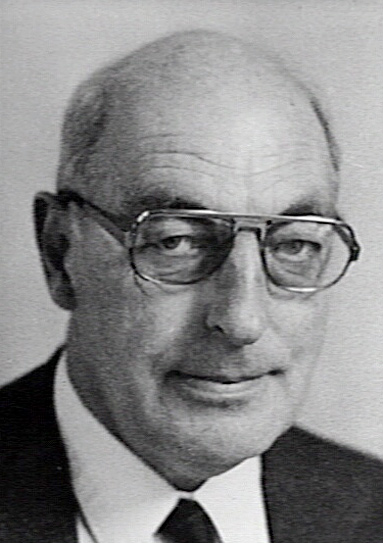
- Born: 26 January 1916; The Hague
- Died: 24 March 1983 (aged 67); Oegstgeest
- Education: Leiden University
- Occupation: Professor of Biology
- Scientific career
- Fields: Biology, Theoretical Biology, Philosophy of Biology

Marius Jeuken (26 January 1916 - 24 March 1983) was professor of theoretical biology at the Institute of Theoretical Biology at Leiden University in the Netherlands, from 1968 until his death. Jeuken was also a member of the Society of Jesus; he joined the Dutch Jesuits in 1934 and was ordained a Catholic priest in 1946 in Maastricht.

== Background ==
In 1953 Leiden University started a section Theoretical Biology within the department of Zoology under the direction of the mathematical biologist H.R. van der Vaart. In 1957 this section was transformed into an Institute with Van der Vaart as its Professor. But in 1961 he moved to Raleigh, North Carolina.

In 1966, the institute attracted Evert Meelis as a statistical consultant and invited Marius Jeuken to direct the institute, after he had been teaching biology at the Gadjah Mada University of Yogyakarta (Indonesia). He had been trained as an animal physiologist, and had defended his thesis under supervision of C. J. van der Klaauw at Leiden University.

In the same year, 1966, Jeuken became Professor by special appointment to teach philosophy at the Landbouwhogeschool in Wageningen, a position he held until 1971.

In 1968, Jeuken was given a Professorship in Philosophical Biology. For at least half of his time he was dedicated to do experimental research so his theoretical biology would not lose contact with reality. One of his specific interests was how biology could benefit from the philosophy developed by the mathematician and philosopher Alfred North Whitehead at Harvard University. It inspired one of his students, Gerard Verschuuren, to further expand on this issue (on Hemostatic Regulation).

His institute has always had strong historical ties with the Prof. Dr. Jan van der Hoeven Foundation, which is still the publisher of Acta Biotheoretica, the oldest journal of theoretical biology in the world. For years, Jeuken acted as its Editor-in-Chief, until he died in 1983.

== Articles in English ==
- The biological and philosophical definitions of life, Acta biotheoretica, 24 (1975), 14–21.
- Remarks on the Is-Ought problem. In Science and absolute values. London, 1974, 1059–1062.
- Commentary on G. Stent's paper: structuralism and biology. In Science and absolute values. London, 1974, 858–862.
- A note on models and explanation in biology, Acta biotheoretica, 18 (1969), 284–290.
- The study of animal behaviour, Medan ilmu pengetahuan, (1961), 247–259.
- Philosophy and theoretical science, Laporan kongres ilmu pengetahuan nasional pertama. Djakarta, 1958, 95–114.
- Function in biology, Acta biotheoretica, (1958), 29–46.

== Extended links ==
- A listing of his publications
- Acta Biotheoretica
- A History of the Institute by J.A.J. Metz
- Prof. Dr. Jan van der Hoeven Foundation for Theoretical Biology of Animal and Man
- Announcement of the Foundation for Theoretical Biology at Leyden, in Nature, 136, 99-99 (20 July 1935)
