= Joseph Edward Little =

- Born: 1861
- Died: 1935 (aged 73–74)
- Scientific career
- Fields: Botany

Joseph Edward Little (1861–1935) was a botanist and teacher who collected samples from the families Ulmaceae (elms and zelkovas), Papaveraceae (poppies), and Betulaceae (birches) in England, Scotland and Ireland. Samples he collected are housed in the North Hertfordshire Museum and at the Kew Library and Archives of the Royal Botanic Gardens. He collaborated with Margaret Sibella Brown collecting samples.
