= James Davis Ray Jr. =

American botanist (1918–1990)

- Born: May 5, 1918; Starkville, Mississippi, US
- Died: February 16, 1990 (aged 71); Temple Terrace, Florida, US
- Education: Mississippi State University; University of Illinois
- Scientific career
- Fields: Botany
- Workplaces: Mississippi State University; University of South Florida
- Author abbrev. (botany): J.D.Ray

James Davis Ray Jr. (1918–1990) was an American botanist, herbarium director, and college dean.

In 1939 James Davis Ray, Jr., graduated with a bachelor's degree in botany from Mississippi State University. In 1951 he graduated with a Ph.D. in botany from the University of Illinois, where George Neville Jones was one of the professors. In 1956 Ray published a monograph on the genus Lysimachia in the western hemisphere.

As a faculty member at Mississippi State University, Ray met the botanist George Ralph Cooley (1896–1986), who later invited him to work at the University of South Florida (USF). In 1959 Ray was the first USF faculty member hired, a year before the first classes were held. In 1960 he became the first director of the USF Herbarium. He collected thousands of botanical specimens for the Herbarium. He was appointed USF's Dean of the College of Natural Sciences. By the mid-1960s his work at USF was almost entirely in administration. He retired from USF in 1983.

In Oktibbeha County, Mississippi on November 21, 1946, he married Dorothy Ernestine Burkett (1923–2015).
