= Inés Sastre de Jesús =

Puerto Rican botanist

- Awards: Sullivant Award (2009)

Academic background
- Education: Pontifical Catholic University of Puerto Rico (undergraduate) University of Tennessee (masters) City University of New York (doctoral)

Inés Sastre de Jesús (born 1955 in Santurce, Puerto Rico) is a Puerto Rican botanist and plant taxonomist specializing in bryophytes. She has served as editor of the Caribbean Journal of Science, and the liverwort Neurolejeunea sastreana was named for her in honor of her many contributions to bryology.

== Education ==
Inés studied biology at the Pontifical Catholic University of Puerto Rico, graduating in 1975 with a bachelors of science. She completed a master’s degree of science in Ecology at the University of Tennessee in 1979, completing a master’s thesis entitled “Ecological life cycle of Buchenavia capitata (Vahl.) Eichl., a late successional species in the rainforest of Puerto Rico”. In 1987 she obtained her PhD at the City University of New York in Biology with a thesis entitled " A Revision of the Neckeraceae Schimp. and Thamnobryaceae Marg. & Dur. in the Neotropics”. From 1990 to 1991, Inés was a Ford Foundation postdoctoral fellow at the International Institute of Tropical Forestry in Río Piedras, Puerto Rico. She completed her academic training as a postdoctoral fellow at the University of Puerto Rico, Río Piedras. As of February 2025, she has four publications on "semantic scholar.org" titled "Preliminary studies on bryophyte communities on decaying logs in the subtropical rainforest of Puerto Rico," "A Guide for Biology Teachers," "Bryophytes as indicators of disturbances," and "Catalog of mosses of the department of Antioquia, Colombia." She also coauthored an article titled "The effect of pH on in vitro growth of protonemata, asexual propagules, or gametophytes fragments of four Neotropical moss species" published in Bryophyte Diversity and Evolution, and an article titled "Kandiyohi County Master Gardener Inés Sastre-De Jesús reflects on season" in the West Central Tribune.
