= James Edwin Ray =

American Air Force officer

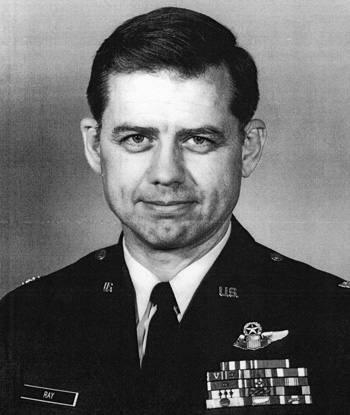
- James Edwin Ray, U.S. Air Force
- Born: August 25, 1941 (age 85); Longview, Texas
- Military career
- Allegiance: United States of America
- Branch: United States Air Force
- Service years: 1964–1990
- Rank: Colonel
- Unit: 469th Tactical Fighter Squadron
- Conflicts: Vietnam War
- Awards: Silver Star; Legion of Merit; Purple Heart; Prisoner of War Medal

James Edwin Ray (born August 25, 1941) was a United States Air Force officer and fighter pilot. He was awarded the Silver Star for his selflessness and courage in the face of great danger.

== Biography ==
James E. Ray graduated from Texas A&M University in 1964. For two years, he flew F-105 fighter bombers in the U.S. Air Force. On his 11th combat mission, on May 8, 1966, Ray had to eject over North Vietnam and was immediately captured. He was decorated for his resistance to his captors and developing techniques for his fellow prisoners to resist his captors. He was not released until February 12, 1973.

=== Awards and decorations ===
US Air Force Command Pilot Badge

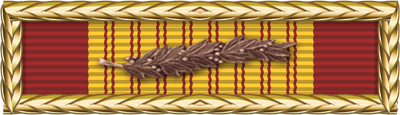
Silver Star
Legion of Merit with bronze oak leaf cluster
Bronze Star Medal with Valor device and bronze oak leaf cluster
Purple Heart with bronze oak leaf cluster
Defense Meritorious Service Medal
Meritorious Service Medal
Air Medal
Air Force Outstanding Unit Award with bronze oak leaf cluster
Prisoner of War Medal
National Defense Service Medal
Vietnam Service Medal with silver and three bronze service stars
Air Force Overseas Short Tour Service Ribbon with silver and bronze oak leaf clusters
Air Force Overseas Long Tour Service Ribbon
Air Force Longevity Service Award with silver oak leaf cluster
Small Arms Expert Marksmanship Ribbon
Air Force Training Ribbon
Order of National Security Merit, Tong-il Medal
Vietnam Gallantry Cross Unit Award
Vietnam Campaign Medal
