= Acta Biotheoretica =

- Discipline: Theoretical biology
- Language: English
- Edited by: F.J.A. Jacobs

Publication details
- History: 1935–present
- Publisher: Springer Science+Business Media
- Frequency: Quarterly
- Impact factor: 1.185 (2021)

Standard abbreviations
- ISO 4: Acta Biotheor.

Indexing
- CODEN: ABIOAN
- ISSN: 0001-5342 (print); 1572-8358 (web)
- LCCN: 38011617
- OCLC no.: 41558734

Links
- Journal homepage; Online access

Acta Biotheoretica: Mathematical and philosophical foundations of biological and biomedical science is a quarterly peer-reviewed scientific journal published by Springer Science+Business Media. It is the official journal of the Jan van der Hoeven Society for Theoretical Biology. The editor-in-chief is F.J.A. Jacobs (Leiden University).

== Aims and scope ==
The journal's focus is theoretical biology which includes mathematical representation, treatment, and modeling for simulations and quantitative descriptions. The journal's focus also includes the philosophy of biology which emphasizes looking at the methods developed to form biological theory. Topical coverage also includes biomathematics, computational biology, genetics, ecology, and morphology.

== Abstracting and indexing ==
This journal is abstracted and indexed in:

- Biological Abstracts
- BIOSIS Previews
- Science Citation Index
- The Zoological Record
- Current Contents/Agriculture, Biology & Environmental Sciences
- Elsevier BIOBASE
- EMBASE
- EMBiology
- GEOBASE
- Chemical Abstracts Service
- CAB Abstracts
- Global Health
- Academic OneFile
- Astrophysics Data System
- Current Index to Statistics
- International Bibliographic Information on Dietary Supplements
- INIS - Atomindex
- MEDLINE
- Scopus
- The Philosopher's Index

According to the Journal Citation Reports, the journal has a 2021 impact factor of 1.185. According to the SCImago Journal Rank (SJR), the journal h-index is 35.
