= Jakob Benjamin Fischer =

Baltic German naturalist

Jakob Benjamin Fischer (13 October 1731 – 25 July 1793) was a Baltic German naturalist and apothecary.

== Life and work ==
Jakob Benjamin Fischer was born in Riga and studied to become an apothecary there. Between 1756 and 1758, he studied natural sciences, physics and chemistry in Copenhagen and in 1761 he went to Uppsala and studied botany and zoology under Carl von Linné. He then moved back to Riga and run a pharmacy in the city. He also engaged in studies of the natural environment of present-day Latvia, and produced several works on the nature of Latvia in which he also referred to the native Latvian names of plants and animals. The most important of his works, Versuch einer Naturgeschichte von Liefland, is one of the earliest descriptions of the nature of Livonia.
