= John Carey (botanist) =

British botanist (1797–1880)

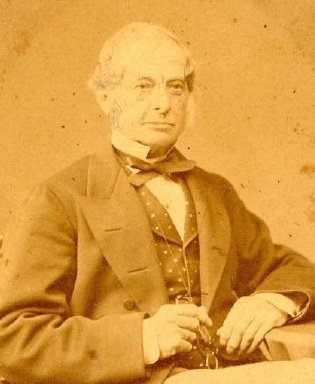
- Carey in 1873
- Born: 1797; London, England
- Died: 26 March 1880; Blackheath, London, England
- Scientific career
- Fields: Botany
- Author abbrev. (botany): J.Carey

John Carey (1797 – 26 March 1880) was a British botanist who studied in North America between 1830 and 1852. Carey was a "frequent guest and invaluable companion" to Asa Gray. Carey revised Gray's proofs of the first edition of the Manual of the Botany of the Northern United States, also contributing articles on Salix (willows), Populus (poplars), and Carex (sedges). It is said his "splendid herbarium" was destroyed in the Great New York City Fire of 1845. In his obituary, Gray described Carey as "a near and faithful friend, an accomplished botanist, a genial and warm-hearted and truly good man."

John Carey described several species, primarily in the genus Carex, including Carex grayi. Several species are named in his honour, including Carex careyana and Persicaria careyi.
