= List of botanists by author abbreviation (T–V) =

This is an incomplete list of botanists by their author abbreviation, which is designed for citation with the botanical names or works that they have published. This list follows that established by Brummitt & Powell (1992). Use of that list is recommended by Rec. 46A Note 1 of the International Code of Nomenclature for algae, fungi, and plants. The list is kept up to date online at The International Plant Names Index and Index Fungorum.

In some cases an "author abbreviation" consists of a full surname, while in other cases the surname is abbreviated and/or accompanied by one or more initials. There is no space between the initials and the surname (or its abbreviation).

==== Order of entries ====
The list here is maintained strictly in order of the alphabetic characters in the abbreviation; thus "A.B.Jacks." appears under "A" not "J", and is located as if the characters were "ABJACKS". Capitalization is ignored as are all non-alphabetic characters such as "." and space. Diacritical marks are also ignored, so that, e.g., "ü" is treated as if it were "u".

==== Navigation ====
Because of its length, the list is split across separate pages. All alphabetic sections can be accessed from the short table of contents; the vertical bars show the page divisions. Searching will only find an entry within a page.

== A–S ==
Contents:	A	B	C	D	E F	G	H	I J	K L	M	N O	P	Q R	S	T U V	W X Y Z

To find entries for A–S, use the table of contents above.

== T ==
Contents: Top	A	B	C	D	E F	G	H	I J	K L	M	N O	P	Q R	S	T U V	W X Y Z

- T.A.Chr. – Tyge Ahrengot Christensen (1918–1996)
- Täckh. – Vivi Täckholm (1898–1978)
- Tagawa – Motozi Tagawa (1908–1977)
- Tagg – Harry Frank Tagg (1874–1933)
- T.A.James – Teresa Ann James (1956-2019)
- Takeda – Hisayoshi Takeda (1883–1972)
- Takeuchi – H.Takeuchi (fl. 1929)
- Takht. – Armen Takhtajan (1910–2009)
- Tali – Kadri Tali (born 1966)
- Taliev – Valerij Ivanovich Taliev (1872–1932)
- Tamamsch. – Sophia G. Tamamschjan (1901–1981)
- T.Amano – Tetsuo Amano (1912–1985)
- Tamayo – Francisco Tamayo (1902–1985)
- Tame – T.M. Tame (fl. 1996)
- Tamiya – Hiroshi Tamiya (1903–1984)
- Tammes – Tine (Jantine) Tammes (1871–1947)
- Tamura – Michio Tamura (1927–2007)
- Tanaka – Chōzaburō Tanaka (1885–1976)
- Tandang – Danilo N. Tandang (fl. 2005)
- T.Anderson – Thomas Anderson (1832–1870)
- Tang – Tsin Tang (1897–1984)
- Tangav. – A. C. Tangavelou (fl. 2003)
- Tansley – Arthur Tansley (1871–1955)
- Tao Chen – Tao Chen (born 1963)
- Tardieu – Marie Laure Tardieu (1902–1998)
- Tärnström – Christopher Tärnström (1703–1746)
- Tartenova – M. A. Tartenova (fl. 1957)
- T.A.Stephenson – Thomas Alan Stephenson (1898–1961)
- Tat. – Alexander Alexejevitch Tatarinow (1817–1886)
- Tate – Ralph Tate (1840–1901)
- Tateoka – Tsuguo Tateoka (1931–1994)
- Tatew. – Misao Tatewaki (1899–1976)
- Taton – Auguste Taton (1914–1989)
- Taub. – Paul Hermann Wilhelm Taubert (1862–1897)
- Tausch – Ignaz Friedrich Tausch (1793–1848)
- Tauss – Catherine Tauss (fl. 2011)
- Tawan – Cheksum Supiah Tawan (born 1959)
- T.A.Williams – Thomas Albert Williams (1865–1900)
- Taylor – Thomas Taylor (1786–1848)
- T.Baskerv. – Thomas Baskerville (1812–1840)
- T.Bastard – Thomas Bastard (died 1815)
- T.Baytop. – Turhan Baytop (1920–2002)
- T.B.Lee – Tchang Bok Lee (1919–2003)
- T.B.Moore – Thomas Bather Moore (1850–1919)
- T.Cao – Tong Cao (born 1946)
- T.C.Chen – Tê Chao Chen (born 1926)
- T.C.E.Fr. – Thore Christian Elias Fries (1886–1930)
- T.Chen – T. Chen (fl. 1985)
- T.C.Hsu – Tian Chuan Hsu (fl. 2006)
- T.C.Huang – Tseng Chieng Huang (born 1931)
- T.Cooke – Theodore Cooke (1836–1910)
- T.C.Palmer – Thomas Chalkley Palmer (1860–1934)
- T.C.Pan – Ti Chang Pan (born 1937)
- T.C.Scheff. – Theodore Comstock Scheffer (1904–2003)
- T.C.Wilson – Trevor C. Wilson (fl. 2012)
- T.D.Jacobsen – Terry Dale Jacobsen (born 1950)
- T.D.Macfarl. – Terry Desmond Macfarlane (born 1953)
- T.D.Penn. – Terence Dale Pennington (born 1938)
- T.Duncan – Thomas Duncan (born 1948)
- T.Durand – Théophile Alexis Durand (1855–1912)
- T.E.Díaz – Tomás Emilio Díaz (born 1949)
- T.E.Hunt – Trevor Edgar Hunt (1913–1970)
- Teijsm. – Johannes Elias Teijsmann (1808–1882)
- Temb. – Yakov Gustavovich Temberg (born 1914)
- Temminck – Coenraad Jacob Temminck (1778–1858)
- Temp. – Joannes Albert Tempère (1847–1926)
- Templeton – John Templeton (1766–1825)
- Temu – Ruwa-Aichi Pius Cosmos Temu (born 1955)
- Ten. – Michele Tenore (1780–1861)
- Ten.-Woods – Julian Edmund Tenison-Woods (1832–1889)
- Teo – Stephen P. Teo (fl. 1997)
- Teodor. – Emanoil Constantin Teodoresco (1866–1949)
- Tepper – Johann Gottlieb Otto Tepper (1841–1923)
- Teppner — Herwig Teppner (born 1941)
- T.E.Raven – Tamra Engelhorn Raven (born 1945)
- T.F.Andrews – Theodore Francis Andrews (born 1917)
- T.F.Daniel – Thomas Franklin Daniel (born 1954)
- T.F.Forst. – Thomas Furley Forster (1761–1825)
- T.G.Gao – Tian Gang Gao
- T.G.Hartley – Thomas Gordon Hartley (1931–2016)
- T.G.J.Rayner – Timothy Guy Johnson Rayner (born 1963)
- T.G.Pearson – Thomas Gilbert Pearson (1873–1943)
- T.Green – Ted Green (1921–2022)
- T.G.White – Theodore Greely White (1872–1901)
- T.Hall. – Tony Hall (fl. 2011)
- T.Hammer – Timothy Andrew Hammer (born 1984)
- T.Hanb. – Thomas Hanbury (1832–1907)
- Tharp – Benjamin Carroll Tharp (1885–1964)
- T.H.Chung – Tai Hyun Chung (1882–1971)
- Theilade – Ida Theilade (fl. 1995)
- Thell. – Albert Thellung (1881–1928)
- Theophr. – Theophrastus (Tyrtamus) (c. 371 – c. 287 BC)
- Thér. – Irénée Thériot (1859–1947)
- Therese – Princess Theresa of Bavaria (1850–1925)
- Th.Fr. – Theodor Magnus Fries (1832–1913)
- Thiede – Joachim Thiede (born 1963)
- Thiele – Friedrich Leopold Thiele (died 1841)
- Thielens – Armand Thielens (1833–1874)
- Thieret – John William Thieret (1926–2005)
- Thijsse – Jacobus Pieter Thijsse (1863–1945)
- Thines – Marco Thines (born 1978)
- T.H.Nguyên – Tiên Hiêp Nguyên (born 1947)
- Thomé – Otto Wilhelm Thomé (1840–1925)
- Thomson – Thomas Thomson (1817–1878)
- T.Hong – Tao Hong (fl. 1963)
- Thonn. – Peter Thonning (1775–1848)
- Thonner – Franz Thonner (1863–1928)
- Thorel – Clovis Thorel (1833–1911)
- Thorne – Robert Folger Thorne (1920–2015)
- Thoroddsen – Þorvaldur (Thorvaldur) Thoroddsen (1855–1921)
- Thorsen – Mike Thorsen (fl. 2009)
- Thory – Claude Antoine Thory (1759–1827)
- Thoth. – Krishnamurthy Thothathri (born 1929)
- Thouars – Louis-Marie Aubert du Petit-Thouars (1758–1831)
- Thouin – André Thouin (1747–1824)
- Threlfall – S. Threlfall (fl. 1983)
- Threlkeld – Caleb Threlkeld (1676–1728)
- Thuill. – Jean Louis Thuillier (1757–1822)
- Thulin – Mats Thulin (born 1948)
- Thüm. – Felix von Thümen (1839–1892)
- Thunb. – Carl Peter Thunberg (1743–1828)
- Thur. – Gustave Adolphe Thuret (1817–1875)
- Thurb. – George Thurber (1821–1890)
- Thurm. – Jules Thurmann (1804–1855)
- Thurn – Everard Ferdinand im Thurn (1852–1932)
- Thwaites – George Henry Kendrick Thwaites (1811–1882)
- Th.Wolf – Theodor Wolf (1841–1924)
- Tich – Nguyen Thien Tich (fl. 2010)
- Tidestr. – Ivar Tidestrom (1864–1956)
- Tiegh. – Philippe Édouard Léon van Tieghem (1839–1914)
- Tilesius – Wilhelm Gottlieb Tilesius von Tilenau (1769–1857)
- Tiling – Heinrich Sylvester Theodor Tiling (1818–1871)
- Timb.-Lagr. – Édouard Timbal-Lagrave (1819–1888)
- Timeroy – Marc Antoine Timeroy (1793–1856)
- Timler – Friedrich Karl Timler (1914–1995)
- Tindale – Mary Douglas Tindale (1920–2011)
- Tineo – Vincenzo Tineo (1791–1856)
- Titius – Johann Daniel Titius (Tietz) (1729–1796)
- T.Itô – Tokutarô Itô (1868–1941)
- Tjaden – William Louis Tjaden (born 1913)
- T.J.Ayers – Tina J. Ayers (born 1957)
- T.J.Chester – Thomas Jay Chester (born 1951)
- T.Jensen – Thomas Jensen (1824–1877)
- T.J.Motley – Timothy J. Motley (1966–2013)
- T.J.Sørensen – Thorvald (Thorwald) Julius Sørensen (1902–1973)
- T.J.Wallace – Thomas Jennings Wallace (born 1912)
- T.J.Zhang – Tie Jun Zhang (born 1962)
- T.Knight – Thomas Andrew Knight (1759–1838)
- T.Kop. – Timo Juhani Koponen (born 1939)
- T.Lebel – Teresa Lebel (fl. 2000)
- T.Lestib. – Thémistocle Gaspard Lestiboudois (1797–1876)
- T.L.Ming – Tien Lu Ming (born 1937)
- T.Lobb – Thomas Lobb (1820–1894)
- T.MacDoug. – Thomas Baillie MacDougall (1895–1973)
- T.Marsson – Theodor Friedrich Marsson (1816–1892)
- T.M.Barkley – Theodore Mitchell Barkley (1934–2004)
- T.M.Harris – Thomas Maxwell Harris (1903–1983)
- T.Mitch. – Thomas Livingstone Mitchell (1792-1855)
- T.Miyake – Tsutomu Miyake (born 1880)
- T.Moore – Thomas Moore (1821–1887)
- T.M.Reeve – Thomas M. Reeve (fl. 1989)
- T.M.Salter – Terence Macleane Salter (1883–1969)
- T.M.Schust. – Tanja M. Schuster (fl. 2011)
- T.M.Williams – Tanisha M. Williams (fl. 2022)
- T.Nees – Theodor Friedrich Ludwig Nees von Esenbeck (1787–1837)
- T.N.McCoy – Thomas Nevil McCoy (1905–1976)
- T.N.Nguyen – Thi Nhan Nguyen (born 1953)
- Tod. – Agostino Todaro (1818–1892)
- Todzia – Carol Ann Todzia (fl. 1986)
- Toelken – Hellmut Richard Toelken (born 1939)
- Toledo – Joaquim Franco de Toledo (1905–1952)
- Tolm. – Alexandr Innokentevich Tolmatchew (1903–1979)
- Tomas. – Ruggero Tomaselli (1920–1982)
- Tomb – Andrew Spencer Tomb (born 1943)
- Tomka – Pavol Tomka (fl. 2024)
- Tomm. – Muzio Giuseppe Spirito de Tommasini (1794–1879)
- Torén – Olof Torén (1718–1753)
- Torr. – John Torrey (1796–1873)
- Torre – Antonio Rocha da Torre (1904–1995)
- Torres – Maria Amelia Torres (1934–2011)
- Torrend – Camille Torrend (1875–1961)
- T.Osborn – Theodore George Bentley Osborn (1887–1973)
- Toscano – Antonio Luiz Vieira Toscano (born 1957)
- Totten – Henry Roland Totten (1892–1974)
- Tourlet – Ernest Henry Tourlet (1843–1907)
- Tourn. – Joseph Pitton de Tournefort (1656–1708)
- Touton – Karl Touton (1858–1934)
- Tovey – James Richard Tovey (1873–1922)
- Towle – Brian J. Towle (fl. 2022)
- Towner – Howard Frost Towner (born 1943)
- T.P.Boyle – T. P. Boyle (fl. 2002)
- T.P.Lin – Tsan Piao Lin (born 1948)
- T.Post – Tom (Tomas) Erik von Post (1858–1912)
- T.P.Yi – Tong Pei Yi (fl. 1980)
- T.Q.Nguyen – To Quyen Nguyen (fl. 1965)
- Trab. – Louis Charles Trabut (1853–1929)
- Tracey – John Geoffrey Tracey (1930–2004)
- Tracy – Samuel Mills Tracy (1847–1920)
- Trad. – John Tradescant the younger (1608–1662)
- Trail – James William Helenus Trail (1851–1919)
- Transeau – Edgar Nelson Transeau (1875–1960)
- Tratman – Frank Tratman (1860–1926)
- Tratt. – Leopold Trattinnick (1764–1889)
- Traub – Hamilton Paul Traub (1890–1983)
- Trautv. – Ernst Rudolf von Trautvetter (1809–1889)
- T.R.Dudley – Theodore Robert Dudley (1936–1994)
- Treat – Mary Lua Adelia Davis Treat (1830–1923)
- Trécul – Auguste Trécul (1818–1896)
- T.Reeves – Timothy Reeves (born 1947)
- Trel. – William Trelease (1857–1945)
- Treub – Melchior Treub (1851–1910)
- Trevelyan – Walter Calverley Trevelyan (1797–1879)
- Trevir. – Ludolf Christian Treviranus (1779–1864)
- Trevis. – Vittore Benedetto Antonio Trevisan de Saint-Léon (1818–1897)
- Trew – Christoph Jakob Trew (1695–1769)
- Triana – José Jerónimo Triana (1834–1890)
- Tricker – Charles William Bret Tricker (1852–1916)
- Trimen – Henry Trimen (1843–1896)
- Trin. – Carl Bernhard von Trinius (1778–1844)
- Tripp – Frances E. Tripp (1832–1890)
- Tristram – Henry Baker Tristram (1822–1906)
- Troll – Wilhelm Troll (1897–1978)
- Trofimov – Dimitrij Trofimov (fl. 2016)
- Trotter – Alessandro Trotter (1874–1967)
- Troupin – Georges M.D.J. Troupin (born 1923)
- Trovó – Marcelo Trovó (fl. 2009)
- Trow – Albert Howard Trow (1863–1939)
- Trudell – Harry W. Trudell (1879–1964)
- Trudgen – Malcolm Eric Trudgen (born 1951)
- True – Rodney Howard True (1866–1940)
- Trumbull – James Hammond Trumbull (1821–1897)
- Tscherm.-Seys. – Erich von Tschermak-Seysenegg (1871–1962)
- Tscherm.-Woess – Elisabeth Tschermak-Woess (1917–2001)
- Tsering – Jambey Tsering (fl. 2020)
- Tsiang – Ying Tsiang (1898–1982)
- T.S.Liu – Tang Shui Liu (1911–1997)
- T.S.Nayar – T.S. Nayar (fl. 1998)
- T.S.Palmer – Theodore Sherman Palmer (1860–1962)
- T.S.Patrick – Thomas Stewart Patrick (1944–2019)
- T.Spratt – Thomas Abel Brimage Spratt (1811–1888)
- T.Stephenson – Thomas Stephenson (1865–1948)
- Tsukaya – Hirokazu Tsukaya (born 1964)
- Tswett – Mikhail Tsvet (1872–1919)
- T.S.Ying – Tsun Shen Ying (born 1933)
- T.Taylor – Thomas Taylor (1820–1910)
- T.T.Chang – Tun Tschu Chang (1927–2006)
- T.T.McIntosh – Terry T. McIntosh (born 1948)
- T.T.Yu – Tse Tsun Yu (1908–1986)
- Tubergen – Cornelis Gerrit van Tubergen (1844–1919)
- Tuck. – Edward Tuckerman (1817–1886)
- Tuckey – James Hingston Tuckey (1776–1816)
- Tul. – Louis René Tulasne (1815–1885)
- Tullb. – Sven Axel Teodor Tullberg (1852–1886)
- Tunmann – Otto Tunmann (1867–1919)
- Tur – Nuncia María Tur (born 1940)
- Turcz. – Nicolai Stepanovitch Turczaninow (1796–1863)
- Turland – Nicholas J. Turland (born 1966)
- Turner – Dawson Turner (1775–1858)
- Turpin – Pierre Jean François Turpin (1775–1840)
- Turra – Antonio Turra (1730–1796)
- Turrill – William Bertram Turrill (1890–1961)
- Tussac – François Richard de Tussac (1751–1837)
- Tutin – Thomas Gaskell Tutin (1908–1987)
- Tuyama – Takasi Tuyama (1910–2000)
- T.V.Egorova – Tatiana Vladimirovna Egorova (1930–2007)
- T.West – Tuffen West (1823–1891)
- Twining – Elizabeth Twining (1805–1889)
- T.W.Nelson – Thomas W. Nelson (1928–2006)
- T.Yamaz. – Takasi Yamazaki (1921–2007)
- T.Yukawa – Tomohisa Yukawa (fl. 1992)
- Tzanoud. – Dimitris Tzanoudakis (born 1950)
- T.Z.Hsu – Ting Zhi Hsu (born 1941)
- Tzvelev – Nikolai Nikolaievich Tzvelev (1925–2015)

== U ==
Contents: Top	A	B	C	D	E F	G	H	I J	K L	M	N O	P	Q R	S	T U V	W X Y Z

- U.C.La – Ung Chil La (fl. 1966)
- Ucria – Bernardino da Ucria (1739–1796)
- Udachin – R. A. Udachin (fl. 1970)
- Udar – Ram Udar (1926–1985)
- Udovicic – Frank Udovicic (born 1966)
- Ueki – Robert Ueki (fl. 1973)
- U.Hamann – Ulrich Hamann (born 1931)
- Ulbr. – Oskar Eberhard Ulbrich (1879–1952)
- Ule – Ernst Heinrich Georg Ule (1854–1915)
- Uline – Edwin Burton Uline (1867–1933)
- Ulmer – Torsten Ulmer (born 1970)
- Umber – Ray E. Umber (1948–2018)
- U.Müll.-Doblies – Ute Müller-Doblies (born 1938)
- Underw. – Lucien Marcus Underwood (1853–1907)
- Unger – Franz Joseph Andreas Nicolaus Unger (1800–1870)
- Unwin – William Charles Unwin (1811–1887)
- Upham – Warren Upham (1850–1934)
- U.P.Pratov – Uktam Pratovich Pratov (1934–2018)
- Upton – Walter Thomas Upton (1922–2012)
- Urb. – Ignatz Urban (1848–1931)
- Urbatsch – Lowell Edward Urbatsch (born 1942)
- Ursch – Eugène Ursch (1882–1962)
- Urtubey – Estrella Urtubey (fl. 1999)
- Urum. – Ivan Kroff Urumoff (1857–1937)
- U.Schneid. – Ulrike Schneider (born 1936)
- Usteri – Paul Usteri (1768–1831)
- Utsch – Jacob Utsch (1824–1901)
- Utteridge – Timothy Michael Arthur Utteridge (born 1970)

== V ==
Contents: Top	A	B	C	D	E F	G	H	I J	K L	M	N O	P	Q R	S	T U V	W X Y Z

- V.A.Albert – Victor Anthony Albert (born 1964)
- Vacc. – Lino Vaccari (1873–1951)
- Vachell – Eleanor Vachell (1879–1948)
- V.A.Funk – Vicki Ann Funk (1947–2019)
- Vaga – August Vaga (1893–1960)
- Vahl – Martin Vahl (1749–1804)
- Vail – Anna Murray Vail (1863–1955)
- Vaill. – Sébastien Vaillant (1669–1722)
- Vain. – Edvard (Edward) August Vainio (1853–1929)
- Val. – see Valeton
- Valck.Sur. – Jan Valckenier Suringar (1864–1932)
- Valentine – David Henriques Valentine (1912–1987)
- Valeton – Theodoric Valeton (1855–1929)
- Vallentin – Elinor Frances Vallentin (1873–1924)
- Vallès-Xirau – Joan Vallès-Xirau (born 1959)
- Valls – José Francisco Montenegro Valls (born 1945)
- V.A.Matthews – Victoria Ann Matthews (born 1941)
- Váňa – Jiří Váňa (1940–2018)
- Van Bamb. – Charles Eugène Marie Van Bambeke (1829–1918)
- Vand. – Domenico Agostino Vandelli (1735–1816)
- Vandas – Karel Vandas (1861–1923)
- Van der Byl – Paul Andries van der Bijl (1888–1939)
- van der Werff – Henk van der Werff (born 1946)
- Van Heurck – Henri Ferdinand Van Heurck (1838–1909)
- Vanhöffen – Ernst Vanhöffen (1858–1918)
- Van Houtte – Louis Benoit Van Houtte (1810–1876)
- Vanij. – Ongkarn Vanijajiva (born 1977)
- V.A.Nikitin – Vladimir Alekseevich Nikitin (1906–1974)
- Vaniot – Eugene Vaniot (1845–1913)
- van Jaarsv. – Ernst Jacobus van Jaarsveld (born 1953)
- Van Scheepen – Johan Van Scheepen (fl. 1997)
- Varapr. – K.S. Varaprasad (fl. 2009)
- Vasey – George Vasey (1822–1893)
- Vassilcz. – Ivan Tikhonovich Vassilczenko (1903–1995)
- Vasudeva – R.S. Vasudeva (fl. 1953)
- Vatke – Wilhelm Vatke (1849–1889)
- Vattimo – Ítalo de Vattimo (born 1930)
- Vaughan – John Vaughan (1855–1922)
- Vaupel – Friedrich Karl Johann Vaupel (1876–1927)
- Vauvel – Léopold Eugène Vauvel (1848–1915)
- Vavilov – Nikolai Vavilov (1887–1943)
- v.A.v.R. – Cornelis Rugier Willem Karel van Alderwerelt van Rosenburgh (1863–1936) (This has been replaced by the abbreviation Alderw. but still appears in older texts)
- V.A.W.Graham – Victoria Anne Wassell Graham (born 1950) (birth name Victoria Anne Wassell Smith)
- V.A.W.Sm. – Victoria Anne Wassell Smith (born 1950) (married name Victoria Anne Wassell Graham)
- V.B.Heinrich – Volker B. Heinrich (fl. 2009)
- V.Chandras. – Veerichetty Chandrasekaran (born 1941)
- V.Cordus – Valerius Cordus (1515–1544)
- V.C.Souza – Vinicius Castro Souza (born 1954)
- V.D.Matthews – Velma Dare Matthews (1904–1958)
- V.E.Avet. – Vandika Ervandovna Avetisyan (born 1928)
- V.E.Grant – Verne Edwin Grant (1917–2007)
- Veillon – Jean-Marie Veillon (fl. 1982)
- Veitch – John Gould Veitch (1839–1870)
- Veldkamp – Jan Frederik Veldkamp (1941–2017)
- Velen. – Josef Velenovský (1858–1949)
- Vell. – José Mariano da Conceição Vellozo (1742–1811)
- Velley – Thomas Velley (1749–1806)
- Velloso – Joaquim Velloso de Miranda (1733–1815)
- Vent. – Étienne Pierre Ventenat (1757–1808)
- Vente – M. Vente (fl. 1982)
- Verdc. – Bernard Verdcourt (1925–2011)
- Verloove – Filip Verloove (fl. 2004)
- Verschaff. – Ambroise Colette Alexandre Verschaffelt (1825–1886)
- Vesque – Julien Joseph Vesque (1848–1895)
- Vest – Lorenz Chrysanth von Vest (1776–1840)
- Vězda – Antonín Vězda (1920–2008)
- V.Gibbs – Vicary Gibbs (1853–1932)
- V.Higgins – Vera Higgins (1892–1968)
- Vickery – Joyce Winifred Vickery (1908–1979)
- Vict. – Conrad Kirouac, Brother Marie-Victorin (1885–1944)
- Vida – Gábor Vida (born 1935)
- Vidal – António José Vidal (1808–1879)
- Vidal-Russ. – Romina Vidal-Russell (fl. 2010)
- Vieill. – Eugène Vieillard (1819–1896)
- Viera y Clavijo – José de Viera y Clavijo (1731–1813)
- Vierh. – Friedrich Karl Max Vierhapper (1876–1932)
- Vietz – Ferdinand Bernhard Vietz (1772–1815)
- Vig. – Louis Guillaume Alexandre Viguier (1790–1867)
- Vigo – Josep Vigo i Bonada (born 1937)
- Vignolo – Ferdinando Vignolo-Lutati (1878–1965)
- Vilh. – Jan Vilhelm (1876–1931)
- Vill. – Dominique Villars (1745–1814)
- Villada – Manuel Maria Villada (1841–1924)
- Villar – Emile Huguet del Villar (1871–1951)
- Villarreal – José Angel Villarreal (born 1956)
- Villarroel – Daniel Villarroel (born 1981)
- Villar-Seoane – Liliana Mónica Villar de Seoane (born 1953)
- Villaseñor – José Luis Villaseñor (born 1954)
- Vilm. – Pierre Louis François Lévêque de Vilmorin (1816–1860)
- Vink – Willem Vink (born 1931)
- Virot – Robert Virot (1915–2002)
- Vis. – Roberto de Visiani (1800–1878)
- Vitman – Fulgenzio Vitman (1728–1806)
- V.T.Pham – Van The Pham (born 1981)
- Vitt – Dale Hadley Vitt (born 1944)
- Vittad. – Carlo Vittadini (1800–1865)
- Viv. – Domenico Viviani (1772–1840)
- Viv.-Morel – Joseph Victor Viviand-Morel (1843–1915)
- V.J.Chapm. – Valentine Jackson Chapman (1910–1980)
- V.Kučera – Viktor Kučera (fl. 2005)
- V.Kunca – Vladimír Kunca (fl. 2015)
- Vlădescu – Mihai Vlădescu (1865–1944)
- Vl.V.Nikitin – Vladimir Vladimirovich Nikitin (1962–2007)
- V.M.Badillo – Victor Manuel Badillo (1920–2008)
- V.M.Bates – Vernon M. Bates (fl. 1984)
- Vöcht. – Hermann Vöchting (1847–1917)
- Voeltzk. – Alfred Voeltzkow (1860–1947)
- Vogel – Julius Rudolph Theodor Vogel (1812–1841)
- Vogt – Robert M. Vogt (born 1957)
- Voigt – Joachim Otto Voigt (1798–1843)
- Volkart – Albert Volkart (1873–1951)
- Volkens – Georg Ludwig August Volkens (1855–1917)
- Vollesen – Kaj Børge Vollesen (born 1946)
- Voronts. – Maria Sergeevna Vorontsova (born 1979)
- Voss – Andreas Voss (1857–1924)
- V.P.Castro – Vitorino Paiva Castro (born 1942)
- V.P.Prasad – Vadhyaruparambil Prabhakaran Prasad (born 1960)
- V.Prakash – Ved Prakash (1957–2000)
- Vrugtman – Freek Vrugtman (1927–2022)
- V.Singh – Vijendra Singh (born 1947)
- V.S.White – Violetta Susan Elizabeth White (1875–1949)
- V.Ten. – Vincenzo Tenore (1825–1886)
- Vugt – Rogier van Vugt (fl. 2009)
- Vuk. – Ljudevit Farkaš Vukotinović (1813–1893)
- Vural – Mecit Vural (fl. 1983)
- Vved. – Alexei Ivanovich Vvedensky (1898–1972)
- V.V.Byalt – Vyacheslav Vyacheslavovich Byalt (born 1966)
- V.V.Nikitin – Vasilii Vasilevich Nikitin (1906–1988)
- V.W.Steinm. – Victor W. Steinmann (fl. 1995)

== W–Z ==
Contents: Top	A	B	C	D	E F	G	H	I J	K L	M	N O	P	Q R	S	T U V	W X Y Z

To find entries for W–Z, use the table of contents above.

== See also ==
- List of South African plant botanical authors
- List of botanists
- Category:Botanists
- List of Russian botanists
- List of zoologists by author abbreviation
