= List of botanists by author abbreviation (D) =

This is an incomplete list of botanists by their author abbreviation, which is designed for citation with the botanical names or works that they have published. This list follows that established by Brummitt & Powell (1992). Use of that list is recommended by Rec. 46A Note 1 of the International Code of Nomenclature for algae, fungi, and plants. The list is kept up to date online at The International Plant Names Index and Index Fungorum.

In some cases an "author abbreviation" consists of a full surname, while in other cases the surname is abbreviated and/or accompanied by one or more initials. There is no space between the initials and the surname (or its abbreviation).

==== Order of entries ====
The list here is maintained strictly in order of the alphabetic characters in the abbreviation; thus "A.B.Jacks." appears under "A" not "J", and is located as if the characters were "ABJACKS". Capitalization is ignored as are all non-alphabetic characters such as "." and space. Diacritical marks are also ignored, so that, e.g., "ü" is treated as if it were "u".

==== Navigation ====
Because of its length, the list is split across separate pages. All alphabetic sections can be accessed from the short table of contents; the vertical bars show the page divisions. Searching will only find an entry within a page.

== A–C ==
Contents:	A	B	C	D	E F	G	H	I J	K L	M	N O	P	Q R	S	T U V	W X Y Z

To find entries for A–C, use the table of contents above.

== D ==
Contents: Top	A	B	C	D	E F	G	H	I J	K L	M	N O	P	Q R	S	T U V	W X Y Z

- D.A.Cooke – David Alan Cooke (born 1949)
- D.A.German – Dmitry A. German (fl. 2001)
- D.A.Herb. – Desmond Andrew Herbert (1898–1976)
- Dahl – Anders Dahl (1751–1789)
- Dahlgren – Bror Eric Dahlgren (1877–1961)
- Dahlst. – Gustav Adolf Hugo Dahlstedt (1856–1934)
- D.A.Keith – David A. Keith (fl. 2001)
- D.Al-Bader – Dhia Al-Baderh (fl. 2022)
- Daléchamps – Jacques Daléchamps (also as Jacobus Dale Champius) (1513–1588)
- Dallim. – William Dallimore (1871–1959)
- Dalpé – Yolande Dalpé (born 1948)
- Dalström – Stig Dalström (fl. 1983)
- Daly – Douglas C. Daly (born 1953)
- Dalzell – Nicol Alexander Dalzell (1817–1877)
- Dalziel – John McEwan Dalziel (1872–1948)
- D'Amato – Giovanni Frederico D'Amato (born 1941) (also Federico)
- Da M.Li – Da Ming Li (fl. 2007)
- Dammer – Carl Lebrecht Udo Dammer (1860–1920)
- D.A.Morrison – David A. Morrison (born 1958)
- Damth. – Anissara Damthongdee (fl. 2018)
- Dana – James Dwight Dana (1813–1895)
- Dandy – James Edgar Dandy (1903–1976)
- Danert – Siegfried Danert (1926–1973)
- Danesi – L. Danesi (1851–1915)
- Danet – Frédéric Danet (born 1968)
- Danguy – Paul Auguste Danguy (1862–1942)
- Daniell – William Freeman Daniell (1818–1865)
- Daniels – Francis Potter Daniels (1869–1947)
- Danielsen – Anders Danielsen (1919–2006)
- Danihelka – Jiří Danihelka (born 1968)
- Däniker – Albert Ulrich Däniker (1894–1957)
- Danin – Avinoam Danin (born 1939)
- Dans. – Pierre Mackay Dansereau (1911–2011)
- Danser – Benedictus Hubertus Danser (1891–1943)
- Danthoine – D. (Étienne) Danthoine (1739–1794)
- Danzé-Corsin – Paule Danzé-Corsin (fl. 1956)
- Darby – John M. Darby (1804–1877)
- Darbysh. – S.J. Darbyshire (born 1953)
- Darl. – William Darlington (1782–1863)
- Darling – Samuel Taylor Darling (1872–1925)
- Darnaedi – Deddy Darnaedi (born 1952)
- D.Arora – David Arora (born 1957)
- Darwin – Charles Darwin (1809–1882)
- Das – Atulananda Das (1879–1952)
- D.A.Simpson – David Alan Simpson (born 1955)
- D.A.Sm. – Doris Alma Smith (1912–1999)
- D.A.Sutton – David A. Sutton (born 1952)
- Daubs – Edwin Horace Daubs (fl. 1965)
- Dauncey – Elizabeth Anne Dauncey (born 1965)
- Daveau – Jules Alexandre Daveau (1852–1929)
- Davenp. – George Edward Davenport (1833–1907)
- Davey – Frederick Hamilton Davey (1868–1915)
- David – Armand David (1826–1900)
- Davidse – Gerrit Davidse (born 1942)
- Davidson – Anstruther Davidson (1860–1932)
- Davies – Hugh Davies (1739–1821)
- Davis – John Jefferson Davis (1852–1937)
- D.A.Webb – David Allardice Webb (1912–1994)
- Dawson – John William Dawson (1820–1899)
- Day – Alva George Day (1920–2014)
- D.Beards. – David Beardsell (fl. 1992)
- D.B.Horne – David Bertram Horne (born 1940)
- D.Brândză – Dimitrie Brândză (1846–1895)
- D.B.Ward – Daniel Bertram Ward (1928–2016)
- DC. – Augustin Pyramus de Candolle (1778–1841)
- D.C.Eaton – Daniel Cady Eaton (1834–1895)
- D.C.Linds. – Denis Christopher Lindsay (fl. 1971)
- D.C.McClint. – David Charles McClintock (1913–2001)
- D.Cooper – Dorothy Cooper (born 1941)
- D.C.Stuart – D.C. Stuart (born 1940)
- D.Das – Debika Das (born 1938)
- D.D.Awasthi – Dharani Dhar Awasthi (1922–2011)
- D.D.Baldwin – David Dwight Baldwin (1831–1912)
- D.D.Cunn. – David Douglas Cunningham (1843–1914)
- D.Dean Cunn. – Darrell Dean Cunningham (born 1951)
- D.Dietr. – David Nathaniel Dietrich (1799–1888)
- D.D.Keck – David D. Keck (1903–1995)
- D.Don – David Don (1799–1841)
- D.Donati – Davide Donati (born 1975)
- D.D.Perkins – David Dexter Perkins (1919–2007)
- D.Drake – Daniel Drake (1785–1852)
- D.D.Spauld. – Daniel D. Spaulding (fl. 2016)
- D.D.Tao – De Ding Tao (born 1937)
- Deam – Charles Clemon Deam (1865–1953)
- de Bary – Anton de Bary (1831–1888)
- Debeaux – Jean Odon Debeaux (1826–1910)
- D.E.Beetle – Dorothy Erna Beetle (née Schoof, later Beetle-Pillmore) (1918–2005)
- Decken – Karl Klaus von der Decken (1833–1865)
- Decne. – Joseph Decaisne (1807–1882)
- D.Edwards – Dianne Edwards (born 1942)
- De Franceschi – D. De Franceschi (fl. 1993)
- Degen – Árpád von Degen (1866–1934)
- Degl. – Jean Vincent Yves Degland (1773–1841)
- Deguchi – Hironori Deguchi (born 1948)
- Dehgan – Bijan Dehgan (fl. 1988)
- Dehnh. – Friedrich Dehnhardt (1787–1870)
- Deinboll – Peter Vogelius Deinboll (1783–1874)
- de Kok – Rogier Petrus Johannes de Kok (born 1964)
- de Kruif – A.P.M. de Kruif (fl. 1984)
- Delahouss. – A. James Delahoussaye (fl. 1967)
- DeLaney – Kris R. DeLaney (fl. 1989)
- de Lange – Peter James de Lange (born 1966)
- de Laub. – David John de Laubenfels (1925–2016)
- Delavay – Pierre Jean Marie Delavay (1834–1895)
- D.E.Lee – Daphne Euphemia Lee (born 1950)
- Deless. – Jules Paul Benjamin Delessert (1773–1847)
- Deleuze – Joseph Philippe François Deleuze (1753–1835)
- Delev. – Theodore Delevoryas (1929–2017)
- Delf – Ellen Marion Delf (1883–1980)
- Delile – Alire Raffeneau Delile (1778–1850)
- Dell – Bernard Dell (born 1949)
- D.Ellis – David Ellis (1874–1937)
- Demoly – Jean-Pierre Demoly (born 1951)
- Dempster – Lauramay Tinsley Dempster (1905–1997)
- De M.Wang – De-Ming Wang (born 1970)
- Denham – Dixon Denham (1786–1828)
- Denis – Marcel Denis (1897–1929)
- Denisse – Étienne Denisse (1785–1861)
- Dennes – George Edgar Dennes (1817–1871)
- Dennst. – August Wilhelm Dennstedt (1776–1826)
- De Not. – Giuseppe De Notaris (1805–1877) ("Giuseppe" sometimes as "Josephus")
- Deori – Numal Chandra Deori (fl. 1988)
- Deplanche – Émile Deplanche (1824–1875)
- Deppe – Ferdinand Deppe (1794–1861)
- De Puydt – Paul Émile de Puydt (1810–1891)
- Derbès – August Alphonse Derbès (1818–1894)
- Dermek – Aurel Dermek (1925–1989)
- de Roon – Adrianus Cornelis de Roon (1928–2011)
- Desc. – Bernard Marie Descoings (1931–2018)
- Deschamps – Louis Auguste Deschamps (1765–1842)
- Déségl. – Pierre Alfred Déséglise (1823–1883)
- Desf. – René Louiche Desfontaines (1750–1833)
- De Smet – Louis De Smet (1813–1887)
- Des Moul. – Charles Robert Alexandre des Moulins (1798–1875)
- Desp. – Jean-Baptiste-René Pouppé Desportes (1704–1748)
- Despr. – Jean-Marie Despréaux (erroneously Louis Despréaux Saint-Sauveur) (1794–1843)
- Desr. – Louis Auguste Joseph Desrousseaux (1753–1838)
- Desv. – Nicaise Auguste Desvaux (1784–1856)
- Detmers – Freda Detmers (1867–1934)
- De Vis – Charles Walter De Vis (1829–1915)
- de Vogel – Eduard Ferdinand de Vogel (born 1942)
- de Vos – Cornelis de Vos (1806–1895)
- de Vries – Hugo de Vries (1848–1935)
- de Vriese – Willem Hendrik de Vriese (1806–1862)
- de Wet – Johannes Martenis Jacob de Wet (1927–2009)
- Dewèvre – Alfred Aloys Dewèvre (1866–1897)
- Dewey – Chester Dewey (1784–1867)
- De Wild. – Émile Auguste Joseph De Wildeman (1866–1947)
- De Winter – Bernard de Winter (1924–2017)
- de Wit – Hendrik de Wit (1909–1999)
- Deyl – Miloš Deyl (1906–1985)
- D.Fairchild – David Fairchild (1869–1954)
- D.Fang – Ding Fang (born 1920)
- D.F.Austin – Daniel Frank Austin (1943–2015)
- D.F.Brunt. – Daniel Francis Brunton (born 1948)
- D.F.Cutler – David Frederick Cutler (born 1939)
- D.F.Fisch. – Daniel Ferdinand Heinrich Albert Fischer (1865–1927)
- D.G.Burch – Derek George Burch (born 1933)
- D.G.Lloyd – David Graham Lloyd (1937–2006)
- D.G.Long – David Geoffrey Long (born 1948)
- D.Hanb. – Daniel Hanbury (1825–1875)
- D.Hawksw. – David Leslie Hawksworth (born 1946)
- D.H.Davis – Diana Helen Davis (born 1945)
- D.H.Goldman – Douglas H. Goldman (fl. 1995)
- D.H.Kent – Douglas Henry Kent (1920–1998)
- D.H.Norris – Daniel H. Norris (1933–2017)
- D.H.Scott – Dukinfield Henry Scott (1854–1934)
- D.H.Wagner – David H. Wagner (born 1945)
- Di Capua – Ernesta Di Capua (1875–1943)
- Dice – James C. Dice (fl. 1995)
- Dicks. – James (Jacobus) J. Dickson (1738–1822)
- Didr. – Didrik Ferdinand Didrichsen (1814–1887)
- Dieck – Georg Dieck (1847–1925)
- Dieckmann – Juana G. Dieckmann (1888–1960)
- Died. – Hermann Diedicke (1865–1940)
- Dieder. – Christoph Diederichs (fl. 1989)
- Diederich – Paul Diederich (born 1959)
- Diederichsen – Axel Diederichsen (fl. 2001)
- Diego – Nelly Diego (fl. 2001)
- Diego-Esc. – Valentina Diego-Escobar (fl. 2008)
- Diehl – William Webster Diehl (1891–1978)
- Diekm. – Rolf Diekmann (fl. 2000)
- Diels – Friedrich Ludwig Emil Diels (1874–1945)
- Diem – José Diem (1899–1986)
- Dien – B.S. Dien (fl. 1998)
- Dierb. – Johann Heinrich Dierbach (1788–1845)
- Dierckx – Frans Dierckx (1863–1937)
- Diers – Lothar Diers (fl. 1978)
- Diesing – Karl (Carl) Moriz (Moritz) Diesing (1800–1867)
- Dietel – Paul Dietel (1860–1947)
- Dieter. – Carl Friedrich Dieterich (1734–1805)
- Dieterle – Jennie van Ackeren Dieterle (1909–1999)
- Dietrichson – E. Dietrichson (fl. 1954)
- Dietz – Samuel M. Dietz (fl. 1970)
- Dietzow – W. Ludwig von Dietzow (died 1945)
- Diguet – Léon Diguet (1859–1926)
- Dill. – Johann Jacob Dillenius (1684–1747)
- Dillwyn – Lewis Weston Dillwyn (1778–1855)
- Dilst – Floor J. H. van Dilst (born 1934)
- D.I.Morris – Dennis Ivor Morris (1924–2005)
- Ding Hou – Ding Hou (1921–2008)
- Dingler – Hermann Dingler (1846–1935)
- Dinsm. – John Edward Dinsmore (1862–1951)
- Dinter – Moritz Kurt Dinter (1868–1945)
- Dippel – Leopold Dippel (1827–1914)
- Dissing – Henry Dissing (1931–2009)
- D.J.Bedford – David John Bedford (born 1952)
- D.J.Carr – Denis John Carr (1915–2008)
- D.J.Crawford – Daniel J. Crawford (born 1942)
- D.J.Dixon – Dale J. Dixon (fl. 1997)
- D.J.Galloway – David John Galloway (1942–2014)
- D.J.Keil – David John Keil (born 1946)
- D.J.Middleton – David John Middleton (born 1963)
- D.J.Murphy – Daniel J. Murphy (fl. 2009)
- D.J.N.Hind – David John Nicholas Hind (born 1957)
- D.Jord. – Denis Jordan (fl. 1987)
- D.Legrand – Carlos Maria Diego Enrique Legrand (1901–1986)
- D.Livingstone – David Livingstone (1813–1873)
- D.L.Jacobs – Donald Leroy Jacobs (born 1919)
- D.L.Jones – David Lloyd Jones (born 1944)
- D.Löve – Doris Löve (1918–2000)
- D.L.Roberts – David Lesford Roberts (born 1974)
- D.M.Andrews – Darwin Maxson Andrews (1869–1938)
- D.M.Bates – David Martin Bates (born 1935)
- D.M.Britton – Donald Macphail Britton (1923–2012)
- D.M.Hend. – Douglas Mackay Henderson (1927–2007)
- D.M.Moore – David Moresby Moore (1933–2013)
- D.Mohr – Daniel Matthias Heinrich Mohr (1780–1808)
- D.Morris – Daniel Morris (1844–1933)
- D.M.Porter – Duncan MacNair Porter (born 1937)
- D.Müll.-Doblies – Dietrich Müller-Doblies (born 1938)
- D.Müll.-Doblies & U.Müll.-Doblies (D. et U. M.-D., D. & U. M.-D.) – Dietrich Müller-Doblies & Ute Müller-Doblies
- D.Naras. – D. Narasimhan (born 1960)
- D.Nicolle – Dean Nicolle (born 1974)
- Dobell – Clifford Dobell (1886–1949)
- Dobignard – Alain Dobignard (fl. 1987)
- Dobrocz. – Dariya Nikitichna Dobroczajeva (1916–1995)
- Dockrill – Alick William Dockrill (1915–2011)
- Dod – Donald Dungan Dod (1912–2008)
- Dode – Louis-Albert Dode (1875–1943)
- Dodoens – Rembert Dodoens (also as Rembertus Dodonaeus) (1517–1585)
- Dodson – Calaway Homer Dodson (1928–2020)
- Doidge – Ethel Mary Doidge (1887–1965)
- Döll – Johann Christoph Döll (1808–1885)
- Dollfus – Gustave Frédéric Dollfus (1850–1931)
- Dombrain – Henry Honywood Dombrain (1818–1905)
- Domin – Karel Domin (1882–1953)
- Domke – Friedrich Walter Domke (1899–1988)
- Done – Christopher Charles Done (born 1946)
- Donn – James Donn (1758–1813)
- Donn.Sm. – John Donnell Smith (1829–1928)
- Door. – Simeon Gottfried Albert Doorenbos (1891–1980)
- Dop – Paul Louis Amans Dop (1876–1954)
- Dorf – Erling Dorf (1905–1984)
- Dörfelt – Heinrich Dörfelt (born 1940)
- Dörfl. – Ignaz Dörfler (1866–1950)
- Dorner – József Dorner (1808–1873)
- Doronkin – Vladimir M. Doronkin (born 1950)
- Dorr – Laurence Joseph Dorr (born 1953)
- Dorsett – Palemon Howard Dorsett (1862–1943)
- Dostál – Josef Dostál (1903–1999)
- Douglas – David Douglas (1798–1834)
- Douglass M.Hend. – Douglass Miles Henderson (1938–1996)
- Douin – Charles Isidore Douin (1858–1944)
- Doum. – François Doumergue (?1858–1938)
- Doust – Andrew N.L. Doust (fl. 1992)
- Dowe – John Leslie Dowe (fl. 1993)
- Doweld – Alexander Borissovitch Doweld (born 1973)
- Dowell – Philip Dowell (1864–1936)
- Downie – Dorothy G. Downie (1894–1960)
- Downing – Trisha L. Downing (fl. 2004)
- D.Parodi – Domingo Parodi (1823–1890)
- D.P.Banks – David P. Banks (fl. 1998)
- D.Popenoe – Dorothy Kate Popenoe (1899–1932)
- D.P.Ye – De Ping Ye (fl. 2014)
- Drabble – Eric Frederic Drabble (1887–1933)
- Dragend. – Otto Dragendorff (?1902–1935)
- Drake – Emmanuel Drake del Castillo (1855–1904)
- Drapiez – Pierre Auguste Joseph Drapiez (1778–1856)
- Drees – Friedrich Wilhelm Drees
- Drège – Johann Franz Drège (1794–1881)
- Drejer – Salomon Thomas Nicolai Drejer (1813–1842)
- Dressler – Robert Louis Dressler (1927–2019)
- D.R.Hunt – David Richard Hunt (1938–2019)
- Dring – Donald Malcolm Dring (1932–1978)
- Drinnan – Andrew N. Drinnan (fl. 1986)
- D.Rivera – Diego Rivera Núñez (born 1958)
- D.R.Morgan – David R. Morgan (fl. 1990)
- Drobow – Vasiliĭ Petrovich Drobow (1885–1956)
- Droissart – Vincent Droissart (fl. 2007)
- D.Royen – David van Royen (1727–1799)
- Druce – George Claridge Druce (1850–1932)
- Drude – Carl Georg Oscar Drude (1852–1933)
- Drumm. – Thomas Drummond (1780–1835)
- Drury – Heber Drury (1819–1905)
- Dryand. – Jonas Carlsson Dryander (1748–1810)
- D.S.Conant – David Stoughton Conant (1949–2018)
- D.S.Edwards – David Sydney Edwards (born 1948)
- D.Thomas – David Thomas (1776–1859)
- D.T.Rouse – Dean T. Rouse (fl. 2003)
- Dubard – Marcel Marie Maurice Dubard (1873–1914)
- Duboscq – Octave Joseph Duboscq (1868–1943)
- Duby – Jean Étienne Duby (1798–1885)
- Duch. – Pierre Étienne Simon Duchartre (1811–1894)
- Duchass. – Édouard Placide Duchassaing de Fontbressin (1818–1873)
- Duchesne – Antoine Nicolas Duchesne (1747–1827)
- Ducke – Adolpho Ducke (1876–1959)
- Ducker – Sophie Charlotte Ducker (1909–2004)
- Duclaux – Émile Duclaux (1840–1904)
- Dufft – Adolf Dufft (1800–1875)
- Dufour – Léon Jean Marie Dufour (1780–1865)
- Dufr. – Pierre Dufresne (1786–1836)
- Dugand – Armando Dugand (1906–1971)
- Duggar – Benjamin Minge Duggar (1872–1956)
- Duhamel – Henri Louis Duhamel du Monceau (1700–1782)
- Dulac – Joseph Dulac (1827–1897)
- Dum.Cours. – Georges Louis Marie Dumont de Courset (1746–1824)
- Dümmer – Richard Arnold Dümmer (1887–1922)
- Dumort. – Barthélemy Charles Joseph Dumortier (1797–1878)
- Dunal – Michel Félix Dunal (1789–1856)
- Dunkley – Harvey Lawrence Dunkley (born 1910)
- Dunlop – Clyde Robert Dunlop (born 1946)
- Dunn – Stephen Troyte Dunn (1868–1938)
- Dunst. – Galfrid C. K. Dunsterville (1905–1988)
- Dupr. – François Hippolyte Dupret (1853–1932)
- Dupuy – Dominique Dupuy (1812–1885)
- Du Puy – David J. Du Puy (born 1958)
- Duque – Jaramillo Jesus Maria Duque (1785–1862)
- Durand – Elias (Elie) Magloire Durand (1794–1873)
- Durazz. – Antonio Durazzini (fl. 1772)
- Duretto – Marco F. Duretto (born 1964)
- Durieu – Michel Charles Durieu de Maisonneuve (1796–1878)
- Ďuriška – Ondrej Ďuriška (fl. 2021)
- Du Roi – Johann Philipp Du Roi (1741–1785)
- Dürrnb. – Adolf Dürrnberger (1838–1898)
- d'Urv. – Jules Sébastian César Dumont d'Urville (1790–1842)
- Dusén – Per Karl Hjalmar Dusén (1855–1926)
- Duss – Antoine Duss (1840–1924)
- Duthie – John Firminger Duthie (1845–1922)
- Dutilly – Arthème Dutilly (1896–1973)
- Duval – Henri August Duval (1777–1814)
- Duy – Nong Van Duy (fl. 2012)
- Duyfjes – Brigitta Emma Elisabeth Duyfjes (born 1936)
- D.Verma – Durgesh Verma (born 1987)
- D.Vidal – Domingo Vidal (1838–1878)
- D.Watling – D. Watling (fl. 2004)
- Dwig. – Iwan Alexeevič Dwigubskij (1771–1839)
- Dw.Moore – Dwight Munson Moore (1891–1985)
- Dwyer – John Duncan Dwyer (1915–2005)
- D.X.Zhang – Dian Xiang Zhang (born 1963)
- Dyal – Sarah Creecie Dyal (1907–1993)
- Dyer – William Turner Thiselton (Thistleton) Dyer (1843–1928)
- D.Y.Hong – De Yuan Hong or Hong DeYuan(g) (born 1936)
- Dykes – William Rickatson Dykes (1877–1925)
- Dy Phon – Pauline Dy Phon (1933–2010)
- D.Y.Wang – De Yin Wang (fl. 1982)
- D.Zohary – Daniel Zohary (1926–2016)

== E–Z ==
Contents: Top	A	B	C	D	E F	G	H	I J	K L	M	N O	P	Q R	S	T U V	W X Y Z

To find entries for E–Z, use the table of contents above.

== See also ==
- List of South African plant botanical authors
- List of botanists
- Category:Botanists
- List of Russian botanists
- List of zoologists by author abbreviation
