= Claude Thomas Alexis Jordan =

French botanist and taxonomist (1814–1897)

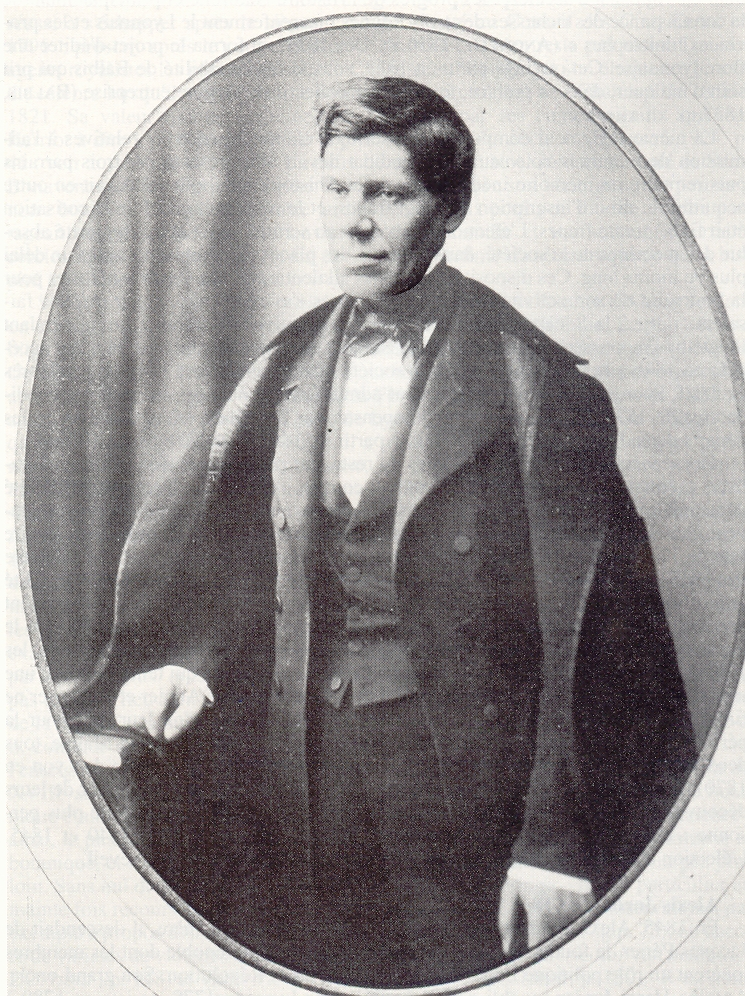
Claud Jordan (1814–1897)

Claude Thomas Alexis Jordan (29 October 1814 in Lyon – 7 February 1897 in Lyon) was a French botanist and taxonomist. The standard author abbreviation Jord. is used to indicate this person as the author when citing a botanical name.

== Life and work ==
Jordan was born in Lyon where his father César was from a wealthy business family and his mother Jeanne-Marie (Adèle) Caquet d’Avaize had a lawyer father. The mathematician Camille Jordan and the namesake politician were cousins. He chose to study natural history rather than become a businessman. From 1836 to 1877 he traveled widely throughout France, collecting many botanical specimens on trips to the Massif Central, the Alps, the Pyrenees as well as on excursions to locations near Lyon. As a member of the Linnaean Society of Lyon, he came under the influence of several local naturalists, including Marc Antoine Timeroy, an amateur botanist who would have a profound impact upon his career. At Jordan's extensive botanical garden in Lyon, with his assistant Joseph Victor Viviand-Morel, he cultivated many thousands of different varieties of plants.

Known for his micro-morphological analysis of plants — as a taxonomist he proposed a narrow conceptualization for the determination of species. Because of this, he was widely criticized for his tendency to differentiate species too finely. In regards to the 1,685 species that he named, Johannes Paulus Lotsy referred to them as "Jordanianas", while Georges Coutagne called them "Jordanias". In a September 15, 1874 issue of Revue des deux Mondes, Jules Émile Planchon published an article regarding Jordan's narrow division of species, titled "Le morcellement de l'espèce en botanique et le Jordanisme" (The fragmentation of botanical species and "Jordanism").

During his lifetime, he created one of the largest herbariums known to exist, as he acquired exsiccatae series from around 200 other botanists. In 1849 the plant genus Jordania was named in his honor by Pierre Edmond Boissier and Theodor von Heldreich. He also has several species named after him; Rosa jordani (Désègl.) and Viola jordani (Hanry) being a couple of examples.

== In literature ==
Claude Thomas Alexis Jordan served as a prototype for the hero of the comedy by Azerbaijani writer Mirza Fatali Akhundov "The story of Monsieur Jourdan, a botanist and the dervish Mastalishah, a famous sorcerer".

== Selected writings ==
- Observations sur plusiers Plantes nouvelles, rares ou critiques de la France, 1846. (Considered to be Jordan's magnum opus).
- "Pugillus plantarum novarum præsertim gallicarum", 1852.
- De l'origine des diverses variétés ou espèces d'arbres fruitiers, 1853.
- Diagnoses d'espèces nouvelles ou méconnues, 1864.
- "Icones ad floram Europae novo fundamento instaurandam spectantes", Paris : F. Savy (with Jules Pierre Fourreau) 1866-1868.
- Catalogue de la bibliothèque botanique du feu Alexis Jordan (Lyon 1814-97) dont la vente aura lieu à Paris les 4. - 9. mai 1903, (1903).
