= Thielens =

Thielens is a surname. Notable people with the surname include:

- Armand Thielens (1833–1878), Belgian naturalist
- Émile Thielens (1854–1911), Belgian architect

== See also ==
- Thielen
