= Tricker =

Tricker is a surname and occasional given name. Notable people with this name include:

- Chick Tricker, American gangster in the early 20th century
- Don Tricker, New Zealand softball player and coach
- Dudley Tricker (1944–1998), South African cricketer
- Gary Tricker (1938–2021), New Zealand painter and printmaker
- Reg Tricker (1904–1990), English footballer
- Robert Ian Tricker (born 1933), British expert in corporate governance
- Walter Pettit Tricker (1823–1907), New Zealand farmer and victim of injustice
- William Tricker (1852–1916), English-born estate gardener and aquatic plant grower in the United States
- John Tricker Conquest (1789–1866), British accoucheur and physician

== See also ==
- Tricker's, a British footwear company established by Joseph Tricker
- Tommy Tricker and the Stamp Traveller, a Canadian film
