= Varaprasad =

Varaprasad is a name. Notable people with the name include:

- Deva Varaprasad, Indian politician
- K.S. Varaprasad, Indian agricultural scientist
- Vineeth Varaprasad, Indian film director
- K. I. Varaprasad Reddy (born 1948), Indian entrepreneur
- Velagapalli Varaprasada Rao, Indian politician
- Issac Varaprasad, Indian bishop
