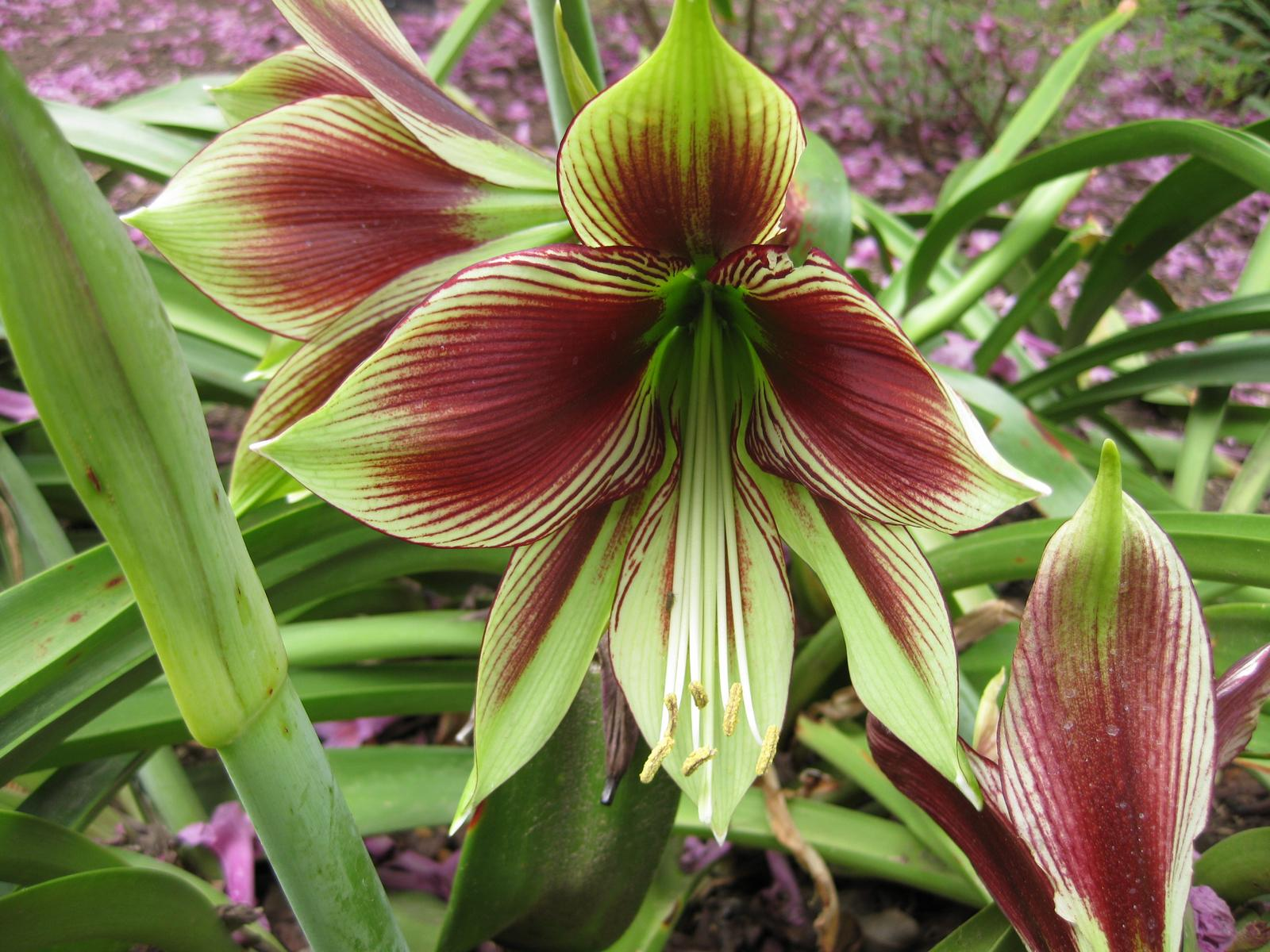

Scientific classification
- Kingdom: Plantae
- Clade: Tracheophytes
- Clade: Angiosperms
- Clade: Monocots
- Order: Asparagales
- Family: Amaryllidaceae
- Subfamily: Amaryllidoideae
- Genus: Hippeastrum
- Species: H. papilio

Binomial name
- Hippeastrum papilio (Ravenna) Van Scheepen

Synonyms
- Amaryllis papilio Ravenna

= Hippeastrum papilio =

Species of flowering plant

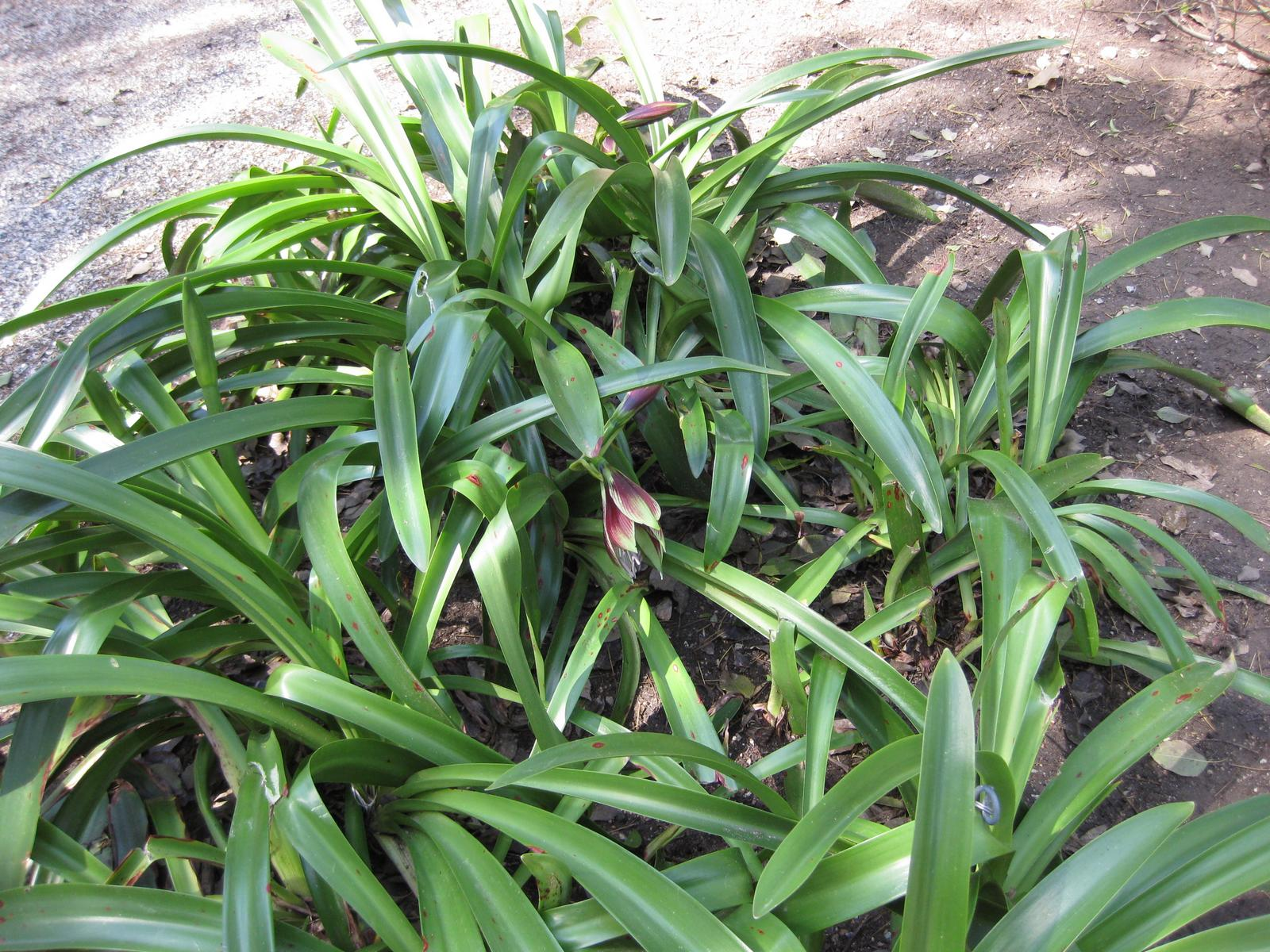

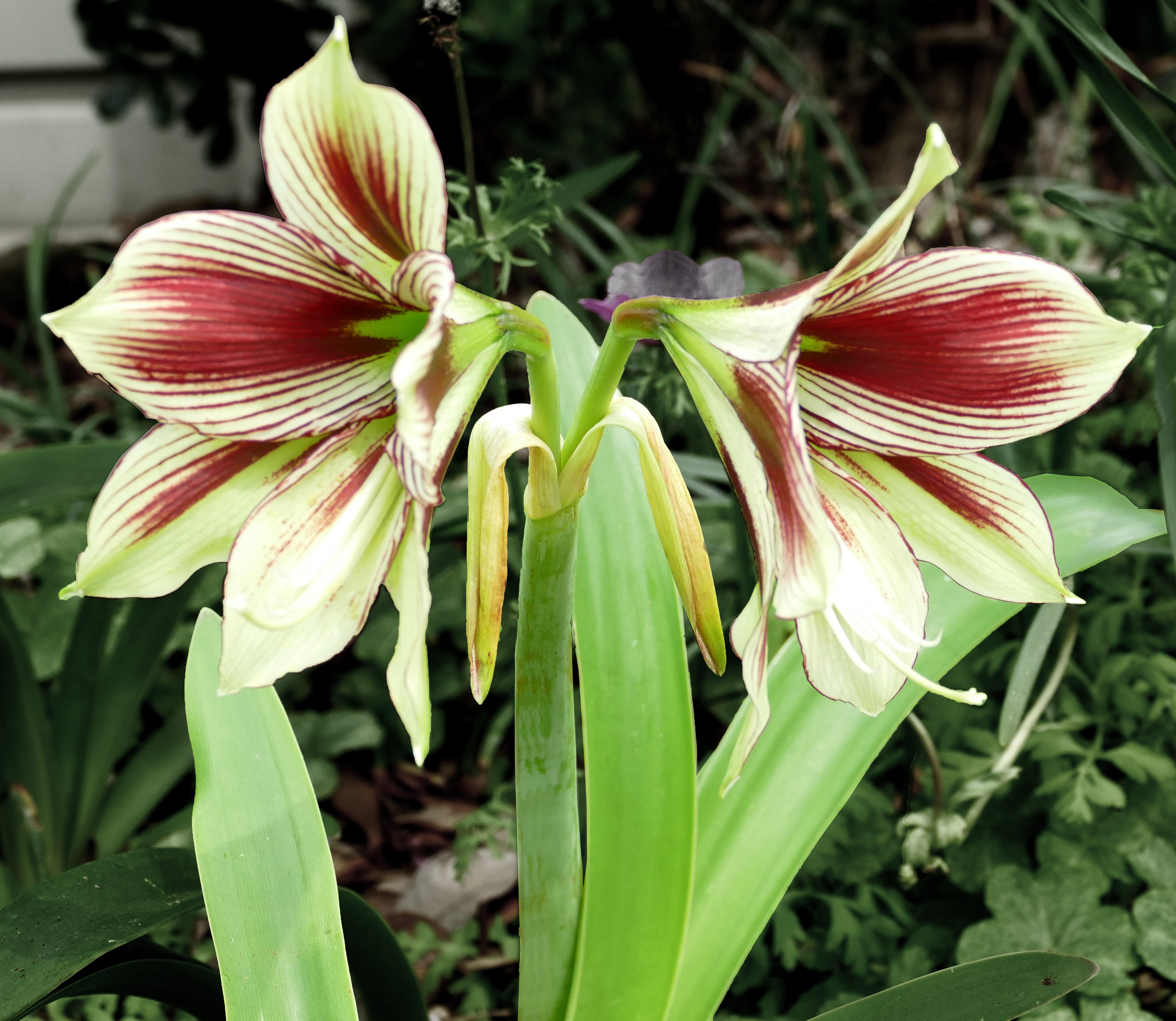
Butterfly Amaryllis

Hippeastrum papilio is a flowering perennial herbaceous bulbous plant, in the family Amaryllidaceae, native to southern Brazil.

== Description ==
Colours are variable from white to creamy-green, or dark apple-green with carmine, maroon or purple striations.

== Taxonomy ==
Collected in the 1960s, it was originally described by Pierfelice Ravenna in 1970 as a species of Amaryllis, it was transferred to Hippeastrum by Johan Van Scheepen in 1997.

=== Etymology ===
The specific epithet papilio means butterfly in Latin.

== Distribution ==
Tropical rain forests of the Atlantic coast of southern Brazil. While its natural habitat is shrinking, it is becoming increasingly popular in horticulture.

== Ecology ==
This plant is epiphytic.

== Conservation ==
H. papilio is considered endangered.

== Sources ==
- The Plant List (2012). "Hippeastrum papilio".
- GBIF: Hippeastrum papilio
- Zuloaga, F. O., O. Morrone, M. J. Belgrano, C. Marticorena & E. Marchesi. (eds.) 2008. Catálogo de las Plantas Vasculares del Cono Sur (Argentina, Sur de Brasil, Chile, Paraguay y Uruguay). Monogr. Syst. Bot. Missouri Bot. Gard. 107. 2008 ISSN 2250-6365
- International Bulb Society: Hippeastrum papilio (image)
- Forzza, R. C. et al. 2010 onwards. Lista de espécies Flora do Brasil
