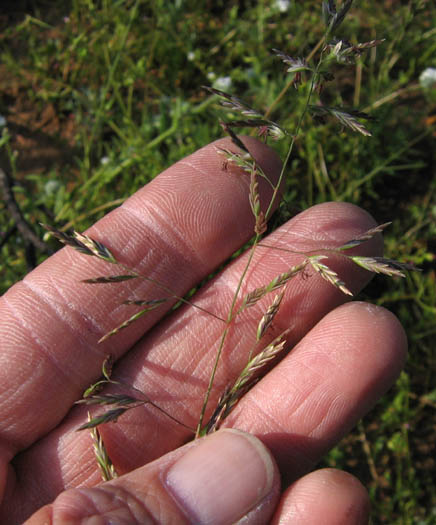

Conservation status
- Secure (NatureServe)

Scientific classification
- Kingdom: Plantae
- Clade: Tracheophytes
- Clade: Angiosperms
- Clade: Monocots
- Clade: Commelinids
- Order: Poales
- Family: Poaceae
- Subfamily: Pooideae
- Genus: Poa
- Species: P. secunda

Binomial name
- Poa secunda J.Presl

Synonyms
- N O T E : This list has been aggregated from three sources, each having considerably differing lists of taxa: Festuca oregona Vasey; Glyceria canbyi Scribn.; Poa ampla Merr.; P. brachyglossa Piper; P. buckleyana Nash; P. canbyi (Scribn.) Howell; P. confusa Rydb.; P. englishii H.St.John & Hardin; P. gracillima Vasey; P. g. var. multnomae (Piper) C.L.Hitchc.; P. incurva Scribn. & T.A.Williams; P. juncifolia Scribn.; P. j. var. juncifolia; P. j. subsp. porteri D.D.Keck; P. j. var. ampla (Merr.) Dorn; P. laevigata Scribn.; P. nevadensis Vasey ex Scribn.; P. n. var. juncifolia (Scribn.) Beetle; P. orcuttiana Vasey; P. sandbergii Vasey; P. scabrella (Thurb.) Benth. ex Vasey; P. secunda Zea ex Roem. & Schult. (nom inval.); P. se. var. elongata (Vasey) Dorn (poss.); P. se. var. incurva (Scribn. & T.A.Williams) Beetle (poss.); P. se. subsp. juncifolia (Scribn.) Soreng (poss.); P. se. subsp. secunda; P. se. var. stenophylla (Vasey ex Beal) Beetle (poss.); P. stenantha var. sandbergii (Vasey) B.Boivin

= Poa secunda =

Species of grass

Poa secunda (variously known by the common names of Sandberg bluegrass, alkali bluegrass, big bluegrass, Canby's bluegrass, Nevada bluegrass, one-sided bluegrass, Pacific bluegrass, pine bluegrass, slender bluegrass, wild bluegrass, and curly bluegrass) is a widespread species of perennial bunchgrass native to North and South America. It is highly resistant to drought conditions, and provides excellent fodder; and has also been used in controlling soil erosion, and as revegetator, often after forest fires. Cultivars include 'Canbar', 'Service', 'Sherman', and 'Supernova'. Historically, indigenous Americans, such as the Gosiute of Utah, have used P. secunda for food. It was originally described botanically in 1830 by Jan Svatopluk Presl, from a holotype collected from Chile by Thaddäus Haenke in 1790.

== Subspecies and varieties ==
Poa secunda is highly variable, and its classification has long been disputed. Many of the forms now placed in it were once treated as separate species. In 1951 C. L. Hitchcock divided it into two groups containing seven species in total. The Flora of North America treats these two groups as subspecies. It notes that they overlap almost completely in their morphology but differ in their ecology and cytology. In 2018 Robert Soreng and Lynn Gillespie divided the species into six varieties in two subspecies, juncifolia and secunda. Under subspecies juncifolia they placed varieties juncifolia, nevadensis and ampla; under subspecies secunda they placed varieties secunda, gracillima and scabrella.

=== Distinguishing the two subspecies ===
The two subspecies are separated mainly by hairs on the lemmas (the outer bracts of each floret), by how the new shoots branch at the base, by the texture of the leaves, and by the length of the ligules on the new shoots:

Trait	subsp. juncifolia	subsp. secunda
Lemmas	Usually hairless; the keel and marginal veins only occasionally sparsely hairy at the base	Sparsely to densely covered in short hairs over the lower two-thirds
Basal branching	Mainly extravaginal (new shoots break out through the leaf sheaths)	Mixed, or mainly intravaginal (new shoots grow up inside the sheaths)
Leaves	Slightly lax to firm; stay intact through the growing season	Usually lax; wither with age
Ligules of new shoots	Up to 2 mm long	Usually longer than 2 mm

=== Poa secunda subsp. juncifolia ===
Poa secunda subsp. juncifolia (Scribn.) Soreng is a perennial grass 3–12 decimetres (0.98–3.94 ft) tall. Its leaf blades are usually less than 1.5 mm wide, firm, tightly folded and rolled inward so that they keep their shape, and often have a bluish-grey (glaucous) bloom. The ligule is 0.5–6 mm long, and the lemmas are 3.5–6 mm long and hairless, or rarely sparsely hairy on the keel. It has about 63 chromosomes (2n = ±63). In California it grows from sagebrush scrub to lower montane forest at 900–3,000 metres (3,000–9,800 ft), often in alkaline depressions. Its range extends beyond California to southern Canada, North Dakota and New Mexico. In saline meadows it hybridises with Kentucky bluegrass (P. pratensis), producing Poa ×limosa.

The subspecies includes three forms that were formerly treated as separate species. Soreng and Gillespie (2018) recognise them as varieties.

P. secunda var. ampla (big bluegrass)

The largest of the three. The Jepson eFlora describes it as 6–12 decimetres (2.0–3.9 ft) tall with flat, usually glaucous leaf blades, growing in non-alkaline uplands. A USDA NRCS plant guide gives a height of 60–130 centimetres (24–51 in), leaves 1.5–3.5 mm wide, a short, rounded to squared-off ligule, and a panicle 10–18 cm long. It describes the habitat as sagebrush slopes and meadows. The cultivars 'Service' and 'Sherman' belong to this form.

P. secunda var. juncifolia (alkali bluegrass)

A shorter plant, 30–70 centimetres (12–28 in) tall, with rolled leaves less than 2 mm wide, a short ligule and a panicle 7–15 cm long. Its ligule is truncate (squared off), and it typically grows in alkaline sites such as alkaline meadows.

P. secunda var. nevadensis (Nevada bluegrass)

Distinguished by a long, pointed (acute) ligule. The NRCS plant guide gives a ligule 1.5 to 6 mm long, a height of up to 100 centimetres (39 in), leaves 1–3 mm wide and a panicle 10–18 cm long. It grows in moist sagebrush areas and foothills. Like var. juncifolia it is often found on alkaline soils, but it also occurs in desert uplands.

=== Poa secunda subsp. secunda ===
Poa secunda subsp. secunda has basal tufts of leaves that are usually tiny to medium-sized, less often robust. Its stems (culms) are (10)15–100 cm tall. The panicles are 2–15(20) cm long, usually narrowly lance-shaped to egg-shaped, and contracted at maturity. It has more rounded lemma keels than related species, with hairs between the lemma veins, and a callus that is hairless or has hairs shorter than 0.2 mm.

It generally grows in drier habitats than subsp. juncifolia and is also common in alpine habitats. It ranges from Alaska and the western United States through the Rocky Mountains to the Great Plains, with outlying populations as far east as Ontario, Quebec and Maine. The Flora of North America describes several intergrading forms within it:

- sandbergii: tiny plants that flower in early spring, growing on stony and mossy ground
- scabrella: plants with a rough (scabrous) surface, mainly from west of the Cascade–Sierra Nevada axis
- canbyi: smoother, large plants that extend further east; the cultivar 'Canbar' belongs to this form
- gracillima: slender, sparse plants of generally moist, shady habitats, whose panicles stay open

Soreng and Gillespie (2018) recognise gracillima and scabrella as varieties of subsp. secunda, alongside var. secunda.

== Native distribution ==
- In North America, Poa secunda is native to Canada (in Alberta; British Columbia; eastern Quebec; southern Saskatchewan; southern Yukon Territory; and, rarely, in Ontario), the U.S. (in southeastern Alaska; Arizona; California; Colorado; the Dakotas; Idaho; Isle Royale in Michigan; Montana; northwestern Nebraska; Nevada; New Mexico; Oregon; Utah; Washington; and Wyoming), and northwestern Mexico.
- In South America, it is native to Argentina (found in Chubut; Neuquén; and Santa Cruz), and central Chile.
