= Hippolyte Hanry =

Hippolyte Hanry (15 April 1807, Casale Monferrato, Italy – 1893) was a French botanical collector and taxonomist.

From 1831 onward, he served as justice of the peace in Le Luc, a town in the department of Var. As a botanist, he collected plants in the vicinity of Le Luc.

He was the author of the botanical section of the 1853 "Prodrome d'histoire naturelle du département du Var" (Prodomus on the natural history of Var). His herbarium specimens are presently housed at the Muséum d'Histoire Naturelle in Nîmes and in the herbarium at the University of Montpellier.

Plants with the specific epithet of hanryi are named in his honor.

== Published works ==
- Prodrome d'histoire naturelle du département du Var. Draguignan, Garcin, 490 p. — Botanique par Hanry, 264 p. (1853).
- Mercurialis Huetii (Bull. Soc.d' études scient, de Draguignan, p. p. 252-254), 1862 - treatise on the species Mercurialis huetii.
- Cryptogamie. Catalogue des Mousses et Hépatiques de Provence. Aix, Remondet-Aubin, 22 p. 1867 - Cryptogams, catalog on mosses and hepatics of Provence.
