= Victoria Anne Wassell Graham =

British botanist

Victoria Anne Wassell Graham née Smith (born 1950), is a British botanist who worked at the Natural History Museum.

She studied Plant taxonomy at Reading University where she obtained an M.Sc. in Pure and Applied Plant Taxonomy (1973) and a Ph.D. with the thesis "Taxonomic studies in Justicia".

She was born Victoria Anne Wassell Smith and married John Graham in 1978.

The standard author abbreviation V.A.W.Graham is used to indicate this person as the author when citing a botanical name.

The standard author abbreviation V.A.W.Sm. is used to indicate this person as the author when citing a botanical name.
