= T. S. Nayar =

Themath Soman Nayar is an Indian Conservation Biologist specialized in plant-animal interaction, angiosperm taxonomy and palynology. He was trained in these fields from Botanical Survey of India, Sardar Patel University and Birbal Sahni Institute of Paleobotany. From 1991 to 2012 he was the Head of the Division of Conservation Biology, Jawaharlal Nehru Tropical Botanic Garden and Research Institute, Thiruvananthapuram.

Dr. Nayar created a research group in the area of plant-animal interaction (mutualism) and has published several books and research papers.
He also served as the Executive Editor of Rheedea (An International Journal from Indian Association for Angiosperm Taxonomy, India) from 2003 to 2008.

== Major publications ==
- Nayar, T. S., Rasiya Beegam, A. and M. Sibi 2014. Flowering Plants of the Western Ghats, India (2 volumes). Tropical Botanic Garden and Research Institute, Thiruvananthapuram, Kerala. 1700 pp.
- Nayar, T. S., Rasiya Beegam, A., Mohanan, N., Rajkumar, G. and M. Sibi 2012. Plants of Kerala, India. Tropical Botanic Garden and Research Institute, Thiruvananthapuram, Kerala. (An interactive CD containing details of 5023 taxa of flowering plants (4677 species 57 subspecies and 289 varieties) in 1416 genera under 188 families as occurring in the present political boundary of Kerala).
- Bhatt J.R., DJ Macintosh, TS Nayar, CN Pandey and BP Nilaratna (Editors). 2011. Towards Conservation and Management of Mangrove Ecosystems in India. IUCN India.
- Nayar, T. S., Rasiya Beegam, A., Mohanan, N. and G. Rajkumar (assisted by M Sibi) 2006. Flowering Plants of Kerala-A Handbook. Tropical Botanic Garden and Research Institute, Thiruvananthapuram, Kerala. 1069 pp.
- Manoharan, T.M., Biju, S.D., Nayar, T.S., Easa, P.S. (Eds). 1999. Silent Valley whispers of reason. Kerala Forest Department, Thiruvananthapuram, India.
- Tissot, C., H. Chikhi and T.S. Nayar. 1994. Pollen of Wet Evergreen Forests of the Western Ghats, India. French Institute, Pondicherry. 133 pp.
- Nayar, T.S. 1990. Pollen Flora of Maharashtra State, India. Today & Tomorrow Printers and Publishers. 157 pp.
- Nayar, T.S., Koshy, K.C., Sathish Kumar, C., Mohanan, N. and S. Mukunthakumar 1986. Flora of Tropical Botanic Garden, Palode. Tropical Botanic Garden and Research Institute, Trivandrum, Kerala. 144 pp.
