= Ferdinand Bernhard Vietz =

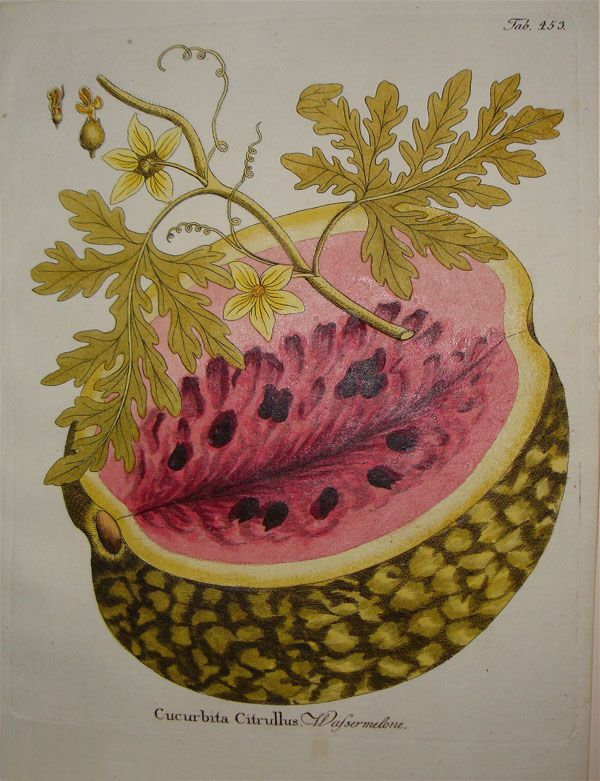
Citrullus lanatus, Plate 453 from 'Icones Plantarum'

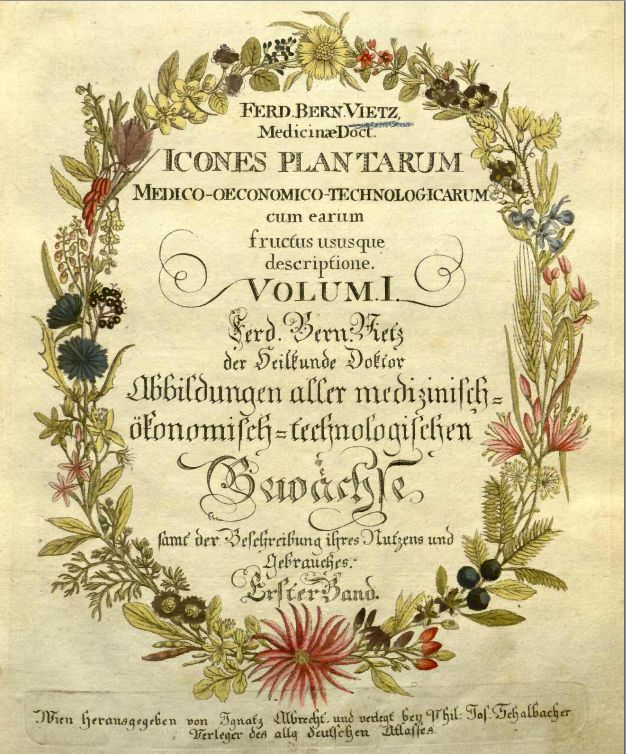

Ferdinand Bernhard Vietz (18 November 1772 – 15 December 1815) was an Austrian pharmacologist, a doctor of the healing arts and professor of forensic medicine at the University of Vienna, and is best known for Icones Plantarum Medico-Oeconomico-Technologicarum cum Earum Fructus ususque Descriptione (1800–1822), an 11-volume compilation of medicinal, culinary and decorative plant species consulted by pharmacologists during the early 1800s. The noted cartographic engraver, Ignaz Alberti, worked on the 1100 hand-coloured copperplate engravings on laid-watermarked paper and completed the work after the early death of Vietz.

Volumes 1 and 2 were printed in Latin and German in adjacent columns. Volumes 3-10 have the title in German only. Volume 11 is a supplementary volume by Joseph Lorenz Kendl. In the introduction to Volume 1, Vietz lists a lengthy bibliography of consulted works, an enormous number of sponsors and a dedication to Maria Theresa, Empress of Austria.

Vietz's monumental work is extremely rare, and the British Natural History Museum writes: The work is “not being held in any other of the United Kingdom's national or public library collections. Only three copies have been found in North American libraries, of which two are certainly fragile and in need of conservation. One copy is in the Austrian National Library.”

On his death, Vietz was succeeded by Joseph Bernt (1770–1842), as professor of state medicine.
