= Étienne Denisse =

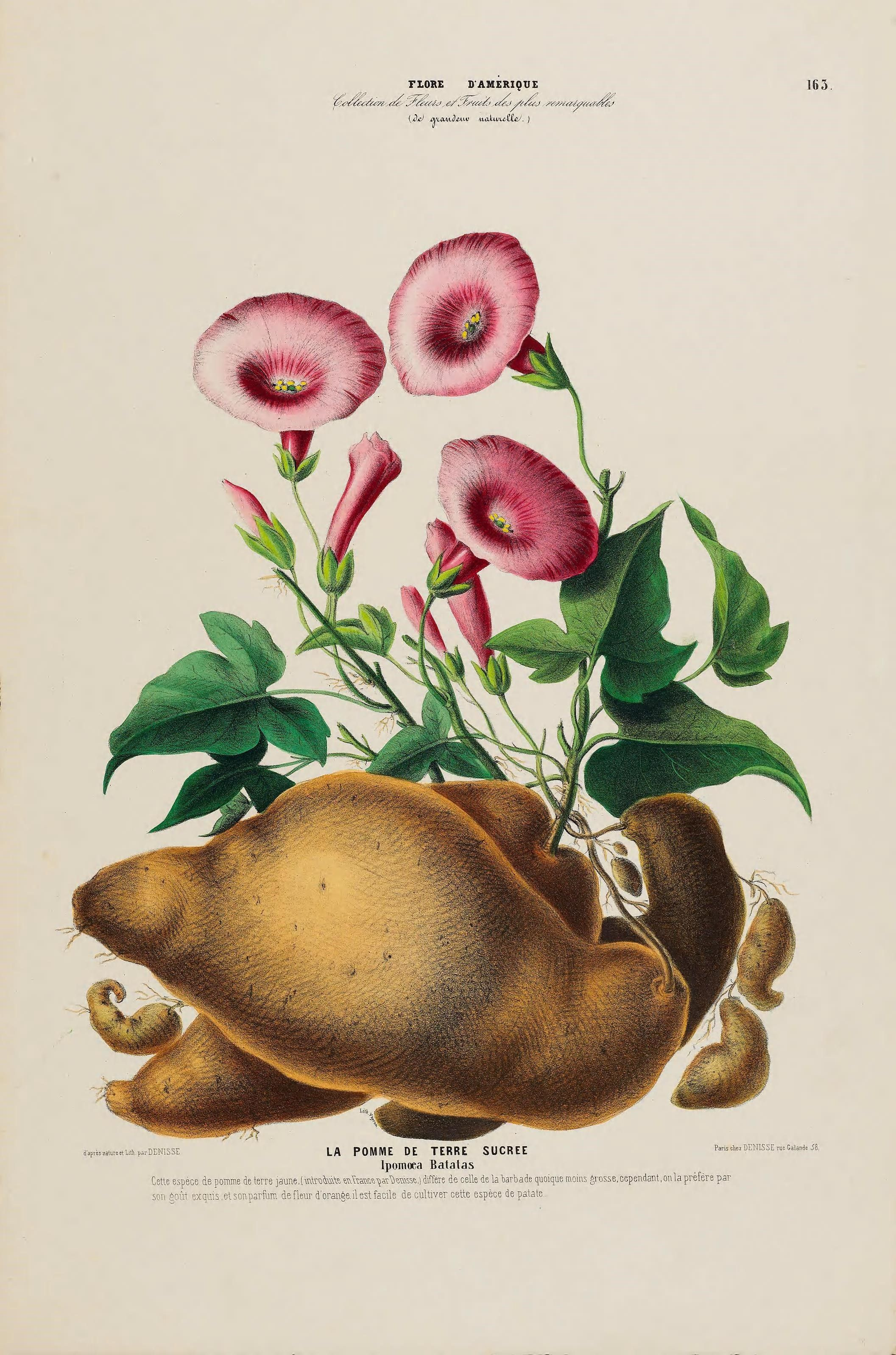
Ipomoea batatas

Étienne Denisse (1785 Carcassonne – 1861 Mourens) was a French botanical artist, lithographer, botanist and horticulturist. The standard author abbreviation Denisse is used to indicate this person as the author when citing a botanical name.

Denisse worked at the horticultural gardens of the National Museum of Natural History, France. He lived for many years in the French West Indies, and was commissioned by the government of Guadeloupe to illustrate and collect the plants of the French Antilles, and to research their pharmaceutical and culinary properties. His work, "Flore d'Amérique", was important for its hand-coloured lithographs.

== Works ==
- Jacqueline Bonnemains, Etienne Denisse . 1989 . Flore des Antilles dessinée par Etienne Denisse in 1814 - Ed. Muséum d'Histoire Naturelle du Havre. 29 pp.
- 1843 . Flore d'Amérique: dessinée d'après nature sur les lieux. Riche collection of plantes les plus remarquables, fleurs & fruits de grosseur & de grandeur naturelle . Ed. Gihaut. 22 pp.
- 1835 . Flore d'Amerique: collection complette des plantes des Antilles, les plus remarquables par leurs propriétés alimentaires, medicales, vénéneuses, ou par leur emploi dans les arts . Ed. Chez Mr. Crochard. 28 pp.
