= Thielen =

Thielen is a surname. Notable people with the surname include:

- Adam Thielen (born 1990), American football player
- Cynthia Thielen (born 1933), American politician
- Friedrich Thielen (1916–1993), German politician
- Hugo Thielen (born 1946), German journalist. author and editor
- Jan Philips van Thielen (1618–1667), Flemish painter
- Karl-Heinz Thielen (born 1940), German football player
- Rob Thielen (born 1961), Dutch businessman
