= Jennie van Ackeren Dieterle =

American botanist (1909–1999)

Jennie van Ackeren Dieterle (August 2, 1909 – April 15, 1999) was an American botanist, plant collector, curator, university teacher and taxonomist. She collected more than 3,700 plant specimens and identified over 570 of them, the majority from the Cucurbitaceae family. Most of the plants collected came from Mexico and the United States. She identified and named nine previously undescribed species of Cucurbitaceae. She has been recognised for her expertise in this family of plants and had an entire genus of Cucurbitaceae from Mexico named after her, known as Dieterlea.

== Career ==
Van Ackeren Dieterle worked at the University of Michigan. Her contributions to the Herbarium collection include an extensive number of plant specimens from 1931 to 1979.

== Selected publications ==
- Dieterle, J. V. A. (1960). Sandbags as a Technical Aid in Mounting Plants. Rhodora, 62(743), 322–324. JSTOR 23305877
- Dieterle, J. V. A. (1975). Parasicyos maculatus, a new genus and species of Cucurbitaceae from Guatemala. Phytologia. 32:289-290.
- Dieterle, J. V. A. (1980). Two new Cucurbitaceae from Mexico. Contributions From the University of Michigan Herbarium. 14:69-73.

The standard author abbreviation Dieterle is used to indicate this person as the author when citing a botanical name.
