= Thomas Velley =

British botanist (1748-1806)

- Born: 15 May 1748
- Died: 6 June 1806 (aged 58)
- Occupation: Botanist
- Spouse: Jane Cleeve
- Father: Reverend Thomas Velley

Thomas Velley (15 May 1748 – 8 June 1806) was an English botanist.

== Life ==
Born at Chipping Ongar, Essex, on 15 May 1748, he was son of the Rev. Thomas Velley of the town. He matriculated from St. John's College, Oxford, on 19 March 1766, and graduated B.C.L. in 1772. He became lieutenant-colonel of the Oxford militia, and was made D.C.L. of the university in 1787. He resided for many years at Bath, and devoted himself to botany, and especially to the study of algæ, collecting chiefly along the south coast. He was the friend and correspondent of Sir James Edward Smith, Dawson Turner, John Stackhouse, Sir Thomas Gery Cullum, Sir William Watson the younger, and Richard Relhan, and became a fellow of the Linnean Society in 1792.

Jumping from a runaway stage-coach at Reading on 6 June 1806, Velley fell and suffered concussion, from which he died on 8 June.

== Legacy ==
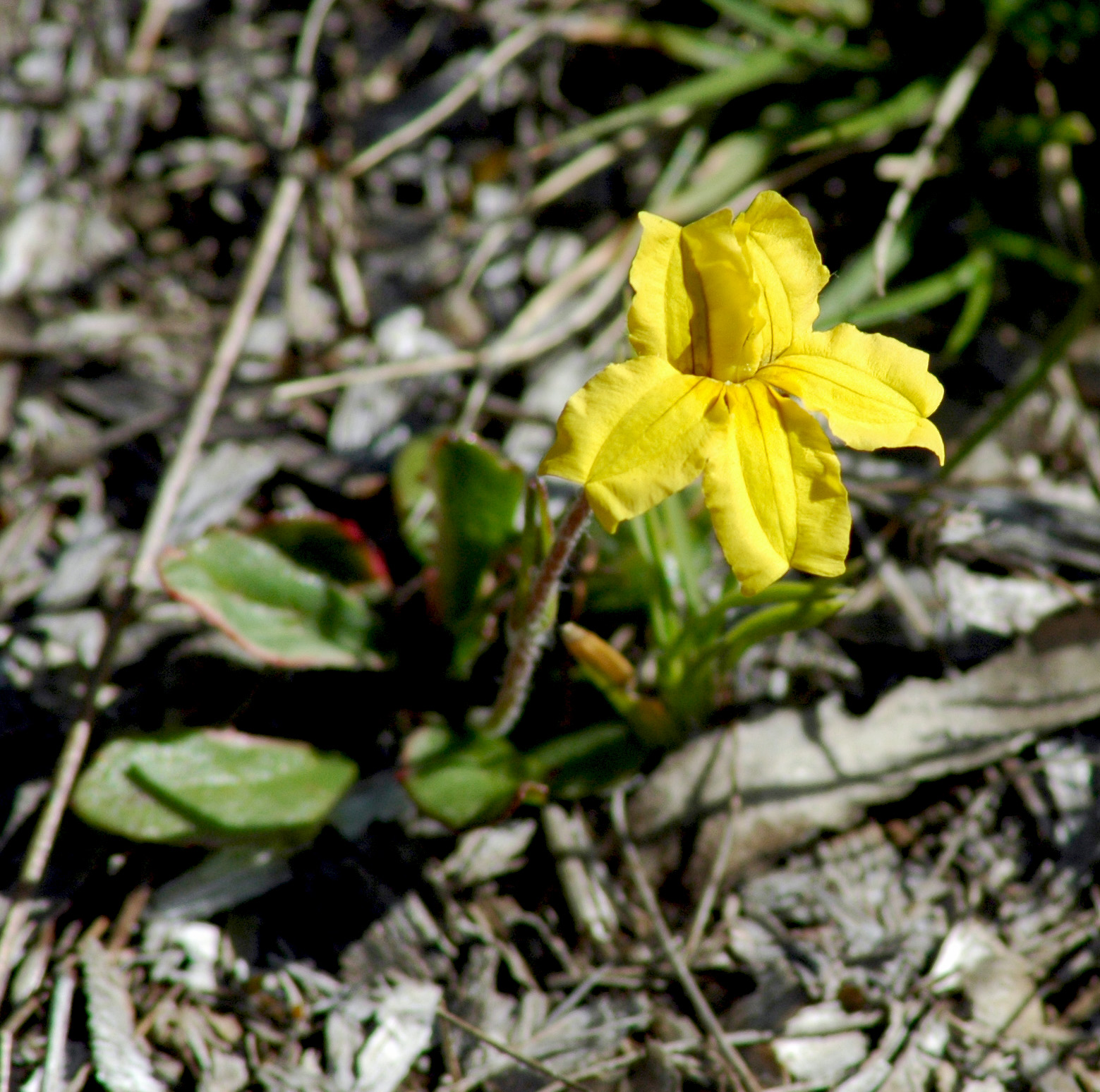
Velleia paradoxa, from the genus named after Thomas Velley

Sir James Edward Smith in 1798 gave the name Velleia, in his honour, to an Australasian genus of flowering plants.

Velley's annotated herbarium, illustrated by dissections and microscopic drawings of grasses and other flowering plants, and especially of algæ, in eight folio volumes, was purchased from his widow by William Roscoe for the Liverpool Botanical Garden.

The herbarium is now held at Liverpool World Museum.

== Works ==
Velley's only independent work was Coloured Figures of Marine Plants found on the Southern Coast of England, illustrated with Descriptions, Bath, 1795, pp. 38, with five coloured plates. He was credited with four papers in the Royal Society's Catalogue (vi. 131), but the last was the work of Smith.

== Attribution ==
This article incorporates text from a publication now in the public domain: Lee, Sidney, ed. (1899). "Velley, Thomas". Dictionary of National Biography. Vol. 58. London: Smith, Elder & Co.
