= Robert Ian Tricker =

British academic

Robert Ian (Bob) Tricker
- Born: 1933 (age 92–93); Coventry, United Kingdom
- Education: Harvard Business School and University of Oxford
- Occupations: Business author, academic
- Known for: Corporate governance expertise
- Spouse: Gretchen Elizabeth Heinrich
- Children: 2
- Website: www.bobtricker.co.uk

Robert Ian (Bob) Tricker (born 1933) is a British academic, business author, and expert in corporate governance who wrote the first book to use the title corporate governance in 1984 based on his research at Nuffield College, Oxford. He was also the founder-editor of the research journal Corporate Governance: An International Review (1993).

Tricker was the founder-editor of Corporate Governance: An International Review and holds honorary professorships at The University of Hong Kong, where he served as Professor of Finance in the Business School from 1986 to 1996, the Open University of Hong Kong and the Hong Kong Baptist University.

== Early life, military service and education ==
Tricker was born in 1933 and left King Henry VIII Grammar School in Coventry at 16. He qualified as a chartered accountant at 21. He served as an officer in the Royal Navy and then studying at the Harvard Business School and Oxford University (P.D. Leake Research Fellow 1966/67).

== Career ==
At the start of his career, Tricker served as financial controller for a manufacturing company.

Tricker became the first professor of management information systems at the University of Warwick (1967–1970). He then returned to Oxford as Director of the Oxford Centre for Management Studies (1971–79) and to a Research Fellowship at Nuffield College, Oxford (1979–1984), where he undertook the research that led to Corporate Governance (1984).

I have always regarded Bob Tricker as the Father of Corporate Governance since his 1984 book introduced me to the words corporate governance. — Sir Adrian Cadbury, author of the first corporate governance code (UK, 1992)

Tricker was awarded a doctorate (D.Litt.) by the UK Council for National Academic Awards, and has served on the Councils of both the Institute of Chartered Accountants in England and Wales and the Institute of Chartered Management Accountants. In 1984 he set up the Hong Kong Management Development Centre, and was appointed Professor of Finance at the University of Hong Kong, a post he held until 1996.

He later became a member of the editorial board of Corporate Governance: An International Review, one of the judges in the annual Hong Kong Institute of CPA's Best Corporate Governance Disclosure Awards competition, and holds honorary or adjunct professorships of three universities. He is an emeritus associate of Aon - Regional Corporate Governance Practice based in Hong Kong.

== Bibliography ==
- The Accountant in Management (Batsford, 1967) OCLC 911736736
- Management Information and Control Systems (Wiley, 1976) ISBN 0-471-88855-9
- The Independent Director (Tolley, 1978) ISBN 0-510-49378-5
- Effective Information Management (Beaumont Executive Press, 1982; Van Nostrand Reinhold, 1984) ISBN 0-442-28307-5
- Corporate Governance (Gower Press, 1984) ISBN 0-566-00749-5
- International Corporate Governance: Text, Cases and Readings (Prentice Hall, 1995) ISBN 0-13-475054-3
- Corporate Governance (editor), in the History of Thought in Management series (Ashgate, 2000) ISBN 1-84014-016-X
- Directors: An A-Z Guide (Economist a-Z Guide) (Economist Books, 2009) ISBN 978-1-84668-167-7
- Corporate Governance - principles, policies and practices (Oxford University Press, 2009) ISBN 978-0-19-955270-2
- (with Gretchen Tricker) Business Ethics: A stakeholder, governance and risk approach (Routledge, 2014) ISBN 978-1-306-28793-7
- Oxford Circus: The Story of Oxford University and Management Education (2015) ISBN 978-1-326-33946-3
- (with Gregg Li) Understanding Corporate Governance in China (Hong Kong University Press, 2019) ISBN 978-988-8455-71-3
- The Evolution of Corporate Governance (Cambridge University Press, 2020) ISBN 9781108974653

== Official reports ==
- Research in Accountancy - a strategy for further work, Social Science Research Council, London 1975
- Inquiry into the Prescription Pricing Authority, for the Minister of Health, HMSO, London 1977
- Governing the Institute; a study on the governance of the Institute of Chartered Accountants in England & Wales, ICAEW, 1983
- The Company Secretary in Hong Kong's Listed Companies, Hong Kong Institute of Company Secretaries, 1995 (with Jessica Leung and Kelly Lee)
- Good Practice in corporate governance – a research paper for the United Nations Development Program, Republic of Korea, 1998
