= Harry W. Trudell =

American amateur botanist & mineralogist (1879-1964)

Harry William Trudell (May 2, 1879 – January 26, 1964) was an American amateur botanist and mineralogist. By profession an accountant, he is best known for his scientific activities. Trudell's spleenwort, a hybrid collected by him in 1920, is named in his honor.

== Business career ==
Trudell was born in Richmond, Virginia, moving with his family to Philadelphia, Pennsylvania at the age of 11. He began working as a clerk by 1900, in the same chair factory that employed his father, a wood turner. By 1916, he had become an accountant and purchasing agent for the Vici Kid Leather Company, headed by Robert H. Foerderer. He continued to work for the company after it was incorporated as Robert H. Foerderer & Co. following Foerderer's death in 1903. There he was involved in the negotiations with Rohm and Haas, who were trying to persuade the company to adopt Oropon in their tanning process. He rose from chief purchasing agent to become secretary of the company, but retired in 1940, when the company dissolved, to devote himself to his hobbies, for which he is best known.

== Mineralogy ==
Trudell had been an amateur naturalist since his move to Philadelphia, and began studying mineralogy with Edgar T. Wherry and others around 1910. Trudell, Wherry, and Sam Gordon (1897–1952) were the co-founders of American Mineralogist, and Trudell handled the finances of the new journal until the end of 1919, when it was handed over to the Mineralogical Society of America. During this period, he also served as president of the Philadelphia Mineralogical Society (1917). Trudell was an active mineral collector, and was honored by Gordon in 1926 by the application of the name "trudellite" to a new mineral. However, this was later shown to be a mixture of substances, and the name was deemed invalid.

== Botany ==
Wherry and Trudell were both avid botanists, as well, and often went on collecting trips together, particularly for ferns. Wherry described him as "for years, the writer's favorite field companion." A specimen collected by Trudell in 1920 proved to be a new hybrid, which was named Asplenium × trudellii in his honor by Wherry in 1925. Trudell's accounting skills allowed him to fill the post of treasurer to the Philadelphia Botanical Club from 1947 to 1960, and he was also a member of the American Fern Society.

== Death ==
Trudell developed Parkinson's disease at age 80, and died in Abington in 1964. His plant and mineral collections were dispersed among the Philadelphia Academy of Natural Sciences, the Franklin and Marshall Natural History Museum, the Smithsonian, and the Philadelphia College of Pharmacy and Science.

== Bibliography ==
- Blaszczyk, Regina Lee (2009). Rohm and Haas: a century of innovation. University of Pennsylvania Press. ISBN 9780812241891.
- Gordon, Samuel (1926). "Penroseite and Trudellite: two new minerals". Proceedings of the Academy of Natural Sciences of Philadelphia. 77: 317–324.
- Hill, Edwin Charles (1919). The Historical Register. New York: E.C. Hill.
- Wilson, Wendell E. (2012). "Harry W. Trudell". Mineralogical Record Biographical Archive. The Mineralogical Record.
- Wherry, Edgar T. (1925). "The Appalachian Aspleniums". American Fern Journal. 15 (2): 48–54. doi:10.2307/1544001. JSTOR 1544001.
- Wherry, Edgar T. (1964). "Notes and News". American Fern Journal. 54 (3): 152–154. JSTOR 1546130.
- Wherry, Edgar T. (1964b). "Harry W. Trudell". Bartonia. 34: 1–2.
