= Nuncia María Tur =

Argentinian botanist (1940–1979)

Nuncia María Tur (born 1940) is an Argentine botanist. She is a researcher in the Vascular Plants Division, Faculty of Natural Sciences, the National University of La Plata. Her work has focused on aquatic plant species, and specializes in Podostemaceae.

The standard author abbreviation Tur is used to indicate this person as the author when citing a botanical name.

== Selected works ==
- 1997. Taxonomy of Podostemaceae in Argentina. Aquatic Bot. 57: 213-241

== Bibliography ==
- Lahitte, Héctor Blas; Hurrell, Julio Alberto (1997). Plantas de la costa: las plantas nativas y naturalizadas más comunes de las costas del Delta del Paraná, Isla Martín García y Ribera Platense. L.O.L.A. ISBN 978-950-9725-25-6.
