= Thomas Taylor (microscopist) =

Scottish-American microscopist and botanist (1820–1910)

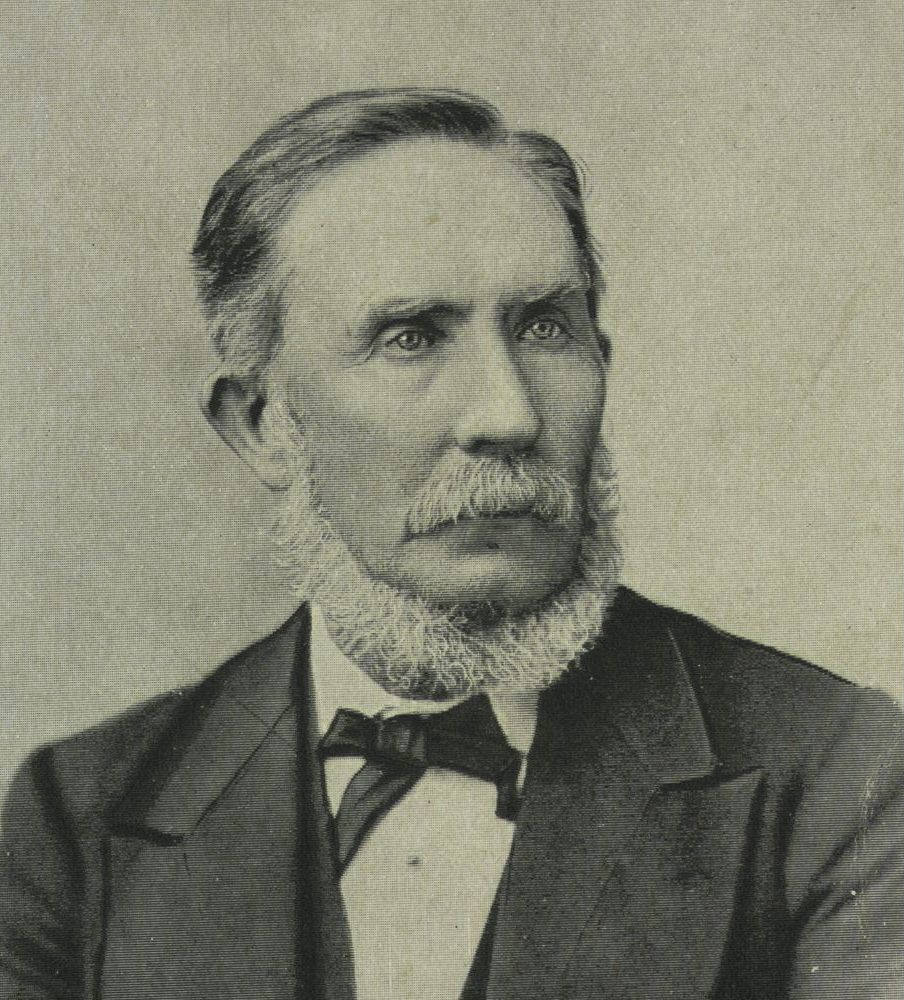
- Born: 1820; Perthshire
- Died: 1910 (aged 89–90)
- Occupation: Microscopist, phytopathologist
- Employer: United States Department of Agriculture

Thomas Taylor (1820–1910) was a Scottish-American plant pathologist and microscopist. He was among the first to publish works on microscopic plant pathology with the USDA.

Taylor was born in Perthshire, Scotland. He immigrated to the United States at the invitation of Abraham Lincoln in 1851. In 1871, he was hired by the USDA and became head of microscopy. He was often criticized for his lack of professional training, and his work was discredited and buried by his colleagues. However, his research into fungal diseases of fruit was later praised.

Taylor died in 1910.
