= Joseph Victor Viviand-Morel =

Joseph Victor Viviand-Morel (1843, born near Lons-le-Saunier – 28 December 1915, Lyon) was a French horticulturist and gardener.

Trained as a gardener, in 1864, he became a deputy-chief at the Parc de la Tête d'Or in Lyon. For a number of years in Lyon, he collaborated with botanist Alexis Jordan (1814–1897), with whom he cultivated many varieties of plants. From 1882 to 1915, he was editor-in-chief of the journal Lyon Horticole.

In 1872, he was a founding member of the Société botanique de Lyon, serving as its president on five occasions. He also served as secretary general of the Association horticole lyonnaise (1879) and was a member of the Société botanique de France.

== Published works ==
- Production et mérite des hybrides, 1893.
- Les oeillets remontants : histoire et culture, 1895.
- Instructions sur la culture des chrysanthèmes a la grande fleur, 1896.
- La culture des chrysanthèmes : à la grande fleur, 1903.
