= Marc Antoine Timeroy =

Marc Antoine Timeroy (22 August 1793, La Frette, Isère – 13 November 1856, Lyon) was a French botanist.

A bookkeeper by trade, he was educated in botany by a Lyon pharmacist named Thevenin. Timeroy is remembered for his intensive investigations of flora in the vicinity of Lyon.

From 1846 until his death he was a member of the Société linnéenne de Lyon, from which he served as a botanical curator in 1852–55. From 1849 to 1855 he was a member of the Société d'agriculture de Lyon. After his death, his biography was composed by Étienne Mulsant ("Notice sur Marc-Antoine Timeroy", F. Dumoulin 1859).

In 1860 the genus Timeroyea (syn: Pisonia) was named after him by Jean Xavier Hyacinthe Montrouzier. Also, plants with the specific epithet of timeroyi are named in his honor, an example being Galium timeroyi.
