= Pierre Alfred Déséglise =

French botanist

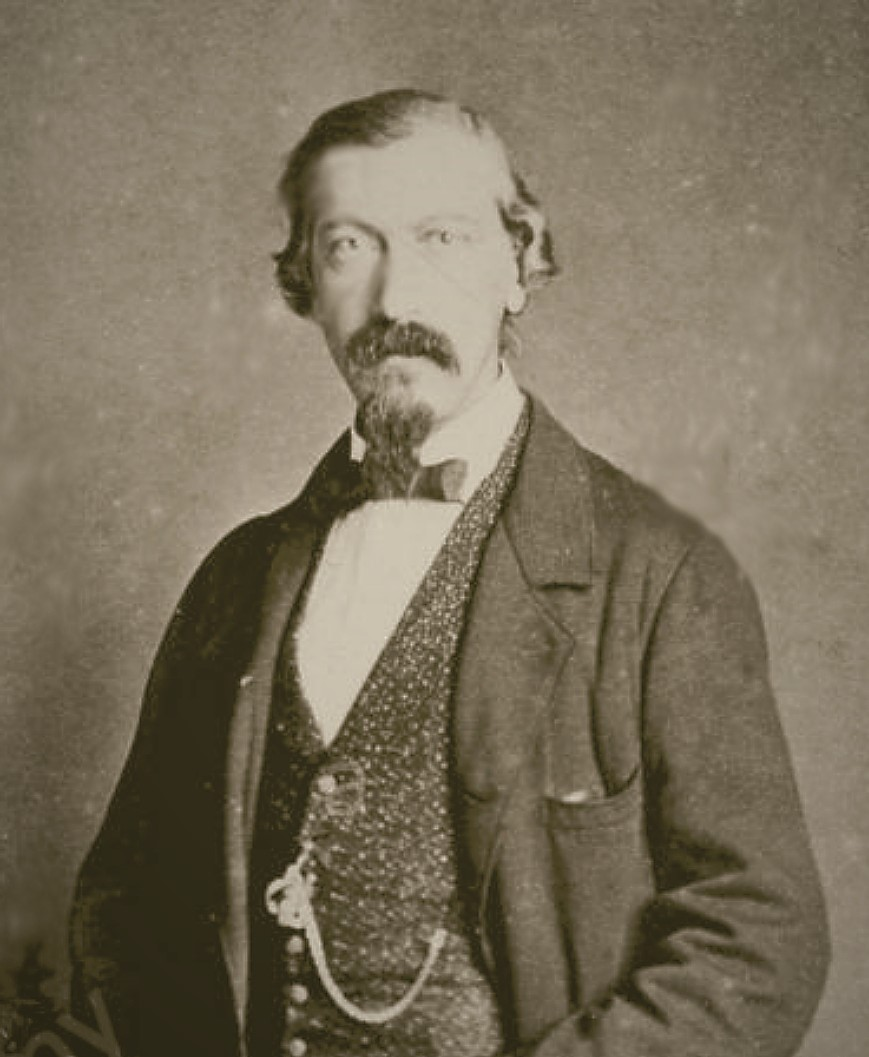
Pierre Alfred Déséglise

Pierre Alfred Déséglise (28 October 1823, Bourges – 13 December 1883, Geneva) was a French botanist.

He was a student of Alexandre Boreau (1803–1875), with whom he botanized and collected plants in the department of Cher and surrounding areas. In the midst of hardship in 1871, he relocated to Geneva, where in 1874 he began work as an assistant curator at the Conservatoire Botanique. At the time of his death, his collection of roses were sent to the herbarium at the Royal Botanical Gardens at Kew.

In his botanical studies, he focused on plants from the genera Rosa, Mentha and Thymus. He was the author of the following works:

- Descriptions de quelques espèces nouvelles du genre Rosa; Extrait du Billotia. (1864) – Descriptions of some new species from the genus Rosa.
- Catalogue raisonnè ou Énumèration mèthodique des espèces du genre rosier pour l'Europe, l'Asie et l'Afrique, spècialement les rosiers de la France et de L'Angleterre; Genève, Mentz, (1877) – Catalogue raisonné; methodical enumeration of species from the genus Rosa found in Europe, Asia and Africa, especially roses of France and England.

He issued the exsiccata-like series Herbarium Rosarum.
