= Bernard Dell =

Australian botanist

Bernard Dell (born 1949) is an Australian botanist. He is a Professor Emeritus at Murdoch University, a Professor Emeritus in the Vietnamese Academy of Forest Sciences and is a Visiting Professor in the Chinese Academy of Forestry. Before retiring he was a Research Director at Murdoch University developing strategic research partnerships with China and nearby countries. His research spans the disciplines of agriculture and forestry. He is the author of books and academic papers on these subjects and is the recipient of a Murdoch University Excellence in Research Award (2012), the China Friendship Award (2014), the Chiang Mai University Award (2015), The International Science and Technology Cooperation Award Chinese Academy of Forestry (2018) and Murdoch University Senate Medal (2020).
