= Armand Thielens =

Belgian naturalist

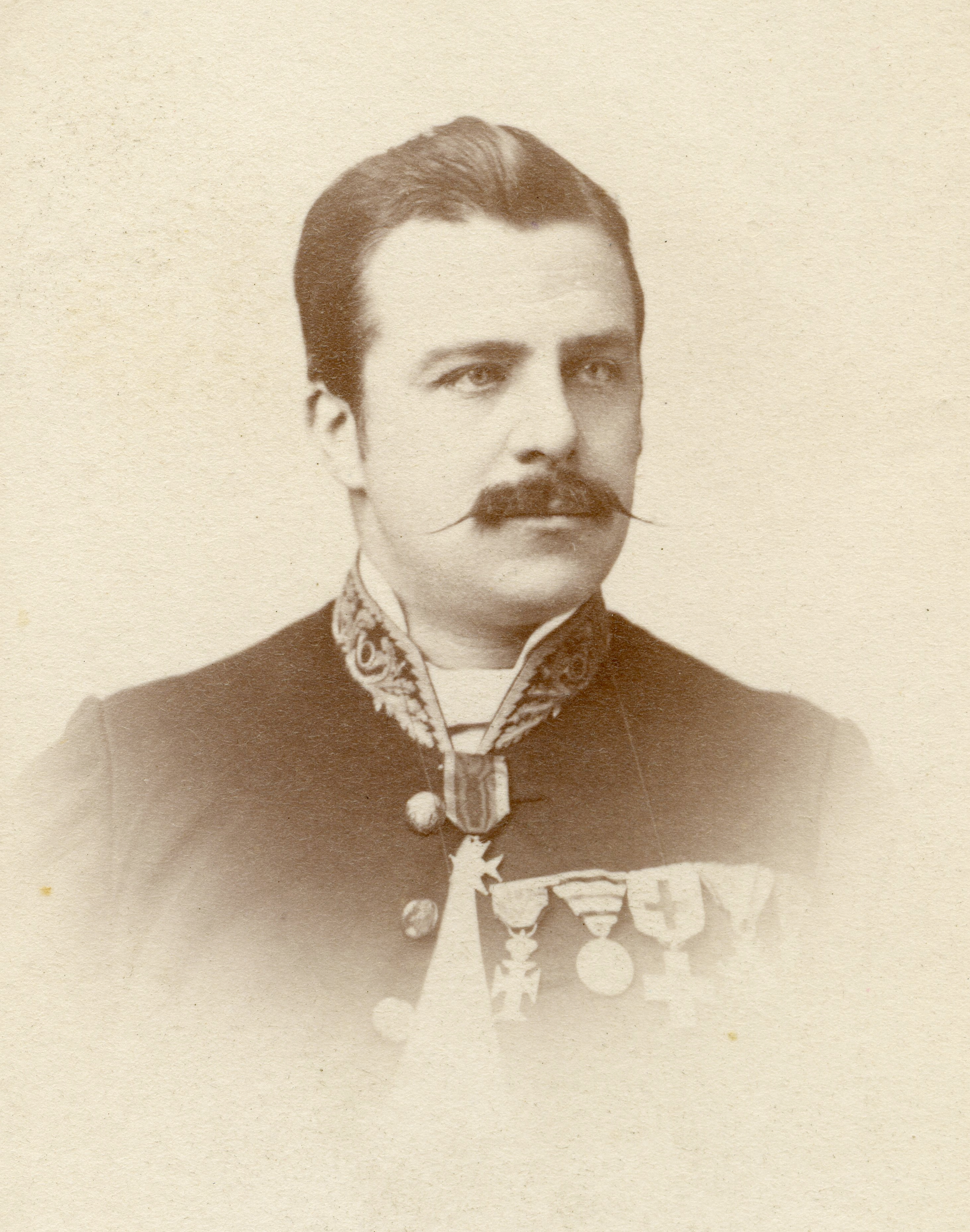
Carte-de-visite portrait

Armand Thielens (2 September 1833 – 3 January 1878) was a Belgian naturalist who contributed to paleontology, botany and entomology. He was a collector and a founding member of the Royal Botanical Society of Belgium.

Thielens was born in Jodoigne, the son of a postmaster in Tienen (Tirlemont). He studied the natural sciences and the only book he wrote was on the Belgian plants of medical importance which was dedicated to C. Guillery, Professor at the Museum and the Royal Athenaeum of Brussels. He manufactured vinegar in his home town. He explored the Campine region and travelled widely in Europe including to Italy and Luxemborg on collecting trips. His herbarium collections went to the State Botanical Garden and a collection of bird specimens went to a private collector. He also had a collection of fossils. He collaborated with André De Vos on plants and was a founding member of the Royal Botanical Society of Belgium. Together with De Vos he edited and distributed the exsiccata Kickxia belgica ou herbier des plantes les plus rares de la Belgique (1865-1869). He was also a member of the Malacological Society and examined the collections of Marianna Paulucci, who invited him during his attendance at the Congresso internazionale di Botanica e dell’Esposizione internazionale di Orticoltura in 1874. He praised the organization of the collection. He married Palmyre Janssens in Tienen where he also built a personal natural history museum. He moved out of Tienen to Saint-Josse in 1876. He died in Paris. A fungus, Sphaeria thielensii was named in his honour.
