= Thomas Williams (manufacturer) =

New Zealand ironfounder (born 1846)

Thomas Albert Williams (born 2 February 1846, date of death unknown) was an ironfounder, businessman and Christchurch City and Gore Borough Councillor in the South Island of New Zealand.

Williams' father was John Williams, a smith and iron founder in London. Williams Jr. established an engineering business in Christchurch, New Zealand, in 1864, aged only 18. By 1871, he was employing 18 men. The workshop was located at the intersection of Oxford Terrace and Montreal Street. At some point, he expanded his workshop by buying an adjoining section that faced Tuam Street. He made New Zealand flax machinery and kitchen ranges, of which he sold 150 in two years. His foundry could produce castings up to 16 cwt (730 kg). Williams supplied the New Zealand Railways with a steam crane for £600; this was the first of this kind to be made in New Zealand. In 1874, Williams supplied the engine for a steam punt that was put into service on Lake Ellesmere / Te Waihora. In September 1874, he was bankrupted, with the auctioneer Charles Clark tasked with selling his possessions. Owing rent, some of his remaining possessions, including some poultry, were auctioned in December 1876 by auctioneer Herbert Alport.

Thomas Williams was elected to the Christchurch City Council in a by-election on 16 October 1872. When his term came to an end, he was one of eight candidates who stood for re-election to three positions. He came seventh in the election and was unsuccessful, defeated by Fred Hobbs, Samuel Farr, and Thomas D. Jones. This was Williams' only term on the city council.

Williams was a poultry and pigeon enthusiast, and particularly known for his pigeons. In August 1868, he was a judge at the inaugural Christchurch poultry show. At the 1869 poultry show, he won a prize for his pigeons. By the mid-1870s, work demands prevented him from spending much time on this hobby.

On 24 March 1870, Williams married Mary Hopwood at the Church of St Michael and All Angels. Henry Jacobs officiated as dean of Christchurch. They would have one son and one daughter. A son, Henry Williams, continued the poultry interest and invented the Kapai incubator.

In September 1887, Williams was elected to the Gore Borough Council.
