= William Tricker =

Charles William Brett Tricker (1852–1916) was an English-born estate gardener. He trained at Kew Gardens in London, before emigrating to the United States in the later 19th century. His interest was in aquatic plants, and he began a company, named William Tricker, that specialized in aquatic plants. The company sent out its first mail order catalog in 1892, and is still operating, as William Tricker, Inc. based in Independence, Ohio. The company currently displays Tricker's original catalog. Being a plantsman, he wrote many articles for the publication Garden and Forest in the 1890s dealing with aquatic plants. He is well known for producing many hybrid water lilies that are still known around the world. He introduced a water lily with 6-feet pads from South America, which he named Victoria trickeri, although it is now known as Victoria cruziana. He died in 1916, after which his son, Charles Tricker, took over the business.
