= K.S. Varaprasad =

Indian botanist

K.S.Varaprasad
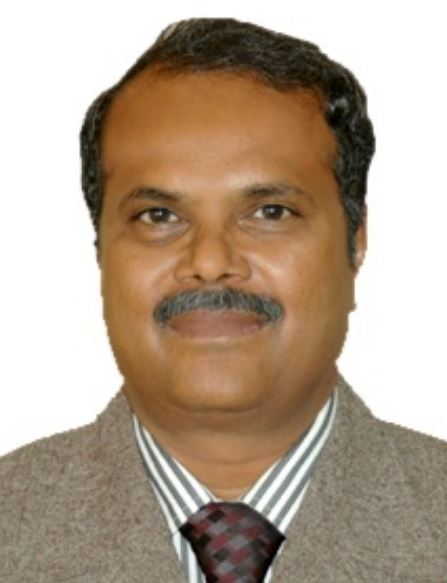
- Born: 1 July 1954 (age 72); Krishna District, Andhra Pradesh, India
- Occupations: Sr. Consultant, Retired Director, Indian Institute of Oilseeds Research; Agricultural Scientist; Nematologist
- Years active: Since 1979
- Awards: Late Sri P.P. Singhal Memorial Award, 2015; Dodla Raghava Reddy Memorial Award for outstanding contribution in plant protection Dr K L Mehra Memorial Award
- Website: http://www.icar-iior.org.in/

Kodeboyina Sivannarayana Varaprasad is an Indian agricultural scientist, Nematologist and the Director of Indian Institute of Oilseeds Research (Formerly Directorate of Oilseeds Research, DOR), Rajendranagar, Hyderabad. He was former Head of NBPGR, Regional Station at Hyderabad for about a period of 26 years. and was associated in the development of 11 genetic stocks in tomato, linseed, jatropha, cowpea, chilli and sorghum. Dr.K.S.Varaprasad is recipient of Late Sri P.P. Singhal Memorial Award, 2015.

== Biography ==
K S Varaprasad was born on 1 July 1954 in Krishna District of Andhra Pradesh. Having completed the master's degree and Doctorate in Nematology from Indian Agricultural Research Institute, New Delhi, served the same Institute as Scientist for a period of six years and then moved to National Bureau of Plant Genetic Resources (NBPGR), Regional Station, Hyderabad as Senior Scientist and served for a period of 12 years. During this period he contributed in the areas of collection, evaluation, conservation and utilization of plant genetic resources as Head, NBPGR Regional Station, Hyderabad for about 26 years and associated in the registration of 11 genetic stocks in tomato, linseed, Jatropha, cowpea, chilli and sorghum; developed world-class laboratories, experimental farm and a quarantine greenhouse complex by acquiring a barren and partly abandoned mango orchard land in addition to six years teaching experience at IARI, New Delhi.,.

Presently, as the Director of Indian Institute of Oilseeds Research, Facilitated production of nucleus seed of parental lines castor and sunflower hybrids and initiated production of farmer participatory hybrid seed production in large scale. Exchange of over 0.8 million seed accessions facilitated by conducting seed health tests and implement global protocols serving 48 organisations including ICRISAT, private industry and public institutions as designated Phytosanitory Authority representing Government of India during 1986-2011. Conducted seed research and published several research papers in the fields of quarantine, seed pathology, seed behaviour and conservation.

Facilitated to receive over Rs. 777.89 lakhs to IIOR from the external funding agencies; initiated the establishment of multi-disciplinary network programme. through taskforce to address the serious research issues of mandated crops of IIOR; organised several national, international seminars / conferences / symposia, training programmes, brainstorming sessions, kisan melas, winter/summer schools and refresher courses. Effectively implemented the Tribal-Sub-Plan with an amount of Rs. 268.70 lakhs in about 192 villages of 15 districts spread over in seven states to benefit 2546 farmers in the last three years. Presently looking after the planning, coordination, evaluation and monitoring of the research work on oilseeds at national level spread across all the states through 64 AICRP centres working on sunflower, safflower, castor, sesame, nyjer and linseed.

Facilitated collection, evaluation and conservation of germplasm of agricultural crops and horticultural crops viz., Castor, Sunflower, Linseed, other cereals and pulses, Pongamia, Jatropha and other vegetable crops from South East Coastal India. Dr.Prasad has collected 225 accessions of Jatropha and 193 accessions of Pongamia and shared with 3 organizations (CRIDA, ICRISAT, ANGRAU). Eighty plus trees of Pongamia identified and shared with forestry department for planting material. Also Facilitated production of nucleus seed of parental lines castor and sunflower hybrids. Encouraged production of farmer participatory hybrid seed production in castor to the tune of 200 quintals. Facilitated import and evaluation of 40 Mexican varieties of safflower with high seed oil content. Diverse sunflower hybrid parental lines with high oil and high seed yield and high oleic content were identified and imported from Serbia.

Prasad is serving as the President for two scientific societies viz., Indian Society of Oilseeds Research and Plant Protection Association of India. Organised two international conferences on safflower and plant health management in which representatives from 10 countries have participated. These conferences have helped for the inflow of germplasm/exotic material to India and also to establish international linkages in the field of agriculture. Served as member of AP Biodiversity Board. Presently serving as RAC Member of CSGRC, Hosur and as Member of Board of Management, UAS, Raichur contributed for the development and formulation of academic policies and research strategies

The standard author abbreviation Varapr. is used to indicate this person as the author when citing a botanical name.

== Awards and honours ==
Dr.K.S.Varaprasad is recipient of Late Sri P.P. Singhal Memorial Award, 2015, Dodla Raghava Reddy Memorial Gold Medal Awardfor his outstanding contribution in plant protection, Dr K.L. Mehra Memorial Award, Talented Scientist Award and Prof. D.J. Raski Merit Award; guided four M.Sc./Ph.D. Students; visited Canada, Syria, United States of America, United Kingdom and Australia on different assignments and to deliver lead/invited lectures. He was felicitated by Honorable Chief Minister of Andhra Pradesh AP State Biodiversity Board[2]. He is Fellow of Indian Society of Plant Genetic Resources, and President, Plant Protection Association of India . He was an Expert member - International Consultation on Globally Important Agricultural Heritage Systems, Zonal Coordinator- FAO project (Recognition), Department of Agriculture and Cooperation, New Delhi, Chief Editor,- Indian Journal of Plant Protection, (Recognition), Plant Protection Association of India Hyderabad, Member of Institute Management Committee - National Research Centre on Sorghum, Hyderabad, Directorate of Oilseeds Research, Hyderabad and National Bureau of Plant Genetic Resources, New Delhi. He is also a member, Andhra Pradesh State Biodiversity Board, Ministry of Environment and Forestry, Hyderabad, National Organising Committee, Indian Science Congress, ANGRAU, Hyderabad.

Authored and edited seven books[4] and 134 research papers[9] including book chapters and technical bulletins in the fields of Plant Genetic Resources and oilseeds research were published in national and international reputed journals.

== See also ==
- Acharya N. G. Ranga Agricultural University
- Indian Council of Agricultural Research
