= Johan van Scheepen =

Dutch botanist

- Education: Leiden University
- Scientific career
- Fields: Botany
- Workplaces: Koninklijke Algemeene Vereniging voor Bloembollencultuur
- Author abbrev. (botany): Van Scheepen

Johan van Scheepen is a Dutch botanist.

== Career ==
Educated at Leiden University, Van Scheepen has worked at the University of Reading as a research fellow (1982-1985) and the Ministerie van Landbouw en Visserij (1985-1988). Since 1989 he has been a taxonomist and registrar for the ICRA (International Cultivar Registration Authorities) at KAVB (Royal General Bulbgrowers Association) in the Netherlands.
