= List of botanists by author abbreviation (G) =

This is an incomplete list of botanists by their author abbreviation, which is designed for citation with the botanical names or works that they have published. This list follows that established by Brummitt & Powell (1992). Use of that list is recommended by Rec. 46A Note 1 of the International Code of Nomenclature for algae, fungi, and plants. The list is kept up to date online at The International Plant Names Index and Index Fungorum.

In some cases an "author abbreviation" consists of a full surname, while in other cases the surname is abbreviated and/or accompanied by one or more initials. There is no space between the initials and the surname (or its abbreviation).

==== Order of entries ====
The list here is maintained strictly in order of the alphabetic characters in the abbreviation; thus "A.B.Jacks." appears under "A" not "J", and is located as if the characters were "ABJACKS". Capitalization is ignored as are all non-alphabetic characters such as "." and space. Diacritical marks are also ignored, so that, e.g., "ü" is treated as if it were "u".

==== Navigation ====
Because of its length, the list is split across separate pages. All alphabetic sections can be accessed from the short table of contents; the vertical bars show the page divisions. Searching will only find an entry within a page.

== A–F ==
Contents:	A	B	C	D	E F	G	H	I J	K L	M	N O	P	Q R	S	T U V	W X Y Z

To find entries for A–F, use the table of contents above.

== G ==
Contents: Top	A	B	C	D	E F	G	H	I J	K L	M	N O	P	Q R	S	T U V	W X Y Z

- G.A.Allen – Geraldine A. Allen (born 1950)
- G.A.Black – George Alexander Black (1916–1957)
- Gaertn. – Joseph Gaertner (1732–1791)
- G.A.Fryxell – Greta Albrecht Fryxell (1926–2017)
- Gage – Andrew Thomas Gage (1871–1945)
- Gagnebin – Abraham Gagnebin (1707–1800)
- Gagnep. – François Gagnepain (1866–1952)
- Gaill. – Charles Gaillardot (1814–1883)
- Gaillard – Albert Gaillard (1858–1903)
- Gaimard – Joseph Paul Gaimard (1790–1858)
- G.A.Klebs – Georg Albrecht Klebs (1857–1918)
- Galasso – Gabriele Galasso (born 1967)
- Galbany – Mercè Galbany-Casals (fl. 2004), also as "Mercè Galbany"
- Gale – Shirley Gale Cross (1915–2008)
- Galeano – Gloria A. Galeano (1958–2016)
- Galeotti – Henri Guillaume Galeotti (1814–1858)
- Gallesio – Giorgio Gallesio (1772–1839)
- Galpin – Ernest Edward Galpin (1858–1941)
- Galushko – Anatol I. Galushko (born 1926)
- Gamajun. – Aleksandra Pavlovna Gamajunova (1904–1971)
- Gamble – James Sykes Gamble (1847–1925)
- Gams – Helmut Gams (1893–1976)
- G.A.M.Scott – George Anderson Macdonald Scott (1933–1998)
- Gand. – Michel Gandoger (1850–1926)
- Gandhi – Kancheepuram Natarajan Gandhi (born 1948)
- G.A.Noble – Glenn Arthur Noble (1909–2001)
- G.A.Paterson – Grant A. Paterson (fl. 2011)
- Garay – Leslie Andrew Garay (1924–2016)
- Garbari – Fabio Garbari (born 1937)
- Garber – Abram Paschal Garber (1838–1881)
- García-Barr. – Hernando García-Barriga (1913–2005)
- Garcin – Laurent Garcin (1683–1752)
- Garcke – Christian August Friedrich Garcke (1819–1904)
- Garden – Alexander Garden (1730–1792)
- Gardiner – William Gardiner (1808–1852)
- Gardner – George Gardner (1812–1849)
- Gariod – Charles Henri Gariod (1836–1892)
- Garn.-Jones – Philip John Garnock-Jones (born 1950)
- Garnet – John Roslyn Garnet (1906–1998)
- Garsault – François Alexandre Pierre de Garsault (1691–1778)
- Gasp. – Guglielmo Gasparrini (1803–1866)
- Gatt. – Augustin Gattinger (1825–1903)
- Gattef. – Jean Gattefossé (1899–1960)
- Gatty – Margaret Scott Gatty (1809–1873)
- Gauba – Erwin Gauba (1891-1964)
- Gaudin – Jean François Aimée Gottlieb Philippe Gaudin (1766–1833)
- Gaudich. – Charles Gaudichaud-Beaupré (1789–1854)
- Gäum. – Ernst Albert Gäumann (1893–1963)
- Gaussen – Henri Marcel Gaussen (1891–1981)
- Gaut. – Marie Clément Gaston Gautier (1841–1911)
- G.A.Wallace – G. Ansley Wallace (fl. 1979)
- G.A.Wheeler – Gerald A. Wheeler (born 1940)
- Gay – Claude Gay (1800–1873)
- Gáyer – Gyula Gáyer (1883–1932)
- G.Bertol. – Giuseppe Bertoloni (1804–1879)
- G.Bosc – Georges Bosc (1918–2000)
- G.B.Popov – George Basil Popov (fl. 1957)
- G.Brockman – Garry Brockman (born 1954)
- G.Chandler – Gregory T. Chandler (born 1972)
- G.Clifford – George Clifford III (1685–1760)
- G.C.Munro – George Campbell Munro (1866–1963)
- G.C.S.Clarke – Giles C. S. Clarke (born 1944)
- G.C.Tucker – Gordon C. Tucker (born 1957)
- G.Cunn. – Gordon Herriott (Heriot) Cunningham (1892–1962)
- G.C.Wall. – George Charles Wallich (1815–1899)
- G.C.Whipple – George Chandler Whipple (1866–1924)
- G.Dahlgren – Gertrud Dahlgren (1931–2009)
- G.Dawson – Genoveva Dawson (1918–2012)
- G.D.Duncan – Graham D. Duncan (fl. 1993)
- G.Don – George Don (1798–1856)
- G.D.Rowley – Gordon Douglas Rowley (1921–2019)
- G.D.Wallace – Gary D. Wallace (born 1946)
- G.E.Baker – Gladys Elizabeth Baker (1908–2007)
- Gebert – Wayne Ashley Gebert (born 1976)
- Geerinck – Daniel Geerinck (born 1945)
- Geh. – Adalbert Geheeb (1842–1909)
- G.E.Haglund – Gustaf Emmanuel Haglund (1900–1955)
- Geiger – Philipp Lorenz Geiger (1785–1836)
- Geissler – Ursula Geissler (1931–2018)
- G.E.Lee – Gaik Ee Lee (born 1981)
- Gelert – Otto Christian Leonor Gelert (1862–1899)
- Gelting – Paul Emil Elliot Gelting (1905–1964)
- Gemeinholzer – Birgit Gemeinholzer (fl. 2006)
- Genev. – Léon Gaston Genevier (1830–1880)
- Gennari – Patrizio Gennari (1820–1897)
- Gensel – Patricia G. Gensel (born 1944)
- Gentil – Ambroise Gentil (1842–1929)
- Gentry – Howard Scott Gentry (1903–1993)
- Georgi – Johann Gottlieb Georgi (1729–1802)
- Gereau – Roy Emile Gereau (born 1947)
- Gérard – Louis Gérard (1733–1819)
- Geras. – I.I. Gerasimenko (born 1939)
- Gerhardt – Julius Gerhardt (1827–1912)
- Gerrienne – Phillipe Gerrienne (fl. 2010)
- Gerstb. – Pedro Gerstberger (born 1951)
- Gerstner – Jacob Gerstner (1888–1948)
- Gerth – Hugo Leonardus Gerth van Wijk (1849–1921)
- G.E.Schatz – George Edward Schatz (born 1953)
- G.E.Sm. – Gerard Edwards Smith (1804–1881)
- Gesner – Conrad Gessner (1516–1565)
- Getachew – Getachew Aweke (born 1937)
- Geyer – Karl Andreas Geyer (1809–1853)
- Geyl. – Hermann Theodor Geyler (1834–1889)
- G.F.Atk. – George Francis Atkinson (1854–1918)
- G.F.Craig – Gillian F. Craig (fl. 2007)
- G.Fisch. – Georg Fischer (1844–1941)
- G.Fisch.Waldh. – Gotthelf Fischer von Waldheim (1771–1853)
- G.Forst. – Georg Forster (1754–1794)
- G.F.Walsh – Gerry F. Walsh (fl. 1993)
- G.Gaertn. – Gottfried Gaertner (1754–1825) (sometimes as Philipp Gottfried Gaertner)
- G.G.Niles – Grace Greylock Niles (fl. 1904)
- G.Haller – Gottlieb Emmanuel von Haller (1735–1786) (a son of Albrecht von Haller)
- Ghaz. – Shahina Agha Ghazanfar (born 1949)
- G.Hend. – George Henderson (1836–1929)
- G.Hensl. – George Henslow (1835–1925)
- Ghesq. – Jean Hector Paul Auguste Ghesquière (1888–1982)
- Ghini – Luca Ghini (1490–1556)
- G.H.Martin – George Hamilton Martin (born 1887)
- G.H.M.Lawr. – George Hill Mathewson Lawrence (1910–1978)
- G.H.Morton – Gary H. Morton (fl. 1974)
- G.Holmes – Glenn Holmes (fl. 1999)
- G.H.S.Wood – Geoffrey H.S. Wood (1927–1957)
- G.H.Tate – George Henry Hamilton Tate (1894–1953)
- G.H.Wagner – Georg Heinrich Wagner (1859–1903)
- G.H.Zhu – Guang Hua Zhu (1964–2005)
- G.I.Baird – Gary Innes Baird (born 1955)
- Gibbs – Lilian Gibbs (1870–1925)
- Gibby – Mary Gibby (1949–2024)
- Gibelli – Giuseppe Gibelli (1831–1898)
- Giesecke – Karl Ludwig (Sir Charles Lewis) Giesecke (1761–1833) (aka Johann Georg Metzler)
- Giess – Johan Wilhelm Heinrich Giess (1910–2000)
- Gilb. – Robert Lee Gilbertson (1925–2011)
- Gilding – Edward Gilding ((fl. 2001)
- Gilg – Ernest Friedrich Gilg (1867–1933)
- Gilg-Ben. – Charlotte Gilg-Benedict (1872–1936)
- Gilib. – Jean-Emmanuel Gilibert (1741–1814)
- Gilland. – Ken Gillanders (fl. 2008)
- Gillek. – Léopold Guillaume Gillekens (1833–1905)
- Gillespie – John Wynn Gillespie (1901–1932)
- Gillham – C.M. Gillham (fl. 1980)
- Gilli – Alexander Gilli (1904–2007)
- Gillies – John Gillies (1792–1834)
- Gilliland – Hamish Boyd Gilliland (1911–1965)
- Gillis – William Thomas Gillis (1933–1979)
- Gilly – Charles Louis Gilly (1911–1970)
- Gilmour – John Scott Lennox Gilmour (1906–1986)
- Ging. – Frédéric Charles Jean Gingins de la Sarraz (1790–1863)
- Gir.-Chantr. – Justin Girod-Chantrans (1750–1841)
- Girg. – Gustav Karl Girgensohn (1786–1872)
- Gironella – Elizabeth P. Gironella
- Giseke – Paul Dietrich Giseke (1741–1796)
- Giul. – Ana Maria Giulietti (born 1945)
- Givnish – Thomas J. Givnish (born 1951)
- Gjaerev. – Olav Gjærevoll (1916–1994)
- G.J.Atkins – Graeme J. Atkins (fl. 2023)
- G.J.Harden – Gwenneth J. Harden (born 1940)
- G.J.Howell – G.J. Howell (fl. 1996)
- G.J.Jordan – Gregory J. Jordan (fl. 2000)
- G.J.Leach – Gregory John Leach (born 1952)
- G.J.Lewis – Gwendoline Joyce Lewis (1909–1967)
- G.J.Sheph. – George John Shepherd (born 1949)
- G.Kadereit – Gudrun Kadereit (born 1969), see also her maiden name abbreviation Clausing
- G.Kirchn. – Georg Kirchner (1837–1885)
- G.Koch – Georg Friedrich Koch (1809–1874)
- G.Kunkel – Günther W.H. Kunkel (1928–2007)
- Glassman – Sidney Frederick Glassman (1919-2008)
- Glatf. – Noah Miller Glatfelter (1837–1911)
- G.Lawson – George Lawson (1827–1895)
- Glaz. – Auguste François Marie Glaziou (1828–1906)
- G.L.Chu – Ge Lin Chu (born 1934)
- G.L.Church – George Lyle Church (1903–2003)
- G.L.Davis – Gwenda Louise Davis (1911–1993)
- Gleason – Henry Allan Gleason (1882–1975)
- Gledhill – David Gledhill (born 1929)
- Glehn – Peter von Glehn (1835–1876)
- Glejdura – Stanislav Glejdura (fl. 2015)
- G.Ll.Lucas – Grenville Llewellyn Lucas (1935–2022)
- G.L.Nesom – Guy L. Nesom (born 1945)
- G.Lodd. – George Loddiges (1784–1846)
- G.López – Ginés Alejandro López González (born 1950)
- Glover – James Glover (1844–1925)
- Gloxin – Benjamin Peter Gloxin (1765–1794)
- G.L.Rob. – George Leslie Robinson (born 1959)
- G.L.Webster – Grady Linder Webster (1927–2005)
- G.Mans. – Guilhem Mansion (born 1968)
- G.Martens – Georg Matthias von Martens (1788–1872)
- G.Martin – George Martin (1827–1886)
- G.M.Barroso – Graziela Maciel Barroso (1912–2003)
- G.Mey. – Georg Friedrich Wilhelm Meyer (1782–1856)
- G.M.Levin – Gregory Moiseyevich Levin (fl. 1980)
- G.Moore – George Thomas Moore (1871–1956)
- G.M.Plunkett – Gregory M. Plunkett (born 1965)
- G.M.Sm. – Gilbert Morgan Smith (1885–1959)
- G.Murray – George Robert Milne Murray (1858–1911)
- G.M.Waterh. – Grace Marion Waterhouse (1906–1996)
- G.N.Backh. – Gary N. Backhouse (born 1956)
- G.N.Collins – Guy N. Collins (1872–1938)
- G.Nicholson – George Nicholson (1847–1908)
- G.N.Jones – George Neville Jones (1903–1970)
- G.Norman – George Norman (1824–1882)
- Goadby – Bede Theodoric Goadby (1863–1944)
- Gobi – Christoph Jakosolewitsch Gobi (1847–1919)
- Godfery – Masters John Godfery (1856–1945)
- God.-Leb. – Alexandre Godefroy-Lebeuf (1852–1903)
- Godm. – Frederick DuCane Godman (1834–1919)
- Godr. – Dominique Alexandre Godron (1807–1880)
- Goebel – Karl Christian Traugott Friedemann Goebel (1794–1851)
- Goeldi – Émil August Goeldi (variations: Göldi, Emílio Augusto Goeldi) (1859–1917)
- Goering – Philip Friedrich Wilhelm Goering (1809–1876)
- Goeschke – Franz Goeschke (1844–1912)
- Gokusing – Linus Gokusing (fl. 2014)
- Goldberg – Aaron Goldberg (1917–2014)
- Goldblatt – Peter Goldblatt (born 1943)
- Goldfuss – Georg August Goldfuss (1782–1848)
- Goldie – John Goldie (1793–1886)
- Goldman – Edward Alphonso Goldman (born as Goltman) (1873–1946)
- Goldring – William Goldring (1854–1919)
- Gomb. – René Gombault (1871–1971)
- Gomes – Bernardino António Gomes (1769–1823)
- Gómez-Campo – César Gómez-Campo (1933–2009)
- Gómez Pompa – Arturo Gómez Pompa (born 1934)
- Gomont – Maurice Augustin Gomont (1839–1909)
- Gonez – Paul Gonez (fl. 2010)
- Goodd. – Leslie Newton Goodding (1880–1967)
- Gooden. – Samuel Goodenough (1743–1827)
- Goodsp. – Thomas Harper Goodspeed (1887–1966)
- Goodyer – John Goodyer (1592–1664)
- Gopalan – Rangasamy Gopalan (born 1947)
- Göpp. – Johann Heinrich Robert Göppert (1800–1884)
- Gordon – George Gordon (1806–1879)
- Gorovoj – Petr G. Gorovoj (born 1936)
- Gorozh. – Ivan Nikolaevich Gorozhankin (1848–1904)
- Gossw. – John Gossweiler (1873–1952)
- Gothan – Walther Ulrich Eduard Friedrich Gothan (1879–1954)
- Gottlieb – Leslie David Gottlieb (1936–2012)
- Gottsche – Carl Moritz Gottsche (1808–1892)
- Gottschl. – Günter Gottschlich (born 1951)
- Gouan – Antoine Gouan (1733–1821)
- Goudot – Justin Goudot (fl. 1822–1845)
- Gould – Frank Walton Gould (1913–1981)
- Gourret – Paul Gabriel Marie Gourret (1859–1903)
- Govaerts – Rafaël Herman Anna Govaerts (born 1968)
- Gowen – James Robert Gowen (1784–1862)
- Goy – Doris Alma Goy (1912–1999)
- G.P.Baker – George Percival Baker (1856–1951)
- G.Pearson – Gilbert Pearson
- G.Perkins – George Henry Perkins (1844–1933)
- G.Perry – Gillian Perry (1943–2011)
- G.Petersen – Gitte Petersen (born 1963)
- G.Planch. – (François) Gustav Planchon (1833–1900)
- G.P.Lewis – Gwilym Peter Lewis (born 1952)
- Gradst. – Stephan Robbert Gradstein (born 1943)
- Graebn. – Karl Otto Robert Peter Paul Graebner (1871–1933)
- Graells – Mariano de la Paz Graells y de la Agüera (1809–1898)
- Graf – Siegmund Graf (1801–1838)
- Graham – Robert Graham (1786–1845)
- Grande – Loreto Grande (1878–1965)
- Granv. – Jean-Jacques de Granville (1943–2022)
- Gratel. – Jean Pierre A. Sylvestre de Grateloup (1782–1862)
- Grau – Jürke Grau (born 1937)
- Grauer – Sebastian Grauer (1758–1820)
- Gravely – Frederic Henry Gravely (1885–1965)
- Gray – Samuel Frederick Gray (1766–1828)
- Grecescu – Dimitrie Grecescu (1841–1910)
- Gredilla – Apolinar Federico Gredilla y Gauna (1859–1919)
- Greene – Edward Lee Greene (1843–1915)
- Greenm. – Jesse More Greenman (1867–1951)
- Greenway – Percy James Greenway (1897–1980)
- Greg. – Eliza Standerwick Gregory (1840–1932)
- Greimler – J. Greimler (fl. 1998)
- Gren. – Jean Charles Marie Grenier (1808–1875)
- G.Retz. – Magnus Gustaf (Gustav) Retzius (1842–1919)
- Greuter – Werner Rodolfo Greuter (born 1938)
- Grev. – Robert Kaye Greville (1794–1866)
- Grey-Wilson – Christopher Grey-Wilson (born 1944)
- G.R.Hend. – Gemma Robyn Henderson (born 1976)
- Grierson – Andrew John Charles Grierson (1929–1990)
- Grieve – Brian John Grieve (1907–1997)
- Griff. – William Griffith (1810–1845)
- Griffioen – K. Griffioen
- Griffiths – David Griffiths (1867–1935)
- Griggs – Robert Fiske Griggs (1881–1962)
- Grimm – Johann Friedrich Carl Grimm (1737–1821)
- Grimwade – Russell Grimwade (1879–1955)
- Grindel – David Hieronymus Grindel (1776–1836)
- Grindon – Leopold Hartley Grindon (1818–1904)
- Gris – Jean Antoine Arthur Gris (1829–1872)
- Griscom – Ludlow Griscom (1890–1959)
- Griseb. – August Heinrich Rudolf Grisebach (1814–1879)
- Groeninckx – Inge Groeninckx (fl. 2010)
- Groenland – Johannes Groenland (1824–1891)
- Grognier – Louis Furcy Grognier (1773–1837)
- Grognot – Camille Grognot (1792–1869)
- Grolle – Riclef Grolle (1934–2004)
- Gronov. – Johan Frederik (Johannes Fredericus, Jan Fredrik) Gronovius (1686–1762)
- Groot. – Herman Johannes Grootendorst (1911–1982)
- Groppo – Milton Groppo (fl. 2002)
- Grossh. – Alexander Alfonsovich Grossheim (1888–1948)
- G.Roth – Georg Roth (1842–1915)
- Grout – Abel Joel Grout (1867–1947)
- Grove – William Bywater Grove (1848–1938)
- Gr.Rossi – Graziano Rossi (born 1960)
- Grube – Martin Grube (fl. 1989)
- Grubov – Valery Ivanovitsch Grubov (1917–2009)
- Grudz. – Irina Aleksandrovna Grudzinskaya (1920–2012)
- Gruith. – Franz von Paula (Franciscus de Paula) Gruithuisen (1774–1852)
- Grulich – Vít Grulich (1956–2022)
- Grumm-Grzhim. – Grigory Grumm-Grzhimaylo (Grum-Grshimailo) (1860–1936)
- Grüning – Georg Grüning (1862-1926)
- Grushv. – Igor Vladimirovich Grushvitzky (1916–1991)
- G.Sancho – Gisela Sancho (fl. 1999)
- G.S.Bunting – George Sydney Bunting (1927–2015)
- G.Scheffler – Georg Scheffler (died 1910)
- G.Schellenb. – Gustav August Ludwig David Schellenberg (1882–1963)
- G.Schneid. – George Schneider (1848–1917)
- G.Schneid.bis – Georg Schneider (born 1888)
- G.S.Giri – Girija Sankar Giri (born 1950)
- G.Shaw – George Shaw (1751–1813)
- G.Simpson – George Simpson (1880–1952)
- G.Sinclair – George Sinclair (1786–1834)
- G.Singh – Gurcharan Singh (born 1945)
- G.S.Mill. – Gerrit Smith Miller Jr. (1869–1956)
- G.S.Rawat – Gopal Singh Rawat (fl. 2010)
- G.S.Ringius – Gordon Stacey Ringius (born 1949)
- G.Stev. – Greta Stevenson (1911–1990)
- G.S.West – George Stephen West (1876–1919)
- G.Taylor – George Taylor (1904–1993)
- G.T.Nisbet – Gladys T. Nisbet (1895–1994)
- G.Tobler – Gertrud Tobler (1877–1948)
- G.S.Torr. – George Safford Torrey (1891–1977)
- G.Trevir. – Gottfried Reinhold Treviranus (1776–1837) (older brother of Ludolph Christian Treviranus)
- G.T.S.Baylis – Geoffrey Thomas Sandford Baylis (1913–2003)
- G.T.Wright – Genevieve T. Wright (fl. 2018)
- Guadagno – Michele Guadagno (1878–1930)
- Gubanov – Ivan Alekseevich Gubanov (1933–2005)
- Gueldenst. – Johann Anton Güldenstädt (1745–1781)
- Guett. – Jean Étienne Guettard (1715–1786)
- Guiggi – Alessandro Guiggi (born 1973)
- Guignard – Jean-Louis-Léon Guignard (1852–1928)
- Guilding – Lansdown Guilding (1797–1831)
- Guilf. – William Robert Guilfoyle (1840–1912)
- Guill. – Jean Baptiste Antoine Guillemin (1796–1842)
- Guillaumin – André Guillaumin (1885–1974)
- Guimpel – Friedrich Guimpel (1774–1839)
- Guinea – Emilio Guinea López (1907–1985)
- Gumbl. – William Edward Gumbleton (1840–1911)
- Gunckel – Hugo Gunckel Lűer (1901–1997)
- Güner – Adil Güner (born 1950)
- Gunn – Ronald Campbell Gunn (1808–1881)
- Gunnerus – Johann Ernst Gunnerus (1718–1773)
- Gün.Schneid. – Günther Schneider (born 1904)
- Gürke – Robert Louis August Maximilian Gürke (1854–1911)
- Guss. – Giovanni Gussone (1787–1866)
- Gus.Schneid. – Gustav Schneider (1834–1900)
- Gust.Fisch. – Gustav Fischer (born 1889)
- Gușul. – Mihail Gușuleac (1887–1960)
- Guthrie – Francis Guthrie (1831–1899)
- Guttová – Anna Guttová (born 1972)
- Gutw. – Roman Gutwinski (1860–1932)
- Guymer – Gordon P. Guymer (born 1953)
- G.Vidal – Gustave Prosper Vidal (1835–1905)
- G.V.Pope – Gerald Vernon Pope (born 1941)
- G.Wall – George Wall (1820–1894)
- G.W.Andrews – George W. Andrews (born 1929)
- G.Watt – George Watt (1851–1930)
- G.W.Carr – Geoffrey William Carr (born 1948)
- G.W.Fisch. – George William Fischer (1906–1995)
- G.White – Gilbert White (1720–1793)
- G.W.Hu – Guang Wan Hu (fl. 2007)
- G.Wilh. – Gerould Wilhelm (born 1948)
- G.Winter – Heinrich Georg Winter (1848–1887)
- G.W.Martin – George Willard Martin (1886–1971)
- G.W.Rothwell – Gar W. Rothwell (born 1944)
- G.W.Schimp. – Georg Wilhelm Schimper (1804–1878)
- Gyeltshen – Nima Gyeltshen (fl. 2017)
- G.Zenker – Georg August Zenker (1855–1922)
- G.Zimm. – Gisbert Zimmermann (fl. 1978)

== H–Z ==
Contents: Top	A	B	C	D	E F	G	H	I J	K L	M	N O	P	Q R	S	T U V	W X Y Z

To find entries for H–Z, use the table of contents above.

== See also ==
- List of South African plant botanical authors
- List of botanists
- Category:Botanists
- List of Russian botanists
- List of zoologists by author abbreviation
