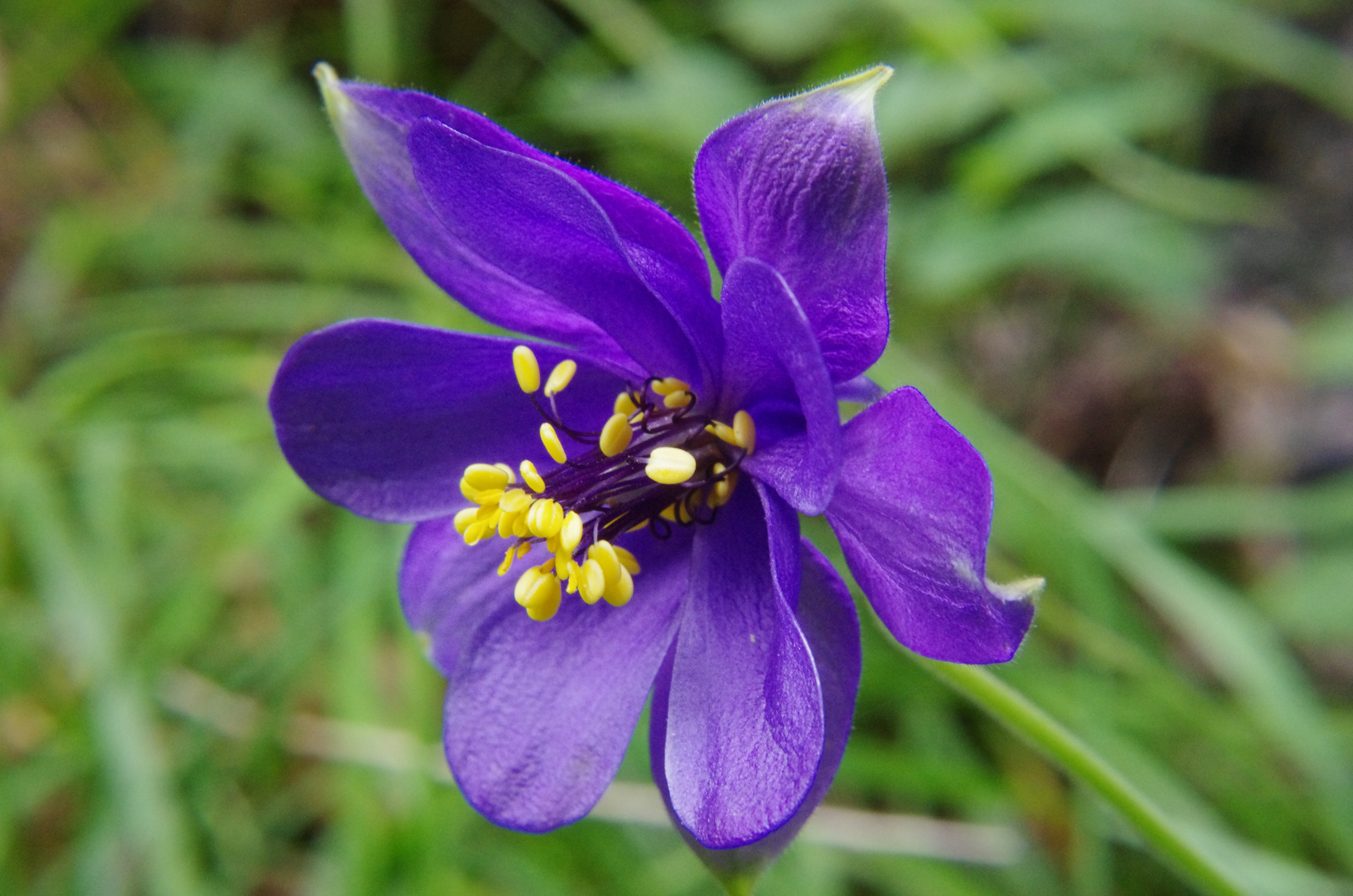
- Flower
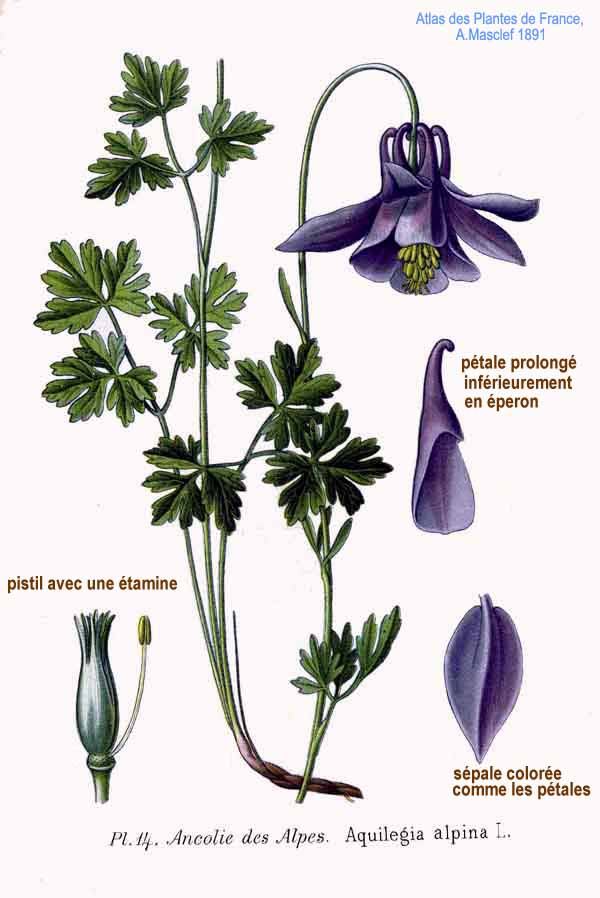
- Botanical illustration

Conservation status
- Least Concern (IUCN 3.1)

Scientific classification
- Kingdom: Plantae
- Clade: Tracheophytes
- Clade: Angiosperms
- Clade: Eudicots
- Order: Ranunculales
- Family: Ranunculaceae
- Genus: Aquilegia
- Species: A. alpina

Binomial name
- Aquilegia alpina L.
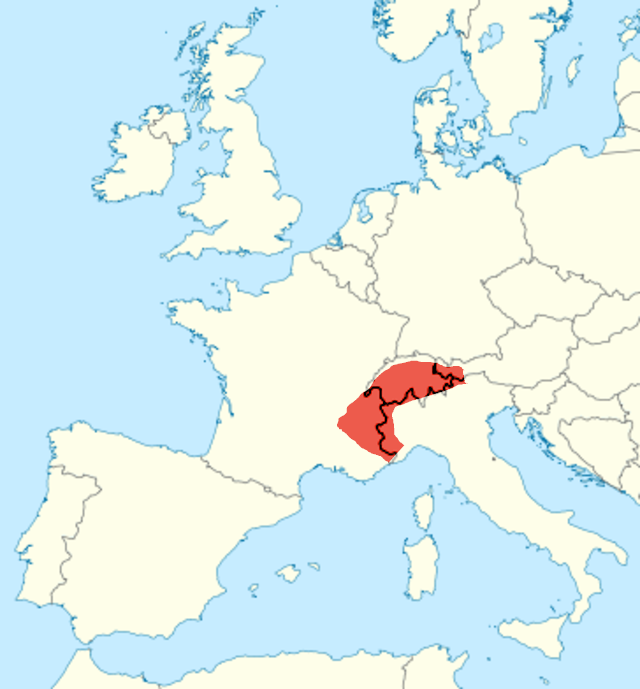
- Approximate native distribution of Aquilegia alpina in Western Europe

Synonyms
- Aquilegia alpina f. gracilis Chenevard & Braun-Blanq.; Aquilegia alpina var. minor Rouy & Foucaud; Aquilegia montana Sternb.; Aquilegia reuteriana Rchb. ex Nyman; Aquilegia vulgaris subsp. alpina (L.) Hook.f. & Thomson; Aquilegia vulgaris var. typica Brühl

= Aquilegia alpina =

Species of flowering plant

Aquilegia alpina, often called the alpine columbine or breath of God, is a perennial species of flowering plant in the family Ranunculaceae, native to the western and central Alps. Though rare in its Swiss, Austrian, and Italian range, it is commonly found in the French Maritime Alps. A. alpina is appreciated for its light blue to blue-purple flowers.

The species has been in cultivation for several centuries, but plants sold as A. alpina are often hybrids with other Aquilegia species or different columbine species entirely. True A. alpina plants possess straight or slightly curved nectar spurs, distinguishing it from other species and hybrids with hooked spurs. At 21.5 mm (0.85 in) long, these spurs are the longest of any Eurasian member of the genus Aquilegia.

== Description ==
Aquilegia alpina is a perennial that grows to between 15 cm (5.9 in) and 60 cm (24 in) tall. Leaves are biternate and in a basal arrange (growing from the base of the stem). The lower portions of the stems are pilose and the upper portions are densely pubescent. The middle leaflets are between 22 mm (0.87 in) and 28 mm (1.1 in) long and between 24 mm (0.94 in) and 34 mm (1.3 in) wide. They are petioluled.

Plants feature between one and three (occasionally up to 5) flowers per stem. Each flower is nodding. The flowers are bright light blue to blue-purple, measuring 6–9 cm (2.4–3.5 in) across. The species's nectar spurs at the tip of the flower is straight or only slightly curved, and are the longest of the Eurasian species of Aquilegia at 21.5 mm (0.85 in). The spreading sepals range in shape from lance-ovate to wider and are between 3 cm (1.2 in) and 4.5 cm (1.8 in) long.

The plant's flowers are considered to possess unusual beauty. Robert Nold described the American botanist Philip A. Munz as having "almost broke down completely" when Munz described A. alpina as "one of the most beautiful of all the Aquilegias". The British botanist Reginald Farrer was similarly appreciative of the flower's appearance.

== Taxonomy ==
The species was first described as Aquilegia alpina in 1753 by Carl Linnaeus in his Species Plantarum. He described the type locality as Switzerland.

In 1882, a specimen was identified as a variant of Isopyrum thalictroides and given the name I. thalictroides var. insignis by Gibelli and Pirotta. However, this specimen was reevaluated by Maria Adele Signorini and Enio Nardi in 1999 and identified as an example of A. alpina. They attributed this false identification to the absence lack of spurs on the specimen's sole flower. Since the specimen was the type specimen and only known specimen of I. thalictroides var. insignis, Signorini and Nardi said that name should be considered a heterotypic nomenclature synonym of A. alpina.

The nectar spurs of A. alpina are the longest of Eurasian species of Aquilegia. Among these species, nectar spur length varies little and there is no evidence of evolution to exploit hawkmoth pollination. A. alpina's spurs are 10 mm (0.39 in) shorter than those of the shortest hawkmoth-pollinated North American member of the genus, Aquilegia pubescens, which has spurs that can reach 32.4 mm (1.28 in) long. A 2007 study by Justen B. Whittall and Scott A. Hodges attributed this discrepancy in nectar spur length between Eurasian and North American Aquilegia species despite the presence of hawkmoths in both ranges to the absence of hummingbirds in Eurasia. Whittall and Hodges theorized that hummingbirds served as a "stepping stone" to nectar spur elongation adapted to hawkmoth pollination.

The word columbine derives from the Latin word columbinus, meaning "dove", a reference to the flowers' appearance of a group of doves. The genus name Aquilegia may come from the Latin word for "eagle", aquila, in reference to the pedals' resemblance to eagle talons. Aquilegia may also derive from aquam legere, which is Latin for "to collect water", or aquilegium, a Latin word for a container of water. The specific name alpina references the plant's native habitat of mountain meadows, as the German word Alp refers to these meadows. The plant has been commonly referred to both as the "alpine columbine" and the "breath of God".

== Distribution and habitat ==
The species is native to subalpine regions of France, Switzerland, Austria, and Italy, at altitudes from 1,300–1,900 m (4,300–6,200 ft), typically in rocky areas and stony pastures with carbonate bedrock. In the subalpine meadows of southwestern Switzerland, Austria, and northwestern Italy, the plant is rare. However, it is present with greater commonality in the Maritime Alps of France.

== Ecology ==
Aquilegia alpina flowers from July to September, and is pollinated by bees. Hybrid A. alpina with hooked nectar spurs that were cultivated in the United States have been observed being foraged by the moth species Hemaris thysbe.

=== Pests and diseases ===
The flowers are known to be attacked by the gall midge species Macrolabis aquilegiae and the aphid Nasonovia werderi. Most recorded parasites of A. alpina attack the leaves: the leaf miner Phytomyza minuscula and cabbage whitefly Aleyrodes proletella, the oomycete Peronospora aquilegiicola which causes the disease Aquilegia downy mildew, and the fungi Erysiphe aquilegiae var. aquilegiae (causing powdery mildew), Puccinia actaeae-elymi, and Puccinia agrostidis.

== Conservation ==
As of October 2024, the IUCN Red List listed Aquilegia alpina as Least Concern (LC). This status was last reviewed on 24 June 2010. In Switzerland, it is listed as fully protected in the Bern, Glarus, Grisons, Obwalden, Ticino, and Uri cantons.

== Cultivation ==
Aquilegia alpina has a long history of cultivation and was a common offering by 1946. Most plants sold as A alpina are instead crosses between multiple Aquilegia species, a phenomenon common across the genus and the result of hundreds of years of cultivation. By 1946, Munz said that supposed "A. alpina" plants were generally hybridizations incorporating Aquilegia vulgaris; this lineage is discernible in the hooked nectar spurs typical of these plants. Other plants labeled A. alpina were instead Aquilegia bertolonii. Nold noted that Munz's observations remained true in 2003.
