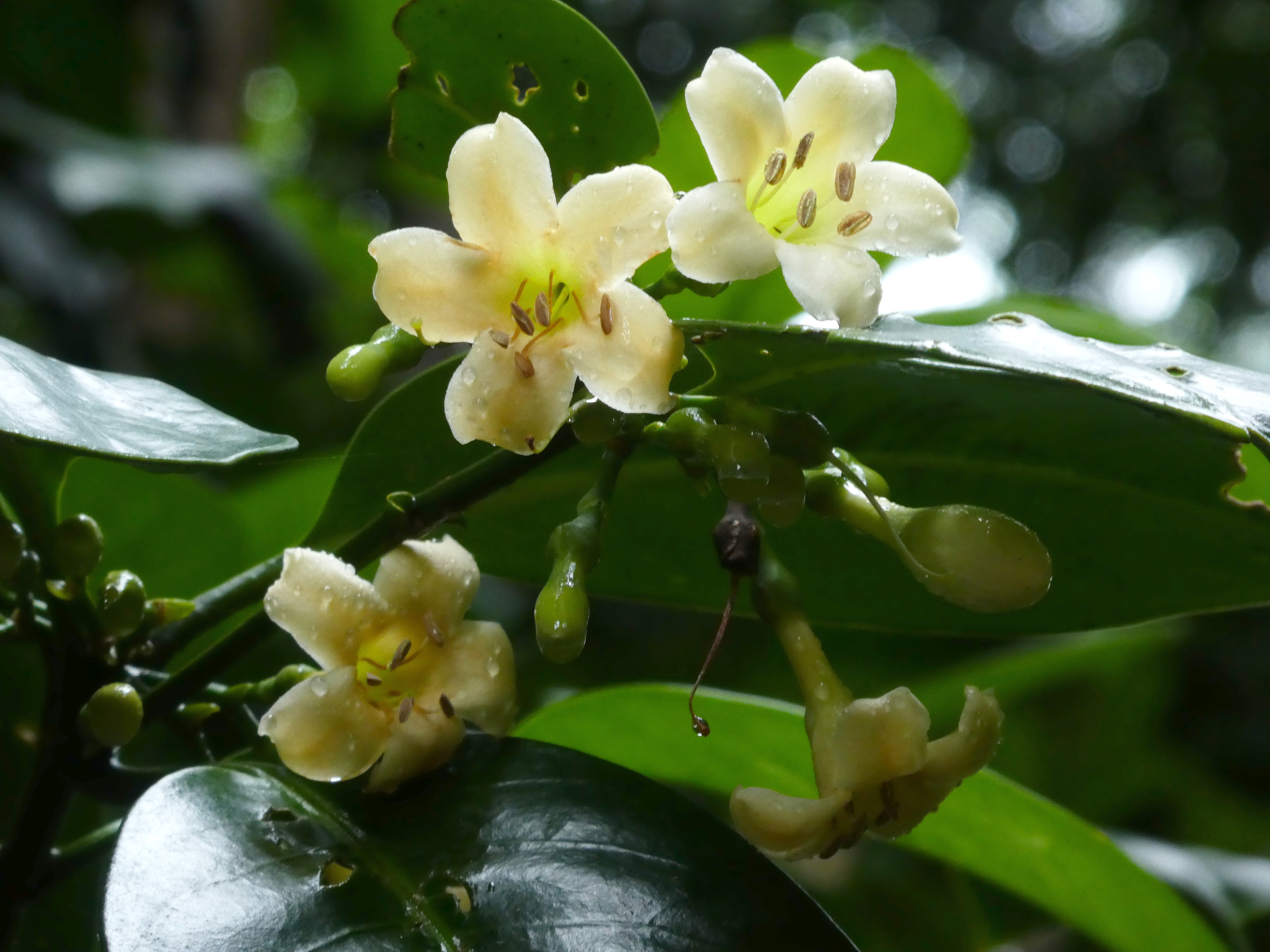
- In flower at the Cairns Botanic Gardens

Conservation status
- Least Concern (NCA)

Scientific classification
- Kingdom: Plantae
- Clade: Tracheophytes
- Clade: Angiosperms
- Clade: Eudicots
- Clade: Asterids
- Order: Gentianales
- Family: Gentianaceae
- Genus: Fagraea
- Species: F. cambagei

Binomial name
- Fagraea cambagei Domin

= Fagraea cambagei =

Porcelain fruit

Species of flowering plant

Fagraea cambagei, commonly known as porcelain fruit, pink jitta, or yellowheart, is a plant in the family Gentianaceae which is endemic to rainforested parts of coastal northeast Queensland, Australia.

== Description ==
This is an evergreen tree growing up to 20 m (66 ft) in height, and the trunk of the tree is often marked with a plaited or woven pattern (see gallery). The leaves are simple (i.e., without lobes or divisions) with an opposite arrangement. They are held on thick petioles (stems) measuring between 2 and 3.5 cm (0.79 and 1.38 in) long, they are elliptic to obovate in outline, and they measure up to 23 by 9 cm (9.1 by 3.5 in).

The inflorescence is a terminal panicle with up to 30 fragrant bell-shaped flowers. They measure up to 5 cm (2.0 in) long with five cream-coloured petals, and may occur at any time of year. The fruit is, in botanical terms, a berry up to 3.5 by 4.5 cm (1.4 by 1.8 in), white, pink or red and with a shiny appearance that gives rise to the common name "porcelain fruit". They may or may not contain seeds, which are about 7 mm (0.28 in) long.

== Taxonomy ==
Fagraea cambagei was first described in 1928 by the Czech botanist Karel Domin, and published in the journal Bibliotheca Botanica. Up until early 2023, Plants of the World Online had misapplied the name Fagraea gracilipes to this species.

=== Etymology ===
The genus name Fagraea was coined by Carl Peter Thunberg in honour of the botanist and physician Jonas Theodor Fagraeus. Domin created the species epithet cambagei in honour of the Australian botanist and surveyor Richard Hind Cambage.

== Distribution and habitat ==
The porcelain fruit grows as an understory tree in well developed coastal or sub-coastal rainforest, often in very waterlogged habitats such as swamps and close to creeks. Its range extends from near Rossville south to the area around Innisfail, and from sea level to 500 m (1,600 ft).

== Conservation ==
This species is listed by the Queensland Department of Environment and Science as least concern. As of 5 May 2023, it has not been assessed by the International Union for Conservation of Nature (IUCN).

== Gallery ==
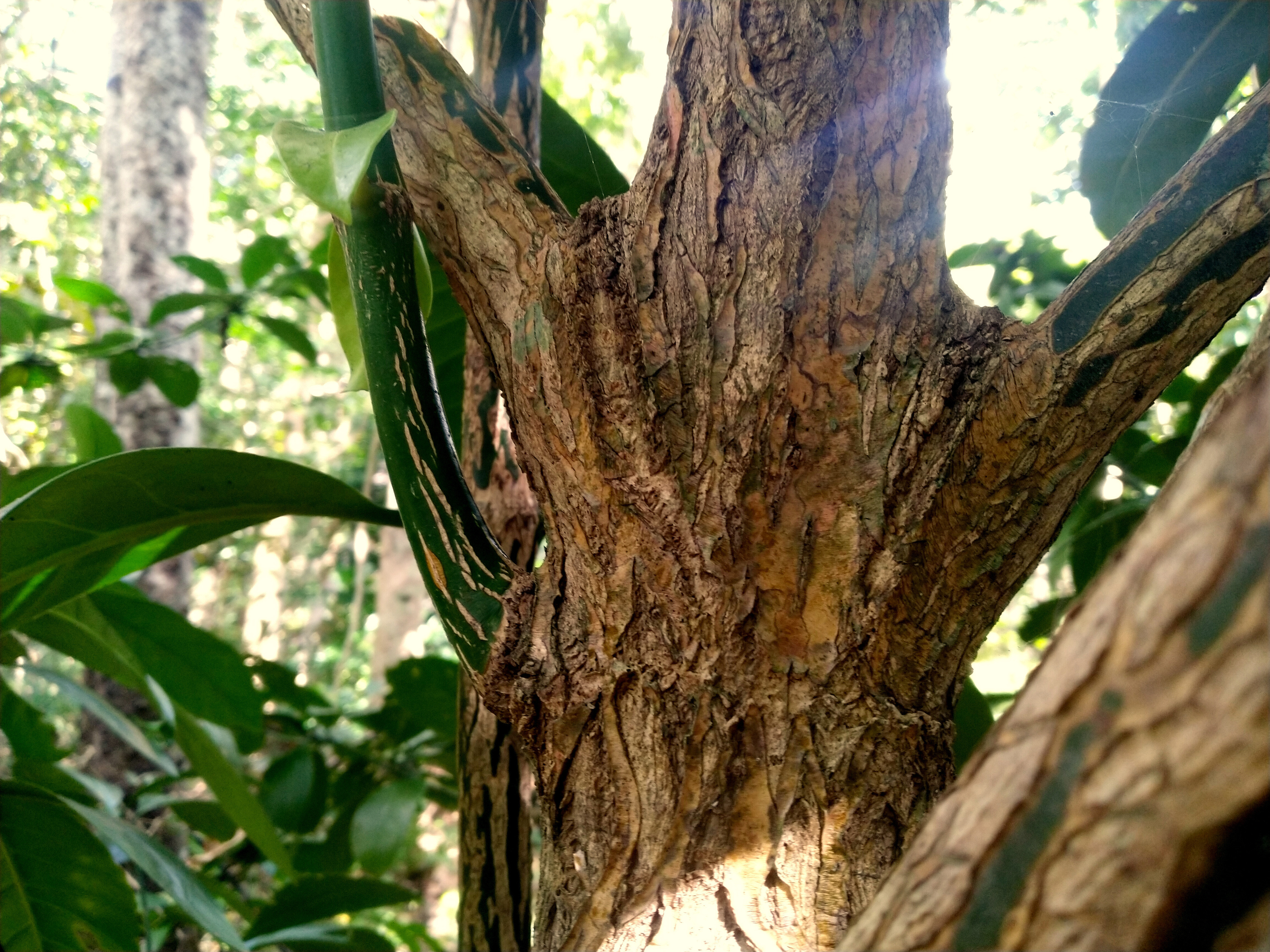
Trunk with distinctive "plaited" appearance

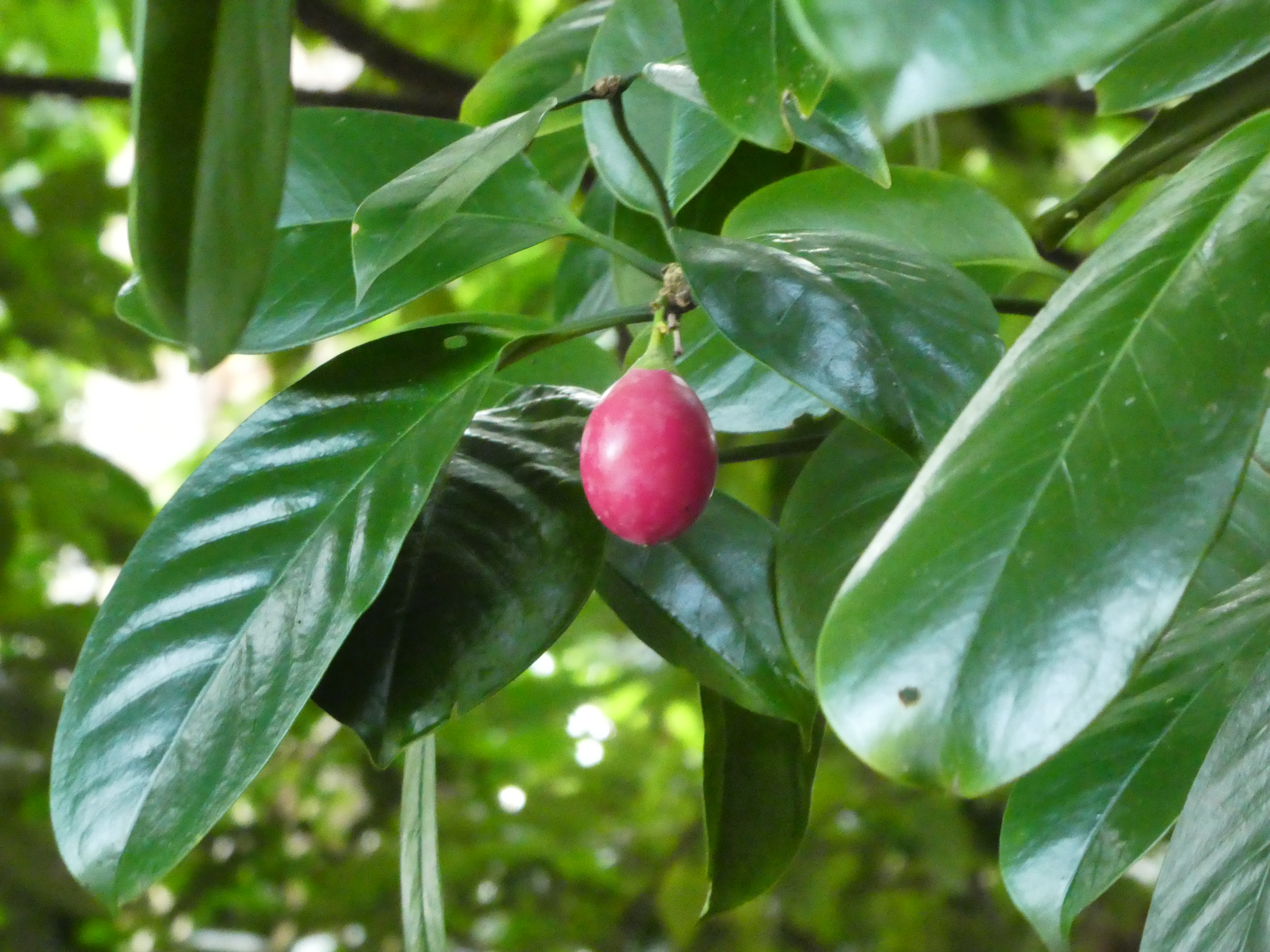
Pink fruit

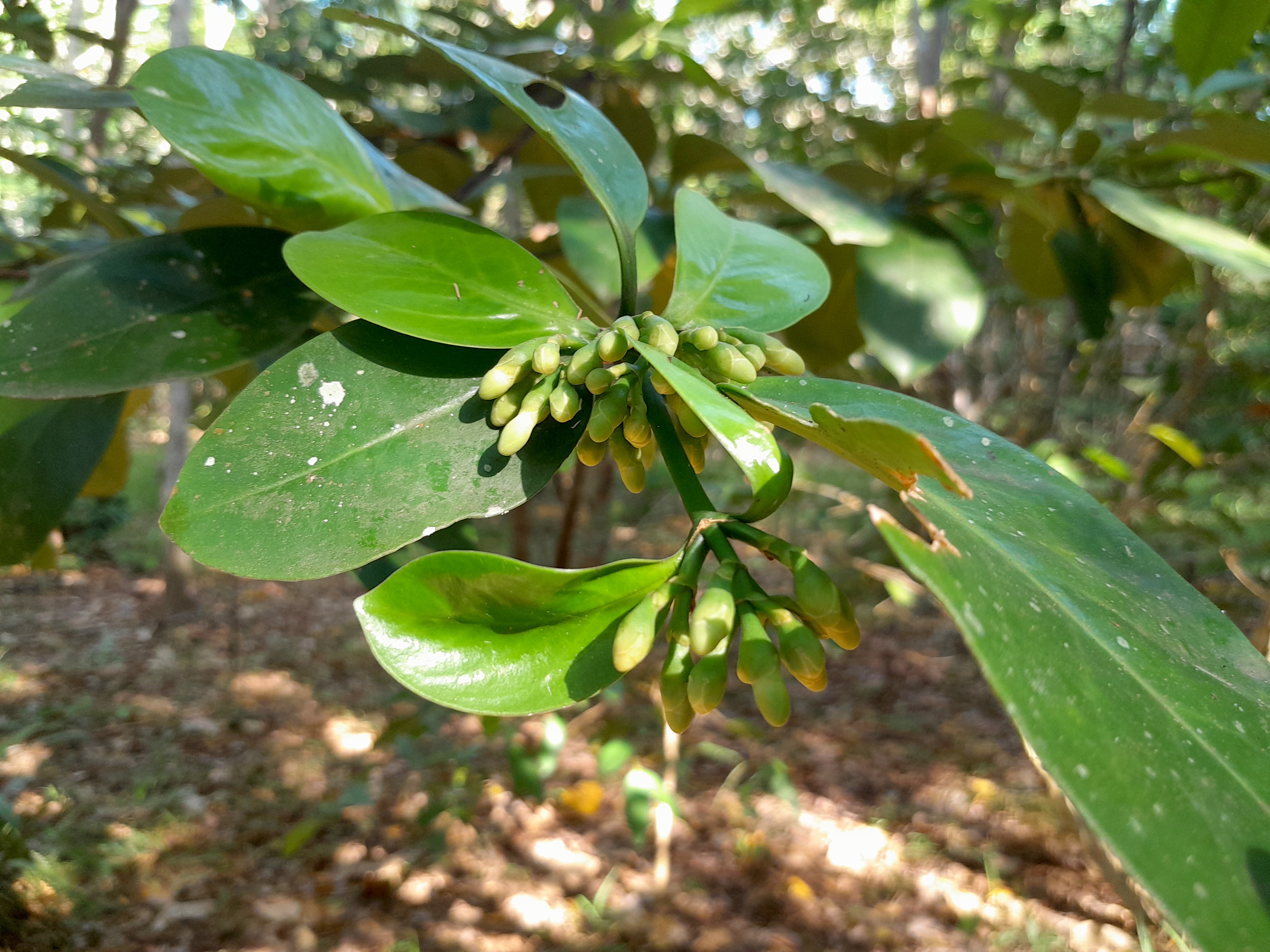
Flower buds

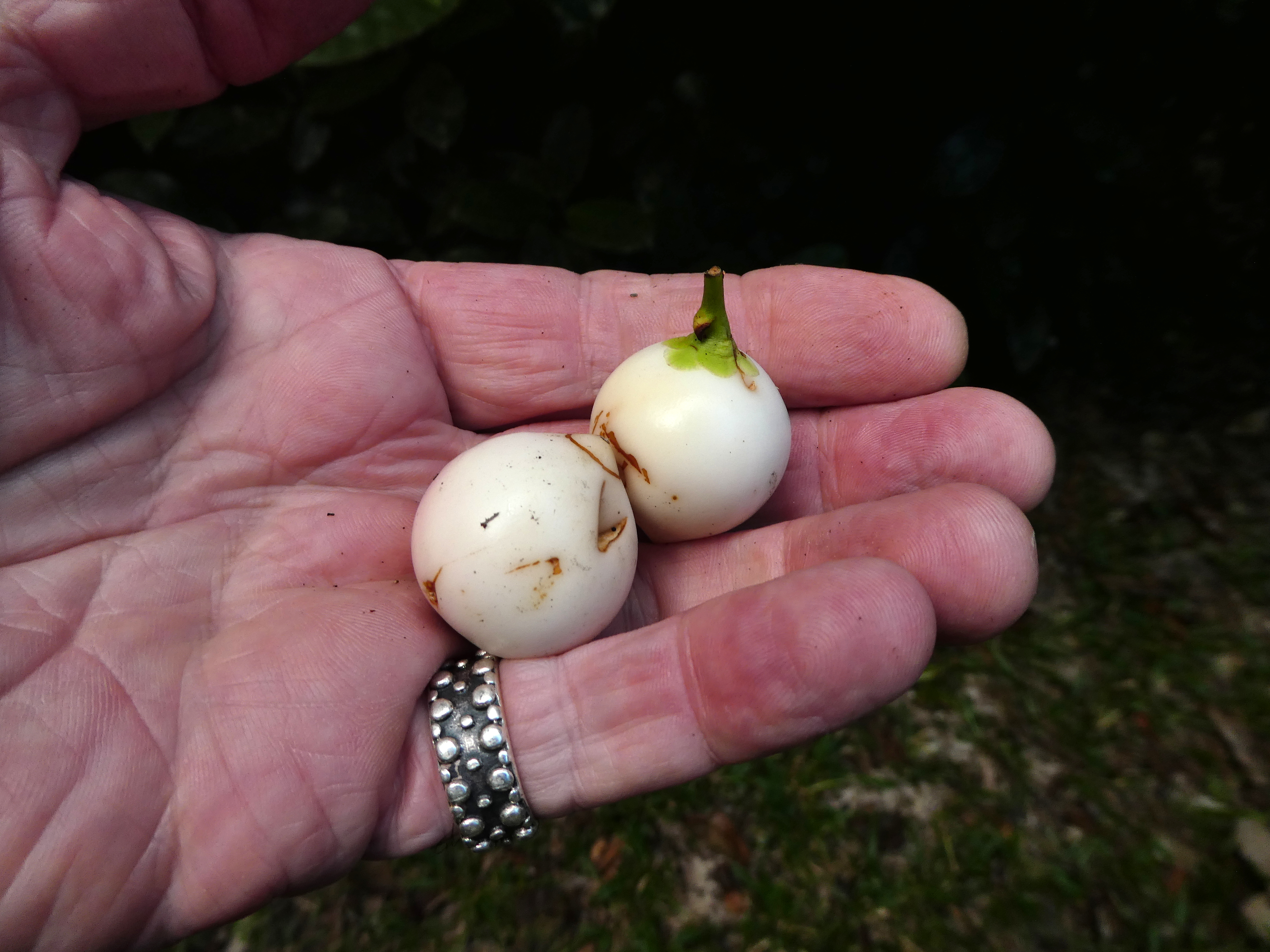
White fruit

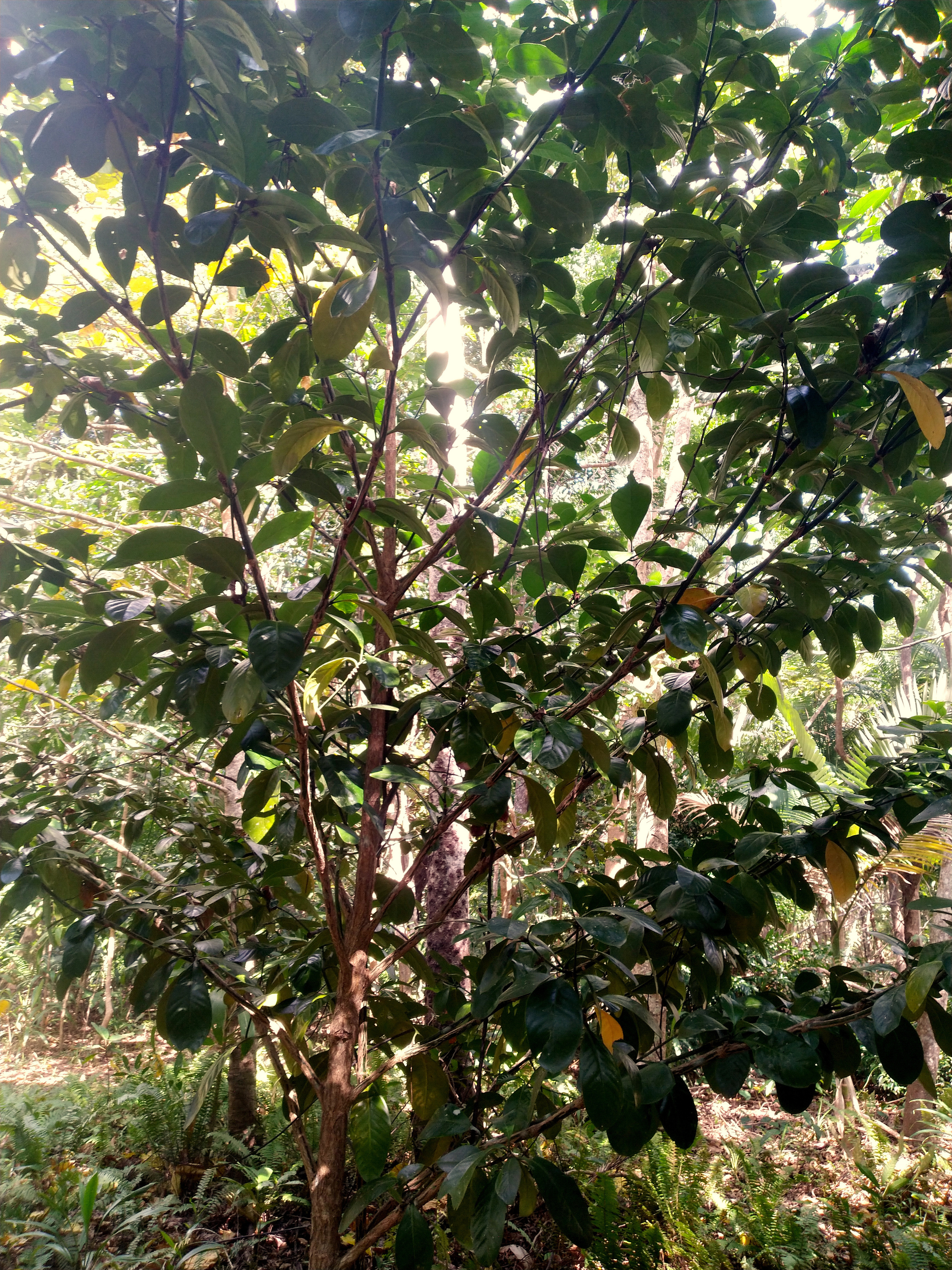
Habit
