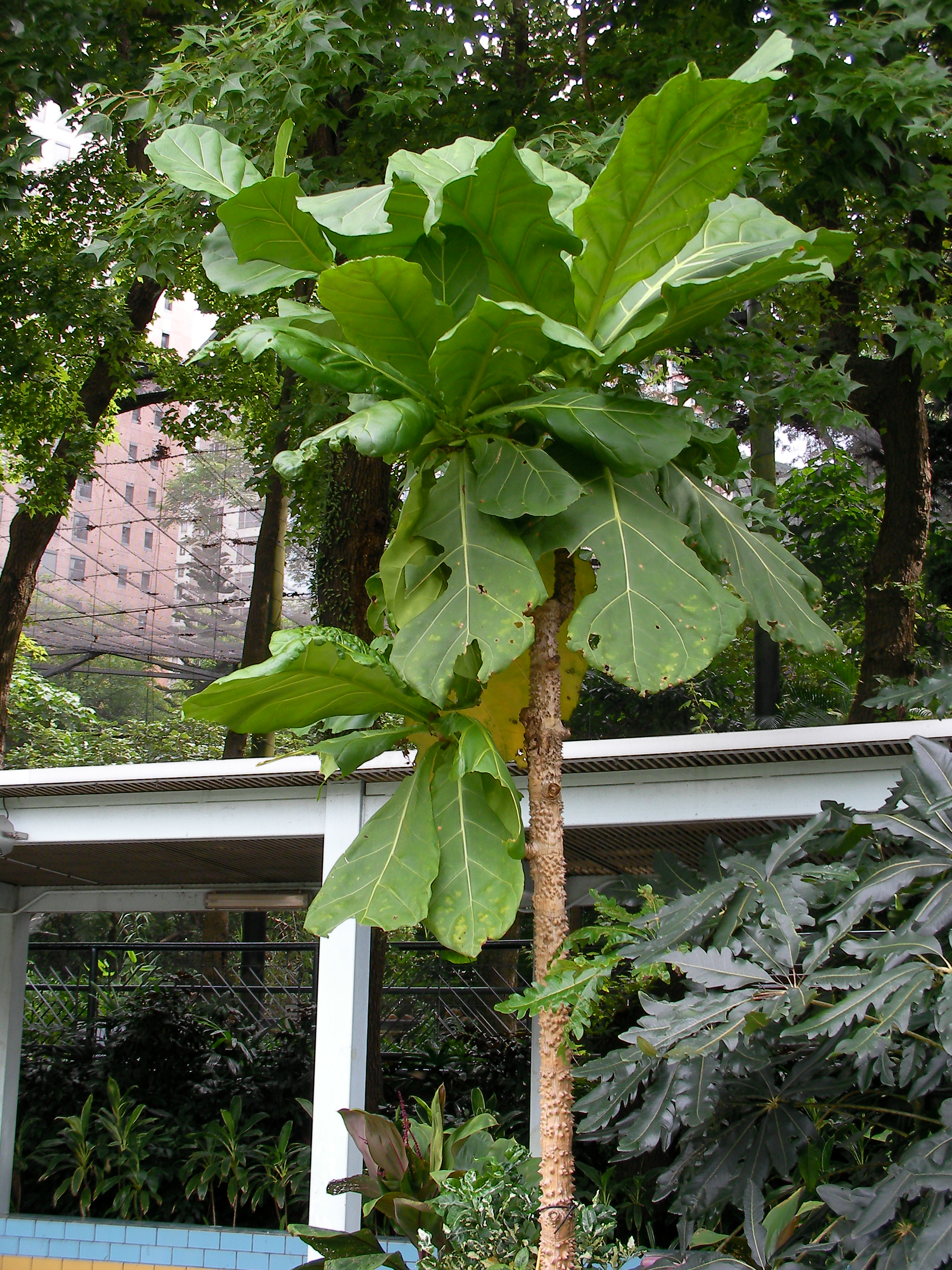
- Fagraea crenulata

Scientific classification
- Kingdom: Plantae
- Clade: Tracheophytes
- Clade: Angiosperms
- Clade: Eudicots
- Clade: Asterids
- Order: Gentianales
- Family: Gentianaceae
- Tribe: Potalieae
- Subtribe: Potaliinae
- Genus: Fagraea; Thunb.

= Fagraea =

Genus of plants

Fagraea is a genus of plants in the family Gentianaceae. It includes trees, shrubs, lianas, and epiphytes. They can be found in forests, swamps, and other habitat in Asia, Australia, and the Pacific Islands, with the center of diversity in Malesia.

Many Fagraea species have a variety of human uses, particularly the wood and flowers. The flowers open in the evening and are often fragrant and bat-pollinated. They are so conspicuous they have roles in Polynesian mythology. They make the trees attractive as ornamental plantings. Some are used in leis. Fagraea auriculata produces a flower over 30 centimeters wide, one of the largest flowers of any plant in the world. Many species, especially the Malesian taxa, have valuable wood. It was used to carve tikis. Some have been used in traditional medicine, perfumery, and aromatherapy. The flowers are featured in the traditional artwork of various cultures.

The fruits are food for many animals, including cassowaries, flying foxes, and civets.

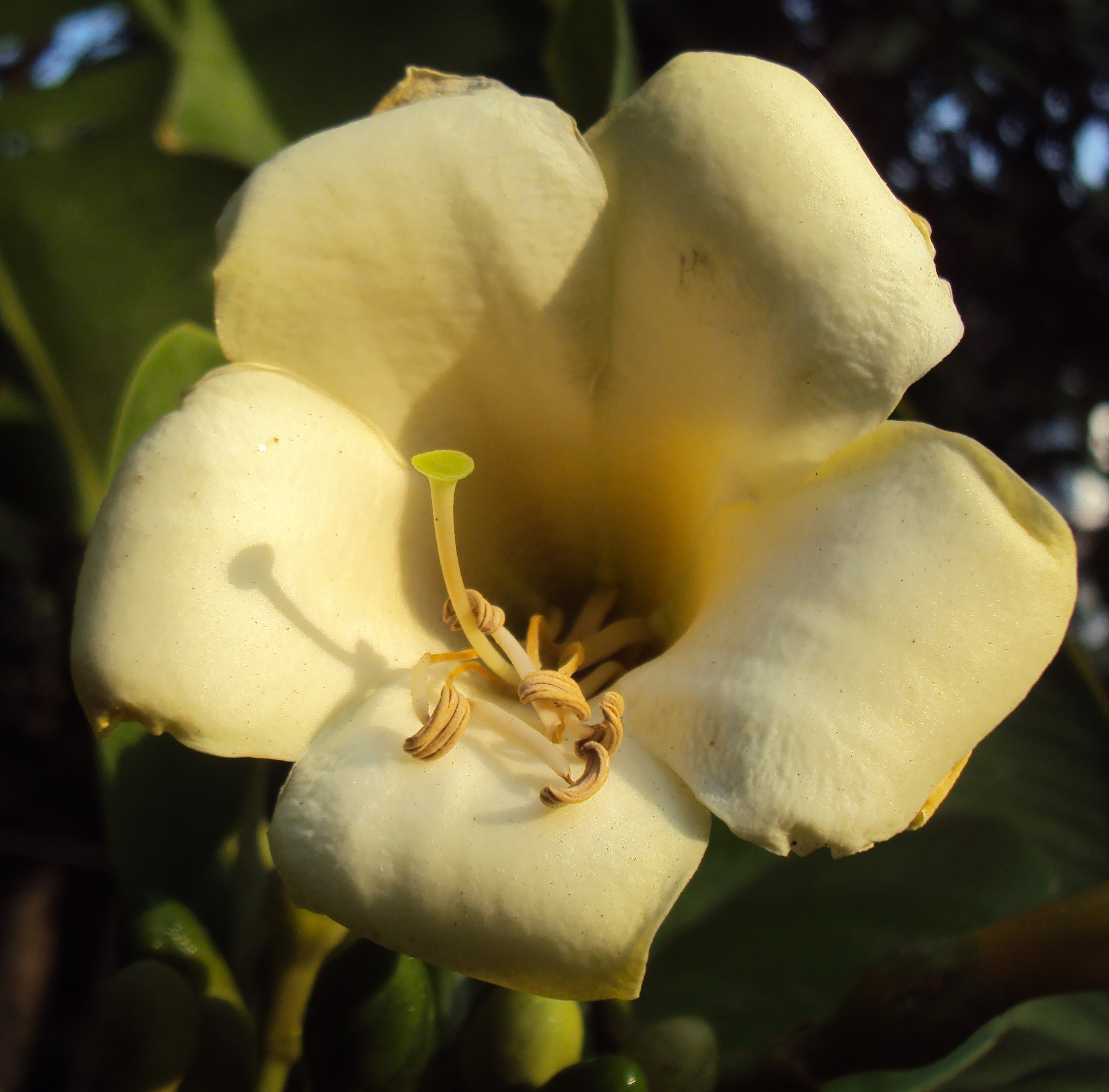
Fagraea ceilanica

== Species ==
As of May 2023, Plants of the World Online accepts the following 65 species:

- Fagraea acutibracteata K.M.Wong & Sugau
- Fagraea amabilis S.Moore
- Fagraea annulata Hiern
- Fagraea auriculata Jack
- Fagraea berteroana A.Gray ex Benth.
- Fagraea blumei G.Don
- Fagraea bodenii Wernham
- Fagraea borneensis Scheff.
- Fagraea cambagei Domin
- Fagraea cameronensis K.M.Wong & Sugumaran
- Fagraea carnosa Jack
- Fagraea carstensensis Wernham
- Fagraea ceilanica Thunb.
- Fagraea coromandelina Wight
- Fagraea crassifolia Blume
- Fagraea curtisii King & Gamble
- Fagraea dasyantha Gilg & Gilg-Ben.
- Fagraea dolichopoda Gilg & Gilg-Ben.
- Fagraea dulitensis K.M.Wong & Sugau
- Fagraea epiphytica Elmer
- Fagraea euneura Scheff.
- Fagraea eymae Backer ex Leenh.
- Fagraea fagraeacea (F.Muell.) Druce
- Fagraea fastigiata Blume
- Fagraea floribunda K.M.Wong & Sugau
- Fagraea fraserensis K.M.Wong & Sugumaran
- Fagraea gardeniiflora Wernham
- Fagraea gardenioides Ridl.
- Fagraea gitingensis Elmer
- Fagraea graciliflora Leenh.
- Fagraea gracilipes A.Gray
- Fagraea havilandii K.M.Wong & Sugau
- Fagraea iliasii K.M.Wong & Sugau
- Fagraea imperialis Miq.
- Fagraea involucrata Merr.
- Fagraea kalimantanensis (Leenh.) K.M.Wong & Sugau
- Fagraea kinabaluensis K.M.Wong & Sugau
- Fagraea kinghamii K.M.Wong & Sugumaran
- Fagraea kuminii K.M.Wong & Sugau
- Fagraea larutensis Sugumaran
- Fagraea latibracteata Sugumaran
- Fagraea litoralis Blume
- Fagraea longiflora Merr.
- Fagraea longipetiolata K.M.Wong & Sugau
- Fagraea macroscypha Baker
- Fagraea megalantha K.M.Wong & Sugau
- Fagraea oblonga King & Gamble
- Fagraea obtusifolia Merr. & L.M.Perry
- Fagraea oreophila K.M.Wong & Sugau
- Fagraea plumeriiflora DC.
- Fagraea pyriformis S.Moore
- Fagraea rarissima K.M.Wong & Sugau
- Fagraea renae K.M.Wong & Sugau
- Fagraea resinosa Leenh.
- Fagraea ridleyi King & Gamble
- Fagraea salticola Leenh.
- Fagraea splendens Blume
- Fagraea stonei K.M.Wong & Sugau
- Fagraea tacapala Leenh.
- Fagraea ternatana Miq.
- Fagraea truncata Blume
- Fagraea tubulosa Blume
- Fagraea tuyukii K.M.Wong & Sugau
- Fagraea umbelliflora Gilg & Gilg-Ben.
- Fagraea woodiana F.Muell.

== Formerly placed here ==
- Fagraea fragrans Roxb., now Cyrtophyllum fragrans (Roxb.) DC.
- Fagraea malayana Mart., now Utania racemosa (Jack ex Wall.) Sugumaran
- Fagraea peregrina (Reinw.) Blume, now Cyrtophyllum fragrans (Roxb.) DC.
- Fagraea racemosa Jack ex Wall., now Utania racemosa (Jack ex Wall.) Sugumaran
- Fagraea ridleyi Gand., now Cyrtophyllum fragrans (Roxb.) DC.
- Fagraea thwaitesii F.Muell., now Utania racemosa (Jack ex Wall.) Sugumaran

== Gallery ==
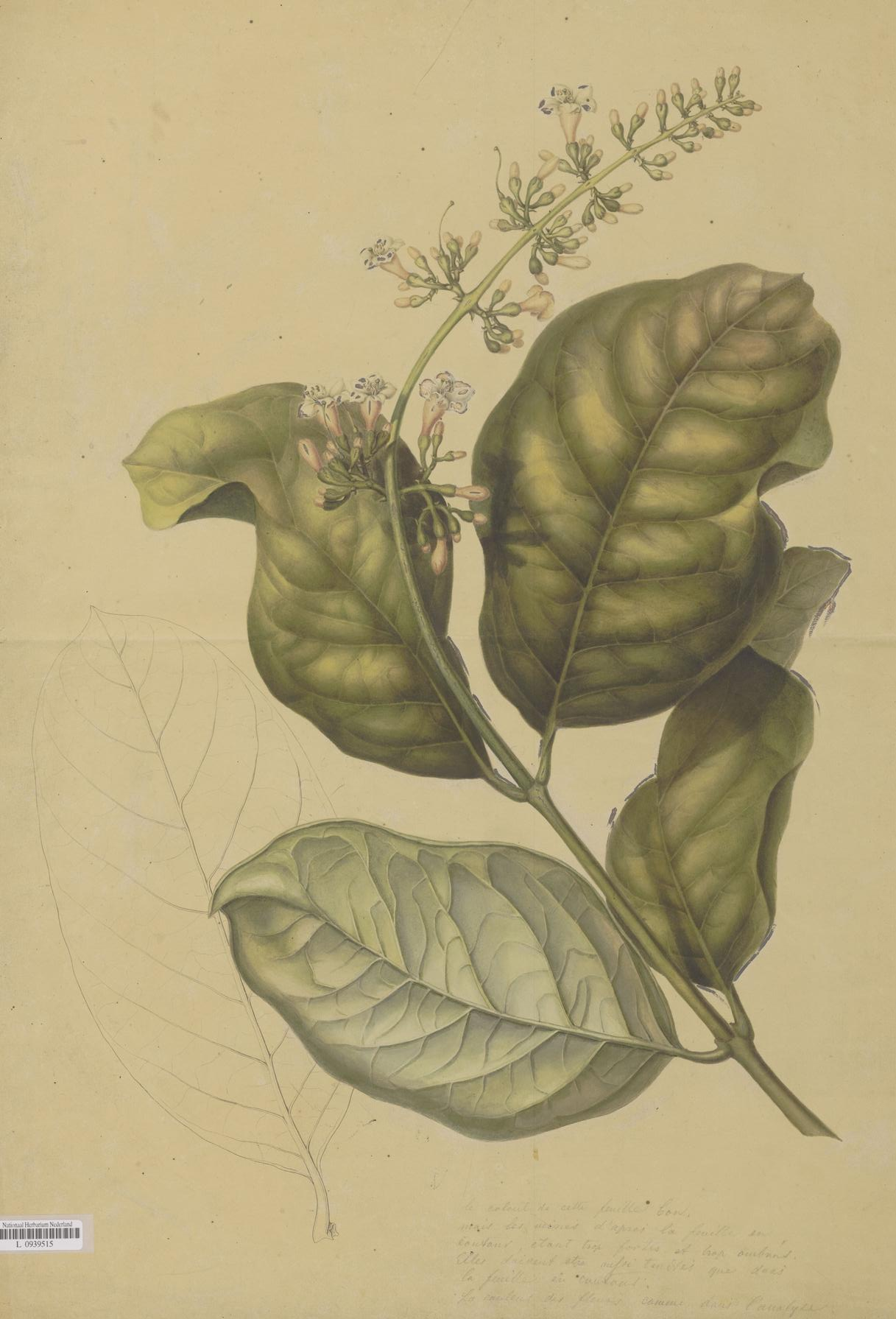
Fagraea racemosa Wallich, 19th century

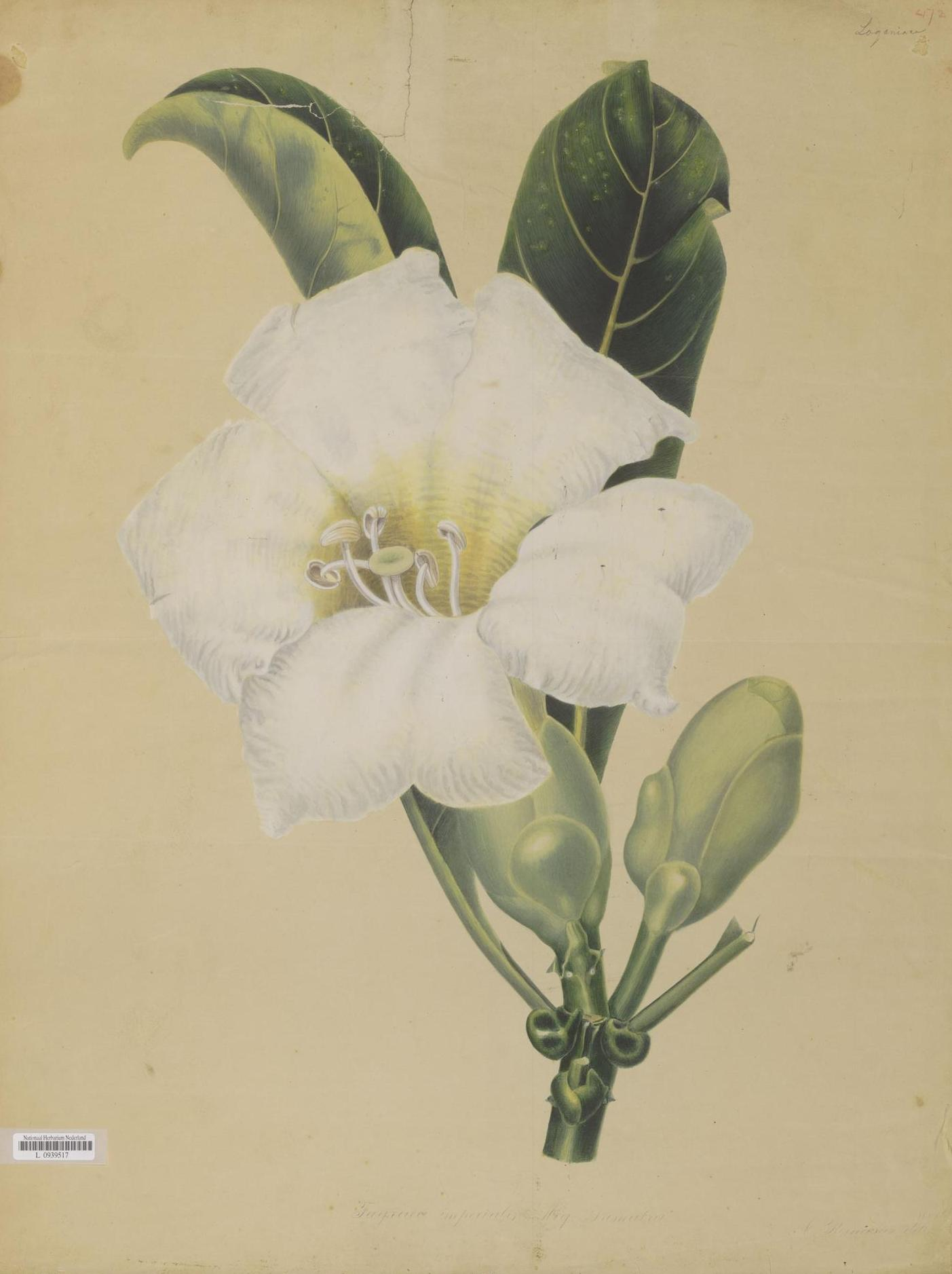
Fagraea imperialis Miquel, A. Bernecker, ~1860
