= Gustave Prosper Vidal =

French botanist (1835–1905)

Gustave Prosper Vidal (1835 – 21 September 1905, Plascassier) was a French botanist. His botanical specimens were collected entirely in France.

Vidal was employed as a French civil servant collecting taxes for the Administration des Contributions directes. He was promoted to the rank of Inspecteur, working in Privas with considerable distinction. But, as soon as his years of service gave him the right to retire, he retired in order to collect plants and study botany. From 1884 until his death in 1905 he was a member of the Société Botanique de France.

In retirement he first lived in Nice and then moved to his property in Plascassier, where, in addition to his house, a number of buildings were reserved exclusively for his herbarium and his library. Due to his unceasing labor, both the herbarium and library acquired considerable value, with many specimens and documents excellently presented and classified. His herbarium and library were made available to botanists with the greatest liberality. Vidal's botanical activity is reflected almost entirely in the correspondence he maintained with many distinguished botanists, such as Charles Flahault, Julien Foucaud, Antoine Le Grand (1839–1905), and Casimir Arvet-Touvet. In his last years, Vidal worked closely with Ludovic Legré (1838–1904). These two botanists gathered materials for the publication of a flora of Provence but the work was not ready for publication when they died. Vidal greatly contributed to the knowledge of the flora of the Maritime Alps through his numerous collections and distributions of plants from this region. He also took an active part in the organization of the Société Botanique de France's Barcelonnette session.

Upon his death at age 70, Vidal's will endowed the City of Nice with the valuable collections of his library and herbarium, together with the money necessary for their installation and maintenance. He also left a generous sum of money to the Société Botanique de France.
