= Ulmus × hollandica 'Tricolor' =

Elm cultivar

- Hybrid parentage: U. glabra × U. minor
- Cultivar: 'Tricolor'
- Origin: Europe

The hybrid elm cultivar Ulmus × hollandica 'Tricolor' was first listed as U. suberosa tricolor by C. de Vos in 1867.

== Description ==
The tree was distinguished by its silver-variegated foliage, the leaves near the tips of growing branches coloured red; it was not a rapid grower, however.

== Cultivation ==
The Späth nursery of Berlin marketed an U. montana tricolor in the late 19th century. An U. montana tricolor, probably sourced from Späth, was planted at the Dominion Arboretum, Ottawa, in 1896. Three specimens of U. montana tricolor were supplied by the Späth nursery to the Royal Botanic Garden Edinburgh in 1902, and may survive in Edinburgh as it was the practice of the Garden to distribute trees about the city (viz. the Wentworth Elm); the current list of Living Accessions held in the Garden per se does not list the plant. The tree was known to have been marketed as U. montana 'Tricolor' in Poland in the 19th century by the Ulrich nursery, Warsaw, and may still survive in Eastern Europe. 'Tricolor' is not known to have been introduced to Australasia.

== Synonymy ==
- Ulmus campestris elegans foliis argenteo variegatis Hort.: Goeschke , Bunte Gehölze 46, 1900.
- Ulmus suberosa tricolor: C. de Vos in Beredeneerd woordenboek der voornaamste heesters en coniferen, in Nederland gekweekt 137, 1867.
