= Hieracium sprucei =

Conservation status
- Data Deficient (IUCN 3.1)

Scientific classification
- Kingdom: Plantae
- Clade: Tracheophytes
- Clade: Angiosperms
- Clade: Eudicots
- Clade: Asterids
- Order: Asterales
- Family: Asteraceae
- Genus: Hieracium
- Species: H. sprucei

Binomial name
- Hieracium sprucei Arv.-Touv.

Species of flowering plant

Hieracium sprucei is a species of flowering plant in the family Asteraceae that is endemic to Ecuador.
