= Utania =

Scientific classification
- Kingdom: Plantae
- Clade: Embryophytes
- Clade: Tracheophytes
- Clade: Angiosperms
- Clade: Eudicots
- Clade: Asterids
- Order: Gentianales
- Family: Gentianaceae
- Tribe: Potalieae
- Subtribe: Potaliinae
- Genus: Utania; G.Don

Species
- See text

Synonyms
- Kentia Steud.; Kuhlia Reinw.

Genus of flowering plants

Utania is a genus of flowering plants belonging to the gentian family (Gentianaceae), the tribe Potalieae, and the subtribe Potaliinae. A small genus, it has 12 species.

== Description ==
Small to medium trees, usually 1–3 m (3 ft 3 in – 9 ft 10 in) tall, but occasionally up to 30 m (98 ft). The trunk is orthotropic (grows vertically), monopodial (growing upward from a single point), with continuous growth. Bark becomes fissured as tree ages. Features that distinguish this genus from other Gentianaceae include an architecture with continuous stem or trunk growth; branches that grow plagiotropic (inclined away from the vertical, inclined towards the horizontal) with a leaf arrangement that is distichous ("two rowed", where leaves are arranged in two vertical columns on opposite sides of the stem); non-resinous terminal vegetative buds; and an inflorescence that is pendulous and has a structure that is an elongate panicle with branching that is cymose (several pairs of branching, condensed, distinctly shorter than rachis), white flowers; the dried fruit (pale to dark brown at maturity) have a surface that is firm and smooth, with the epidermis not detaching from the pericarp. Shared with some other genera, Utania has fruit that do not produce any latex and polygonal seeds.

== Distribution ==
Plants of the genus are found from Solomon Islands to the Andaman and Nicobar Islands in Tropical Asia. Regions in which they are found include: Solomon Islands; Australia (Queensland, Northern Territory); Papua New Guinea mainland; Indonesia (Papua, West Papua, Maluku, Sulawesi, Kalimantan, Jawa; Sumatera); Philippines; Malaysia (Sabah, Sarawak, Peninsular Malaysia); Brunei; Singapore; Thailand; Vietnam; Cambodia; Laos; Myanmar; Nicobar Islands; Andaman Islands.

=== List of accepted species ===
- Utania austromalayensis Sugumaran
- Utania cuspidata (Blume) K.M.Wong, Sugumaran & Sugau
- Utania maingayi (C.B.Clarke) Sugumaran
- Utania montana (K.M.Wong & Sugau) K.M.Wong, Sugumaran & Sugau
- Utania nervosa K.M.Wong & Sugumaran
- Utania peninsularis (K.M.Wong & Sugau) Sugumaran
- Utania philippinensis (K.M.Wong & Sugau) K.M.Wong, Sugumaran & Sugau
- Utania racemosa (Jack) Sugumaran
- Utania spicata (Baker) K.M.Wong, Sugumaran & Sugau
- Utania stenophylla (Becc. ex Merr.) K.M.Wong, Sugumaran & Sugau
- Utania teysmannii (Cammerl.) K.M.Wong, Sugumaran & Sugau
- Utania volubilis (Wall.) Sugumaran
