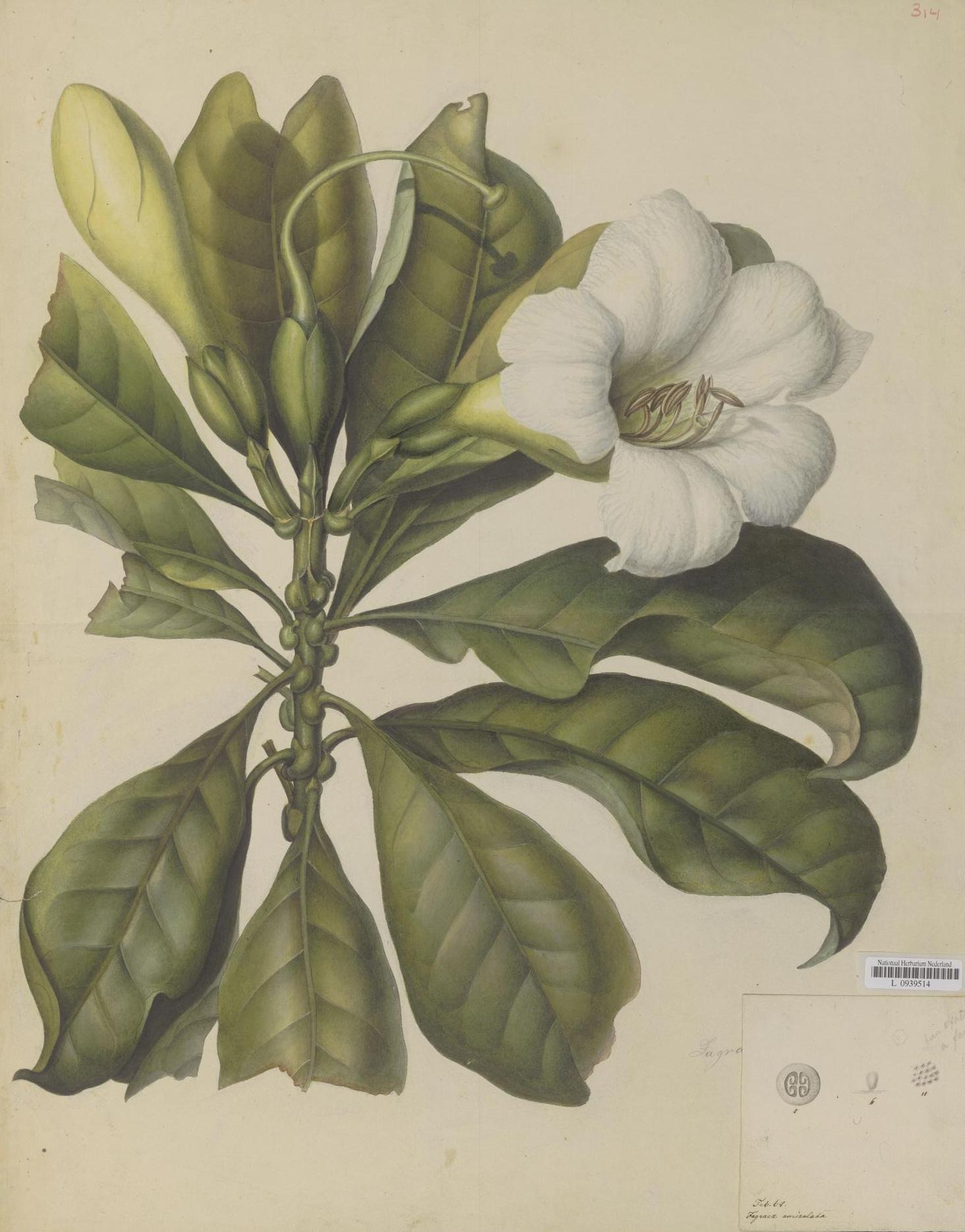

Conservation status
- Least Concern (IUCN 3.1)

Scientific classification
- Kingdom: Plantae
- Clade: Tracheophytes
- Clade: Angiosperms
- Clade: Eudicots
- Clade: Asterids
- Order: Gentianales
- Family: Gentianaceae
- Genus: Fagraea
- Species: F. auriculata

Binomial name
- Fagraea auriculata Jack

Synonyms
- Willughbeia auriculata (Jack) Spreng.

= Fagraea auriculata =

Species of flowering plant

Fagraea auriculata is a species of bush or semi-liana in the family Gentianaceae, formerly in the family Loganiaceae. It can be found in Indo-China and Malesia (where it may be called bira-bira); in Viet Nam it is called trai tai. It is noted for its huge, white, trumpet-shaped flowers; up to 30 cm (12 in) in both length and width. These flowers, the largest produced by any vine, are made of tissue up to 6 mm thick. The size, colour, heavy construction and the fact that they have a musty odour suggest that bats are important pollinators. The leaves are Magnolia-like in size and shape.

== Subspecies ==
The Catalogue of Life listed two subspecies, but these are not considered distinct by Plants of the World Online

- F. auriculata subsp. auriculata
- F. auriculata subsp. parviflora
