= Grace Greylock Niles =

American botanist, author, and artist

- Born: Grace Stoddard Niles; December 9, 1864; Pownal, Vermont
- Died: June 9, 1943 (aged 78); Brattleboro, Vermont
- Scientific career
- Fields: Botany
- Author abbrev. (botany): G.G.Niles

Grace Greylock Niles (1864-1943) was an American botanist, writer, and artist.

== Biography ==
Born as Grace Stoddard Niles, she attended Pownal schools and later a private school, which might have been in Herkimer, New York. She returned to Pownal to teach school and to pursue a writing career. In 1902, she published The Origin of Plant Names, adopting Greylock as her middle name (from Mount Greylock and Chief Gray Lock). In 1904, she published Bog-trotting for Orchids with her own illustrations. She continued to publish articles on local history and nature.

She moved to New York City around 1910, to serve as a private nurse, but stuck to her geographical and name base, writing "The Greylock Park Reservation" in 1911 about the Massachusetts park just south of Pownal. The following year she published "The Hoosac Valley," followed by "The North American Cypripediums" (orchids). While she had been returning to Pownal summers, she moved back full time in 1918, at the age of 54. She settled on family land, which now belongs to The Trustees of Reservations and is called Mountain Meadow Preserve.

By 1921, her behavior became erratic, and she began harassing her neighbors. She seems to have deliberately burned down her own house. A distant relative summoned the Bennington County sheriff, who drove her to the Brattleboro Retreat. There she was incarcerated and died in 1943. Her body was buried in Pownal in the Oak Hill Cemetery.

Her name is honored by the Grace Greylock Niles Trail in the Mountain Meadow Preserve.

== Selected publications ==
=== Articles ===
- "Our Moccasin Flowers and Other Orchids at Home". The Plant World. 9 (4): 81–85. April 1906. JSTOR 43476509.
- "Through Bristol Swamp". The Plant World. 10 (4): 73–80. April 1907. JSTOR 43477766.

=== Books ===
- Bog-trotting for Orchids. New York: G. P. Putnam's Sons. 1904.
- The Hoosac Valley, Its Legends and History. New York: G. P. Putnam's Sons. 1912.
