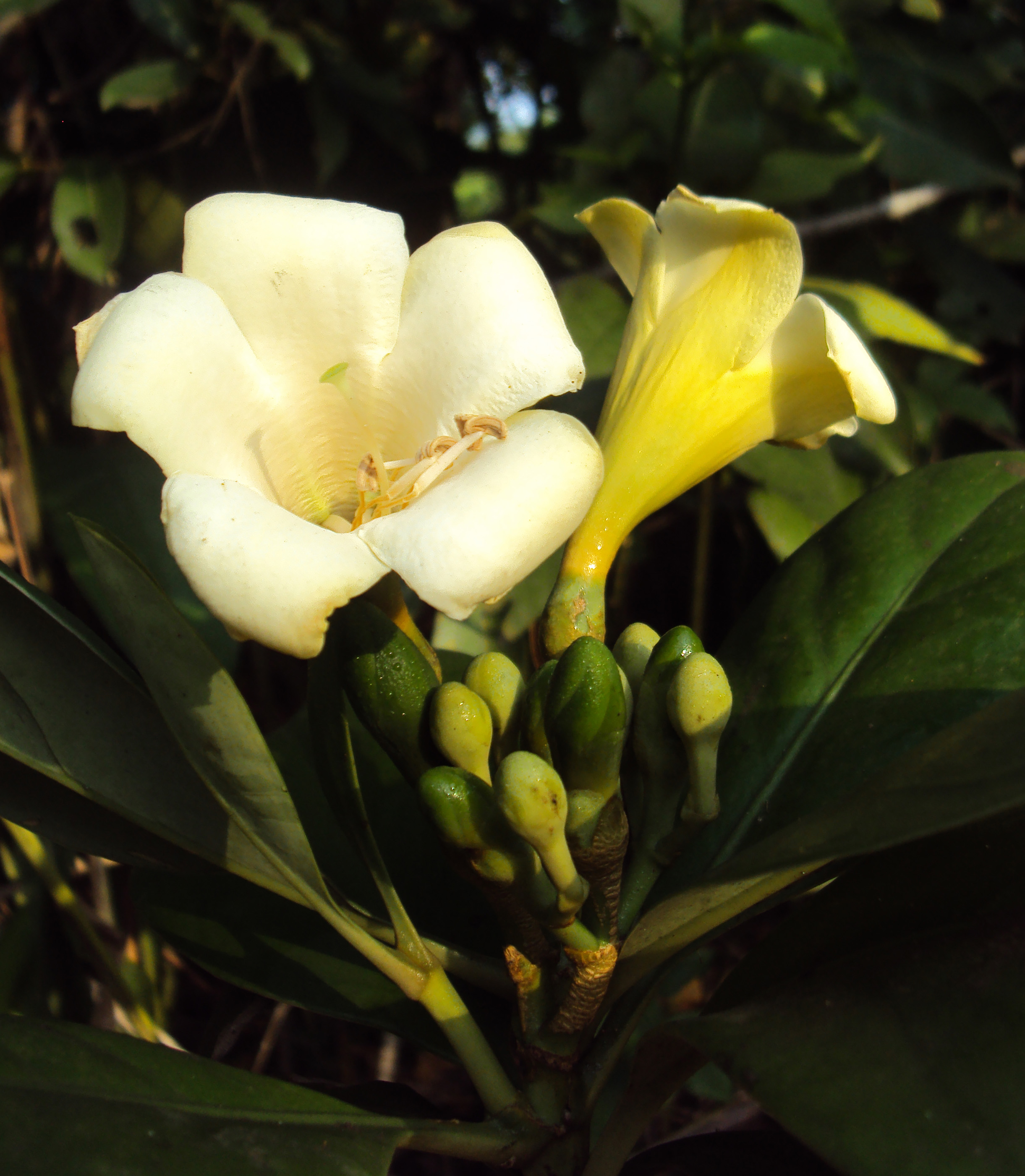
- Flower

Scientific classification
- Kingdom: Plantae
- Clade: Tracheophytes
- Clade: Angiosperms
- Clade: Eudicots
- Clade: Asterids
- Order: Gentianales
- Family: Gentianaceae
- Genus: Fagraea
- Species: F. ceilanica

Binomial name
- Fagraea ceilanica Thunb.

Synonyms
- Fagraea coromandelina Wight; Fagraea gardneri Thwaites; Fagraea khasiana Benth.; Fagraea malabarica Blume; Fagraea malabarica Wight [Illegitimate]; Fagraea obovata Wall.; Fagraea prainii Gand.; Fagraea rostrata Blume; Fagraea sasakii Hayata; Gardenia heteroclyta J.König ex Blume; Hillia longiflora hort. ex Lem.; Solandra oppositifolia Moon; Willughbeia ceilanica Spreng.; Willughbeia obovata Spreng.; Winchia cirrhifera Gardner ex Thwaites

= Fagraea ceilanica =

Species of tree

Fagraea ceilanica is a species of small tree in the family Gentianaceae growing to heights of up to 10 metres. Typical habitat is seasonal tropical forest, but it is also grown as an ornamental tree in many places in India, Indo-China and Malesia.

It has been described as "epiphytic" or a "strangler" when young, since like strangling figs (Ficus) its seeds germinate in cracks and branch joints of living tree trunks from where the young plants' roots grow around the trunk down to the ground, using the tree as support but without killing it. Occasionally flowering Fagraea ceilanica bushes are seen high up on tree trunks, remaining there as epiphytes. It is also recorded as a lithophyte growing on rocks and rock faces.

== Description ==
Leaves

are fleshy, shiny and typically lanceolate, 100-180 x 50–80 mm, with a petiole to 25 mm long.

The inflorescence

is terminal or axillary, few-flowered (see illustration). Flowers are 60–80 mm cream/white typically in March–August. The calyx is 5-lobed each approx. 8 mm long. The funnel-shaped corolla is 40–50 mm long with five broad lobes, twisted to right, and 5 adnate stamens are attached to base. A capitate stigma is attached to the ovary, which is 2-celled and containing many ovules in each.

Fruiting

is typically in August–November; structurally they are shiny berries (see illustration): 20-40 x 15–30 mm and containing many seeds.

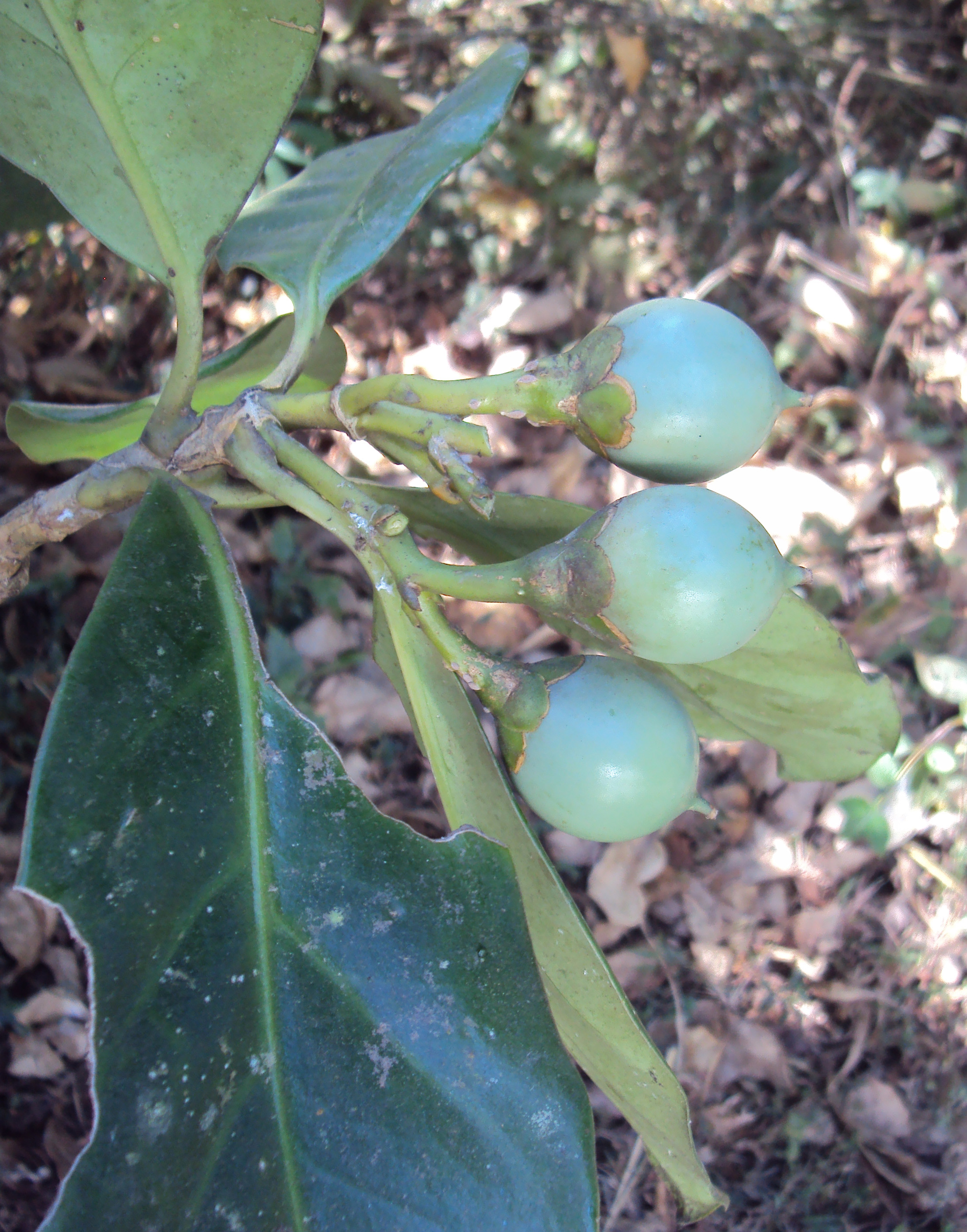
Fruits
