= Allium rouyi =

Conservation status
- Least Concern (IUCN 3.1)

Scientific classification
- Kingdom: Plantae
- Clade: Tracheophytes
- Clade: Angiosperms
- Clade: Monocots
- Order: Asparagales
- Family: Amaryllidaceae
- Subfamily: Allioideae
- Genus: Allium
- Species: A. rouyi

Binomial name
- Allium rouyi Gaut.

Species of flowering plant

Allium rouyi, is a species of plant which is endemic to Spain. Its natural habitats are Mediterranean-type shrubby vegetation and rocky areas.

Though it had been thought to be an extinct species, a population of the plant was rediscovered in 1995, from which the somatic chromosome number and detailed chromosome morphology were presented. Using this karyological data, relationships between Allium rouyi and allied species were discussed.

Following this discovery, Allium rouyi was considered as critically endangered; however, recent research has proved that A. chrysonemum Stearn and A. reconditum Pastor, Valdés & Muñoz are synonyms with A. rouyi, and therefore, distribution of this species extends throughout the south of the Iberian Peninsula.
