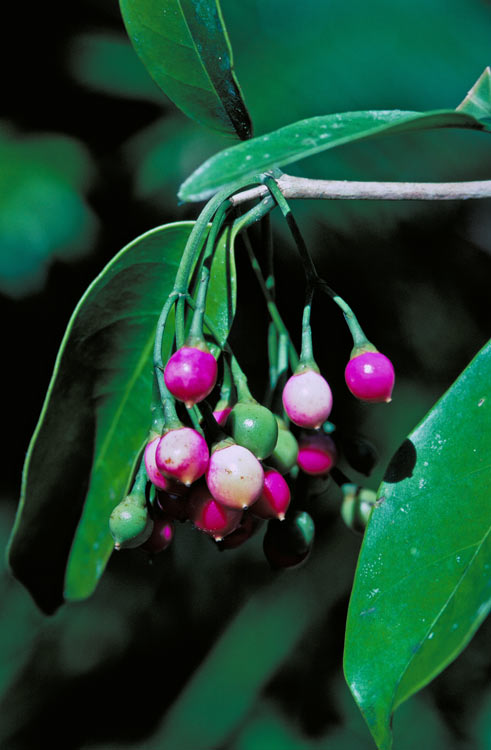
- Fruit and foliage

Conservation status
- Least Concern (NCA)

Scientific classification
- Kingdom: Plantae
- Clade: Tracheophytes
- Clade: Angiosperms
- Clade: Eudicots
- Clade: Asterids
- Order: Gentianales
- Family: Gentianaceae
- Genus: Fagraea
- Species: F. fagraeacea

Binomial name
- Fagraea fagraeacea (F.Muell.) Druce

Synonyms
- Gardneria fagraeacea F.Muell.; Fagraea muelleri Benth.

= Fagraea fagraeacea =

Yellowheart

Species of flowering plant

Fagraea fagraeacea, commonly known as yellowheart or pink jitta, is a plant in the gentian family Gentianaceae which is native to New Guinea and Queensland.

== Description ==
Yellowheart is a shrub or small tree that will grow to between 5 and 20 m (16 and 66 ft) high. The trunk has a plaited appearance and may be buttressed. The simple leaves are held on petioles up to 2.7 cm (1.1 in) long, the blades are usually elliptic, but may be ovate or obovate. They measure up to 10 cm (3.9 in) long and 4.5 cm (1.8 in) wide, are somewhat rounded at the base (cuneate) and have a narrow elongated "drip tip" (acuminate). The lateral veins are usually indistinct.

The inflorescence is a panicle produced at the end of the branches with 15 to 30 flowers, or sometimes more. The fragrant tubular flowers have a green calyx about 4 mm (0.2 in) long, 5 white or cream petals fused into a tube about 8 to 20 mm (0.3 to 0.8 in) long, and lobes about 10 mm (0.4 in) long. The stamens are inserted in the upper half of the tube, the style is about 30 mm (1.2 in) long.

The white, cream or pink fruit is, botanical terms, a berry measuring about 15 mm (0.6 in) long by 10 mm (0.4 in) wide, containing several brown seeds in a white pulp.

== Taxonomy ==
Fagraea fagraeacea was originally described as Gardneria fagraeacea by the Victorian government botanist Ferdinand von Mueller, and published in 1868 in his massive work Fragmenta phytographiæ Australiæ. Mueller based his description on material from Rockingham Bay in north Queensland (In silvis ad sinum Rockingham's Bay), which was provided to him by the plant collector John Dallachy.

In 1916 the English botanist George Claridge Druce reviewed a large number of newly named Australian and African plants that he considered had not been named in accordance with the rules of botanical nomenclature that existed at the time. As a result of this work he gave this species the new combination Fagraea fagraeacea, which was published in the 1916 report to the Botanical Society and Exchange Club of the British Isles in 1917.

== Distribution and habitat ==
The natural range of this species is coastal and sub-coastal ranges of northeast Queensland, from around Rossville south to Paluma. It inhabits well developed rainforest often on granite substrates, at altitudes from about 300 m (980 ft) to 1,350 m (4,430 ft).

=== Endemicity ===
Both Australian Tropical Rainforest Plants and Flora of Australia treats Fagraea fagraeacea as endemic to Queensland, however, there is also a single collection of this species from Normanby Island in Papua New Guinea. The collection was made in 1977 but wasn't identified until 1992.

== Conservation ==
This species is listed by the Queensland Department of Environment and Science as least concern. As of 24 January 2024, it has not been assessed by the International Union for Conservation of Nature (IUCN).

== Ecology ==
The fruit of this species is eaten by golden bowerbirds (Prionodura newtoniana) and spotted catbirds (Ailuroedus maculosus). Eastern whipbirds (Psophodes olivaceus), which are insectivores, have been observed inspecting the fruit of the yellowheart and eating what was presumed to be insect larvae that it found inside them.

== Gallery ==
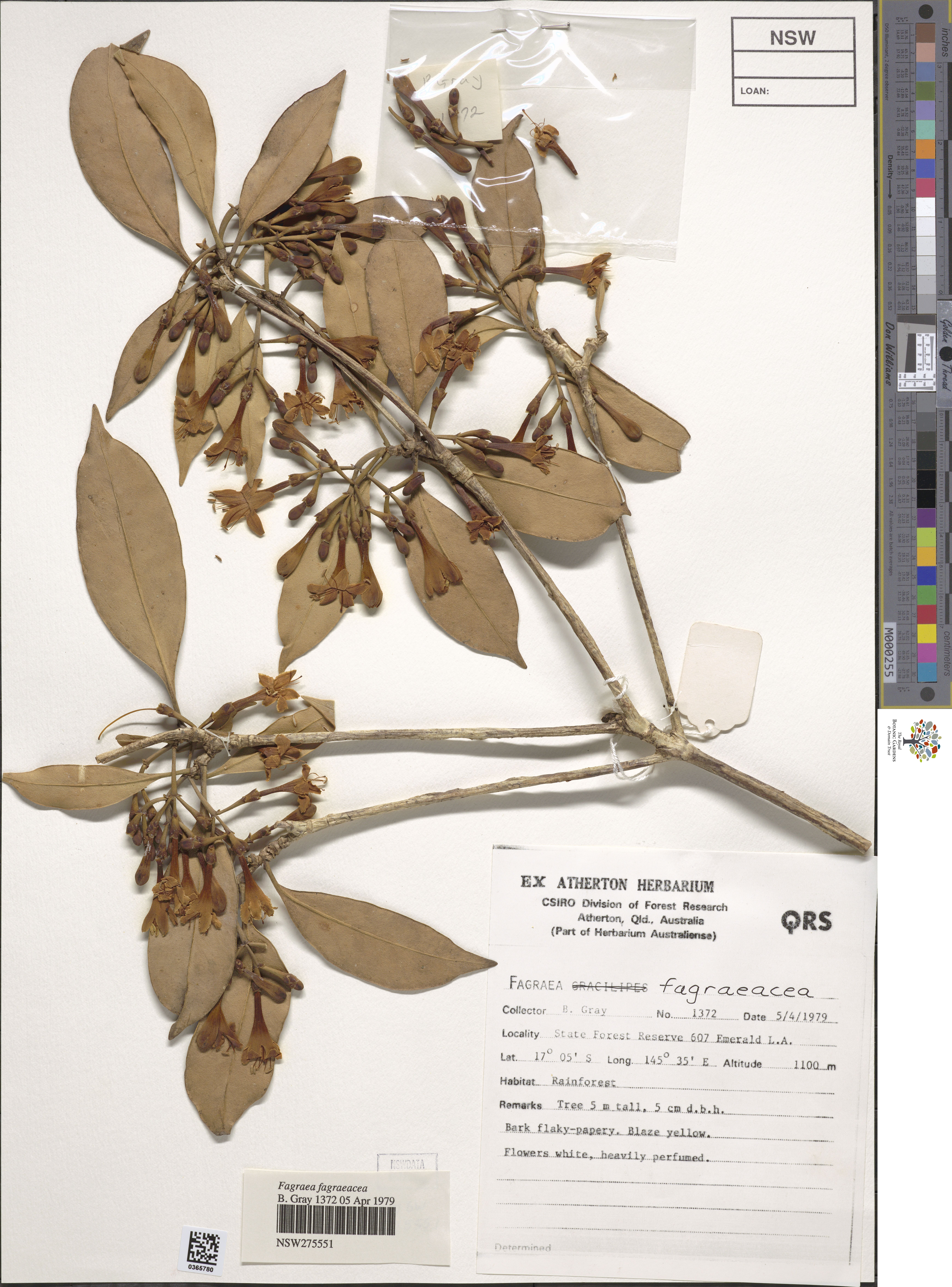
Herbarum specimen

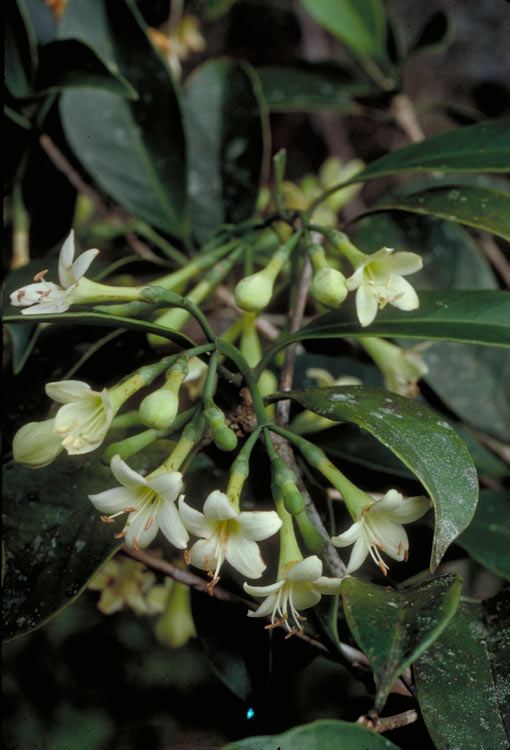
Flowers

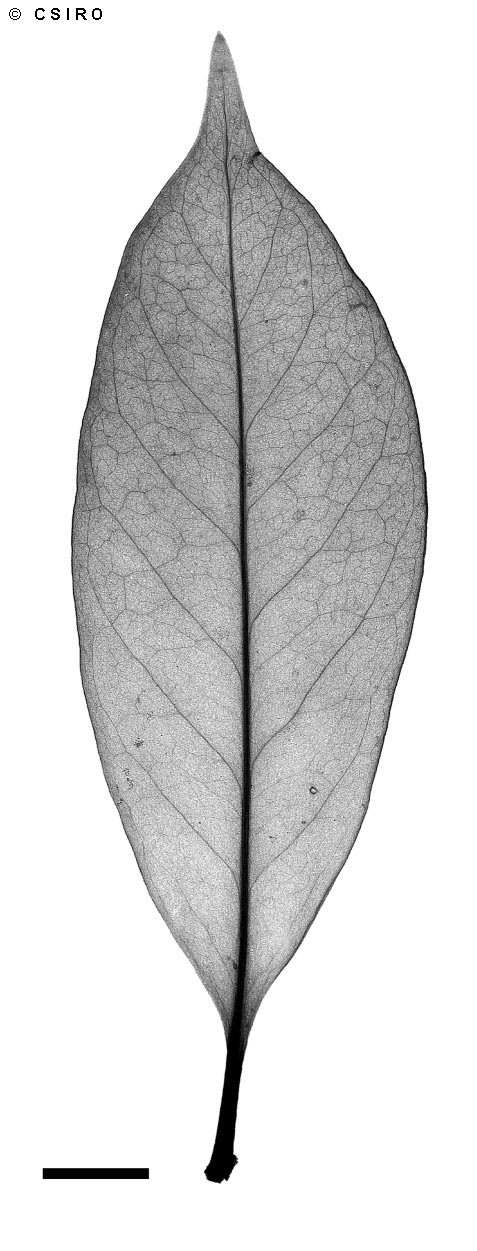
X-ray of leaf

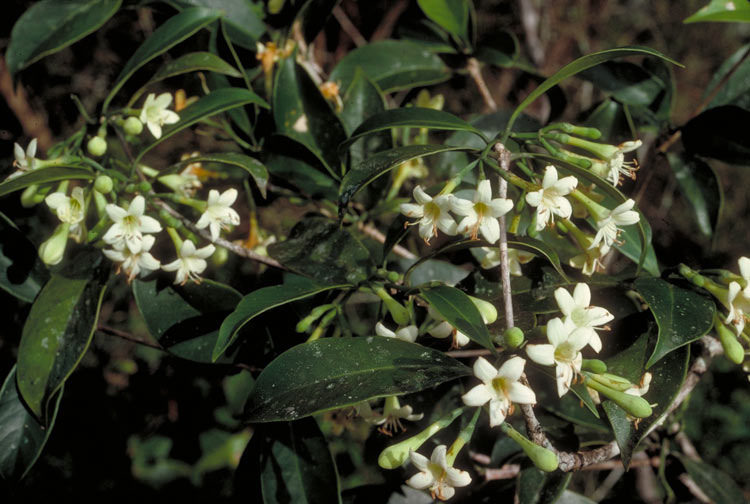
Flowers and foliage

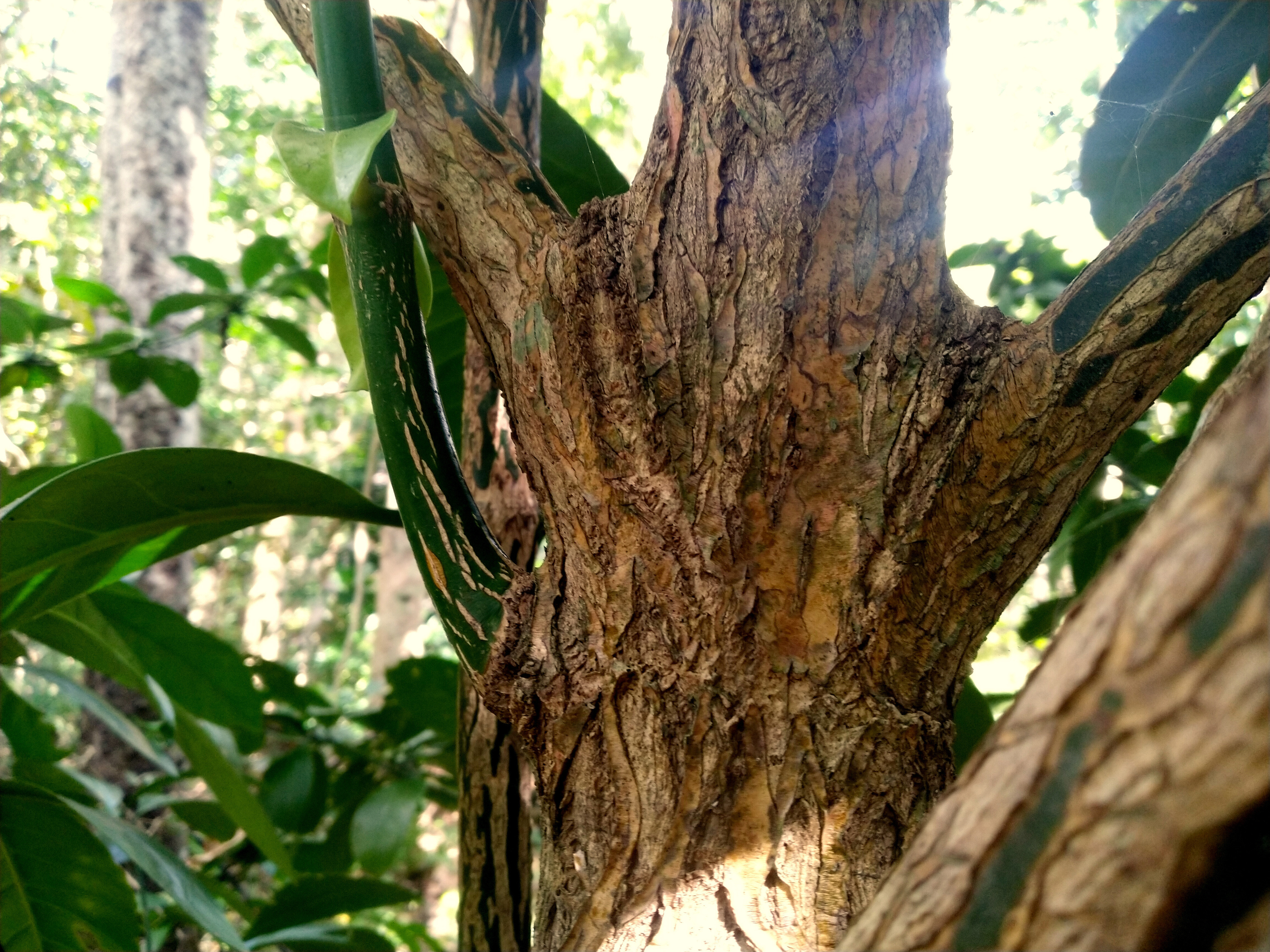
Trunk of F. cambagei, which has a similar plaited appearance to F. fagraeacea
