= Fagraea carstensensis =

Conservation status
- Data Deficient (IUCN 3.1)

Scientific classification
- Kingdom: Plantae
- Clade: Tracheophytes
- Clade: Angiosperms
- Clade: Eudicots
- Clade: Asterids
- Order: Gentianales
- Family: Gentianaceae
- Genus: Fagraea
- Species: F. carstensensis

Binomial name
- Fagraea carstensensis Wernham

Species of plant

Fagraea carstensensis is a species of flowering plant in the family Gentianaceae. It is a shrub or tree endemic to Western New Guinea, the Indonesian half of the island of New Guinea. It grows in lowland rain forest from 200 to 860 metres elevation. It is not well known, having been collected just twice.
