= Fagraea gracilipes =

Conservation status
- Near Threatened (IUCN 3.1)

Scientific classification
- Kingdom: Plantae
- Clade: Tracheophytes
- Clade: Angiosperms
- Clade: Eudicots
- Clade: Asterids
- Order: Gentianales
- Family: Gentianaceae
- Genus: Fagraea
- Species: F. gracilipes

Binomial name
- Fagraea gracilipes A.Gray

Synonyms
- Fagraea amabilis S.Moore; Fagraea cambagei Domin; Fagraea dasyantha Gilg & Gilg-Ben. Fagraea dolichopoda Gilg & Gilg-Ben. Fagraea elata Merr. & L.M.Perry; Fagraea fagraeacea (F.Muell.) Druce; Fagraea obtusifolia Merr. & L.M.Perry; Fagraea viridiflora Seem. Gardneria fagraeacea F.Muell.

Species of plant

Fagraea gracilipes is a species of flowering plant in the family Gentianaceae. It is endemic to Fiji, where it is known from only four of the islands. It is harvested for its valuable wood. In Fiji, it is threatened by overexploitation and the destruction by development of its coastal habitat.
