= Georges Rouy =

French botanist (1851-1924)

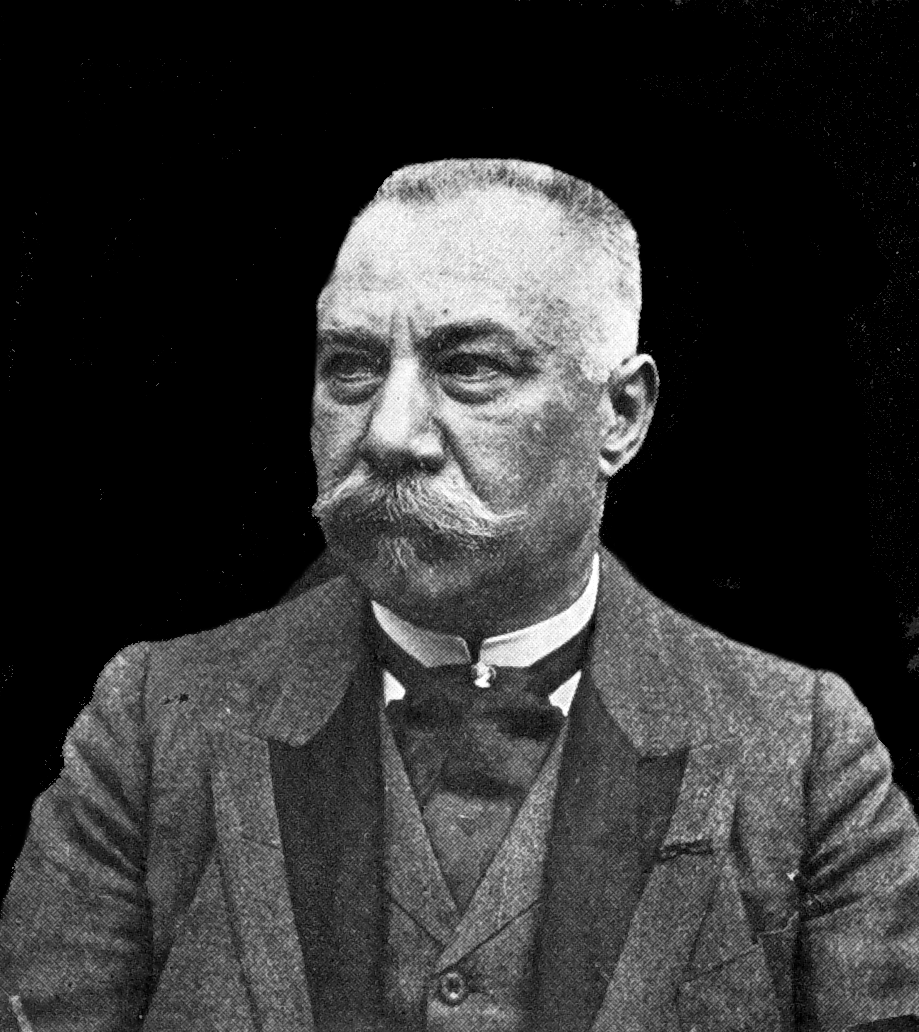
Georges Rouy

Georges Rouy (2 December 1851, Paris – 25 December 1924, Asnières-sur-Seine) was a French botanist who was among the first to identify infraspecific (i.e., below the level of species) taxa, including: subspecies, varieties, and forms.

== Published works ==
With Julien Foucaud and others, he was author of the Flore de France; ou, Description des plantes qui croissent spontanément en France, en Corse et en Alsace-Lorraine (Flora of France; descriptions of plants that are native to France, Corsica and Alsace-Lorraine, published in 14 volumes from 1893 to 1913. His other principal works include:

- Excursion botanique en Espagne, Spanien Florenwerke, 1881 - Botanical excursion in Spain.
- Atlas iconographique des plantes rares de France et de Corse, 1897 - Iconographic atlas of rare plants native to France and Corsica.
- Revue de botanique systématique et de géographie botanique, (1903, 1904) - Botanical systematics and phytogeography.
- Conspectus de la Flore de France, ou Catalogue général des espèces, sous-espèces, races, variétés, sous-variétés et formes hybrides contenues dans la "Flore de France", P. Lechevalier, 1927 (with Henri Lecomte) - Overview of the "Flore de France".

== Taxa ==
Rouy was the binomial author of many botanical species. In 1901 the genus Rouya was named in his honor by Auguste-Henri de Coincy. His name is also associated with plants having the specific epithets of rouyi, rouyana and rouyanum, some examples being: Allium rouyi, Armeria rouyana, and Clinopodium rouyanum.
