= Utania racemosa =

Scientific classification
- Kingdom: Plantae
- Clade: Tracheophytes
- Clade: Angiosperms
- Clade: Eudicots
- Clade: Asterids
- Order: Gentianales
- Family: Gentianaceae
- Genus: Utania
- Species: U. racemosa

Binomial name
- Utania racemosa (Jack) Sugumaran

Synonyms
- Fagraea malayana Mart.; Fagraea racemosa Jack; Fagraea thwaitesii F.Muell.

Species of flowering plant

Utania racemosa is a species of flowering plant in the family Gentianaceae. It occurs in Southeast Asia from Sumatera in Indonesia to the Andaman Islands in India. Its wood is used for timber and fuel.

== Description ==
It is a shrub or small tree that grows usually 3-6m tall, occasionally to 15 m. The trunk measures up to 18 cm in diameter, with smooth to slightly flaky or fissured bark. The leaves are dark green, glossy and leathery, elliptic-ovate to elliptic-lanceolate, 13 to 25 cm long and 6 to 13 cm wide.

White to cream-colored flowers, often turning yellow or pale orange, flowers, 13 to 15 mm long and 15–20 mm in diameter, are grouped in terminal panicles. In northeastern Thailand's Bung Khong Long Non-Hunting Area (Bueng Khong Long District), flowers occur from April to June.

The fruit is oval glabrous berry with beaked apex and numerous seeds, 10 to 12 mm long and 9 to 10 mm in diameter; it is similar to a coffee berry.

Features that distinguish this species from other Utania species are: rachis in distal half of flower-bearing part of inflorescence and infructescence noticeably thicker than proximal rachis and peduncle; above basal 1–2 tiers, flowering and fruiting tiers usually close-spaced, without clearly visible rachis lengths between tiers; lobes of calyx clasp tightly corolla or fruit base in dried specimens.

== Distribution ==
The tree is found from Sumatera in Indonesia to Peninsular Malaysia, Thailand, Cambodia, Vietnam, Laos, Myanmar and the Andaman Islands.

== Habitat ==
The plant grows in seasonal forest and tropical evergreen lowland rainforest, including secondary forest. In Cambodia it is described as growing in dense forests on sandy or on clay soils at elevations of between 0 and 2000m. In the unusual evergreen freshwater swamp forests known as choam in Khmer, occurring in Stung Treng Province, northeast Cambodia, Utania racemosa occurs as a rare understorey tree in permanently and seasonally inundated areas.

== Vernacular names ==
In Khmer, the plant is known by a variety of names: prôhu:t tük; tatraw tük; and häng tük, and changka trong.

In Malay, it is known as sepuleh meaning "restorer". It is also called kopi hutan meaning "forest coffee" because of the shape of its fruits.

== Uses ==
The wood of the Utania racemosa is used for construction and as firewood in Cambodia. In Thailand the wood is also used for construction, but the trunk is also used to make chopping-blocks and the flowers are used to worship images of Buddha and offer to monks.

Malay people make a special drink from its leaves to treat fevers and rheumatism.

== History ==
M. Suguraman, botanist in Malaysia, transferred this species to Utania in the journal Plant Ecology and Evolution (147(2): 220) in 2014. Suguraman and K.M. Wong (botanist from Singapore) have worked extensively on Gentianaceae.
