= Mountain Meadow Preserve =

Protected area in Massachusetts and Vermont, United States

- Interactive map of Mountain Meadow Preserve
- Location: United States
- Coordinates: 42.73853°N 73.20756°W
- Established: 1998
- Operator: The Trustees of Reservations
- Website: Mountain Meadow Preserve

Mountain Meadow Preserve is a 180-acre (73 ha) open space preserve located in the Berkshires and Green Mountains of northwest Massachusetts and adjacent Vermont in the towns of Williamstown and Pownal. The property, acquired in 1998 by the land conservation non-profit organization The Trustees of Reservations, includes highland meadows, wetlands, forested hills, and 4 miles (6.4 km) of trails.

Located on Mason Hill (a sub-peak of The Dome), the preserve is open to hiking, cross-country skiing, and similar passive pursuits. Views from the property include Mount Greylock and the Taconic Mountains to the west. Trailheads are located on Mason Road in Williamstown and White Oaks Road in Pownal.

== History ==
Mountain Meadow Preserve was given to the Trustees of Reservations in 1998 by Pamela B. Weatherbee. Additional lands were purchased in 2000.
