= Jonas Theodor Fagraeus =

Swedish medical doctor and botanist

Jonas Theodor Fagraeus (1729–1797) was a Swedish medical doctor and botanist.
