= Pyotr Gorovoy =

Russian botanist (1936–2026)

- Пётр Горовой
- Born: 13 December 1936; Shkotovo, Far Eastern Krai, Russian SFSR, Soviet Union
- Died: 24 June 2026 (aged 89)
- Education: Blagoveshchensk State Pedagogical University
- Occupation: Botanist

Pyotr Grigoryevich Gorovoy (Russian: Пётр Григорьевич Горовой; 13 December 1936 – 24 June 2026) was a Russian botanist. A member of the Russian Academy of Sciences, he was a recipient of the Order of Honour.

Gorovoy died on 24 June 2026, at the age of 89.
