= Casimir Arvet-Touvet =

French botanist

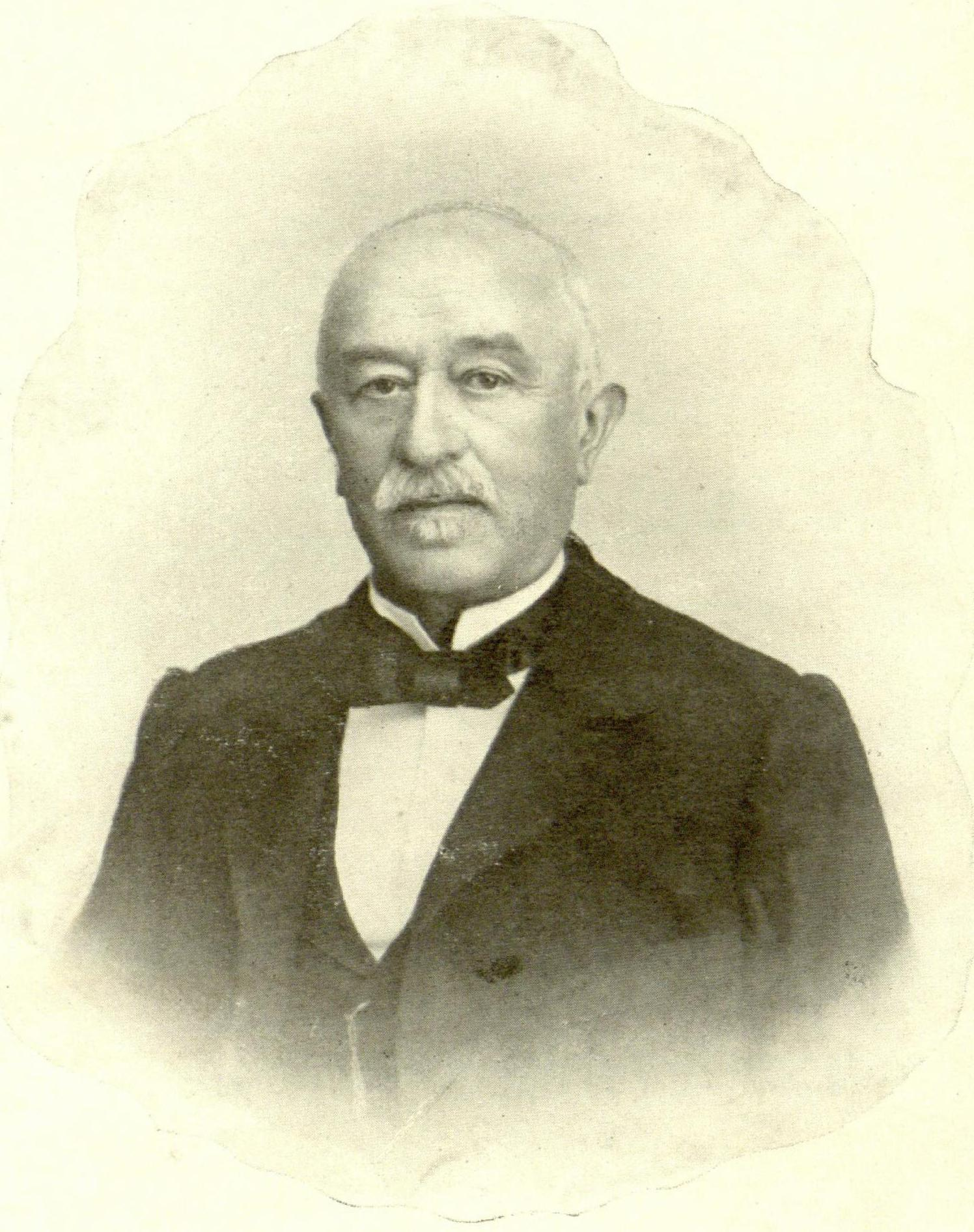
Casimir Arvet-Touvet (1841–1913)

Jean-Maurice Casimir Arvet-Touvet (1841–1913) was a French botanist born in Gières.

His early botanical investigations involved species native to Dauphiné, publishing in 1871 Essai sur les plantes du Dauphiné. Subsequently, he devoted his energies to research of the genus Hieracium (hawkweed). With his friend, Marie Clément Gaston Gautier (1841–1911), he conducted studies of Hieracium found in the Pyrenees and the Iberian Peninsula. With Gautier he distributed two exsiccata series of the genus: Hieraciotheca Gallica and Hieraciotheca Hispanica.

During the last few years of his life he was involved with publication of the exsiccata booklets Hieraciorum praesertim Galliae et Hispaniae catalogus systematicus.

== Selected publications ==
- Essai sur les plantes du Dauphiné : diagnosis specierum novarum vel dubio praeditarum, 1871.
- Hieracium des Alpes françaises ou occidentales de l'Europe. Lyon, Genève, Bâle : Henri George lib.; Paris : J. Lechevalier, 1888.
- Hieraciotheca gallica et hispanica in collaboration with Gaston Gautier. Exsiccata en 20 fascicules, 1908.
- Hieraciorum praesertim Galliae et Hispaniae catalogus systematicus. Paris, Lib. des Sc. nat. Léon Lhomme, 1913.
