= Franz Goeschke =

German horticulturist

Franz Goeschke (German spelling, Göschke); (1844 – 1912) was a German horticulturist who was director of horticulture and head of the Royal Prussian Pomological Institute in Proskau. His father, Gottlieb Göschke (1818-1898), was also a noted horticulturalist.

Franz Göschke was a leading authority of strawberry cultivation. He is credited with creating around thirty new varieties of strawberry, including the once popular Erdbeere Königin Luise (Queen Luise strawberry), a variety he first introduced in 1905.

== Selected publications ==
- Die rationelle Spargelzucht (Rational asparagus cultivation), 1882.
- Die Haselnuss, ihre Arten und ihre Kultur (Hazelnuts, types and cultivars), 1885.
- Das Buch der Erdbeeren (The book of strawberries), 2nd edition 1888.
- Der Hausgarten auf dem Lande (The garden in the countryside), 1899.
- Einfassungspflanzen (Edging plants), 1900.
- Einträgliche Spargelzucht (Lucrative asparagus cultivation), 1904.
- The hazel, 1922; English translation of works by Göschke and Karl Koch.
