= Marie Clément Gaston Gautier =

French botanist and agriculturalist

Marie Clément Gaston Gautier (10 April 1841 – 7 October 1911) was a French botanist and agriculturalist.

== Biography ==
Gautier was born in Narbonne, and collected plants in the vicinity of his native city as well as in the Corbières Massif and the Pyrenees. These specimens became an important part of an impressive herbarium that he had amassed during his career. As an agriculturalist, he was at the forefront of issues that included swamp drainage, reclamation of barren land, and modern viticultural practices.

== Works ==
Among his published works were Catalogue raisonné de la flore des Pyrénées-Orientales (Catalogue raisonné on the flora of Pyrénées-Orientales, 1898) and Catalogue de la flore des Corbières (Catalog on the flora of the Corbières, being published posthumously in 1912). Other noted works by Gautier include:

- Rapport sur les herborisations dans les environs de Narbonne, instituées par le Comice agricole de l'arrondissement de Narbonne 1876 - Report on herborizations near Narbonne, etc.
- Hieraciotheca Gallica et Hispanica (with Casimir Arvet-Touvet 1841–1913), exsiccatae: twenty fascicles between 1897 and 1908., see also treatment as two exsiccata series: Hieraciotheca Gallica and Hieraciotheca Hispanica.
