= Charlotte Gilg-Benedict =

German botanist (1872–1965)

Charlotte Gilg-Benedict (1872–1965) was a German botanist noted for studying Capparaceae. She co-authored several studies with Ernest Friedrich Gilg (cited as Gilg & Benedict), whom she later married.

The standard author abbreviation Gilg-Ben. is used to indicate this person as the author when citing a botanical name.
