= Julien Foucaud =

French botanist

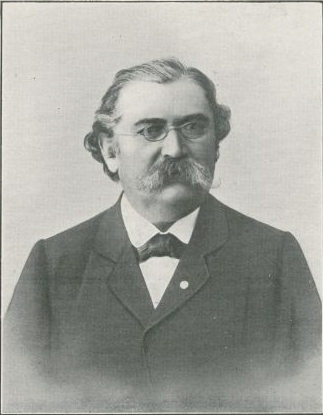

Julien Foucaud (2 July 1847, in Saint-Clément – 26 April 1904, in Rochefort) was a French botanist.

From 1867 to 1885, he was an assistant teacher and teacher in several schools in the department of Charente-Maritime. In February 1885, he was appointed director of the naval botanical garden in Rochefort.

In February 1878, he became a member of the Société Botanique de France. Taxa with the specific epithet of foucaudii are named in his honor. In collaboration with Georges Rouy, he described numerous plant species.

== Selected works ==
- Flore de l'ouest de la France; ou, Description des plantes qui croissent spontanément dans les départements de: Charente-Inférieure, Deux-Sèvres, Vendée, Loire-Inférieure, Morbihan, Finistère, Côtes-du-Nord, Ille-et-Vilaine (1886), with James Lloyd – Flora of western France, description of plants native to Charente-Inférieure, Deux-Sèvres, Vendée, Loire-Inférieure, Morbihan, Finistère, Côtes-du-Nord and Ille-et-Vilaine.
- Flore de France; ou, Description des plantes qui croissent spontanément en France, en Corse et en Alsace-Lorraine (1893–1913), with Georges Rouy, Edmond Gustave Camus and Jean-Nicolas Boulay – Flora of France, descriptions of plants native to France, Corsica and Alsace-Lorraine.
- Trois semaines d'herborisations en Corse (1898), with Eugène Simon – Three weeks of herborization on Corsica.
