= List of botanists by author abbreviation (N–O) =

This is an incomplete list of botanists by their author abbreviation, which is designed for citation with the botanical names or works that they have published. This list follows that established by Brummitt & Powell (1992). Use of that list is recommended by Rec. 46A Note 1 of the International Code of Nomenclature for algae, fungi, and plants. The list is kept up to date online at The International Plant Names Index and Index Fungorum.

In some cases an "author abbreviation" consists of a full surname, while in other cases the surname is abbreviated and/or accompanied by one or more initials. There is no space between the initials and the surname (or its abbreviation).

==== Order of entries ====
The list here is maintained strictly in order of the alphabetic characters in the abbreviation; thus "A.B.Jacks." appears under "A" not "J", and is located as if the characters were "ABJACKS". Capitalization is ignored as are all non-alphabetic characters such as "." and space. Diacritical marks are also ignored, so that, e.g., "ü" is treated as if it were "u".

==== Navigation ====
Because of its length, the list is split across separate pages. All alphabetic sections can be accessed from the short table of contents; the vertical bars show the page divisions. Searching will only find an entry within a page.

== A–M ==
Contents:	A	B	C	D	E F	G	H	I J	K L	M	N O	P	Q R	S	T U V	W X Y Z

To find entries for A–M, use the table of contents above.

== N ==
Contents: Top	A	B	C	D	E F	G	H	I J	K L	M	N O	P	Q R	S	T U V	W X Y Z

- Nábělek – František Nábělek (1884–1965)
- N.A.Br. – Nellie Adalesa Brown (1876–1956)
- Naczi – Robert Francis Cox Naczi (born 1963)
- Nadeaud – Jean Nadeaud (1834–1898)
- Nadson – Georgii Adamovich Nadson (1867–1939)
- Nagam. – Hidetoshi Nagamasu (fl. 1986)
- Nägeli – Carl Nägeli (1817–1891)
- Naive – Mark Arcebal Kling Naive (fl. 2016)
- Nakai – Takenoshin Nakai (1882–1952)
- Napper – Diana Margaret Napper (1930–1972)
- Nash – George Valentine Nash (1864–1921)
- Nast – Charlotte Georgia Nast (1905–1991)
- Nasution – Rusdy E. Nasution (fl. 1977)
- Nath. – Alfred Gabriel Nathorst (1850–1921)
- Naudin – Charles Victor Naudin (1815–1899)
- Navashin – Sergei Gavrilovich Navashin (1857–1930)
- Náves – Andrés Náves (1839–1910)
- N.A.Wakef. – Norman Arthur Wakefield (1918–1972)
- N.Balach. – Natesan Balachandran (born 1965)
- N.Busch – Nicolaĭ Adolfowitsch Busch (1869–1941)
- N.B.Ward – Nathaniel Bagshaw Ward (1791–1868)
- N.Cardoso – Nelsa Cardoso (born 1970)
- N.C.Hend. – Norlan C. Henderson (1915–2016)
- N.C.Melvin – Norman C. Melvin (fl. 1977)
- N.C.W.Beadle – Noel Charles William Beadle (1914–1998)
- N.D.Atwood – Nephi Duane Atwood (1938–2021)
- N.E.Br. – Nicholas Edward Brown (1849–1934)
- Neck. – Noel Martin Joseph de Necker (1730–1793)
- Née – Luis Née (1734–1807)
- Nees – Christian Gottfried Daniel Nees von Esenbeck (1776–1858)
- Neese – Elizabeth Chase Neese (1934–2008)
- Neger – Franz Wilhelm Neger (1868–1923)
- N.E.Gray – Netta Elizabeth Gray (1913–1970)
- Nègre – Robert Nègre (born 1924)
- N.E.Hansen – Niels Ebbesen Hansen (1866–1950)
- Nehrl. – Henry Nehrling (1853–1929)
- Neill – Patrick Neill (1776–1851)
- Neilr. – August Neilreich (1803–1871)
- Nel – Gert Cornelius Nel (1885–1950)
- Nelmes – Ernest Nelmes (1895–1959)
- Nelson – David Nelson (c.1740–1789)
- Nemoto – Kwanji Nemoto (1860–1936)
- Nerz – Joachim Nerz (fl. 1994)
- Ness – Helge Ness (1861–1928)
- Nestl. – Chrétien Géofroy Nestler (1778–1832)
- Neubert – Wilhelm Neubert (1808–1905)
- Neumann – Joseph Henri Francois Neumann (1800–1858)
- Neveu-Lem. – Maurice Neveu-Lemaire (1872–1951)
- Nevski – Sergei Arsenjevic Nevski (1908–1938)
- Newb. – John Strong Newberry (1822–1892)
- Newbould – William Williamson Newbould (1819–1886)
- Newc. – Frederick Charles Newcombe (1858–1927)
- Newman – Edward Newman (1801–1876)
- Newton – Isaac Newton (1840–1906)
- N.F.Hend. – Nellie Frater Henderson (1885–1952)
- N.F.Mattos – Nilza Fischer de Mattos (born 1931)
- N.F.Robertson – Noel Farnie Robertson (1923–1999)
- Ng – Francis S.P. Ng (born 1940)
- Ngamr. – Chatchai Ngamriabsakul (fl. 2000)
- N.Garcia – Núria Garcia Jacas (born 1961), also "Núria Garcia-Jacas"
- Nge – Francis Jason Nge (born 1994)
- N.Gibson – Neil Gibson (born 1957)
- N.G.Marchant – Neville Graeme Marchant (born 1939)
- N.G.Mill. – Norton George Miller (1942–2011)
- N.G.Walsh – Neville Grant Walsh (born 1956)
- N.Hallé – Nicolas Hallé (1927–2017)
- N.H.F.Desp. – Narcisse Henri François Desportes (1776–1856)
- N.H.Holmgren – Noel Herman Holmgren (born 1937)
- N.H.Williams – Norris Hagan Williams (born 1943)
- Nicholls – William Henry Nicholls (1885–1951)
- Nichols – George Elwood Nichols (1882–1939)
- Nickrent – Daniel L. Nickrent (born 1956)
- Nicolai – Ernst August Nicolai (1800–1874)
- Nicolson – Dan Henry Nicolson (1933–2016)
- Nicora – Elisa G. Nicora (1912–2001)
- Nied. – Franz Josef Niedenzu (1857–1937)
- Niederle – Josef Niederle (fl. 2003)
- Nielsen – Peter Nielsen (1829–1897)
- Nieuwenh. – A.W. Nieuwenhuis (fl. 1908)
- Nieuwl. – Julius Aloysius Arthur Nieuwland (1878–1936)
- Niketić – Marjan Niketić (born 1961)
- Nikitin – Sergei Nikolaevic Nikitin (1850–1909)
- Nikitina – Ennafa Vasilievna Nikitina (1893–1976)
- Nir – Mark Anthony Nir (1935–2019)
- Nitsche – Walter Nitsche (1883–)
- Nitschke – Theodor Rudolph Joseph Nitschke (1834–1883)
- Nixon – Kevin C. Nixon (born 1953)
- N.Jacobsen – Niels Henning Günther Jacobsen (born 1941)
- N.Jardine – Nick Jardine (born 1943)
- N.J.Chung – Nian June Chung (fl. 1977)
- N.Kilian – Norbert Kilian (born 1957)
- N.L.Alcock – Nora Lilian Alcock (c.1875–1972)
- N.Lund – Nils (Nicolai) Lund (1814–1847)
- N.Mukh. – Nirmalendu Mukherjee (fl. 1967–75)
- N.N.Tran – Ngoc Ninh Tran (born 1943)
- Nob.Tanaka – Nobuyuki Tanaka (fl. 2000)
- Nocca – Domenico Nocca (1758–1841)
- Noë – Friedrich Wilhelm Noë (1798–1858)
- Noegg. – Johann Jakob Nöggerath (Jacob Noeggerath) (1788–1877)
- Noerdl. (also Nördl.) – Hermann Noerdlinger (1818–1897)
- Nois. – Louis Claude Noisette (1772–1849)
- Noltie – Henry John Noltie (born 1957)
- Noot. – Hans Peter Nooteboom (1934–2022)
- Nordal (also I.Bjørnstadt) – Inger Nordal (born 1944)
- Nordensk. – Nils Adolph Erik (von) Nordenskiöld (1832–1901)
- Nördl. (also Noerdl.) – Herman von Nördlinger (1818–1897)
- Nordm. – Alexander von Nordmann (1803–1866)
- Nor-Ezzaw. – A. T. Nor-Ezzawanis (fl. 2010)
- Norl. – Nils Tycho Norlindh (1906–1995)
- Noronha – Francisco Noronha (1748–1788)
- Northr. – Alice Belle (Rich) Northrop (1864–1922)
- Norton – John Bitting Smith Norton (1872–1966)
- Nothdurft – Heinrich Wilhelm Christian Nothdurft (born 1921)
- Norup – Maria Vibe Norup (fl. 2005)
- Novák – František Antonín Novák (1892–1964)
- Novopokr. – Ivan Vassiljevich Novopokrovsky (1880–1951)
- Nowicke – Joan W. Nowicke (born 1938)
- N.P.Balakr. – Nambiyath Puthansurayil Balakrishnan (born 1935)
- N.P.Barker – Nigel P. Barker (fl. 1993)
- N.Pfeiff. – Norma Etta Pfeiffer (1889–1989)
- N.P.Pratov – N. P. Pratov (born 1934)
- N.P.Taylor – Nigel Paul Taylor (born 1956)
- N.Ramesh – N. Ramesh (fl. 2000)
- N.Robson – Norman Keith Bonner Robson (1928–2021)
- N.Rosén (also Rosenstein) – Nils Rosén von Rosenstein (1706–1773)
- N.Roux – Nisius Roux (1854–1923)
- N.Ruiz-R. – Natalia Ruiz-Rodgers (fl. 1995–7)
- N.S.Fraga – Naomi Fraga (born 1979)
- N.S.Golubk. – Nina Golubkova (1932–2009)
- N.S.Lee – Nam Sook Lee (born 1955)
- N.S.Pavlova. – N. S. Pavlova (born 1938)
- N.Streiber – Nikola Streiber (fl. 1999)
- N.Taylor – Norman Taylor (1883–1967)
- N.T.Burb. – Nancy Tyson Burbidge (1912–1977)
- N.Terracc. – Nicola Terracciano (1837–1921)
- N.T.Sauss. – Nicolas-Théodore de Saussure (1767–1845)
- Nubl. – Erwin Nubling (1876–1953)
- Nusb. – Louis Paul Gustave Alvin Nusbaumer (born 1977)
- Nutt. – Thomas Nuttall (1786–1859)
- N.W.Simmonds – Norman Willison Simmonds (1922–2002)
- N.W.Uhl – Natalie Whitford Uhl (1919–2017)
- Nyár. – Erasmus Julius Nyárády (1881–1966)
- Nyffeler – Reto Nyffeler (fl. 1992)
- Nygaard – Gunnar Nygaard (1903–2002)
- Nyholm – Elsa Cecilia Nyholm (1911–2002)
- Nyl. – (Wilhelm) William Nylander (1822–1899)
- Nyman – Carl Frederik Nyman (1820–1893)

== O ==
Contents: Top	A	B	C	D	E F	G	H	I J	K L	M	N O	P	Q R	S	T U V	W X Y Z

- Oakes – William Oakes (1799–1848)
- O.Appel – Oliver Appel (fl. 1996)
- O.B.Davies – Olive Blanche Davies (1884–1976)
- O.Berg – Otto Karl Berg (1815–1866)
- Oberm. – Anna Amelia Obermeyer (1907–2001)
- Oberpr. – Christoph Oberprieler (born 1964)
- O.Bolòs – Oriol de Bolòs (1924–2007)
- Obón – Concepción Obón (born 1959)
- O'Brien – James O'Brien (1842–1930)
- Ochoa – Carlos M. Ochoa (fl. 1952)
- Ochot. – Isaac Ochoterena (1885–1950)
- Ochse – Jacob Jonas Ochse (1891–1970)
- Ochyra – Ryszard Ochyra (born 1949)
- O.Cohen – Ofer Cohen (fl. 1995)
- O.C.Schmidt – Otto Christian Schmidt (1900–1951)
- O.Danesch – Othmar Danesch (1919–2014)
- O.Deg. – Otto Degener (1899–1988)
- O'Donell – Carlos Alberto O'Donell (1912–1954)
- O.D.Evans – Obed David Evans (1889–1975)
- Odyuo – Nripemo Odyüo (born 1970)
- Oeder – Georg Christian Oeder (1728–1791)
- O.E.Erikss. – Ove Erik Eriksson (born 1935)
- Oerst. – Anders Sandøe Ørsted (1816–1872)
- O.E.Schulz – Otto Eugen Schulz (1874–1936)
- O.F.Cook – Orator F. Cook (1867–1949)
- O.Fedtsch. – Olga Alexandrowna Fedtschenko (1845–1921)
- O.F.Müll. – Otto Friedrich Müller (1730–1784)
- O.Gruss – Olaf Gruss (born 1948)
- Ohlend. – Johann Heinrich Ohlendorff (1788-1857)
- O.Hoffm. – Karl August Otto Hoffmann (1853–1909)
- Ohi-Toma – Tetsuo Ohi-Toma (fl. 2010)
- O.H.Sarg. – Oswald Hewlett Sargent (1880–1952)
- Ohtani – Shigeru Ohtani (fl. 1961)
- O.Huber – Otto Huber (born 1944)
- Ohwi – Jisaburo Ohwi (1905–1977)
- O.J.Rich. – Olivier Jules Richard (1836–1896)
- Okamura – Kintaro Okamura (1867–1935)
- O'Kane – Steve Lawrence O'Kane (born 1956)
- Oken – Lorenz Oken (1779–1851)
- O.K.Mill. – Orson Knapp Miller, Jr. (1930–2006)
- O.Lachenaud – Olivier Lachenaud (fl. 2008)
- Olde – Peter M. Olde (born 1945)
- Oldenl. – Henrik Bernard Oldenland (c. 1663–1699)
- Oldfield – Augustus Frederick Oldfield (1820–1887)
- Oldham – Thomas Oldham (1816–1878)
- O'Leary – Martin C. O'Leary (1961–2026)
- Oliv. – Daniel Oliver (1830–1916)
- Olmstead – Richard Glenn Olmstead (born 1951)
- Olney – Stephen Thayer Olney (1812–1878)
- Oltm. – Friedrich Oltmanns (1860–1945)
- Omino – Elizabeth Omino (born 1962)
- O.Muñiz – Onaney Muñiz (1937-2002)
- Ö.Nilsson – Örjan Eric Gustaf Nilsson (born 1933)
- Onions – Agnes H. S. Onions (fl. 1966)
- Onno – Max Onno (1903–1970)
- Ooststr. – Simon Jan van Ooststroom (1906–1982)
- Opiz – Philipp Maximilian Opiz (1787–1858)
- Oppenh. – Heinz Reinhard Oppenheimer (1899–1971)
- Orange – Alan Orange (1955–2023)
- Orb. – Charles Henry Dessalines d'Orbigny (1806–1876)
- Orbán – Sándor Orbán (born 1947)
- Orchard – Anthony Edward Orchard (born 1946)
- Orcutt – Charles Russell Orcutt (1864–1929)
- Orme – Andrew E. Orme (fl. 2017)
- Ormerod – Paul Abel Ormerod (born 1969)
- Ormonde – José Eduardo Martins Ormonde (1943–2004)
- Ornduff – Robert Ornduff (1932–2000)
- O.Rosenb. – Gustaf Otto Rosenberg (1872–1948)
- Orph. – Theodoros G. Orphanides (1817–1886)
- Orr – Matthew Young Orr (1883–1953)
- Ortega – Casimiro Gómez Ortega (1740–1818)
- Ortgies – Karl Eduard Ortgies (1829–1916)
- Orthia – L. A. Orthia (fl. 2005)
- Ortmann – Anton Ortmann (1801–1861)
- Osbeck – Pehr Osbeck (1723–1805)
- Osborn – Arthur Osborn (1878–1964)
- O.Schneid. – Oskar Schneider (1841–1903)
- O.Schwarz – Otto Karl Anton Schwarz (1900–1983)
- O'Shanesy – Patrick Adams O'Shanesy (1837-1884)
- Oshio – Masayoshi Oshio (born 1937)
- Oshite – Kei Oshite (born 1919)
- Osipian – Lia Levonevna Osipian (born 1930)
- Ósk. – Ingimar Óskarsson (1892–1981)
- Osner – George Adin Osner (1888–1964)
- Osorio – Héctor Saúl Osorio Rial (1928–2016)
- Ospina – Hernandez Mariano Ospina (1934–2018)
- Ossa – José Antonio de la Ossa (died 1829)
- Osswald – Louis Osswald (1854–1918)
- Ossyczn. – V. V. Ossycznjuk (born 1918)
- Ostapko – V. M. Ostapko (born 1950)
- Osten – Cornelius Osten (1863–1936)
- Ostenf. – Carl Hansen Ostenfeld (1873–1931)
- Osterh. – George Everett Osterhout (1858–1937)
- Osterm. – Franz Ostermeyer (died 1921)
- Osterw. – Adolf Osterwalder (1872–1948)
- Osterwald – Karl Osterwald (1853–1923)
- Östman – Magnus Östman (1852–1927)
- Østrup – Ernst Vilhelm Østrup (1845–1917)
- Osvač. – Vera Osvačilová (1924–1987)
- Oterdoom – Herman John Oterdoom (1917–2013)
- Otth – Carl Adolf Otth (1803–1839)
- Otto – Christoph Friedrich Otto (1783–1856)
- Ottol. – Kornelius Johannes Willem Ottolander (1822–1887)
- Oudejans – Robertus Cornelis Hilarius Maria Oudejans (born 1943)
- Oudem. – Cornelius Anton Jan Abraham Oudemans (1825–1906)
- Oudney – Walter Oudney (1790–1824)
- Ovcz. – Pavel Nikolaevich Ovczinnikov (1903–1979)
- Overeem – Casper van Overeem (de Haas) (1893–1927)
- Owen – Maria Louisa Owen (1825–1913)
- Ownbey – Francis Marion Ownbey (1910–1974)
- O.Yano – Olga Yano (born 1946)
- O.Zacharias – Emil Otto Zacharias (1846–1916)

== P–Z ==
Contents: Top	A	B	C	D	E F	G	H	I J	K L	M	N O	P	Q R	S	T U V	W X Y Z

To find entries for P–Z, use the table of contents above.

== See also ==
- List of South African plant botanical authors
- List of botanists
- Category:Botanists
- List of Russian botanists
- List of zoologists by author abbreviation
