= Romeyn Beck Hough =

American physician and botanist

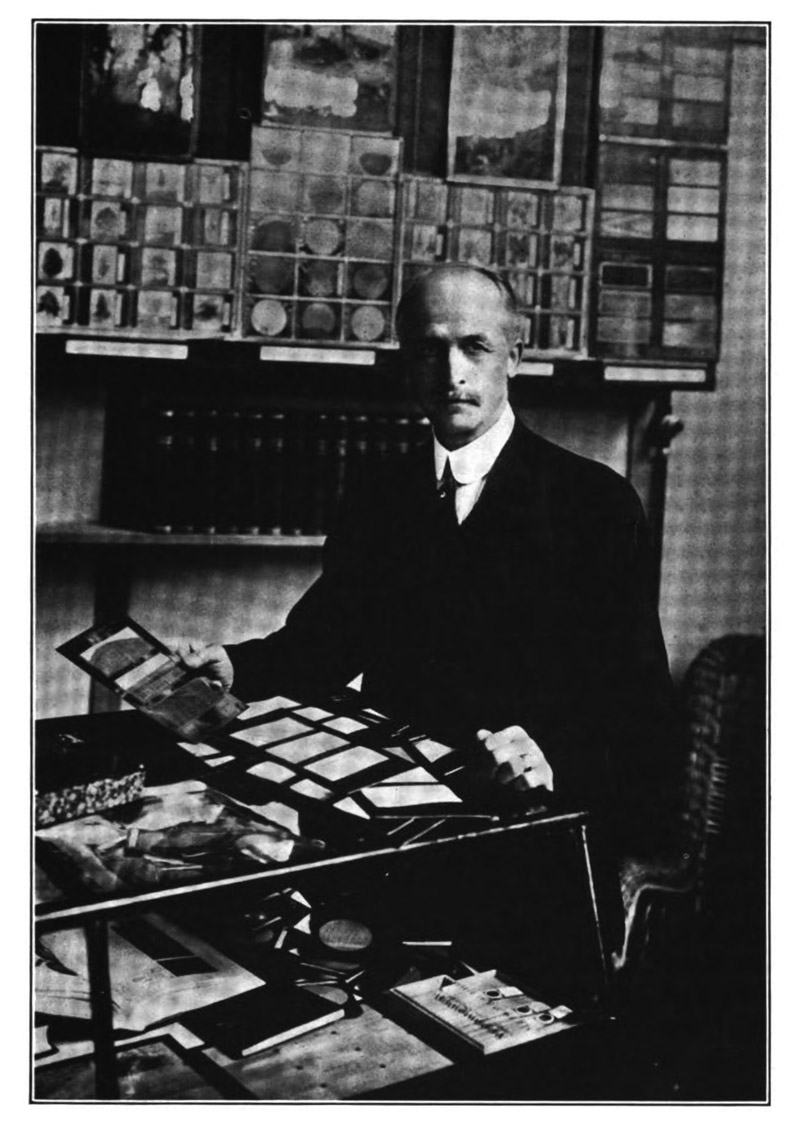
c. 1916 photograph of Romeyn Beck Hough displaying sections from American Woods. Behind are magic lantern slides.

Romeyn Beck Hough (1857–1924) was an American physician and botanist, who is best known for creating The American Woods, a 14-volume collection of wood samples from forest species across North America. His botanical work was widely acclaimed at his time.

== Life and work ==
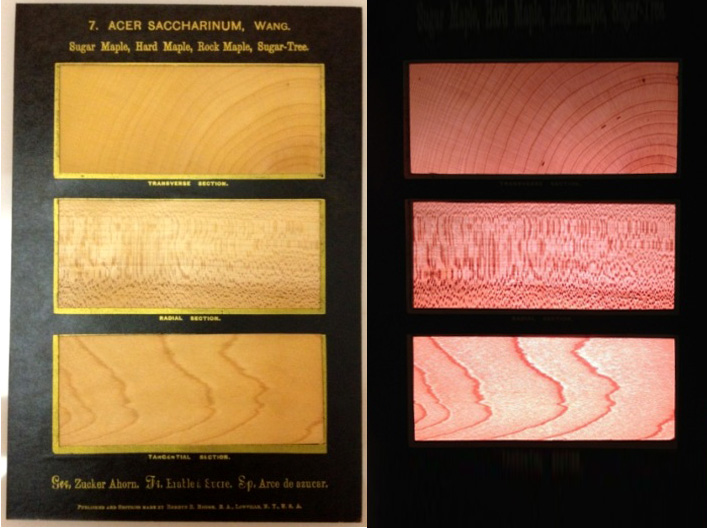
Sugar maple from The American Woods containing (from top to bottom) transverse, radial and tangential sections. The image on the right shows light passing through the specimen, which allows examination of fine structures with a microscope.

Hough acquired an interest in forestry and natural history from his father, Franklin B. Hough, a physician and botanist, who spent much time with his son in the outdoors. He attended Cornell University in Ithaca, New York and studied medicine, later qualifying as a physician like his father. His passion however, was for botany.

Hough developed a specialized veneer cutter capable of slicing wood to a thickness of 1/1200 inch (0.021 mm). He started a business cutting and printing flexible, translucent wooden cards "for all fancy and business purposes", and also sold magic lantern and microscope slides made from the thinnest transverse sections.

After seeing German botanist Herman von Nördlinger's volumes of European tree cross-sections, Hough was inspired to make his own representing "all of the American woods, or at least the most important". Between 1888 and 1913, Hough published thirteen volumes of The American Woods: exhibited by actual specimens and with copious explanatory text, an exsiccata-like collection of wood samples from North American trees, presented as paper-thin cross-sectional slices. To each tree he dedicated a cardboard plate which contained three slices—transverse, radial, and tangential—of the wood, accompanied by information about its botany, habitat and medicinal and commercial uses. Copies of his work are valuable items in the special collections of libraries and xylotheques.

The first volume of American Woods, focusing upon trees of Hough's native New York, was available by subscription for five dollars. Hough had originally planned to publish fifteen volumes, which would include samples of all of the important trees found in North America, but he died in 1924 before the full set was completed. A final, fourteenth volume was published in 1928 using samples and notes made by Hough that were compiled by his daughter, Marjorie Galloway Hough. In total, each volume contained at least 25 plates and the complete 14-volume collection comprises 1,056 slices representing 354 tree species.

== Recognition ==
Hough's botanical work was widely acclaimed in his time. In 1908 he won the Elliott Cresson Gold Medal for his contribution to the understanding and uses of American woods, and American Woods won the top prizes at the 1889 Exposition Universelle in Paris, the 1893 World's Columbian Exposition in Chicago, the 1901 Pan-American Exposition in Buffalo, the 1904 Louisiana Purchase Exposition in St. Louis, and the 1909 Alaska–Yukon–Pacific Exposition in Seattle.

Reviews of American Woods described it as "one of the most valuable contributions to the literature of forestry" and "absolutely without rival". In 2002, it was republished by Taschen under the title Romeyn B. Hough. The Woodbook. The Complete Plates, compiled by Klaus Ulrich Leistikow including a selection of lithographs of some trees' leaves and berries by Charles Sprague Sargent.

For antiquarian booksellers American Woods is "one of the most sought-after sets of the 20th century". In 2000 art auction house Christie's sold a complete set for $92,100.

== Bibliography ==
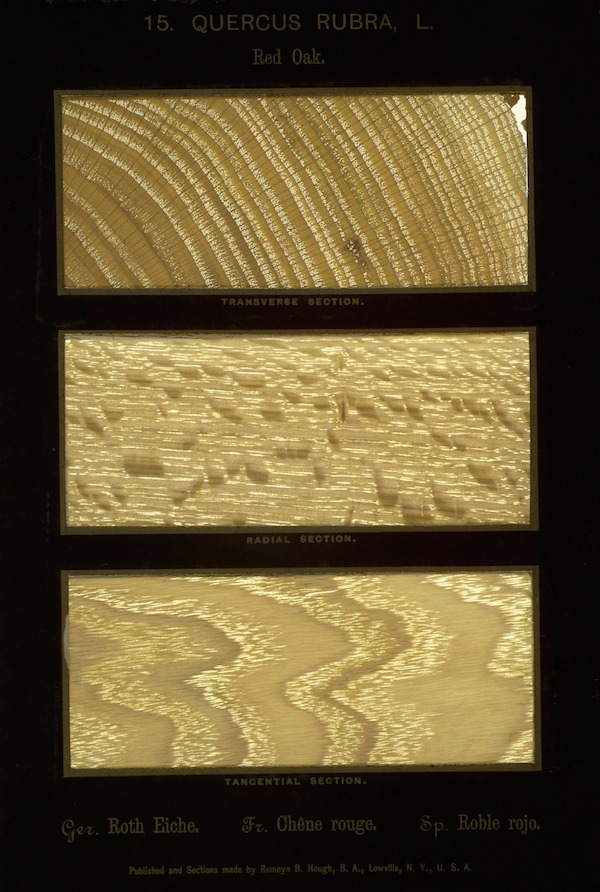
Quercus rubra from The American Woods

Digitized copies of Hough's work are available at archive.org.

- Handbook of the trees of the northern states and Canada east of the Rocky Mountains, photo-descriptive (1907)
- The American Woods: exhibited by actual specimens and with copious explanatory text

- Vol. 1 (1888)
- Vol. 2 (1891)
- Vol. 3 (1892)
- Vol. 4 (1894)
- Vol. 5 (1894)
- Vol. 6 (1895)
- Vol. 7 (1897)
- Vol. 8 (1899)
- Vol. 9 (1903)
- Vol. 10 (1910)
- Vol. 11 (1910)
- Vol. 12 (1911)
- Vol. 13 (1913)
