= Melanogaster aerosa =

Scientific classification
- Kingdom: Animalia
- Phylum: Arthropoda
- Class: Insecta
- Order: Diptera
- Family: Syrphidae
- Genus: Melanogaster
- Species: M. aerosa

Binomial name
- Melanogaster aerosa (Loew, 1843)

Synonyms
- Melanogaster macquarti Loew, 1843

Species of fly

Melanogaster aerosa is a Palearctic hoverfly.

== Taxonomy ==
This species appears in recent literature as well as older literature under the name Chrysogaster macquarti.

== Description ==
External images For terms see Morphology of Diptera
Males: The margin of mouth and apex of the median tubercle of face almost in the same vertical plane. Females: mesonotum with short but dense hairs; abdomen on upper side in middle part matt black. Body length 6.0 to 7.0.mm.

== Habitat ==
Wetlands including flushes, pools and small streams in moorland.

== Biology ==
Flies among waterside vegetation from May to September,. Flowers visited include Cirsium, Hieracium, Leontodon.
