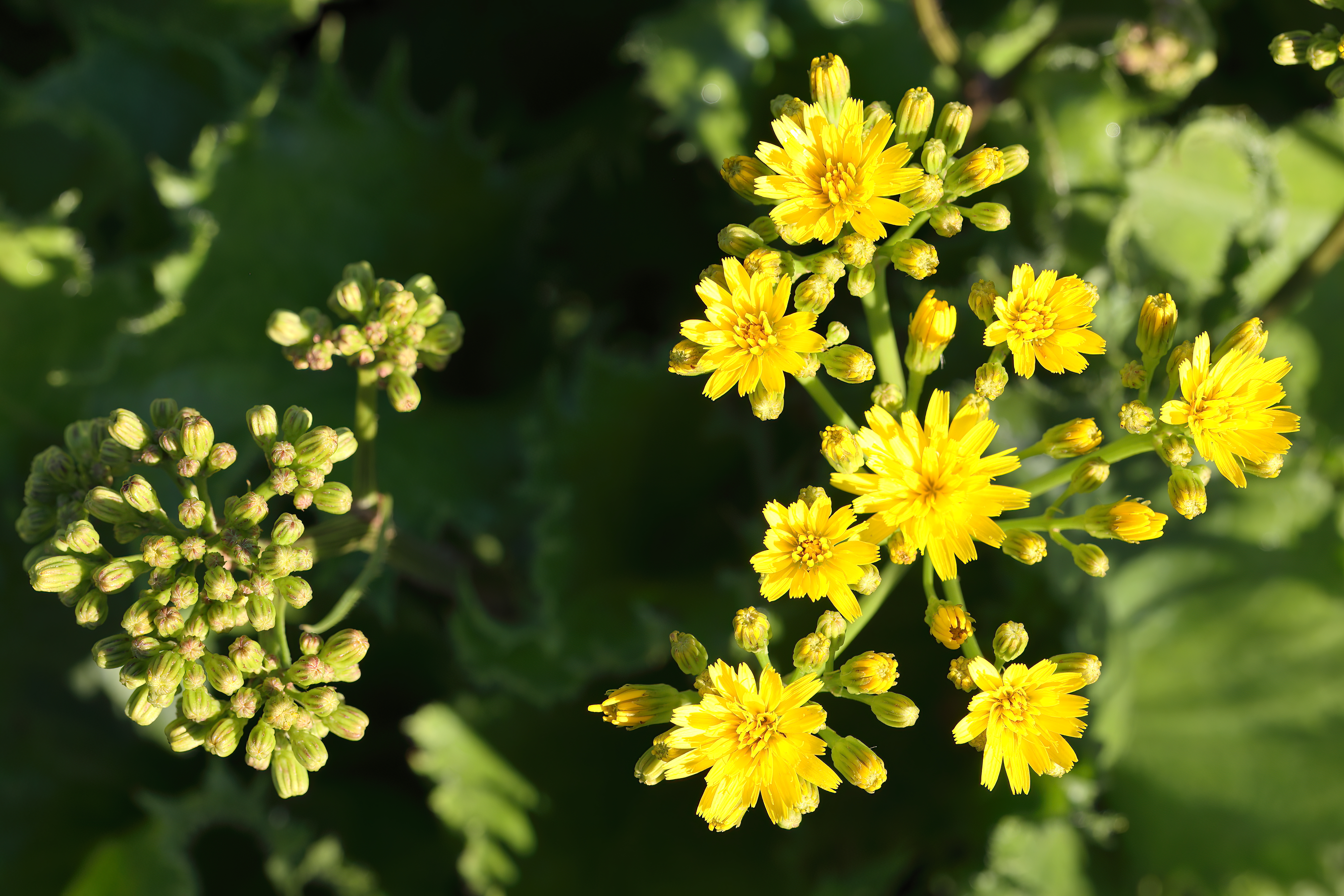
- Flowers
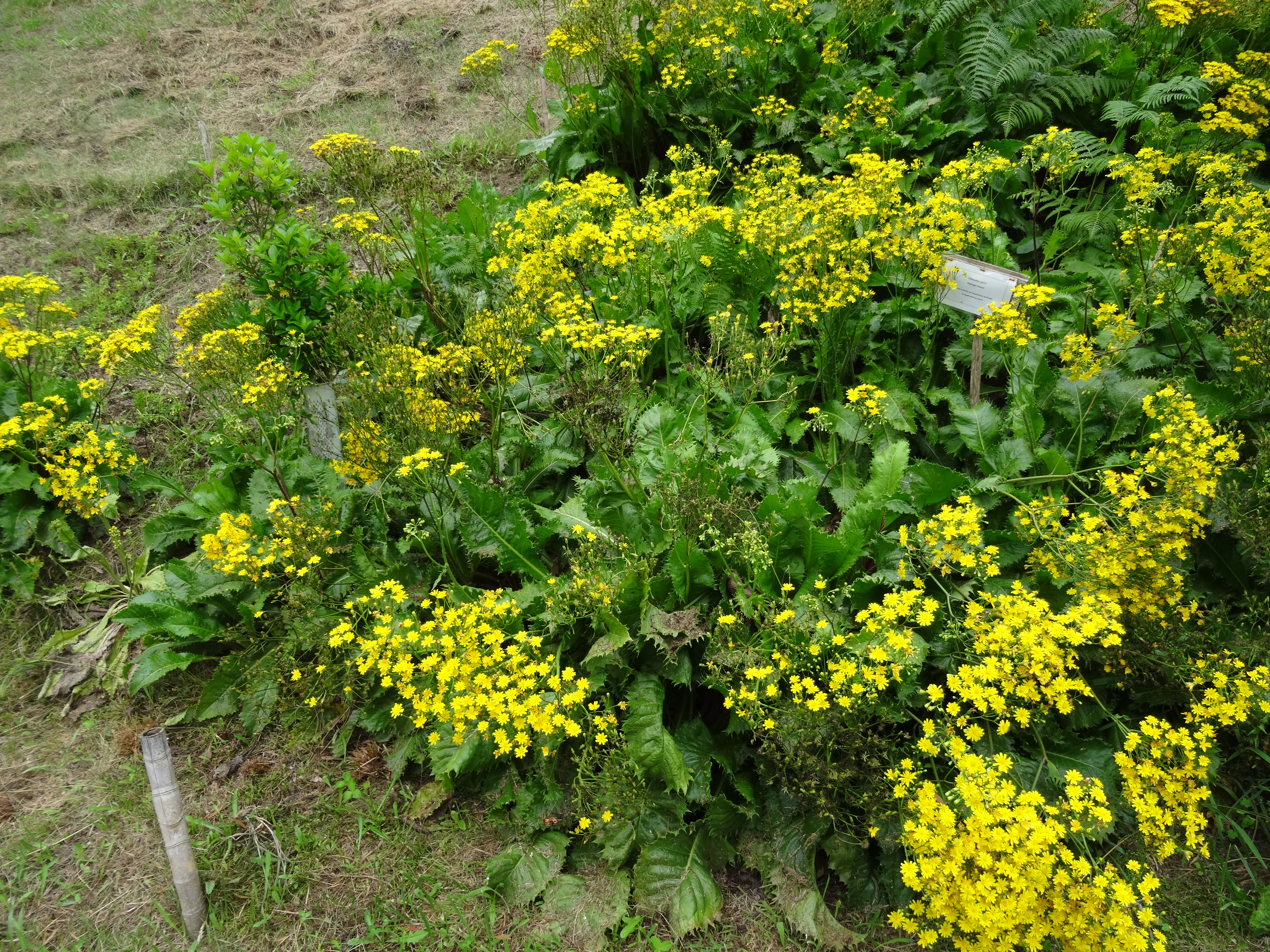
- Habit

Scientific classification
- Kingdom: Plantae
- Clade: Tracheophytes
- Clade: Angiosperms
- Clade: Eudicots
- Clade: Asterids
- Order: Asterales
- Family: Asteraceae
- Genus: Leontodon
- Species: L. rigens

Binomial name
- Leontodon rigens (Aiton) Paiva & Ormonde

Synonyms
- Crepis rigens Aiton; Hypochaeris strigosa Sol. ex Lowe; Microderis rigens (Aiton) DC.; Picris rigens (Aiton) Benth. ex B.D.Jacks.

= Leontodon rigens =

Species of plant

Leontodon rigens, the rigid hawkbit, is a species of flowering plant in the family Asteraceae, native to São Miguel Island in the Azores. A perennial reaching 40 cm (16 in), it is readily available from commercial suppliers.

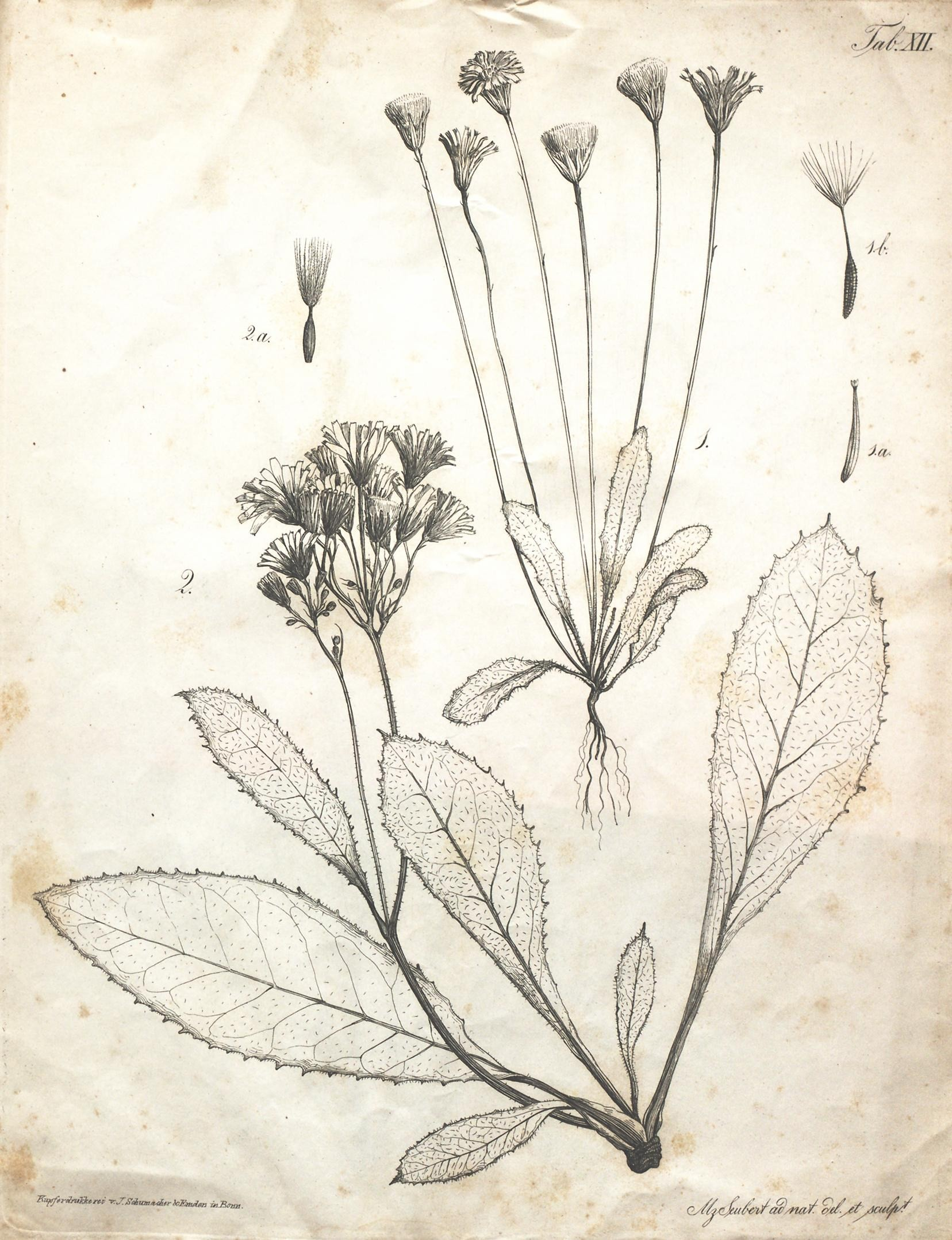
Botanical illustration
