= Osterwalder =

Osterwalder is a Swiss surname. Notable people with this surname include:

- Adolf Osterwalder (1872–1961), Swiss zymologist and bacteriologist
- Alexander Osterwalder (born 1974), Swiss business theorist
- Konrad Osterwalder (1942–2025), Swiss mathematician and physicist
