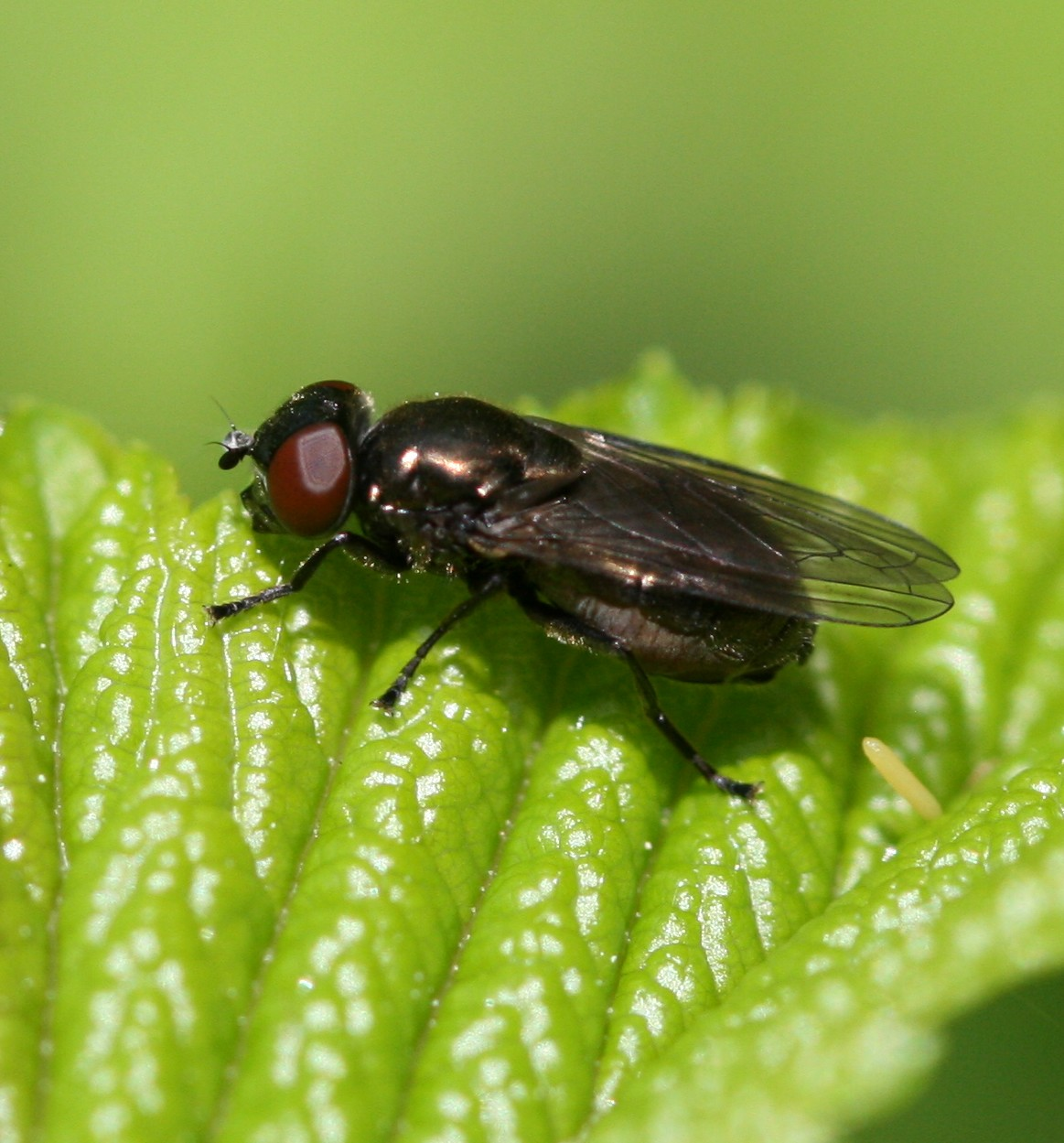
- female External images

Scientific classification
- Kingdom: Animalia
- Phylum: Arthropoda
- Class: Insecta
- Order: Diptera
- Family: Syrphidae
- Genus: Melanogaster
- Species: M. hirtella

Binomial name
- Melanogaster hirtella (Loew, 1843)

= Melanogaster hirtella =

Species of fly

Melanogaster hirtella is a European species of hoverfly.

== Description ==
Wing length: 5.25–6.75 mm (0.207–0.266 in). Black with dark wings. Male thorax and scutellar dorsum with a mixture of long and short hairs, varying from completely yellowish to a large portion of dark hairs. Face broad: width of the head/width of the face under the antennae: 1.91–2.08. Female thoracic dorsum with long, erect black to grey hairs. The male genitalia are figured by Maibach and Goeldlin de Tiefenau (1994). The larva is figured by Hartley (1961).

== Distribution ==
Palearctic Atlantic Europe. Denmark south to Brittany, the Pyrenees and Portugal. Ireland then east only to the Alps (Switzerland and Liechtenstein).

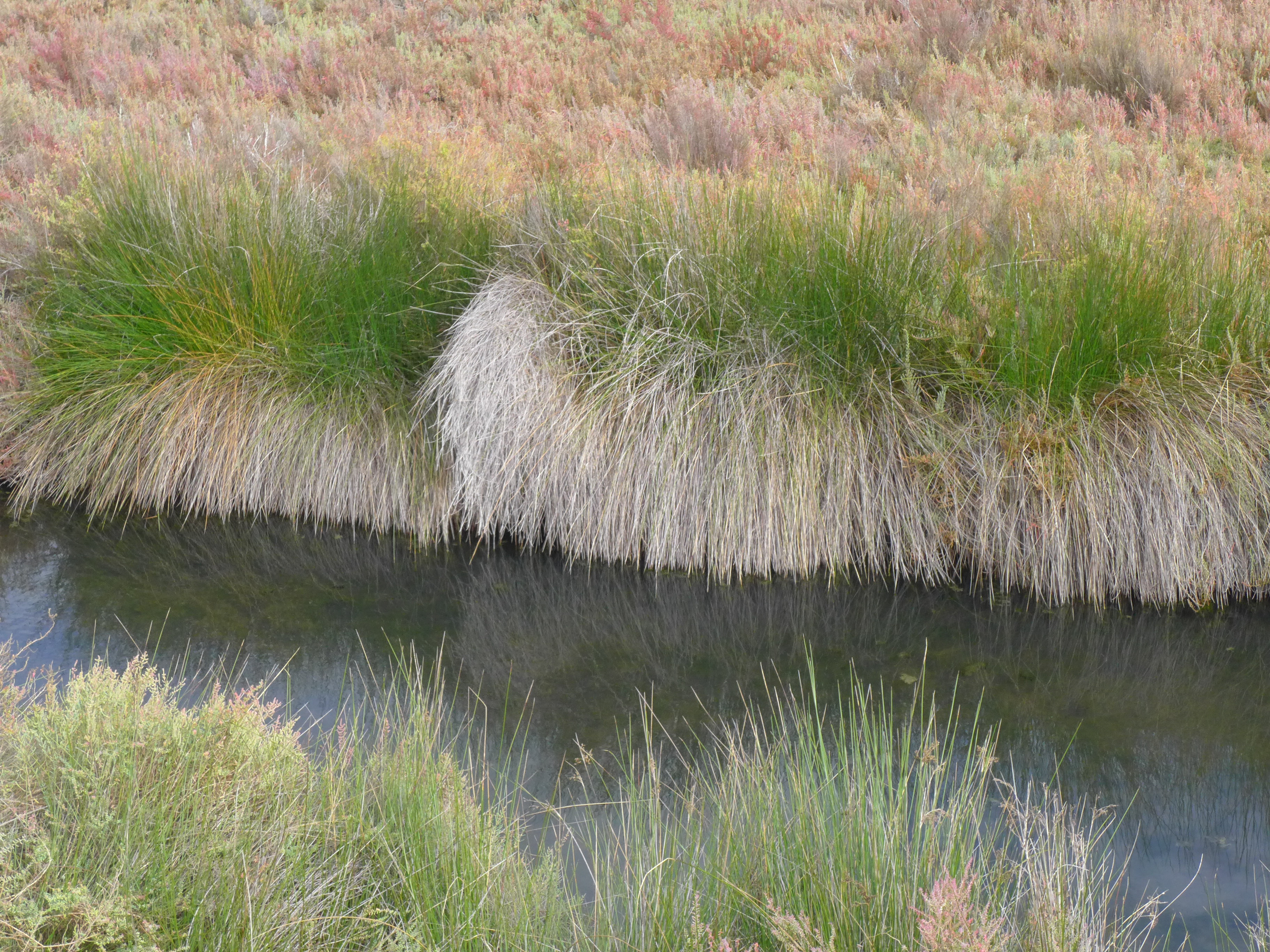
Habitat. Portugal

== Habitat ==
Wetland, fen, marsh, waterside pasture, along woodland streams, beside ponds, lakes, and rivers. Flowers visited include white umbellifers, Caltha, Euphorbia, Iris pseudacorus, Menyanthes, Mimulus guttatus, Potentilla erecta, Pyrus communis, Ranunculus, Sorbus aucuparia, Taraxacum, Viburnum opulus.

== Biology ==
The flight period is April to July. The larva is aquatic, associated with various aquatic plants, including Glyceria and Typha. The larvae tap the aerenchyma to gain their air supply.

== See also ==
- Morphology of Diptera
