= Xylotomy =

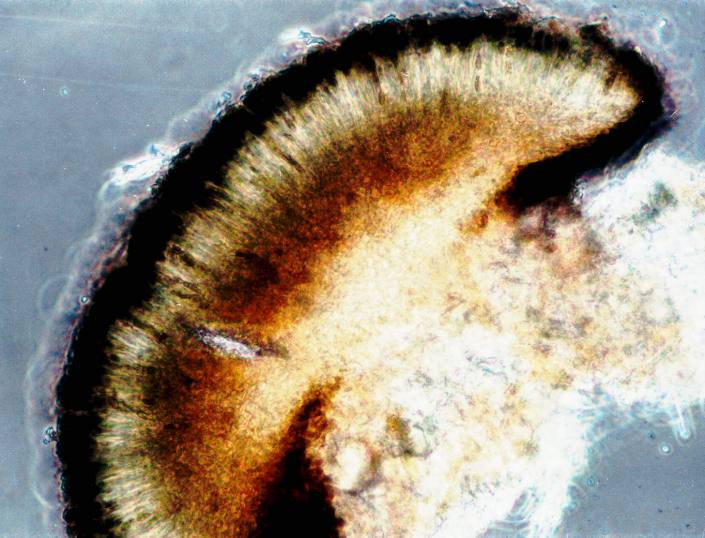
A microscopic section of a lichen apothecium (Amandinea punctata)

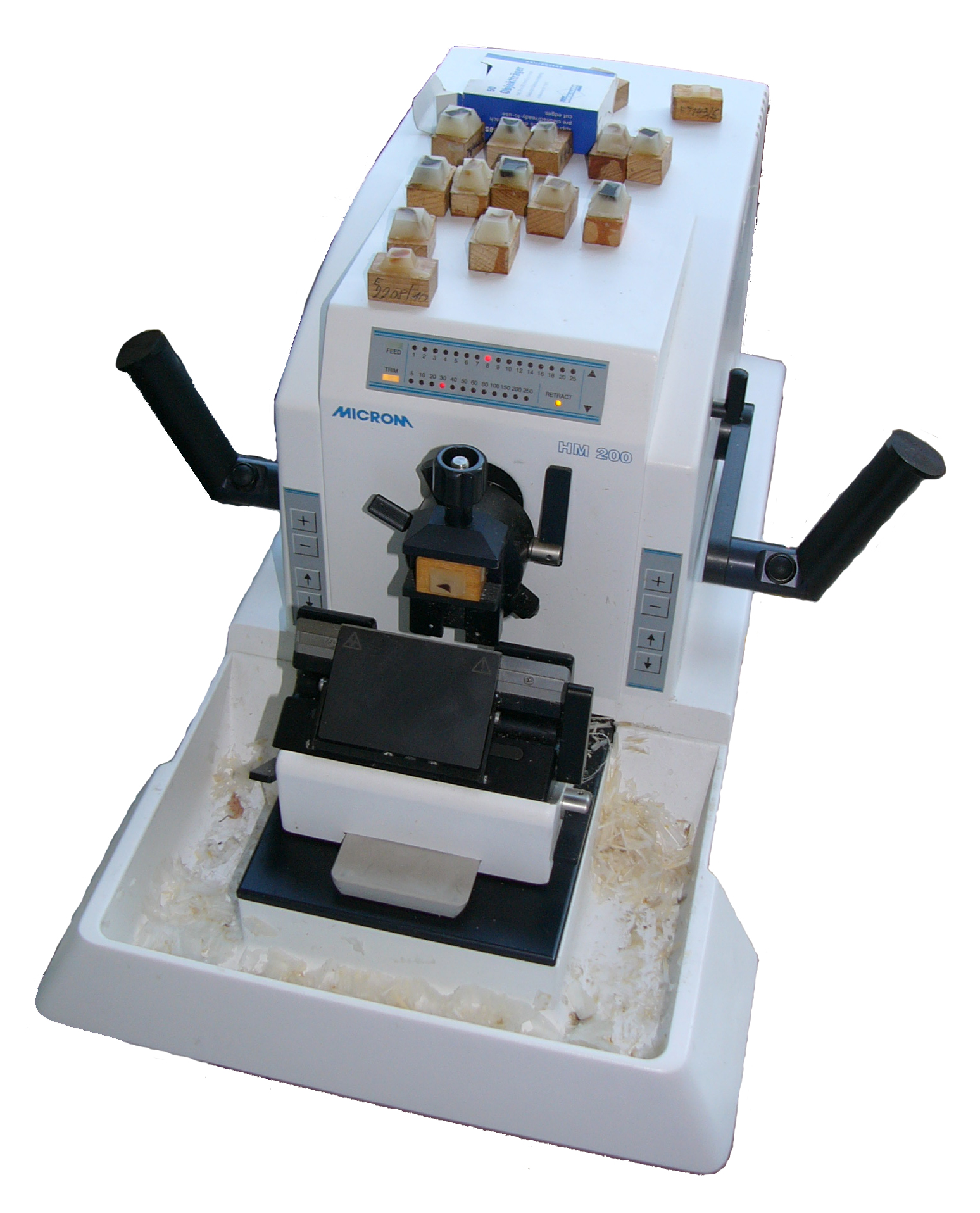
A microtome, used in the process of xylotomy

Xylotomy is the preparation of small slivers of wood for examination under a microscope, often using a microtome.

It is useful for providing forensic evidence in some criminal cases where finding a fragment of wood on an individual and matching it to a weapon used in a crime would be helpful. During the trial of Bruno Richard Hauptmann, accused in the Lindbergh kidnapping during the 1930s, the xylotomist Arthur Koehler was able to provide crucial evidence by linking a piece of pine from a ladder used in a kidnapping to one particular factory whose machinery was defective, and from there to one particular lumberyard. Koehler searched for eighteen months for the yard, and presented his evidence dramatically in court by presenting the court with a chalk rubbing of the samples, which he made there and then, demonstrating that they were identical. He also matched other pieces of the ladder to a chisel used to create the joists, missing from the defendant's tool chest, and to a missing plank from the suspect's attic floor.

It may also be useful in forestry studies. Identifying the species of a piece of wood is not always easy, in which case a xylotheque may provide samples with which the xylotomist can compare his own. Xylotomy may be carried out by a forensic biologist. People who specialize in xylotomy are rare. The public have been known to confuse it with someone who plays the xylophone and they do not tend to take much interest in the subject.

== See also ==
- Wood
- Forensics
