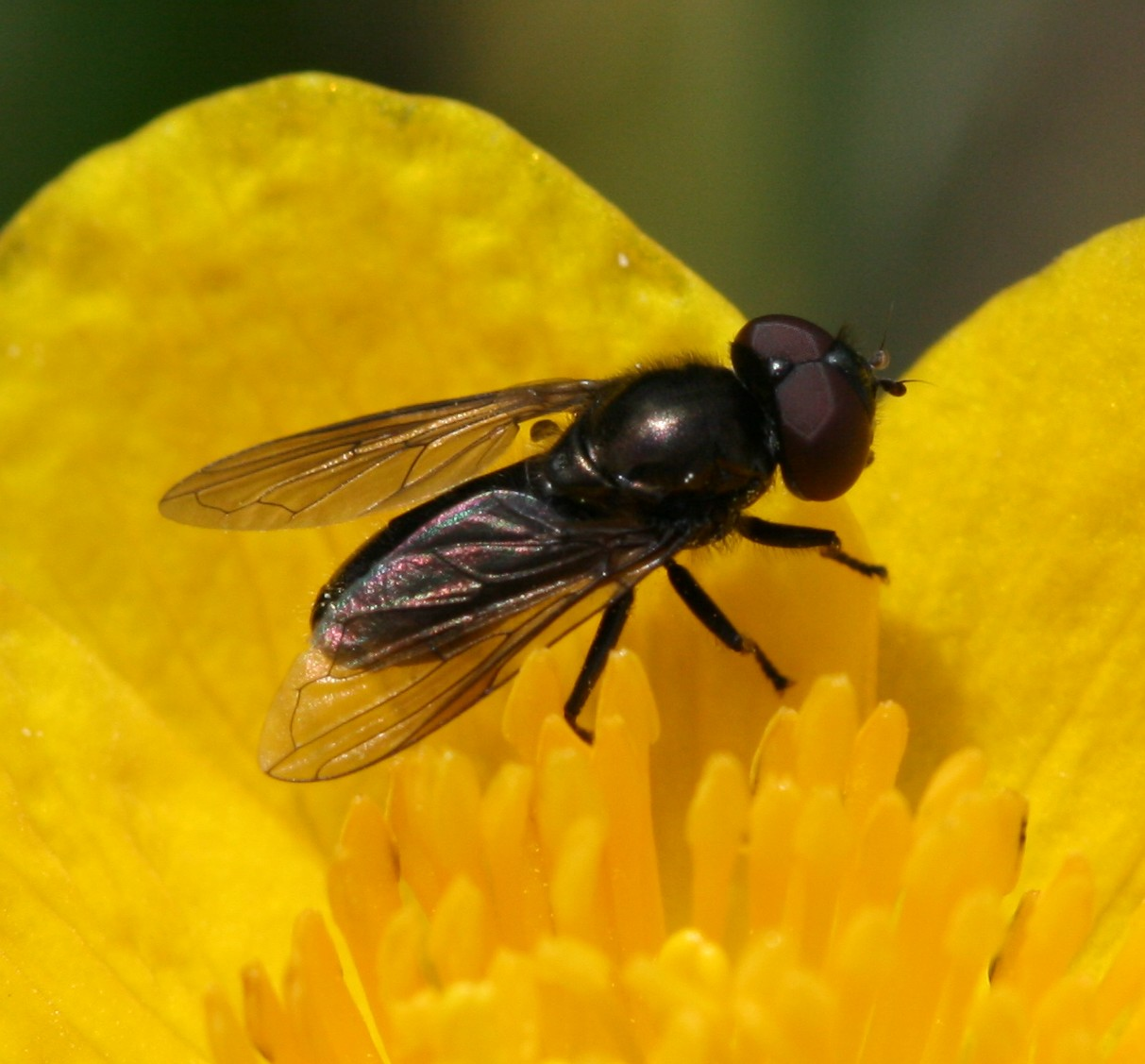
- Melanogaster sp. (male)

Scientific classification
- Kingdom: Animalia
- Phylum: Arthropoda
- Class: Insecta
- Order: Diptera
- Family: Syrphidae
- Tribe: Brachyopini
- Genus: Melanogaster; Rondani, 1857

= Melanogaster (fly) =

Genus of flies

Melanogaster is a genus of hoverflies.

== Species ==
- M. aerosa (Loew, 1843)
- M. curvistylus Vujic & Stuke, 1998
- M. hirtella (Loew, 1843)
- M. inornata (Loew, 1854)
- M. jaroslavensis (Stackelberg, 1922)
- M. nigricans (Stackelberg, 1922)
- M. nuda (Macquart, 1829)
- M. parumplicata (Loew, 1840)
- M. pollinifacies (Violovitsh, 1956)
- M. stackelbergi (Violovitsh, 1978)
- M. tumescens (Loew, 1873)
