= Planá (České Budějovice District) =

- Municipality
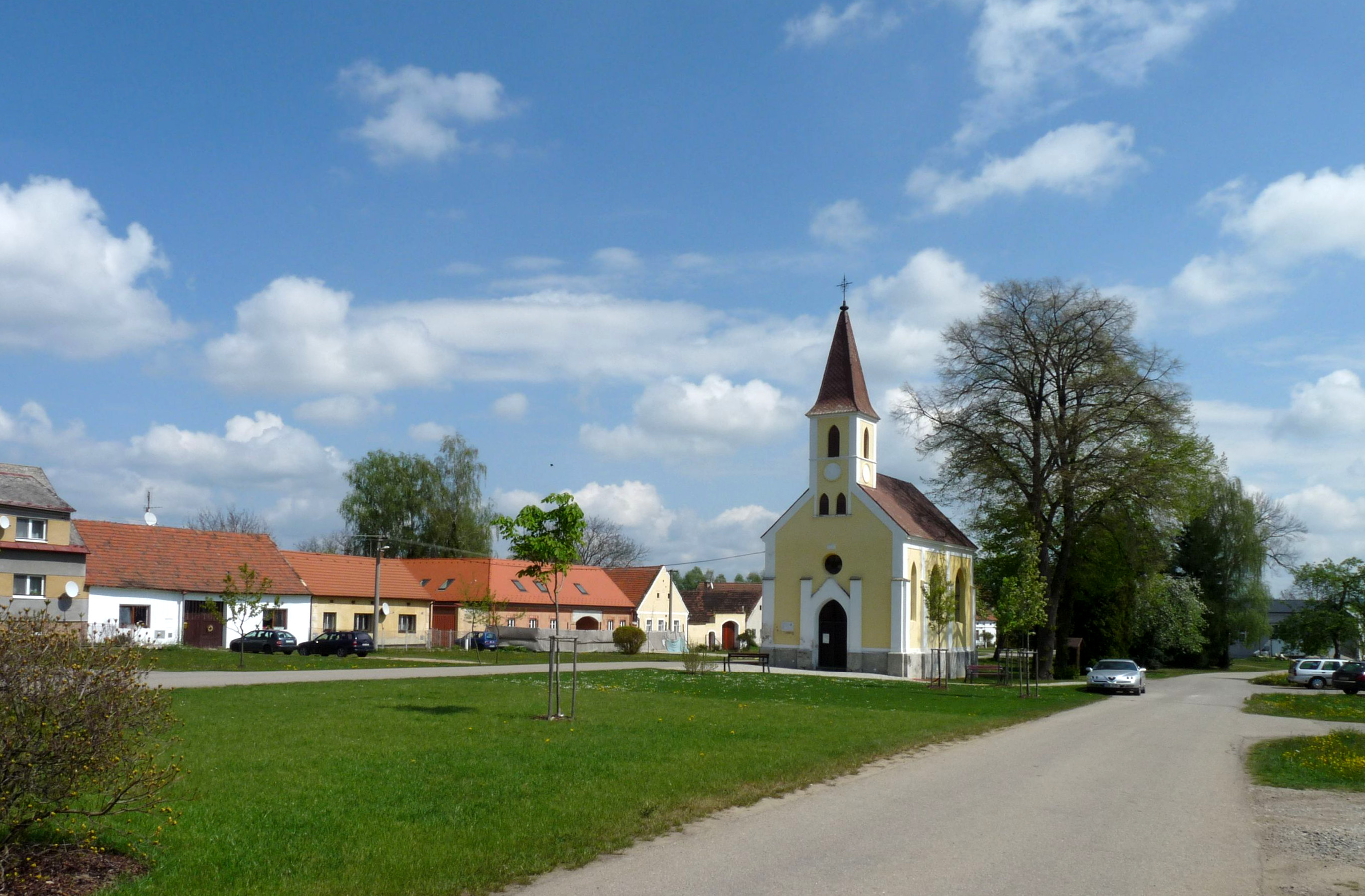
- Centre with the Chapel of the Holy Trinity

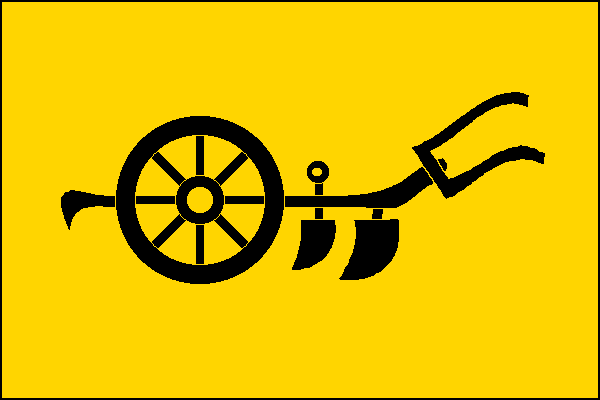
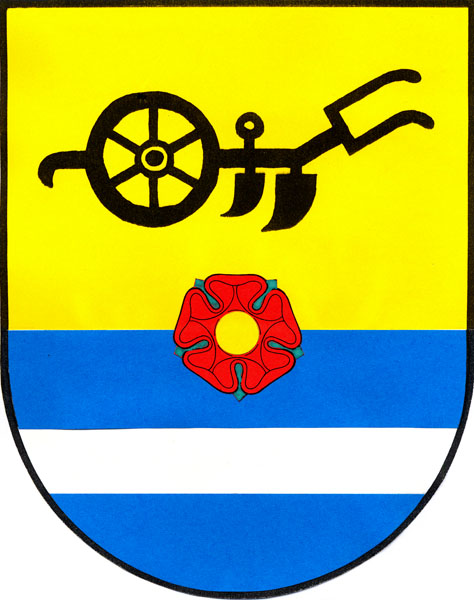
- Flag Coat of arms

- Location in the Czech Republic
- Coordinates: 48°56′37″N 14°27′10″E
- Country: Czech Republic
- Region: South Bohemian
- District: České Budějovice
- First mentioned: 1259

Area
  - Total: 4.19 km^{2} (1.62 sq mi)
- Elevation: 398 m (1,306 ft)

Population (2026-01-01)
  - Total: 256
  - Density: 61.1/km^{2} (158/sq mi)
- Time zone: UTC+1 (CET)
  - Summer (DST): UTC+2 (CEST)
- Postal code: 373 48
- Website: obecplana.cz

Planá (German: Plan) is a municipality and village in České Budějovice District in the South Bohemian Region of the Czech Republic. It has about 300 inhabitants.

== Etymology ==
The Czech word planá meant 'barren', but it also denoted a wide, open landscape.

== Geography ==
Planá is located about 4 kilometres (2 mi) southwest of České Budějovice. It lies in the České Budějovice Basin. The Vltava river forms the southern and eastern municipal borders.

== History ==
The first written mention of Planá is from 1259. Between 1961 and 1990, it was a municipal part of Homole. Since 24 November 1990, it has been a separate municipality.

== Demographics ==
Historical population

Year	Pop.	±%
1869	201	—
1880	183	−9.0%
1890	194	+6.0%
1900	204	+5.2%
1910	225	+10.3%

Year	Pop.	±%
1921	307	+36.4%
1930	280	−8.8%
1950	264	−5.7%
1961	270	+2.3%
1970	233	−13.7%

Year	Pop.	±%
1980	222	−4.7%
1991	200	−9.9%
2001	237	+18.5%
2011	247	+4.2%
2021	246	−0.4%

Source: Censuses

== Transport ==
The I/3 road (part of the European route E55), specifically the section from České Budějovice to the Czech–Austrian border in Dolní Dvořiště, runs through the municipality.

A part of České Budějovice Airport is located in the municipal territory.

== Sights ==
The only protected cultural monument in the municipality is a homestead from 1881. In the centre of Planá is the Chapel of the Holy Trinity.

== Notable people ==
- Anton Ortmann (1801–1861), Austrian pharmacist and botanist
- Ferdinand Kowarz (1838–1914), Austrian entomologist
