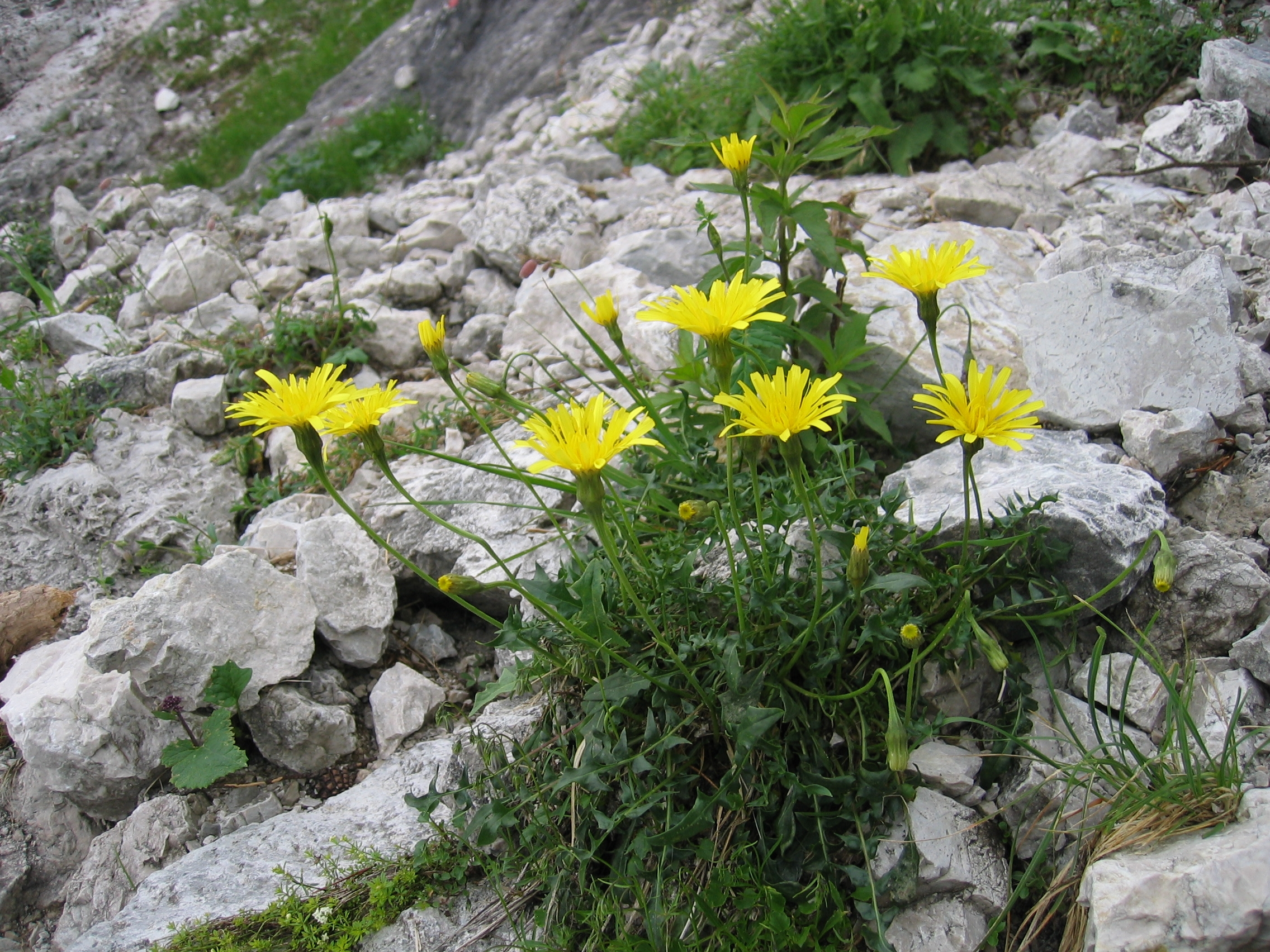

Scientific classification
- Kingdom: Plantae
- Clade: Tracheophytes
- Clade: Angiosperms
- Clade: Eudicots
- Clade: Asterids
- Order: Asterales
- Family: Asteraceae
- Genus: Leontodon
- Species: L. hispidus

Binomial name
- Leontodon hispidus L., 1753

= Leontodon hispidus =

Species of flowering plant

Leontodon hispidus is a species of hawkbit known by the common names bristly hawkbit and rough hawkbit. It is native to Europe but can be found throughout North America as an introduced species.

It ranked first place among the "non-weed" perennials examined in a recent British study for meadow flora nectar productivity. Its production was almost twice as high as the best-ranking annual that was not considered a weed. Certain plants classed as weeds (including ragwort, bull thistle, and creeping thistle) produced the most nectar of all.
