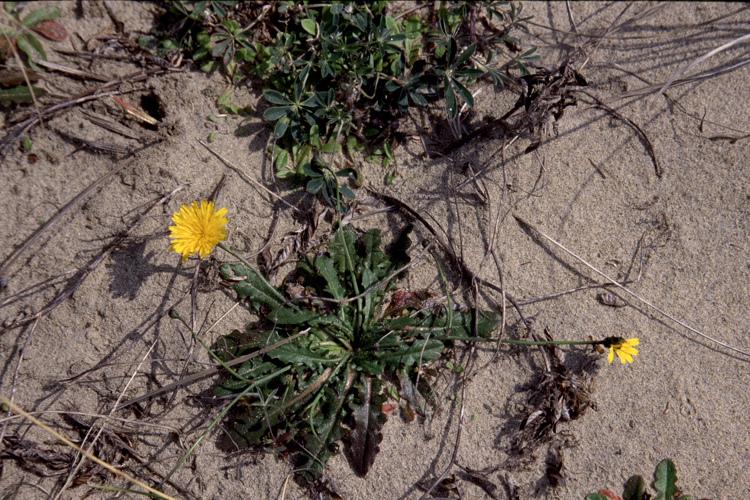

Scientific classification
- Kingdom: Plantae
- Clade: Tracheophytes
- Clade: Angiosperms
- Clade: Eudicots
- Clade: Asterids
- Order: Asterales
- Family: Asteraceae
- Genus: Leontodon
- Species: L. saxatilis

Binomial name
- Leontodon saxatilis Lam.

Synonyms
- List: Apargia gouanii Schleich.; Apargia hirta (L.) Scop.; Apargia hyoseroides Vest; Apargia laevis Moench; Apargia nudicaulis Britton, N.L.Britton & A.Brown; Aracium pygmaeum Miq.; Baldingeria pygmaea F.W.Schmidt; Bohadschia hirta (L.) F.W.Schmidt; Colobium hirtum (L.) Roth; Colobium taraxacoides (Vill.) Holub; Crepis hirta L.; Crepis nudicaulis L.; Hedypnois hirta (L.) Sm.; Hieracium villarsii Vill. ex Steud.; Hyoseris cichorioides Steud.; Hyoseris hirta (L.) Gaertn.; Hyoseris pygsaea Aiton; Hyoseris taraxacoides Vill.; Leontodon bauhini Bubani; Leontodon bollei Sch.Bip. ex A.Chev.; Leontodon gouanii Hegetschw.; Leontodon hastilis var. arenarius Duby; Leontodon hyoseroides DC.; Leontodon leysseri (Wallr.) Beck; Leontodon nudicalyx (Lag.) H.P.Fuchs ex Janch.; Leontodon nudicaulis (L.) Banks ex Lowe; Leontodon psilocalix Mérat; Leontodon taraxacoides (Vill.) Willd. ex Mérat; Leontodon taraxaconaster Vand.; Picris hirta (L.) All.; Rhagadiolus taraxacoides All.; Thrincia arenaria Martrin-Donos; Thrincia glabra Schleich.; Thrincia hirta (L.) Roth; Thrincia laevis Lag.; Thrincia leyseri Wallr.; Thrincia major Peterm.; Thrincia mauritanica Spreng.; Thrincia nudicalyx Lag.; Thrincia nudicaulis Lowe; Thrincia psilocalyx Lag. ex Rchb.; Thrincia psilostachya Lag. ex Webb & Berthel.; Thrincia pygmaea Pers.; Thrincia taraxacoides Lacaita; Thrincia taraxacoides Gaudin; Thrixa hirta (L.) Dulac; Tolpis pygmaea Steud.; Virea nudicaulis House

= Leontodon saxatilis =

Species of flowering plant

Leontodon saxatilis is a species of hawkbit known by the common names lesser hawkbit, rough hawkbit, and hairy hawkbit. It is native to Europe and North Africa but can be found in many other places across the globe as an introduced species and often a noxious weed. This is a dandelion-like herb growing patches of many erect, leafless stems from a basal rosette of leaves. The leaves are 2 to 15 centimeters long, 0.5 to 2.5 centimeters wide, entire or lobed, and green in color. Atop the stems are solitary flower heads which are ligulate, containing layered rings of ray florets with no disc florets. The florets are yellow with toothed tips. The fruit is a cylindrical achene with a pappus of scales. Fruits near the center of the flower head are rough, while those growing along the edges of the head are smooth.
