= Bill Stern (botanist) =

American botanist (1926–2021)

- Born: William Louis Stern; September 10, 1926; Paterson, New Jersey, U.S.
- Died: November 1, 2021 (aged 95)
- Occupation: Botanist

William Louis Stern (September 10, 1926 – November 1, 2021) was an American botanist and professor. Educated at the National Farm School, Rutgers University and the University of Illinois, he specialized in the anatomy of wood.

Stern chaired the Department of Botany at the University of Florida from 1979 to 1985. He was also the author of Index Xylariorum, a repertoire of xylotheque wood, and was a member of the International Wood Collectors Society.
