= Xylotheque =

Collection of wood samples

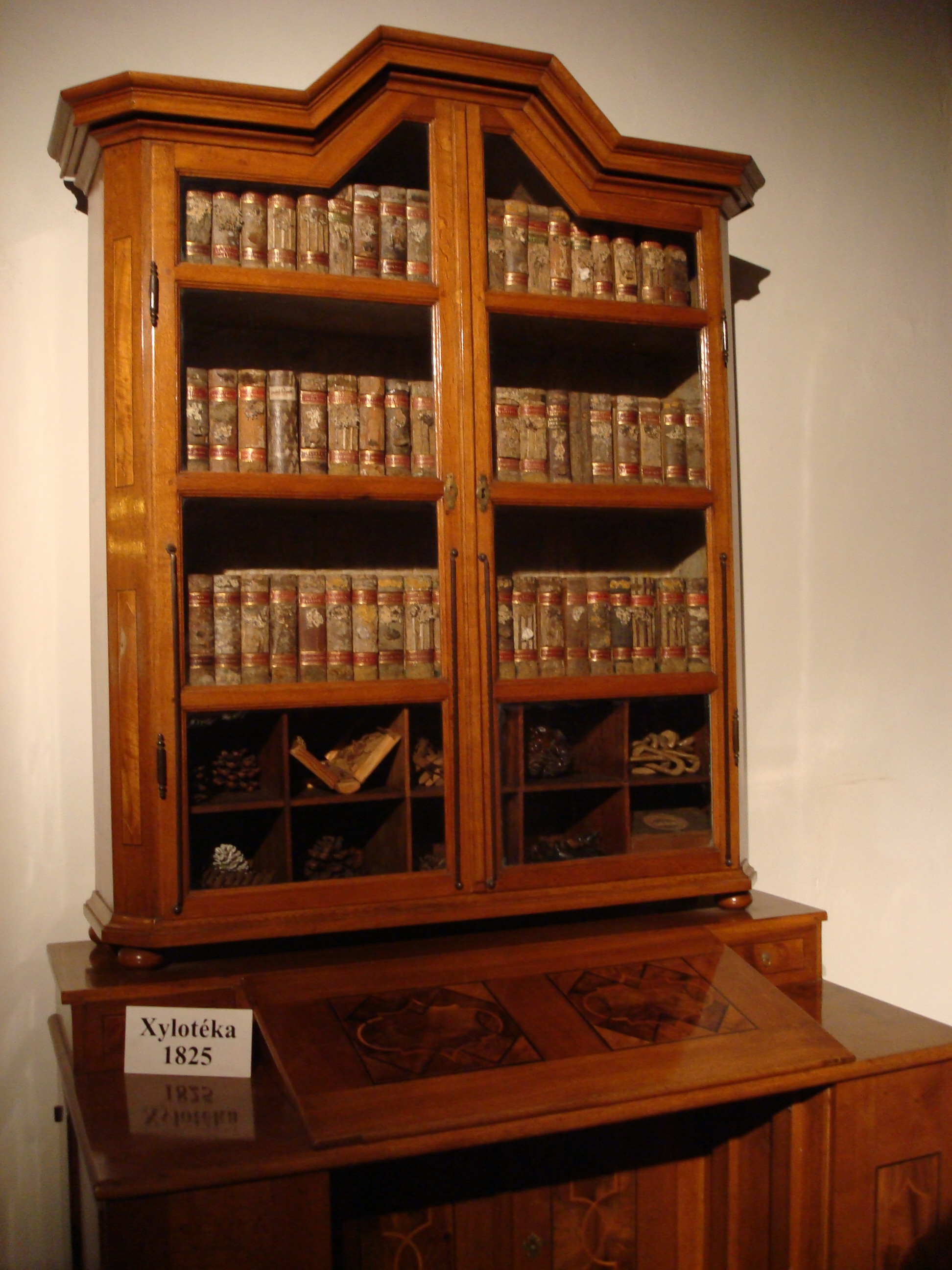
Strahov Monastery Xylotheque (1825)

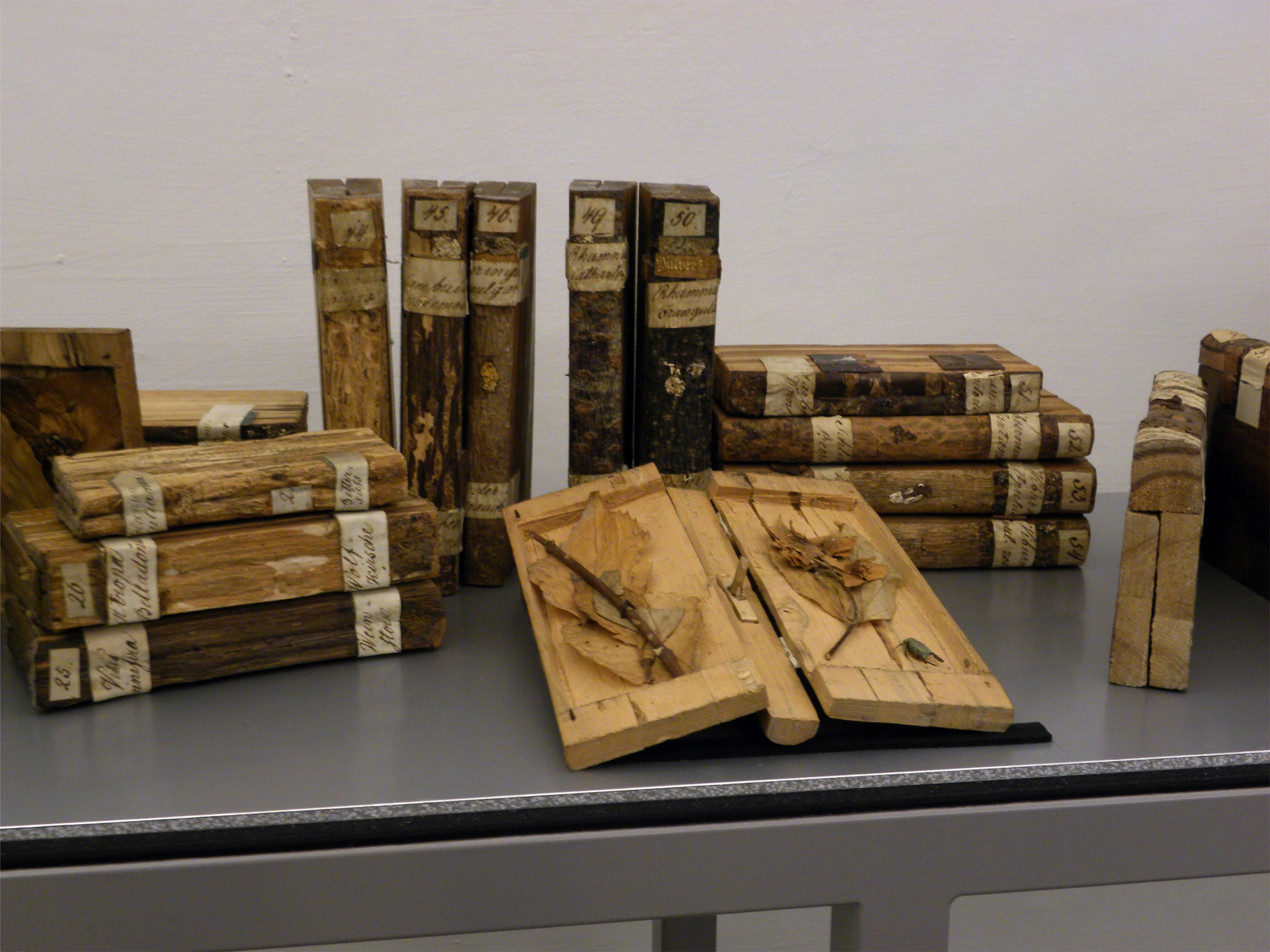
Volumes in a xylotheque in Lilienfeld, Austria

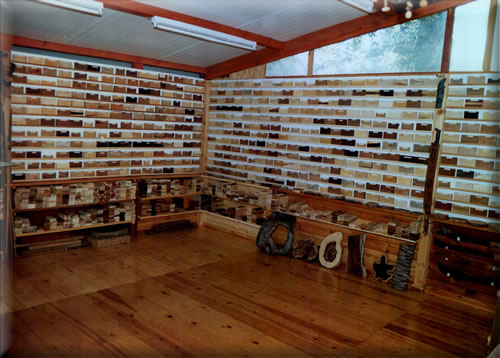
Interior of the Xiloteque Manuel Soler, in Dénia (Spain)

A xylotheque or xylothek (from the Greek xylon for "wood" and theque meaning "repository") is special form of herbarium that consists of a collection of authenticated wood specimens. It is also known as a xylarium (from the Greek xylon for "wood" and Latin arium meaning "separate place"). Traditionally, xylotheque specimens were in the form of book-shaped volumes, each made of a particular kind of wood and holding samples of the different parts of the corresponding plant. While the terms are often used interchangeably, some use xylotheque to refer to these older collections of wooden 'books' and xylarium for modern collections in which some or all of the specimens are in simpler shapes, such as blocks or plaques with information engraved on their surfaces. Many countries have at least one xylotheque with native flora, and some also house flora from other parts of the world. They are valuable to specialists in forestry, botany, conservation, forensics, art restoration, paleontology, archaeology, and other fields.

== History ==
Xylotheques date back to the late 17th century, when wood specimens began to appear in cabinets of curiosity. Over time, they grew larger and more systematic, with hundreds of individual volumes in a single collection. The oldest extant collection was established in 1823 at the University of Leningrad, and by the middle of the century they had been established in many European countries. Australia now houses 12 xylaria holding 11% of the world's wood specimens, while the Oxford Forestry Institute's xylarium holds about 13%.

In older xylotheques, the wooden volumes were typically made out of the same wood as the specimens inside and sometimes decorated with tree bark and associated lichens and mosses. Each volume housed seeds, flowers, twigs, and leaves from the corresponding tree or bush, along with a written description hidden in a small compartment set into the inner spine. Some xylotheques house exsiccata-like published works in limited editions with mounted thin sections of wood arranged in book-like volumes. Examples are the famous series of Querschnitte von hundert Holzarten... edited by Hermann von Nördlinger and American Woods edited by Romeyn Beck Hough.

An alternative form of xylotheque found in Japan and elsewhere featured paintings of the plant parts rather than actual field specimens.

Even a modest collection of wood samples has value, as each of its samples has a particular history. Xylotheques provide comparison samples for xylotomy, art historical studies, and scientific studies of the physical and mechanical properties of wood, such as durability and preservation. Xylotheques are also useful for anyone who needs to make a morphological-visual analysis of wood.

The xylotheque with the largest number of samples is the Samuel James Record Collection in the United States, which holds 98,000 samples. Formerly housed at the Forestry School of Yale University in New Haven, Connecticut, it was transferred to the U.S. Forest Service's Forest Products Laboratory in 1969. The second largest xylotheque belongs to the Royal Museum of Central Africa in Tervuren, Belgium, with 57,000 samples. The Thünen Institute of Wood Research in Hamburg has more than 37,000 samples.

== Selected xylotheques ==
Xyloteque	Samples
Xylarium Bogoriense, Bogor (Indonesia)	187,657
Madison, Wisconsin (United States)	98,000
Tervuren (Belgium)	57,000
Hamburg (Germany)	37,000
RBG Kew (UK)	34,000
Building Research Establishment (UK)	30,000
São Paulo (Brazil)	17,000
Beecroft (Australia)	13,000

== Index xylariorum ==
The Index xylariorum is a listing of the world's xylaria. It was conceived by William Louis Stern (1926–2021) who first published the work in 1967. A subsequent work in 1981 was published by the Botanic Garden of the Polish Academy of Sciences as "No. 1" of the series. Stern then published the third revised edition of this work in 1988. Anna H. Lynch and Peter E. Gasson compiled Index Xylariorum 4.1 in 2010, and the International Association of Wood Anatomists updated the list in 2016 under the supervision of Frederic Lens. Index Xylariorum 4.1 can also be accessed online as a database through the Global Timber Tracking Network website.

Below is a list of the Index xylariorum codes, locations, and institutional names included by Stern in his 1988 Index xylariorum. This list is provided for historical context.

Collapsed list of historic Index xylariorum codes and locations from 1988 publication

Index xylariorum Code	Institution Name
Aw	CAMBRIDGE: Harvard University.
ALCw	ALCOBAÇA; Estação de Experimentação Florestal.
AMw	AMLAI: Birla Institute of Scientific Research.
ARw	YEZIN: Forest Research Institute.
Bw	BERLIN-DAHLEM: Botanischer Garten und Botanisches Museum Berlin-Dahlem.
BBSw	PARAMARIBO; Surinam Forest Service.
BCTw	SÃO PAULO: Instituto de Pesquisas Tecnológicas do Estado de São Paulo.
BHVs	BERLIN: Museum für Naturkunde der Humboldt-Universität zu Berlin.
BISHw	HONOLULU: Bemice P. Bishop Museum.
BKFw	BANGKOK: Royal Forest Department.
BMw	LONDON: British Museum (Natural History).
BOFw	BOGOTÁ: Instituto de Investigaciones Forestales y Madereras.
BPw	BUDAPEST: Hungarian Museum of Natural History.
BRIw	BRISBANE: Queensland Herbarium.
BSILw	LUCKNOW: BirbalSahni Institute of Paleobotany.
BULHw	BULOLO: Papua New Guinea Forestry College.
BWCw	SYRACUSE: College of Environmental Science and Forestry.
BZFw	BOGOR: Lembaga Penelitian Hasil Hutan (Forest Products Research Institute).
CAFw	BEIJING: Chinese Academy of Forestry.
CANBw	CANBERRA: Australian National Herbarium.
CEPECw	ILHÉUS: Centro de Pesquisas do Cacau
CHITw	CHTITAGONG: Forest Research Institute.
CHNw	CHRISTCHURCH: University of Canterbury.
CHRw	CHRISTCHURCH: Department of Scientific and Industrial Research.
CLPw	COLLEGE: Forest Products Research and Development Institute.
CONCw	CONŒPCIÔN: Universidad de Concepción.
CQTw	BRISBANE: Queensland Department of Forestry.
CTBw	PARIS: Centre Technique du Bois et de l'Ameublement.
CTFw	NOGENT-SUR-MARNE: Cenfre Technique Forestier Tropical.
CVRDw	LINHARES: Reserva Florestal da CVRD.
Dw	DELFT: TNO Timber Research Institute.
DBw	DUBLIN: University College.
DDw	DEHRADUN: Forest Research Institute and Colleges.
DEQw	QUITO: Instituto Ecuatoriano de Ciencias Naturales.
DREw	DRESDEN: Wissenschaftlich-technisches Zentrum der holzverarbeitenden Industrie.
ECw	HEREDIA: Universidad Nacional.
EIFw	SANTIAGO: Universidad de Chile.
ESAw	PIRACICABA: Universidade de São Paulo.
FHIw	IBADAN: Forest Research Institute of Nigeria.
FHOw	OXFORD: University of Oxford.
FIw	FLORENCE: Herbarium Universitatis Florentinae and Erbario Tropicale di Firenze.
FLw	FLORENCE: Istituto per la Ricerca sul Legno.
FLASw	GAINESVILLE: University of Florida.
FPAw	HIGHETT: Commonwealth Scientific and Industrial Research Organization.
FPBw	BRASÍLIA: Instituto Brasileiro de Desenvolvimento Florestal.
FRw	FRANKFURT AM MAIN: Naturmuseum und Forschungsinstitut Senckenberg.
FRIGw	GUANGZHOU: Forest Research Institùte of Guangdong Province.
GTw	GEORGETOWN: Guyana Forestry Commission.
HBw	HAVANA: Centro de Investigación Forestal.
HBRw	ITAJAÍ: Herbário "Barbosa Rodrigues."
HEFw	HEFEI: Anhui Agricultural College.
HMw	LONDON: The Homiman Museum and Library.
IFPw	SHENYANG: Institute of Forestry and Pedology.
IICAw	TURRIALBA: Universidad de Costa Rica.
IJw	KINGSTON: Institute of Jamaica.
INPAw	MANAUS: Instituto Nacional de Pesquisas da Amazônia.
ITAw	MANAUS: Instituto de Tecnologia da Amazônia.
JARIw	MONTE DOURADO: Superintendência de Pesquisa Florestal.
Kw	KEW: Royal Botanic Gardens, Economic and Conservation Section.
KARw	KARAJ: College of Natural Resources.
KEPw	KEPONG: Forest Research Institute Malaysia.
K-Jw	KEW: Royal Botanic Gardens, Jodrell Laboratory.
KNw	KAMPALA: Nakawa Forest Research Institute.
KYOw	KYOTO: Kyoto University.
Lw	LEIDEN: Rijksherbarium.
LAEw	LAE: Department of Forests.
LEw	LENINGRAD: V. L. Komarov Botanical Institute.
LILw	TUCUMÁN: Instituto Miguel Lillo.
LISJCw	LISBON: Jardim e Museu Agrícola Tropical.
LIVw	LIVERPOOL: Liverpool Museum.
LNECw	LISBON: Laboratório Nacional de Engenharia Civil.
MADw	MADISON: U.S. Forest Products Laboratory.
MADRw	MADRID: Instituto Nacional de Investigaciones Agrarias.
MAD-SJRw	MADISON: U.S. Forest Products Laboratory.
MCSw	MILAN: Civico Museo de Storia Naturale.
MEDELw	MEDELLIN: Universidad Nacional.
MERw	MÉRIDA: Universidad de los Andes.
MEXFW	MÉXICO: Instituto Nacional de Investigaciones Forestales.
MEXUw	MÉXICO: Universidad Nacional Autónoma de México.
MGw	BELÉM: Museu Paraense Emilio Goeldi.
MICHw	ANNARBOR: University of Michigan.
MUNw	MUNICH: Universität München.
NATw	ILANOTH: Agricultural Research Organisation.
NINw	MANAGUA: Nicaraguan Institute of Natural Resources and Environment.
NMWw	CARDIFF: National Museum of Wales.
NYw	BRONX: The New York Botanical Garden.
NYJw	PORTLAND: World Forestry Center.
OLw	OTTAWA: Forintek Canada Corporation.
PACw	RALEIGH: North Carolina State University.
PATw	PARIS: Muséum National d'Histoire Naturelle.
PFPw	PRETORIA: South African Forestry Research Institute.
PMPw	BOROKO: Forest Products Research and Development Centre.
PRFw	PRINCES RISBOROUGH: Building Research Establishment.
PTw	PRAGUE: Timber Research and Development Institute.
RBw	RIO DE JANEIRO: Jardim Botânico do Rio de Janeiro.
RBHw	HAMBURG: Bundesforschungsanstalt für Forst- und Holzwirtschaft.
RFw	ROSENHEIM: Fachhochschule Rosenheim.
RPPRw	RIO PIEDRAS: Instituteof Tropical Forestry.
RSAw	CLAREMONT: Rancho Santa Ana Botanic Garden.
RTIw	AMSTERDAM: Royal Tropical Institute.
SANw	SANDAKAN: Forest Research Centre.
SARFw	KUCKNG: Forest Department.
SFCw	BEECROFT: Forestry Commission of New South Wales.
SPw	SÃO PAULO: Instituto de Botânica.
S-PAw	STOCKHOLM: Swedish Museum of Natural History.
SPSFw	SãO PAULO: Instituto Florestal de São Paulo.
STEw	STELLENBOSCH: University of Stellenbosch.
SVw	HAVANA: Academia de Ciencias de Cuba.
SWTw	STOCKHOLM: Swedish Institute for Wood Technology Research.
SYSw	GUANGZHOU: Sun Yat-Sen University.
SZDw	SZEGED: Universitatis Szeged.
Tw	TERVUREN: Koninklijk Museum voor Midden-Afrika (Musée Royal de l'Afrique Centrale).
TAIw	TAIPEI: National Taiwan University.
TAIFw	TAIPEI: Taiwan Forestry Research Institute.
TAUw	THESSALONIKI: Aristotelian University.
TIPw	RECIFE: Fundação Instituto Tecnológico do Estado de Pernambuco.
TOFOw	TOKYO: University of Tokyo.
TRTw	TORONTO: University of Toronto.
TSFw	THARANDT: Technische Universität Dresden.
TWTw	TSUKUBA: Forestry and Forest Products Research Institute.
Uw	UTRECHT: Rijksuniversiteit te Utrecht.
UCw	RICHMOND: University of California.
UCNWw	BANGOR: University College of North Wales.
USw	WASHINGTON: Smithsonian Institution.
VENw	CARACAS: Instituto Botánico.
VFw	VIENNA: Forstlichen Bundesversuchsanstalt.
VLw	VANCOUVER: Forintek Canada Corporation.
WAGw	WAGENINGEN: Department of Plant Taxonomy, Agricultural University.
WDw	WINTERTHUR: The Henry Francis du Pont WinterthuT Museum.
WFw	ADELAIDE: Woods and Forest Department.
WIBw	WAGENINGEN: Department of Forestry Techniques, Agricultural University.
WLw	WAGENINGEN: Botanisch Laboratorium.
WZw	ROTORUA: Forest Research Institute.
XALw	XALAPA: Instituto Nacional de Investigaciones Sobre Recursos Bióticos.
YANw	YANGLING: Northwestern College of Forestry.
ZAw	ZAGREB: University of Zagreb.
ZTw	ZÜRICH: Eidgenössische Technische Hochschule.

== In popular culture ==
For documenta 13 in 2012, American artist Mark Dion created a new hexagonal display chamber for the Schildbach Xylotheque at the Natural History Museum in Kassel, Germany. As part of the project, he created six new volumes made of wood from each of the continents (excluding Antarctica).

== See also ==
- List of woods
- Arboretum
- Botanical gardens
