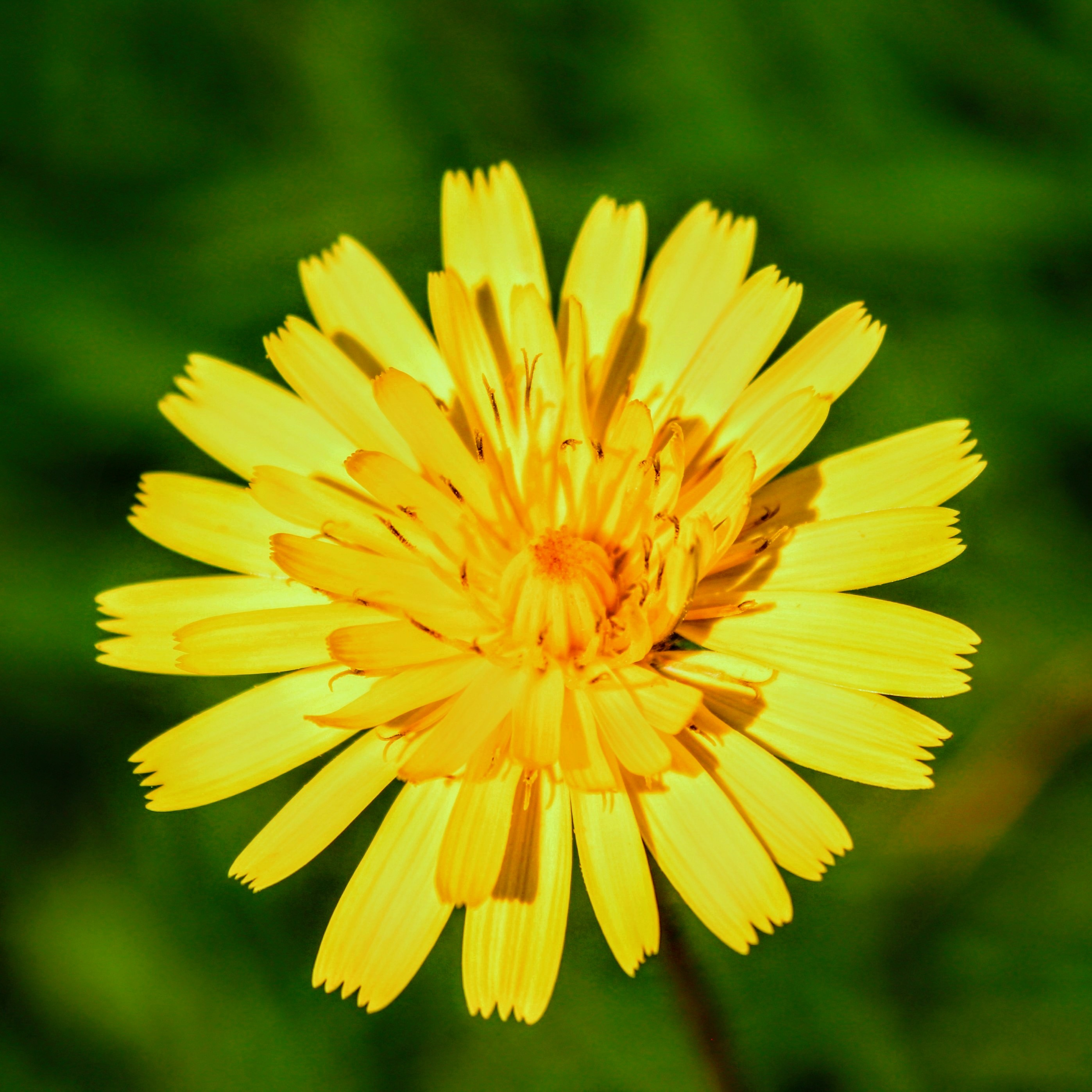

Scientific classification
- Kingdom: Plantae
- Clade: Tracheophytes
- Clade: Angiosperms
- Clade: Eudicots
- Clade: Asterids
- Order: Asterales
- Family: Asteraceae
- Genus: Leontodon
- Species: L. tuberosus

Binomial name
- Leontodon tuberosus L.

= Leontodon tuberosus =

Species of plant

Leontodon tuberosus is a species of plant in the family Asteraceae.

== Sources ==
This article incorporates text from a free content work. Licensed under CC0 (license statement/permission). Text taken from Leontodon tuberosus. Encyclopedia of Life.
