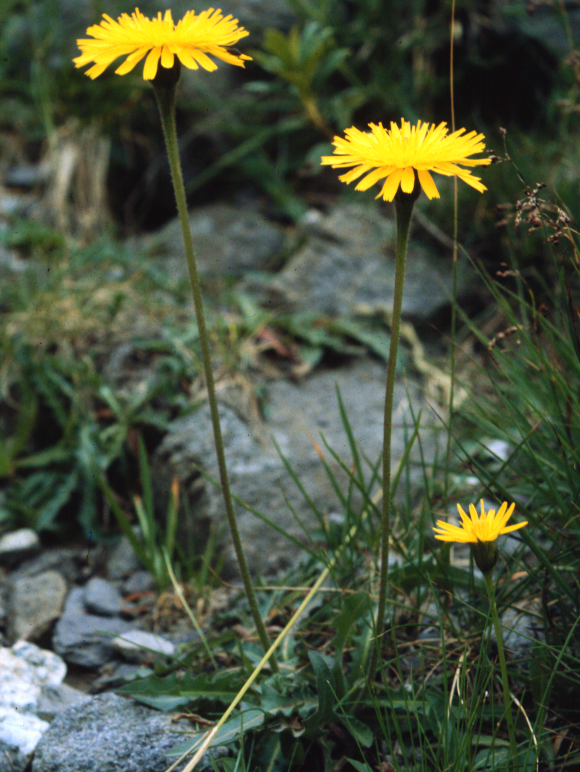
- Leontodon hispidus L.
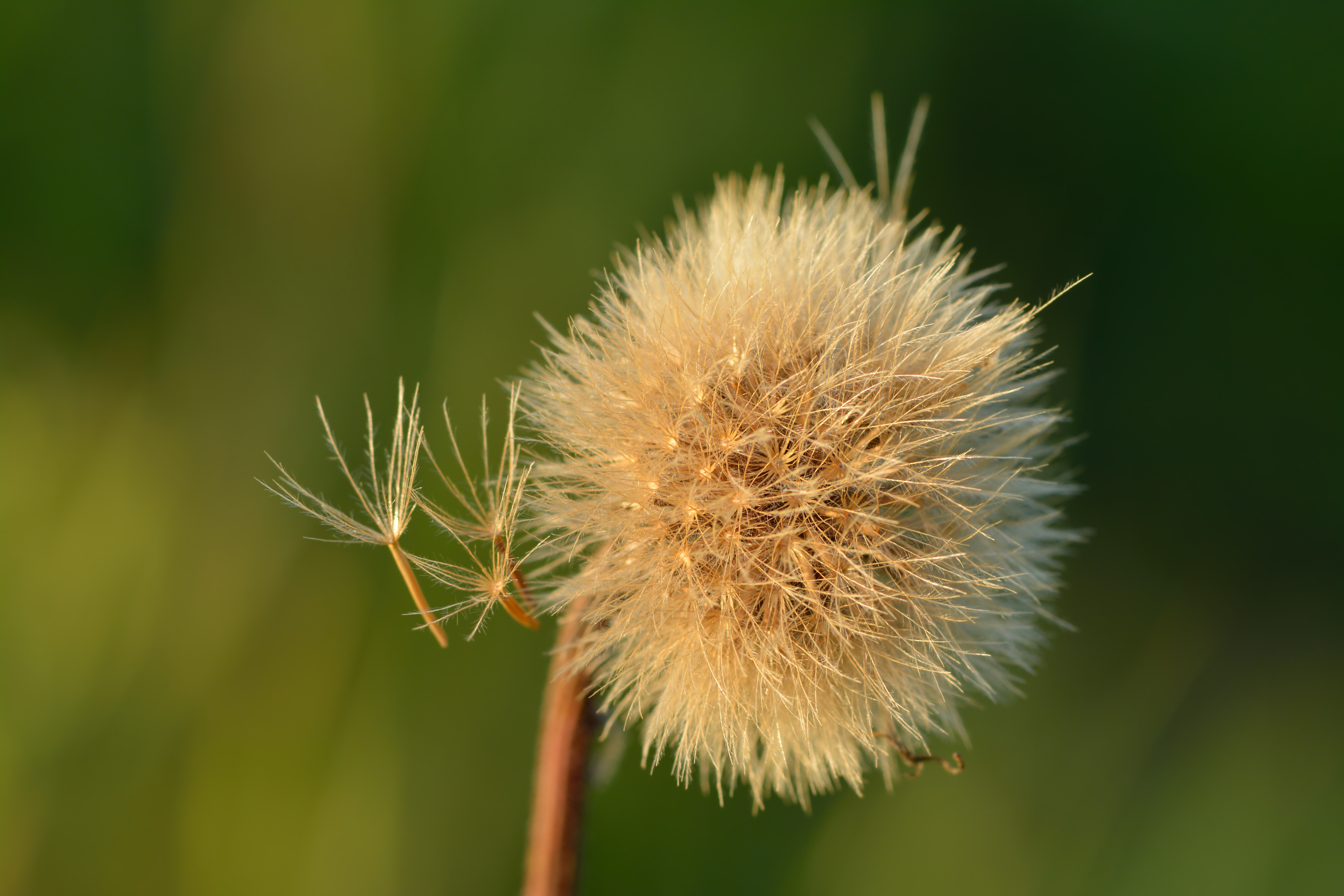
- Seed-head of Leontodon hispidus

Scientific classification
- Kingdom: Plantae
- Clade: Tracheophytes
- Clade: Angiosperms
- Clade: Eudicots
- Clade: Asterids
- Order: Asterales
- Family: Asteraceae
- Subfamily: Cichorioideae
- Tribe: Cichorieae
- Subtribe: Hypochaeridinae
- Genus: Leontodon; L.

Synonyms
- List: Antodon Neck.; Apargia Scop.; Asterothrix Cass.; Bohadschia F.W.Schmidt; Colobium Roth; Dens-leonis Ség.; Microderis DC.; Plancia Neck.; Streckera Sch.Bip.; Thrincia Roth.; Thrixa Dulac; Virea Adans.

= Leontodon =

Genus of flowering plants

Leontodon is a genus of plants in the tribe Cichorieae within the family Asteraceae, commonly known as hawkbits.

Their English name derives from the mediaeval belief that hawks ate the plant to improve their eyesight. Although originally only native to Eurasia and North Africa, some species have since become established in other countries, including the United States and New Zealand.

Recent research has shown that the genus Leontodon in the traditional delimitation is polyphyletic. Therefore, the former Leontodon subgenus Oporinia was raised to generic level. According to the nomenclatural rules the name Scorzoneroides has priority at generic level and therefore, the members of Leontodon subgenus Oporinia were transferred to the re-erected genus Scorzoneroides.

== Ecology ==
Seeds of Leontodon species are an important food source for certain bird species.

== Uses ==
In Crete, the roots of the species Leontodon tuberosus are eaten raw and its leaves are eaten steamed.

== Secondary metabolites ==
The genus Leontodon s.str. (i.e. excluding the members of the resurrected genus Scorzoneroides) is a rich source of hypocretenolides, unique guaiane type sesquiterpene lactones with a 12,5-lactone ring instead of the usual 12,6 lactone ring.

Phenolics found in Leontodon species include luteolin type flavonoids and caffeoyl quinic acid derivatives such as chlorogenic acid and 3,5-dicaffeoylquinic acid. Moreover, Leontodon species contain the caffeoyl tartaric acid derivatives caffeoyl tartaric acid and cichoric acid.

== Species ==
The following species are recognised in the genus Leontodon:

- Leontodon albanicus (F.K.Mey.) F.Conti
- Leontodon anomalus Ball
- Leontodon apulus (Fiori) Brullo
- Leontodon asperrimus (Willd.) Endl.
- Leontodon balansae Boiss.
- Leontodon berinii (Bartl.) Roth
- Leontodon biscutellifolius DC.
- Leontodon boryi Boiss. ex DC.
- Leontodon bourgaeanus Willk.
- Leontodon caroliaedoi Talavera & M.Talavera
- Leontodon × carreiroi (Gand.) M.Moura & L.Silva
- Leontodon caucasicus (M.Bieb.) Fisch.
- Leontodon crispus Vill.
- Leontodon djurdjurae Coss. & Durieu ex Batt. & Trab.
- Leontodon dubius (Hoppe) Poir.
- Leontodon eriopodus Emb. & Maire
- Leontodon farinosus Merino & Pau
- Leontodon filii (Hochst. ex Seub.) Paiva & Ormonde
- Leontodon × friasi M.Moura & Silva
- Leontodon graecus Boiss. & Heldr.
- Leontodon × grassiorum Zidorn
- Leontodon hellenicus Phitos
- Leontodon hirtus L.
- Leontodon hispidus L.
- Leontodon hochstetteri M.Moura & Silva
- Leontodon hyoseroides Welw. ex Rchb.
- Leontodon incanus (L.) Schrank
- Leontodon intermedius Huter, Porta & Rigo
- Leontodon kotschyi Boiss.
- Leontodon kulczynskii Popov
- Leontodon libanoticus Boiss.
- Leontodon longirostris (Finch & P.D.Sell) Talavera
- Leontodon maroccanus (Pers.) Ball
- Leontodon oxylepis Boiss. & Heldr.
- Leontodon pinetorum Pau
- Leontodon pitardii Maire
- Leontodon rigens (Aiton) Paiva & Ormonde
- Leontodon rosanoi (Ten.) DC.
- Leontodon saxatilis Lam.
- Leontodon siculus (Guss.) Nyman
- Leontodon stenocalathius Rech.f.
- Leontodon tenuiflorus (Gaudin) Rchb.
- Leontodon tingitanus (Boiss. & Reut.) Ball
- Leontodon tuberosus L.
- Leontodon × vegetus Finch & P.D.Sell
