= Anton Ortmann =

Anton Ortmann (19 March 1801 – 21 November 1861) was a Czech-Austrian pharmacist and botanist, known for his investigations of flora native to Bohemia, notably in the environs of Karlovy Vary and Loket.

== Life ==
Ortman was born on 19 March 1801 in Planá near České Budějovice, Bohemia. During his career, he worked as a pharmacist in Karlsbad (now Karlovy Vary) and later Elbogen (now Loket; since 1842). From 1857 to 1861 he served as mayor of Elbogen. He died in Elbogen on 21 November 1861.

Historically, numerous new genera were named to honor him; Ortmannia Opiz, 1834; Ortmannia Rathbun, 1901; Ortmannia de Loriol, 1906; Ortmannia Schrammen, 1924; Ortmannia Chiesa, Parma & Camacho, 1995; Ortmanniana Frierson, 1927; Ortmannicus Fowler, 1911; Ortmannispongia Schrammen, 1936; however, only the last three are still valid names as of 2024.

== Publications ==
- Beobachtungen über einige Pflanzen, welche in der Umgebung von Karlsbad oder in Böhmen überhaupt vorkommen, in: Allgemeine Botanische Zeitung 18, (1835).
- Flora Carlsbadensis, in: L. Fleckle, Karlsbad, (1838).
- Flora des Elbogner Kreises im Königreich Böhmen, (1842) – Flora of the Elbogen circle in the Kingdom of Bohemia.
- Die Flora von Karlsbad, in: Der Führer in Karlsbad und der Umgegend, (5th edition, 1850) – The flora of Karlsbad.
