= Maria Tallant Owen =

American botanist

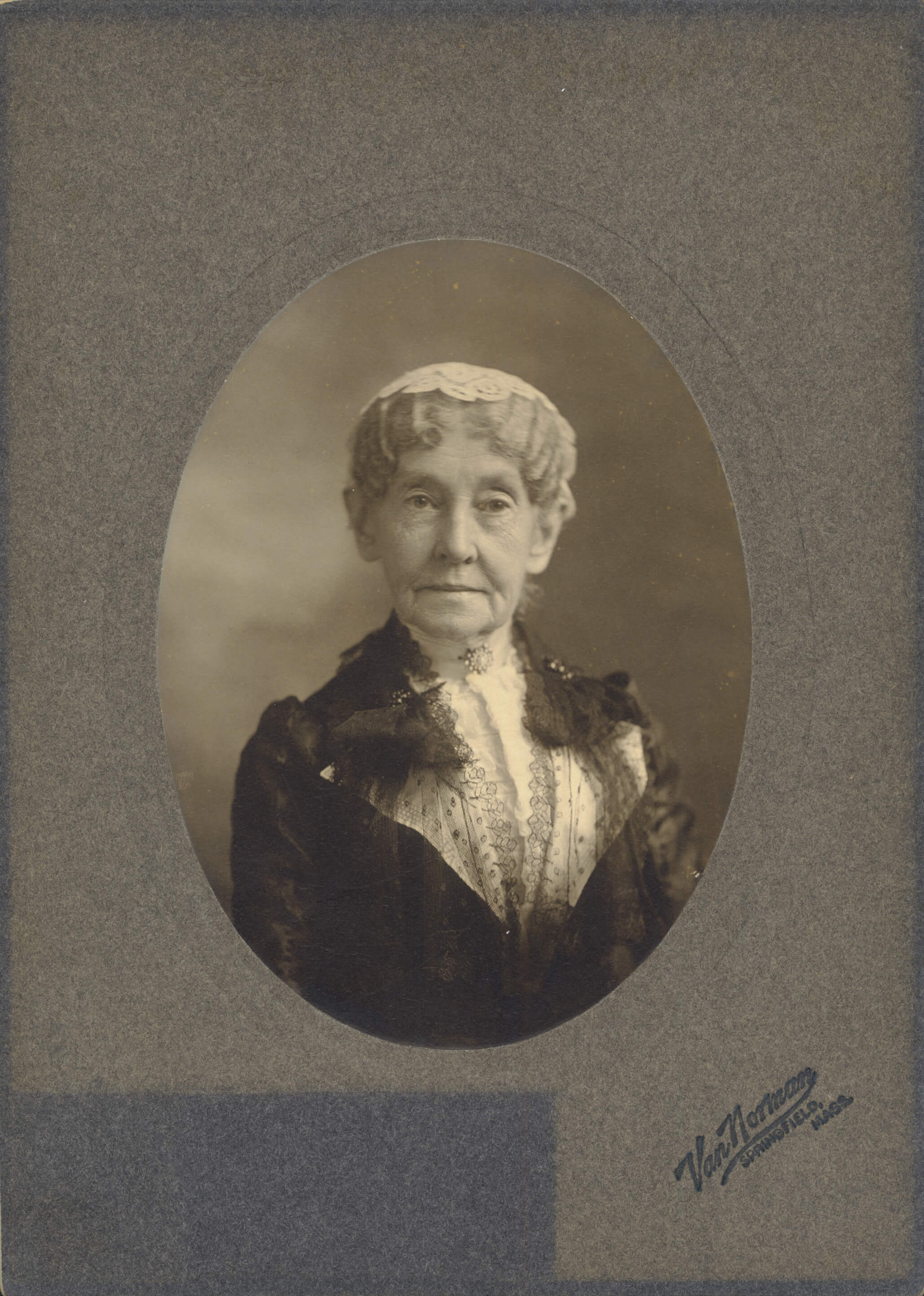
- Born: Maria Tallant; February 13, 1825; Nantucket, Massachusetts
- Died: June 8, 1913 (aged 88); Plandome, New York
- Occupation: Botanist
- Spouse: Varillas L. Owen
- Children: Walter (son), Amelia (daughter)

Maria Tallant Owen (February 13, 1825 – June 8, 1913) was an American botanist who compiled a detailed record of 19th century flora and algae on Nantucket Island in Massachusetts.

== Early life and education ==
Born Maria Tallant in Nantucket, she grew up in a wealthy family and was descended from some of the earliest white settlers of the Massachusetts Bay Colony. She studied at private institutions on the island and studied botany at home with her mother and sisters, who were also avid collectors. She taught at the Perkins School for the Blind and Nantucket High School in the 1840s, and also taught at her own private school.

== Research ==
Owen moved to Springfield, Massachusetts in 1853, shortly after her marriage to Dr. Varillas L. Owen who was a Harvard-trained physician. The couple had two children, Walter and Amelia.

In Springfield, she contributed to scientific societies and taught science and French. Owen's most significant work, published in 1888, was a record of flora in pre-1853 Nantucket County that included 787 species and is a useful record for modern scientists studying the effects of climate change on plants. On her European excursions, Owen expanded her botanical collections to include specimens she found there.

According to Smith, Owen is quoted as saying, "I owe half the happiness of my life directly, and most of the other half indirectly, to the study of botany..."

Owen was instrumental in the founding of two botanical societies, the Connecticut Valley Botanical Society and the Springfield Botanical Society. She helped organize the first in 1873 and served as its secretary. The group remained viable for about 25 years, and held its first annual meeting in Amherst, Massachusetts on October 1, 1873. The Springfield Botanical Society was established in 1877 and consisted of weekly meetings with members contributing specimens from near and far for their own herbarium. Owen was president of this group for many years and known as its honorary president until she died.

Owen continued her botanical research until 1912, a year before her death. She died at her daughter's home in Plandome, on Long Island in New York.

== Works ==
- Nantucket plants. Bull. Torrey Bot. Club (1872) 6:330.
- Catalogue of plants growing without cultivation on the Island of Nantucket, 38–47. In: Edward K. Godfrey, the Island of Nantucket, What it was and what it is. Boston: Lee and Shepard, 1882.
- Notes on Corma Conradii, Bull. Torrey Bot. Club (1884) 11:117.
- A catalogue of plants growing without cultivation in the county of Nantucket, Mass. Gazette Printing Company, 1888.
- Tillaea Simplex. Bot. Gazette (1895) 20: 80–81.
- The Connecticut Valley Botanical Society. Rhodora (1899)1:95-96
- Ferns of Mt. Toby, Massachusetts. Rhodora (1901) 3:41-43
- The early work of the Springfield Botanical Society. (1907) 4 p. unnumbered. In: The Thirtieth Annual Report of the Springfield Botanical Society, Springfield, Mass.
- The three adventive heaths of Nantucket, Massachusetts. Rhodora (1908) 10:173-179.
- Frederick William Batchelder. Rhodora (1912) 14: 41–45.
- Tillaea in Nantucket. Rhodora (1912) 14: 201-2014

== Notes ==
The standard author abbreviation Owen is used to indicate this person as the author when citing a botanical name.
