= August Neilreich =

Austrian lawyer and botanist (1803–1871)

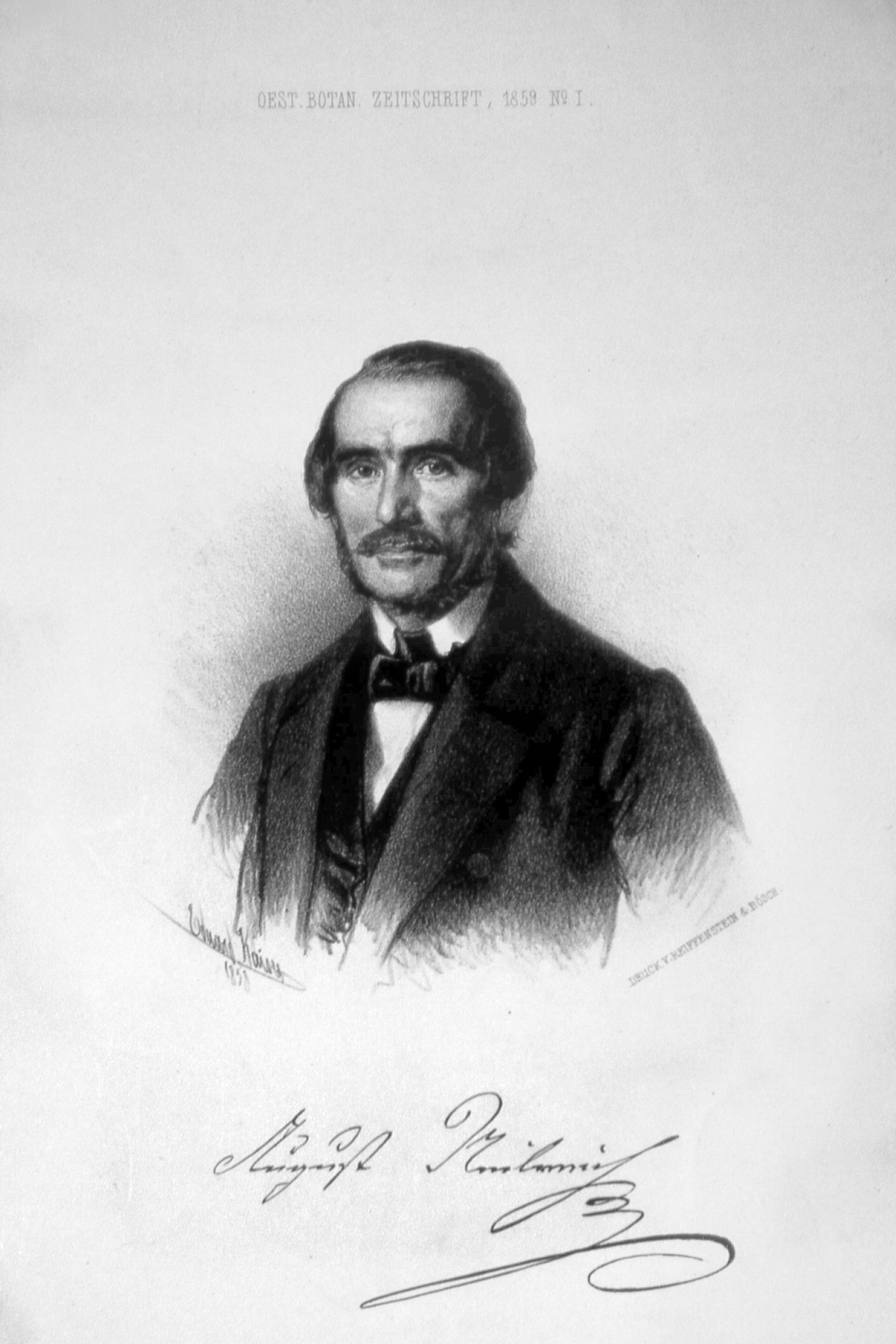
August Neilreich

August Neilreich (12 December 1803 – 1 June 1871) was an Austrian lawyer and botanist.

== Life and career ==
Neilreichwas born on 12 December 1803 in Vienna. He studied law at the University of Vienna, eventually attaining the position of Oberlandesgericht Rath. At the age of 53 he was forced into early retirement from the legal profession due to illness.

As a young man, he was inspired by the botanical work of Ludwig Ritter von Köchel (1800-1877). Although he is largely known for investigations of flora native to Vienna and Lower Austria, he published works on plants found throughout the Austrian Empire.

The plant genus Neilreichia was named in his honour by Eduard Fenzl (1808–1879). His name is also associated with the species Asperula neilreichii (Eastern Alps-Meier).

== Selected writings ==
- Flora von Wien, etc. 1846 - Flora of Vienna.
- Flora von Nieder-Oesterreich, 1859 - Flora of Lower Austria.
- Nachträge zur Flora von Nieder-Oesterreich, 1866 - Supplement to the flora of Lower Austria.
- Aufzählung der in Ungarn und Slavonien bisher beobachteten Gefässpflanzen, 1866 - Enumeration of previously observed vascular plants of Hungary and Slavonia .
- — (1868). Die Vegetationsverhältnisse von Croatien [The Vegetation Conditions of Croatia] (in German). Vienna: Braumüller.
- — (n.d.) [read 1869-10-06]. Nachträge zu den Vegetationsverhältnisse von Croatien veranlasst durch die Flora croatica von Schlosser und Vukotinović [Additions to The Vegetation Conditions of Croatia] (in German). Vienna. pp. 765–830. doi:10.5962/bhl.title.9935. Originally published within another work.
