= Norman C. Melvin III =

Botanist and plant ecologist

Norman C. Melvin III (born July 11, 1950) is a botanist and plant ecologist.

== Education and career ==
In South Carolina, Melvin graduated in 1973 from Presbyterian College with B.S. in biology and in 1976 from Clemson University with M.S. in botany. In 1980 he received his Ph.D. in botany from Ohio's Miami University. From 1980 to 1990 he was an associate professor of biology and chair of the biology department at St. Andrews Presbyterian College in North Carolina. From 1990 to 1995 he was employed in Laurel, Maryland as a State Plant Ecologist by the USDA's Natural Resource Conservation Service (NRCS). From 1995 to 2004 he was a botanist/plant ecologist at the NCRS Wetland Science Institute (which the NRCS created in 1994). While he worked at the Wetland Science Institute, he was also an adjunct professor at both the University of Maryland, College Park and Johns Hopkins University in Baltimore. In 2004 the NCRS underwent reorganization and replaced the Wetland Science Institute by the Wetland Technology Development Team (located in Fort Worth, Texas). In 2004 Melvin was appointed the Leader of the Wetland Technology Development Team and held the appointment until he retired in March 2018. As Team Leader, he served as the national representative of the NCRS on issues related to the botany and ecology of wetlands.

He is a member of the Society of Wetland Scientists, Association of Southeastern Biologists, and the Southern Appalachian Botanical Society and has presented papers at society meetings and symposia, authored publications in professional journals, and written technical articles for the NRCS.

== Selected publications ==
- Melvin Iii, Norman C. (1977). "The New Combination Leucothoë walteri (Willd.) Melvin". Castanea. 42 (4): 304–308. JSTOR 4032611.
- Lichvar, Robert W.; Melvin, Norman C.; Butterwick, Mary L.; Kirchner, William N. (2012). National wetland plant list indicator rating definitions (PDF). No. ERDC/CRREL-TN-12-1. Cold Regions Research and Engineering Lab, U.S. Army Engineer Research and Development Center, Hanover NH.
- Judd, Walter S.; Melvin, Norman C.; Waselkov, Katherine; Kron, Kathleen A. (2012). "Taxonomic revision of Eubotrys (Ericaceae, Gaultherieae)". Brittonia. 64 (2): 165–178. Bibcode:2012Britt..64..165J. doi:10.1007/s12228-011-9226-9. S2CID 27754970.
- Judd, Walter S.; Melvin, Norman C.; Waselkov, Katherine; Kron, Kathleen A. (2013). "A taxonomic revision of Leucothoë (Ericaceae; Tribe Gaultherieae)". Brittonia. 65 (4): 417–438. Bibcode:2013Britt..65..417J. doi:10.1007/s12228-012-9295-4. S2CID 39427810.
- Lichvar, R. W.; Banks, D. L.; Kirchner, W. N.; Melvin, N. C. (2016). "The national wetland plant list: 2016 wetland ratings" (PDF). Phytoneuron. 30: 1–17.
