= Ennafa Nikitina =

Soviet Russian botanist (1893–1976)

Ennafa Vasilievna Nikitina (24 November 1893, Tomsk – 1 June 1975, Frunze) was a Soviet botanist, taxonomist of higher plants and specialist in the flora of Kyrgyzstan. She was an Honored Scientist of Kyrgyz SSR and an author of more than 80 scientific papers, including four monographs.

== Early life and education ==
Ennafa Nikitina was born on 24 November in Tomsk in a family of employees. In 1916, she graduated from the Higher Courses for Women in Tomsk, receiving a diploma from the Russian University. After graduation, Nikitina taught at Tomsk University and began research activities there.

== Career ==
In 1927, Nikitina together with her husband Ivan Vykhodtsev came from Tomsk to the laboratory of systematics of higher plants in Kyrgyz SSR. They laid the foundation for the systematic study of the country's vegetation cover. From the very first days of her stay in the republic, Nikitina took an active part in the development of botanical science, linking her interest in science with the needs of agriculture.

Nikitina established the Department of Botany at the Zootechnical Institute after which she was awarded the PhD degree in Biological Sciences without defending a thesis in 1936. In 1932-1938 she carried out extensive research on the study of the vegetation of forage lands.

Nikitina stood at the origins of E. Gareyev Botanical Gardens of the National Academy of Sciences of the Kyrgyz Republic. During the World War II Nikitina headed the Frunze Botanical Garden and the biological department of the Science Committee under the Council of People's Commissars of the Kyrgyz SSR.

Since 1946 she was a Director of the Institute of Biology of the Kyrgyz Academy of Sciences. In 1952–1965, under the leadership of Nikitina, the fundamental 11-volume regional monograph Flora of the Kyrgyz SSR was created.

Five Ph.D. theses were defended under Nikitina's supervision.

Ennafa Nikitina died on 1 June 1975 in Frunze (now Bishkek).

She is one of the heroines of the book Daughters of Kyrgyz Land by Bishkek journalist and writer Kulbyubu Bekturganova.

The standard author abbreviation Nikitina is used to indicate this person as the author when citing a botanical name.

== Awards ==
- Order of Lenin
- Order of the Badge of Honor
- Two Diplomas of the Presidium of the Supreme Soviet of the Kyrgyz SSR
- Honored Scientist of the Kyrgyz SSR

== Selected works ==
- Flora of the Kirghiz SSR (in co-authorship). Frunze, "Ilim", 1946–1965, 1 - 11 volumes, 1-2: Supplements, 1969–1970.
- Wild medicinal plants of Kyrgyzstan. Frunze, 1946.
- Poisonous and harmful plants of pastures and hayfields of Kyrgyzstan. Frunze, 1950.
- Flora and vegetation of pastures and hayfields of the Kyrgyz Ala-Too ridge. Frunze, 1962.
- Wormwoods of Kyrgyzstan and their economic values. Frunze, 1964.

== Plants named after Nikitina ==
- Astragalus nikitinae B. Fedtsch ., 1946
- Delphinium nikitinae PACHOM., 1972
- Otostegia nikitinae SCHARASCH., 1958
- Stipa nikitinae TZVELEV, 2012
