= Hermann von Nördlinger =

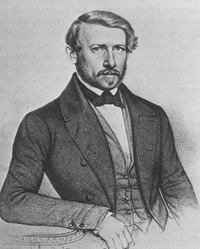
Hermann von Nördlinger

Hermann von Nördlinger (13 August 1818 – 19 January 1897), was a German forester, botanist, and entomologist.

Nördlinger was a professor of sylviculture and Inspector of Forests at the University of Hohenheim in Württemberg. Nördlinger collaborated with a number of French botanists. From 1859 to 1870, he was editor of the forestry and hunting journal Kritische Blätter für Forst- und Jagdwissenschaft.

== Publications ==
- 1855: Die Kleinen Feinde der Landwirthschaft. S.G. Cotta'scher Verlag, Stuttgart
- 1856: Nachträge zu Ratzeburg's Forstinsekten. J. Weise, Stuttgart
- 1860: Die technischen Eigenschaften der Holzer fur Forst- und Baubeamte, Technologen und Gewerbtreibende. J.G. Cotta'scher Verlag. Stuttgart.

In the years 1851 to 1888 he published three exsiccata-like series of wood cross sections, one of them under the title Querschnitte von hundert Holzarten, umfassend die Wald- und Gartenbauarten, sowie die gewöhnlichsten ausländischen Boskethölzer Deutschlands. Zur Belehrung für Botaniker, Forstleute und Holztechnologen. The notable series issued by Nördlinger are found in several xylotheques.
