= Adolf Osterwalder =

Swiss zymologist and wine bacteriologist

Adolf Osterwalder (11 March 1872, in Kümmertshausen – 14 March 1961, in Wädenswil) was a Swiss zymologist and wine bacteriologist.

He studied natural sciences at Lausanne and Zürich, receiving his doctorate in 1898 with the dissertation Beiträge zur Embryologie von Aconitum Napellus L ("Contributions to the embryology of Aconitum napellus"). After graduation, he worked as an assistant plant pathologist and fermentation physiologist under Hermann Müller-Thurgau at the experimental institute in Wädenswil. In 1917 he attained the post of deputy director.

In 1903, he became a member of the Naturforschenden Gesellschaft in Zürich. Many of his scientific papers were published in the Zentralblatt für Bakteriologie and the Landwirtschaftliches Jahrbuch der Schweiz.

== Selected works ==
- Die Bakterien im Wein und Obstwein und die dadurch verursachten Veränderungen (with Hermann Müller-Thurgau, 1913) – Bacteria in wine and fruit wine, and the changes caused by it.
- Krankheiten der Obstbäume und des Beerenobstes, 1928 – Diseases of fruit trees and berry fruits.
- Von Kaltgärhefen und Kaltgärung, 1934 – On cold fermentation yeasts and cold fermentation.
- Anwendung und Vermehrung der Reinhefe, 1937 – Application and propagation of pure yeast.
- Pilzkrankheiten und tierische Feinde an Gemüsepflanzen und deren Bekämpfung (with Robert Wiesmann, 1939) – Fungal diseases and animal enemies of vegetables and their control.
