= José Eduardo Martins Ormonde =

Portuguese botanist (1943–2004)

- Born: 28 April 1943; Terceira, Azores
- Died: 1 December 2004 (aged 61); Coimbra
- Occupation: Botanist
- Known for: work with ferns and Azorean flora

José Eduardo Martins Ormonde was a Portuguese botanist and botanical illustrator.
