= List of botanists by author abbreviation (P) =

This is an incomplete list of botanists by their author abbreviation, which is designed for citation with the botanical names or works that they have published. This list follows that established by Brummitt & Powell (1992). Use of that list is recommended by Rec. 46A Note 1 of the International Code of Nomenclature for algae, fungi, and plants. The list is kept up to date online at The International Plant Names Index and Index Fungorum.

In some cases an "author abbreviation" consists of a full surname, while in other cases the surname is abbreviated and/or accompanied by one or more initials. There is no space between the initials and the surname (or its abbreviation).

==== Order of entries ====
The list here is maintained strictly in order of the alphabetic characters in the abbreviation; thus "A.B.Jacks." appears under "A" not "J", and is located as if the characters were "ABJACKS". Capitalization is ignored as are all non-alphabetic characters such as "." and space. Diacritical marks are also ignored, so that, e.g., "ü" is treated as if it were "u".

==== Navigation ====
Because of its length, the list is split across separate pages. All alphabetic sections can be accessed from the short table of contents; the vertical bars show the page divisions. Searching will only find an entry within a page.

== A–O ==
Contents:	A	B	C	D	E F	G	H	I J	K L	M	N O	P	Q R	S	T U V	W X Y Z

To find entries for A–O, use the table of contents above.

== P ==
Contents: Top	A	B	C	D	E F	G	H	I J	K L	M	N O	P	Q R	S	T U V	W X Y Z

- P.Aa – Pierrot Van der Aa (fl. 2022)
- Pabst – Guido Frederico João Pabst (1914–1980)
- Paclt – Jiří Paclt (1925–2015)
- P.A.Collier – Philip A. Collier (fl. 2017)
- P.A.Cox – Paul Alan Cox (born 1953)
- Paczk. – Grazyna Paczkowska (born 1965)
- P.A.Dang. – Pierre Augustin Dangeard (1862–1947)
- Pagan – Francisco Mariano Pagan (1896–1942)
- P.A.Gilbert – Percy Albert Gilbert (1883–1960)
- Paine – John Alsop Paine (1840–1912)
- Painter – William Hunt Painter (1835–1910)
- Palassou – Pierre Bernard Palassou (1745–1830)
- Paláu – Antonio Paláu y Verdera (1734–1793)
- Palez. – Philippe de Palézieux (1871–1957)
- Palib. – Ivan Vladimirovich Palibin (1872–1949)
- Pall. – Peter Simon von Pallas (1741–1811)
- Palla – Eduard Palla (1864–1922)
- Pallith. – Joseph Pallithanam (1915–1984)
- P.Allorge – Pierre Allorge (1891–1944)
- Palm – Björn Torvald Palm (1887–1956)
- Palmberg – Johannes Olai Palmberg (1640–1691)
- Palmer – Edward Palmer (1829–1911)
- Palmgr. – Alvar Palmgren (1880–1960)
- Pamp. – Renato Pampanini (1875–1949)
- Pamplin – William Pamplin (1806–1899)
- Pancher – Jean Armand Isidore Pancher (1814–1877)
- Pančić – Josif Pančić (1814–1888)
- Pandé – S. K. Pandé (1899–1960)
- Pandeir. – Mariana Sofia Pandeirada (born 1990)
- Pander – Heinz Christian Pander (1794–1865)
- Pando – Francisco Pando (born 1962)
- Panero – José L. Panero (born 1959)
- Panfet – Cristina Mercedes Panfet Valdés (born 1957)
- Pangalo – Konstantin Ivanovič Pangalo (1883–1965)
- Paniagua – Narel Y. Paniagua-Zambrana (born 1973)
- Panigrahi – Gopinath Panigrahi (1924–2004)
- Panizzi – Francesco Panizzi (1817–1893)
- Panjutin – Platon Sergeevich Panjutin (1889–1946)
- Pankow – Helmut Pankow (1929–1996)
- Pannell – Caroline M. Pannell (fl. 1982)
- Panov – P. P. Panov (born 1932)
- Pansche – Adolf Pansche (1841–1887)
- Pant. – Jószef Pantocsek (1846–1916)
- Pantaz. – Andriana Pantazidou (born 1955)
- Panter – Jacqueline Anne Panter (born 1945)
- Panthaki – Dhun Phiroze Panthaki (born 1933)
- Pantl. – Robert Pantling (1856–1910)
- Panțu – Zacharia C. Panțu (1866–1934)
- Panz. – Georg Wolfgang Franz Panzer (1755–1829)
- Paol. – Giulio Paoletti (1865–1941)
- Papan. – Konstantinos Papanicolaou (born 1947)
- Pappe – Karl Wilhelm Ludwig Pappe (1803–1862)
- Parijs – J. P. Parijs
- Paris – Jean Édouard Gabriel Narcisse Paris (1827–1911)
- Parish – Samuel Bonsall Parish (1838–1928)
- Parkinson – Sydney Parkinson (c. 1745–1771)
- Parl. – Filippo Parlatore (1816–1877)
- Parm. – Antoine Auguste Parmentier (1737–1813)
- Parn. – Richard Parnell (1810–1882)
- P.Arnold – Paula Arnold (fl. 1972)
- Parodi – Lorenzo Raimundo Parodi (1895–1966)
- Parr-Sm. – Geoffrey A. Parr-Smith (fl. 1984)
- Parry – Charles Christopher Parry (1823–1890)
- Pascher – Adolf Pascher (1881–1945)
- Pasq. – Giuseppe Antonio Pasquale (1820–1893)
- Pass. – Giovanni Passerini (1816–1893)
- Passarge – Otto Karl Siegfried Passarge (1867–1958)
- Passy – Antoine François Passy (1792–1873)
- Pasteur – Louis Pasteur (1822–1895)
- Pastore – Ada I. Pastore (1906–1952)
- Pat. – Narcisse Théophile Patouillard (1854–1926)
- Patel – M. K. Patel (fl. 1949)
- Paterson – William Paterson (1755–1810)
- Paton – Jean Annette Paton (born 1929)
- Patraw – Pauline Mead Patraw (fl. 1936)
- Patrin – Eugène Louis Melchior Patrin (1742–1815)
- Patt. – Harry Norton Patterson (1853–1919)
- Pau – Carlos Pau (1857–1937)
- Paul G.Wilson – Paul Graham Wilson (1928–2024)
- Paulsen – Ove Paulsen (1874–1947)
- Paunero – Elena Paunero Ruiz (1906–2009)
- Paust – Susan Paust (born 1949)
- Pav. – José Antonio Pavón Jiménez (1754–1844)
- Pavlick – Leon E. Pavlick (1939–2003)
- Pavlov – Nikolai Vasilievich Pavlov (1893–1971)
- Pavlova – Nina Mikhailovna Pavlova (1897–1973)
- Pavol. – Angiolo Ferdinando Pavolini (fl. 1908)
- Pawł. – Bogumił Pawłowski (1898–1971)
- Pax – Ferdinand Albin Pax (1858–1942)
- Paxton – Joseph Paxton (1803–1865)
- Payens – Joannes Petrus Dominicus Wilhelmus Payens (born 1928)
- Payer – Jean-Baptiste Payer (1818–1860)
- Payson – Edwin Blake Payson (1893–1927)
- Pazij – Vera Kondratyevna Pazij (1909–1992)
- P.B.Adams – P. B. Adams (fl. 1978)
- P.Balzer – Peter Balzer (fl. 2011)
- P.Beauv. – Ambroise Marie François Joseph Palisot de Beauvois (1752–1820)
- P.Biju – Punnakot Biju (born 1975)
- P.Browne – Patrick Browne (1720–1790)
- P.Candargy – Paléologos C. Candargy (born 1870)
- P.C.Boyce – Peter Charles Boyce (born 1964)
- P.C.de Jong – Piet C. de Jong (fl. 1976)
- P.Chai – Paul P. K. Chai (fl. 1996)
- P.C.Kanjilal – Praphulla Chandra Kanjilal (1886–1972)
- P.C.Li – Pei Chun Li (fl. 1981)
- P.C.Pant – P. C. Pant (born 1936)
- P.Cruchet – Paul Cruchet (1875–1964)
- P.C.S.Kumar – P.C. Suresh Kumar (born 1953)
- P.Daniel – Pitchai Daniel (born 1943)
- P.D.Cantino – Philip Douglas Cantino (born 1948)
- P. de B. – Ambroise Marie François Joseph Palisot de Beauvois (1752–1820)
- P.de la Varde – Robert André Léopold Potier de la Varde (1878–1961)
- P.Delforge – Pierre Delforge (born 1945)
- P.D.Orton – Peter Darbishire Orton (1916–2005)
- P.D.Sell – Peter Derek Sell (1929–2013)
- P.D.Sørensen – Paul Davidson Sørensen (born 1934)
- Pearl – Raymond Pearl (1879–1940)
- Pearse – Arthur Sperry Pearse (1877–1956)
- Pearson – William Henry Pearson (1849–1923)
- Pease – Arthur Stanley Pease (1881–1964)
- Peattie – Donald C. Peattie (1898–1964)
- P.E.Barnes – P.E. Barnes (fl. 1931)
- P.E.Berry – Paul Edward Berry (born 1952)
- Peck – Charles Horton Peck (1833–1917)
- Peckham – Ethel Anson Peckham (1879–1965)
- Peckoit – Gustav Peckoit (1861–1923)
- Peckolt – Theodor Peckolt (1822–1912)
- Pěčková – Milena Pěčková (fl. 1990)
- Peckover – Ralph Peckover (fl. 1992)
- Pedersen – Troels Myndel Pedersen (1916–2000)
- Pedley – Leslie Pedley (1930–2018)
- Pedro – José Gomes Pedro (1915–2010)
- Peebles – Robert Hibbs Peebles (1900–1955)
- P.E.Gibbs – Peter Edward Gibbs (born 1938)
- Peiger – Maroš Peiger (fl. 2024)
- Peirce – George James Peirce (1868–1954)
- Peiris – Gayan Prasanga Peiris (fl. 2023)
- Pellegr. – François Pellegrin (1881–1965)
- Pelloe – Emily Harriet Pelloe (1878–1941)
- Pellow – Belinda Pellow (born 1956)
- Pelser – Pieter B. Pelser (fl. 2005)
- Penh. – David Pearce Penhallow (1854–1910)
- Penn. – Leigh Humboldt Pennington (1877–1929)
- Penneys – Darin S. Penneys (fl. 2004–2018)
- Pennant – Thomas Pennant (1726–1798)
- Pennell – Francis Whittier Pennell (1886–1952)
- Penny – George Penny (died 1838)
- Penz. – Albert Julius Otto Penzig (1856–1929)
- Pépin – Pierre Denis Pépin (c. 1802–1876)
- Perch-Nielsen – Katharina Perch-Nielsen
- Percival – John Percival (1863–1949)
- Perdue – Robert Edward Perdue Jr. (1924–2011)
- Pereda – José María Pereda (1909–1972)
- Perkins – Janet Russell Perkins (1853–1933)
- Perktold – Josef Anton Perktold (1804–1870)
- Perleb – Karl Julius Perleb (1794–1845)
- Perr. – George Samuel Perrottet (1793–1870)
- Perrie – Leon R. Perrie (fl. 2003)
- Perrier – Alfred Perrier (1809–1866)
- Perrine – Henry Perrine (1797–1840)
- Perry – Matthew Calbraith Perry (1794–1858)
- Pers. – Christiaan Hendrik Persoon (1761–1836)
- Perss. – Nathan Petter Herman Persson (1893–1978)
- Perty – Josef (Joseph) Anton Maximillian Perty (1804–1884)
- Peschkova – Galina A. Peschkova (1930–2018)
- Pescott – Edward Edgar Pescott (1872-1954)
- Petagna – Vincenzo Petagna (1734–1810)
- Pételot – Paul Alfred Pételot (1885–after 1940)
- Peter – (Gustav) Albert Peter (1853–1937)
- Peter B.Adams – Peter Barry Adams (fl. 1995)
- Peter G.Wilson – Peter Gordon Wilson (born 1950)
- Peterm. – Wilhelm Ludwig Petermann (1806–1855)
- Peters – Wilhelm Karl Hartwig Peters (1815–1883)
- Petoe – Peter Petoe (fl. 2018)
- Petr. – Franz Petrak (1886–1973)
- Petrie – Donald Petrie (1846–1925)
- Petrov – Vsevolod Alexeevič Petrov (1896–1955)
- Petrovič – Sava Petrovič (1839–1889)
- Petry – Arthur Petry (1858–1932)
- Petz. – Carl Edward Adolph Petzold (1815–1891)
- Peyerimh. – Paul de Peyerimhoff de Fontenelle (1873–1957)
- Peyr. – Johann Joseph Peyritsch (1835–1889)
- Pfahl – Jay Charles Pfahl (born 1953)
- Pfeff. – Wilhelm Pfeffer (1845–1920)
- Pfeiff. – Louis (Ludwig) Karl Georg Pfeiffer (1805–1877)
- Pfeil – Friedrich Wilhelm Leopold Pfeil (1783–1859)
- Pfennig – Horst Pfennig (1933–1994)
- P.F.Hunt – Peter Francis Hunt (1936–2013)
- Pfiester – Lois Ann Pfiester (1936–1992)
- Pfitzer – Ernst Hugo Heinrich Pfitzer (1846–1906)
- P.F.Maycock – Paul F. Maycock (1930–2012)
- Pfosser – Martin Pfosser (fl. 2003)
- P.Fourn. – Paul Victor Fournier (1877–1964)
- P.F.Stevens – Peter F. Stevens (born 1944)
- P.Geissler – Patricia Geissler (1947–2000)
- P.G.Neish – Peter G. Neish (fl. 2000)
- P.H.Allen – Paul H. Allen (1911–1963)
- P.Halliday – Patricia Halliday (1930–2019)
- P.H.Davis – Peter Hadland Davis (1918–1992)
- P.Hein – Peter Hein (born 1962)
- P.H.Hô – Pham-Hoàng Hô (1929–2017)
- Phil. – Rodolfo Amando Philippi (1808–1904)
- Philcox – David Philcox (1926–2003)
- Philippe – Xavier Philippe (1802–1866)
- Philipson – William Raymond Philipson (1911–1997)
- Phillippe – Loy R. Phillippe (fl. 1989)
- Phillipps – Anthea Phillipps (fl. 1982)
- Phipps – Constantine John Phipps (1744–1792)
- Phoebus – Philipp Phoebus (1804–1880)
- P.H.Raven – Peter Hamilton Raven (1936–2026)
- Phukan – Sandhyajyoti Phukan (born 1950)
- P.H.Weston – Peter Henry Weston (born 1956)
- Pichon – Marcel Pichon (1921–1954)
- Pickering – Charles Pickering (1805–1878)
- Pickersgill – Barbara Pickersgill (born 1940)
- Pickett – Fermen Layton Pickett (1881–1940)
- Pickford – Grace Evelyn Pickford (1902–1986)
- Pic.Serm. – Rodolfo Emilio Giuseppe Pichi Sermolli (1912–2005)
- Pierrat – Dominique Pierrat (1820–1893)
- Pierre – Jean Baptiste Louis Pierre (1833–1905)
- P.I.Forst. – Paul Irwin Forster (born 1961)
- Pignatti – Sandro Pignatti (born 1930)
- Pigott – Donald Pigott (1928–2022)
- Piippo – Sinikka Piippo (born 1955)
- Pilát – Albert Pilát (1903–1974)
- Pilg. – Robert Knud Friedrich Pilger (1876–1953)
- Pillans – Neville Stuart Pillans (1884–1964)
- Pillon – Yohan Pillon (fl. 2007)
- Pilous – Zdeněk Pilous (1912–2000)
- P.I.Mao – Pin I Mao (born 1925)
- Pimentel – Reynold B. Pimentel (fl. 2017)
- Pimenov – Michael Georgievich Pimenov (born 1937)
- Pinchot – Gifford Pinchot (1865–1946)
- Pinkava – Donald John Pinkava (1933–2017)
- Piper – Charles Vancouver Piper (1867–1926)
- Pipoly – John J. Pipoly III (born 1955)
- Pirani – José Rubens Pirani (born 1958)
- Piré – Louis Alexandre Henri Joseph Piré (1827–1887)
- Pires – João Murça Pires (1916–1994)
- Pires-O'Brien – Maria Joaquina Pires-O'Brien (born 1953)
- Pirone – Pascal Pompey Pirone (1907–2003)
- Pirotta – Pietro Romualdo Pirotta (1853–1936)
- Pisano – Edmundo Pisano (1919–1997)
- Piso – Willem (Guilielmus, Guilherme) Piso (Pies) (1611–1678)
- Pišút – Ivan Pišút (1935–2017)
- Pit. – Charles-Joseph Marie Pitard (1873–1927)
- Pitcher – Zina Pitcher (1797–1872)
- Pittendr. – Colin Pittendrigh (1918-1996)
- Pittier – Henri François Pittier (1857–1950)
- P.J.Adey – Patricia J. Adey (born 1936)
- P.James – Peter Wilfred James (1930–2014)
- P.J.Bergius – Peter Jonas Bergius (1730–1790)
- P.J.Braun – Pierre Josef Braun (born 1959)
- P.J.Cribb – Phillip James Cribb (born 1946)
- P.J.H.Hurter – P.J.H. Hurter (fl. 1995)
- P.J.Lang – Peter J. Lang (born 1955)
- P.J.L.Dang. – Pierre Jean Louis Dangeard (1895–1970)
- P.J.Müll. – Philipp Jakob Müller (1832–1889)
- P.J.Sm. – P.J. Smith (fl. 1986)
- P.J.Spence – Philip John Spence (born 1940)
- P.Karst. – Petter Adolf Karsten (1834–1917)
- P.K.Endress – Peter Karl Endress (born 1942)
- P.K.Holmgren – Patricia Kern Holmgren (born 1940)
- P.K.Hsiao – Pei Ken Hsiao (born 1931)
- P.K.Sarkar – Priyabrata K. Sarkar (born 1929)
- P.Kumm. – Paul Kummer (1834–1912)
- P.Küpfer – Philippe Küpfer (born 1942)
- Planch. – Jules Émile Planchon (1823–1888)
- Planchuelo – Ana María Planchuelo (born 1945)
- Playford – Geoffrey Playford (fl. 1981)
- Plaz – Anton Wilhelm Plaz (1708–1784)
- Plée – Auguste Plée (1787–1825)
- Plowman – Timothy Charles Plowman (1944–1989)
- Plowr. – Charles Bagge Plowright (1849–1910)
- P.L.Perry – Pauline Lesley Perry (born 1927)
- Pluk. – Leonard Plukenet (1642–1706)
- Plum. – Charles Plumier (1646–1704)
- Plummer – Sara Allen Plummer (1836–1923)
- Plumst. – Edna Pauline Plumstead (1903–1989)
- P.MacGill. – Paul Howard MacGillivray (1834–1895)
- P.Martin – Paul Martin (1923–1982)
- P.M.Gilmour – Phil M. Gilmour (fl. 1987)
- P.Morris – Patrick Francis Morris (1896–1974)
- P.N.Fraser – Patrick Neill Fraser (1830–1905)
- P.N.Johnson – Peter Nevill Johnson (born 1946)
- Pobed. – Evgeniia (Eugenia) Georgievna Pobedimova (1898–1973)
- P.O'Byrne – Peter O'Byrne (1955–2018)
- Pocock – Mary Agard Pocock (1886–1977)
- Pócs – Tamás Pócs (born 1933)
- Podger – Francis Denis Podger (born 1933)
- Podp. – Josef Podpěra (1878–1954)
- Poederlé – Eugene Josef Charles Gilain Hubert d'Olmen Poederlé (1742–1813)
- Poelln. – Karl von Poellnitz (1896–1945)
- Poelt – Josef Poelt (1924–1995)
- Poepp. – Eduard Friedrich Poeppig (1798–1868)
- Poggenb. – Justus Ferdinand Poggenburg I (1840–1893)
- Pohl – Johann Baptist Emanuel Pohl (1782–1834)
- Pohle – Christian Nikolai Richard Pohle (1869–1926)
- Poir. – Jean Louis Marie Poiret (1755–1834)
- Poiss. – Henri Louis Poisson (1877–1963)
- Poit. – Pierre Antoine Poiteau (1766–1854)
- Poivre – Pierre Poivre (1719–1786)
- Pojar – Jim Pojar (fl. 2001)
- Pojark. – Antonina Ivanovna Pojarkova (1897–1980)
- P.O.Karis – Per Ola Karis (born 1955)
- Pokle – Dileep Sadashivrao Pokle (born 1950)
- Pokorny – Alois (or Aloys) Pokorny (1826–1886)
- Polatschek – Adolf Polatschek (1932–2015)
- Pole-Evans – Illtyd (Iltyd) Buller Pole-Evans (1879–1968)
- Polhorský – Adam Polhorský (fl. 2020)
- Poljakov – Petr Petrovich Poljakov (1902–1974)
- Pollard – Charles Louis Pollard (1872–1945)
- Pollexf. – John Hutton Pollexfen (1813–1899)
- Pollich – Johan Adam Pollich (1740–1780)
- Pollock – James Barkley Pollock (1863–1934)
- Polunin – Nicholas Vladimir Polunin (1909–1997)
- Pomel – Auguste Pomel (1821–1898)
- Poole – Alick Lindsay Poole (1908–2008)
- Popl. – Henrietta Ippolitovna Poplavskaja (1885–1956)
- Popov – Mikhail Grigoríevič Popov (1893–1955)
- Poppelw. – Dugald Louis Poppelwell (1863–1939)
- Porcius – Florian Porcius (1816–1907)
- Porteners – M.F. Porteners (fl. 1990)
- Porter – Thomas Conrad Porter (1822–1901)
- Porto – Paulo Campos Porto (1889–1968)
- Poselg. – Heinrich Poselger (1818–1883)
- Posp. – Eduard Pospichal (1838–1905)
- Post – George Edward Post (1838–1909)
- Potter – Michael Cressé Potter (1859–1948)
- Potonié – Henry Potonié (1857–1913)
- Pourr. – Pierre André Pourret (1754–1818)
- Pouzolz – Pierre Marie Casimir de Pouzolz (1785–1858)
- P.Parm. – Paul Évariste Parmentier (1860–1941)
- P.Petit – Paul Charles Mirbel Petit (1834–1913)
- Prada – María del Carmen Isabel Prada (born 1953)
- Pradal – Émile Pradal (1795–1874)
- Pradeep – Ayilliath K. Pradeep (fl. 1990)
- Pradhan – Udai Chandra Pradhan (born 1949)
- Praeger – Robert Lloyd Praeger (1865–1953)
- Praet. – Ignaz Praetorius (1836–1908)
- Prag. – Ernst Prager (1866–1913)
- Prahl – Peter Prahl (1843–1911)
- Prain – David Prain (1857–1944)
- Prak.Rao – Chellapilla Surya Prakasa Rao (born 1917)
- Pramanik – B. B. Pramanik (born 1933)
- P.Ramesh – Polluri Ramesh (fl. 1997)
- Prance – Ghillean Tolmie Prance (born 1937)
- Prantl – Karl Anton Eugen Prantl (1849–1893)
- Prassler – Maria Prassler (born 1938)
- Prát – Silvestr Prát (1895–1990)
- Prather – L. Alan Prather (born 1965)
- Pratt – Anne Pratt (1806–1893)
- Pray – Thomas Richard Pray (born 1923)
- P.R.Bell – Peter Robert Bell (1920–2009)
- Preble – Edward Alexander Preble (1871–1957)
- Preiss – Balthazar Preiss (1765–1850)
- Preobr – Grigory A. Preobraschensky (1892–1919)
- Pridgeon – Alec Melton Pridgeon (born 1949)
- Prill. – Édouard Ernest Prillieux (1829–1915)
- Primavesi – Anthony Leo Primavesi (1917–2011)
- Pringle – Cyrus Pringle (1838–1911)
- Pringsh. – Nathanael Pringsheim (1823–1894)
- Prior — Richard Chandler Alexander Prior (1809–1902)
- Priszter – Szaniszló Priszter (1917–2011)
- Pritz. – George August Pritzel (1815–1874)
- Priyankara – Theja Priyankara (fl. 2020)
- P.R.O.Bally – Peter René Oscar Bally (1895–1980)
- Prober – Suzanne Mary Prober (born 1964)
- Proctor – George Richardson Proctor (1920–2015)
- Prodan – Iuliu Prodan (1875–1959)
- Profice – Sheila Regina Profice (born 1948)
- Prokh. – Jaroslav Ivanovic Prokhanov (1902–1964)
- Prosk. – Johannes Max Proskauer (1923–1970)
- Prowazek – Stanislaus von Prowazek (1875–1915)
- P.Royen – Pieter van Royen (1923–2002)
- P.Rubtzoff – Peter Rubtzoff (1920–1995)
- Pryer – Kathleen M. Pryer (fl. 1993)
- Pryor – Alfred Reginald Pryor (1839–1881)
- P.Sarasin – Paul Benedict Sarasin (1856–1929)
- P.S.Ashton – Peter Shaw Ashton (born 1934)
- P.Schneid. – Peter Schneider (1936–1989)
- P.Selby – Prideaux John Selby (1788–1867)
- P.S.Green – Peter Shaw Green (1920–2009)
- P.Silva – António Rodrigo Pinto da Silva (1912–1992)
- P.S.Liu – Pei Song Liu (fl. 1984)
- P.S.N.Rao – P. Satyanarayana Rao (born 1949)
- P.S.Short – Philip Sydney Short (born 1955)
- P.S.Smith – Philip Sidney Smith (1877–1949)
- P.S.Soltis – Pamela S. Soltis (fl. 2007)
- P.Stark – Peter Stark (1888–1932)
- P.S.Wyse Jacks. – Peter Wyse Jackson (born 1955)
- P.Syd. – Paul Sydow (1851–1925) (father of Hans Sydow)
- P.Taylor – Peter Geoffrey Taylor (1926–2011)
- P.Temple – Paul Temple (fl. 2008)
- P.T.Ong – Poh Teck Ong (fl. 2009)
- P.T.Li – Ping Tao Li (born 1936)
- Puente-Lel. – Caroline Puente-Lelièvre (fl. 2012)
- Puget – François Puget (1829–1880)
- Pugsley – Herbert William Pugsley (1868–1947)
- Pujals – Carmen Pujals (1916–2003)
- Pulle – August Adriaan Pulle (1878–1955)
- Pulliat – Victor Pulliat (1827–1866)
- Pult. – Richard Pulteney (1730–1801)
- Purchas – William Henry Purchas (1823–1903)
- Purdie – William Purdie (c.1817–1857)
- Purdom – William Purdom (1880–1921)
- Purdy – Carlton Elmer Purdy (1861–1945)
- Purk. – Emanuel von Purkyně (1832–1882)
- Purpus – Carl Albert Purpus (1851–1941)
- Pursell – Ronald Arling Pursell (1930–2014)
- Pursh – Frederick Traugott Pursh (1774–1820)
- Purton – Thomas Purton (1768–1833)
- Pushp. – Palpu Pushpangadan (1944–2025)
- Puspit. – Dwi Murti Puspitaningtyas (fl. 2005)
- Putnam – George Palmer Putnam (1887–1950)
- Putt. – Alois (Aloys) Putterlick (1810–1845)
- Puttock – Christopher Francis Puttock (born 1954)
- Putz. – Jules Putzeys (1809–1882)
- P.V.Heath – Paul V. Heath (born 1950)
- P.V.Ramana – Pragada Venkata Ramana (fl. 2018)
- P.Watson – Peter William Watson (1761–1830)
- P.W.Ball – Peter William Ball (born 1932)
- P.Wilkie – Peter Wilkie (fl. 1999)
- P.Wilson – Percy Wilson (1879–1944)
- P.Woods – Patrick James Blythe Woods (1932–2004)
- P.Y.Chen – Pang Yu Chen (born 1936)
- Pynaert – Édouard-Christophe Pynaert (1835–1900)

== Q–Z ==
Contents: Top	A	B	C	D	E F	G	H	I J	K L	M	N O	P	Q R	S	T U V	W X Y Z

To find entries for Q–Z, use the table of contents above.

== See also ==
- List of South African plant botanical authors
- List of botanists
- Category:Botanists
- List of Russian botanists
- List of zoologists by author abbreviation
