= Palmberg =

Palmberg is a Swedish surname, used also in Finland. Notable people with the surname include:

- Jan-Ove Palmberg (born 1943), Swedish engineer
- Johannes Palmberg (c. 1640–1691), Swedish botanist, physician, and priest
- João Pedro Palmberg (born 2003), Brazilian football midfielder
