= Quiina =

- Quiina cruegeriana in Costa Rica

Scientific classification
- Kingdom: Plantae
- Clade: Tracheophytes
- Clade: Angiosperms
- Clade: Eudicots
- Clade: Rosids
- Order: Malpighiales
- Family: Ochnaceae
- Subfamily: Quiinoideae
- Genus: Quiina; Aubl.

Synonyms
- Macrodendron Taub.; Robinsonia Scop.

Genus of plants

Quiina is a genus of flowering plants in the family Ochnaceae. It includes 40 species native to the tropical Americas, ranging from Belize and Honduras to Bolivia and southern Brazil.

The genus was first described by Jean Baptiste Christophore Fusée Aublet in 1775.

== Species ==
The following species are placed in this genus:

- Quiina amazonica A.C.Sm.
- Quiina berryi J.V.Schneid. & Zizka
- Quiina blackii Pires
- Quiina brevensis Pires
- Quiina cidiana J.V.Schneid. & Zizka
- Quiina congesta R.S.Cowan
- Quiina cruegeriana Griseb.
- Quiina duckei Pires
- Quiina florida Tul.
- Quiina gentryi J.V.Schneid. & Zizka
- Quiina glaziovii Engl.
- Quiina grandifolia Mildbr.
- Quiina guianensis Aubl.
- Quiina indigofera Sandwith
- Quiina integrifolia Pulle
- Quiina jamaicensis Griseb.
- Quiina juruana Ule
- Quiina klugii J.F.Macbr.
- Quiina lanceolata Dusén ex Ducke
- Quiina leptoclada Tul.
- Quiina longifolia Spruce ex Planch. & Triana
- Quiina macrophylla Tul.
- Quiina magallano-gomesii Schwacke
- Quiina maguirei Pires
- Quiina maracaensis J.V.Schneid. & Zizka
- Quiina negrensis A.C.Sm.
- Quiina obovata Tul.
- Quiina oiapocensis Pires
- Quiina paraensis Pires& Fróes
- Quiina parvifolia Lanj. & Heerdt
- Quiina piresii J.V.Schneid. & Zizka
- Quiina pteridophylla (Radlk.) Pires
- Quiina pubescens A.C.Sm.
- Quiina rhytidopus Tul.
- Quiina sessilis Choisy, Planch. & Triana
- Quiina tinifolia Planch. & Triana
- Quiina ulei Pulle
- Quiina wurdackii Pires
- Quiina yatuensis J.V.Schneid. & Zizka
- Quiina zamorensis J.V.Schneid. & Zizka
