= Pierrat =

Pierrat is a French surname. Notable people with the surname include:

- Dominique Pierrat (1820–1893), French naturalist
- Jean-Paul Pierrat (born 1952), French cross-country skier, brother of Claude
- Claude Pierrat (born 1963), French cross-country skier
