= Pamplin =

Pamplin may refer to:

- Pamplin City, Virginia

== People with the surname ==
- Robert B. Pamplin
- Robert B. Pamplin, Jr.
- Rocky Pamplin
- William Pamplin (1806–1899), Englisher bookseller and botanist

== See also ==
- Pamplin Media Group
- Pamplin Music
- Pamplin College of Business, Virginia Tech
- Pamplin School of Business, University of Portland
