= Primavesi =

Primavesi is a surname. Notable people with the surname include:

- Anthony Leo Primavesi (1917–2011), English botanist
- Johann Georg Primavesi (1774–1855), German etcher and painter

Notable companies include:

- Primavesi Bros (1850-1956), English jeweller & watchmaker
