= Peckolt =

Peckolt is a surname. Notable people with the surname include:

- Hannes Peckolt (born 1982), German sailor
- Jan-Peter Peckolt (born 1981), German sailor
- Theodor Peckolt (1822–1912), German-born naturalist, botanist, phytochemist, and pharmacist
