= Quiina colonensis =

Conservation status
- Vulnerable (IUCN 2.3)

Scientific classification
- Kingdom: Plantae
- Clade: Tracheophytes
- Clade: Angiosperms
- Clade: Eudicots
- Clade: Rosids
- Order: Malpighiales
- Family: Ochnaceae
- Genus: Quiina
- Species: Q. colonensis

Binomial name
- Quiina colonensis (D'Arcy) D'Arcy

Species of plant

Quiina colonensis is a species of plant in the family Ochnaceae. It is found in Costa Rica and Panama. It is threatened by habitat loss.
