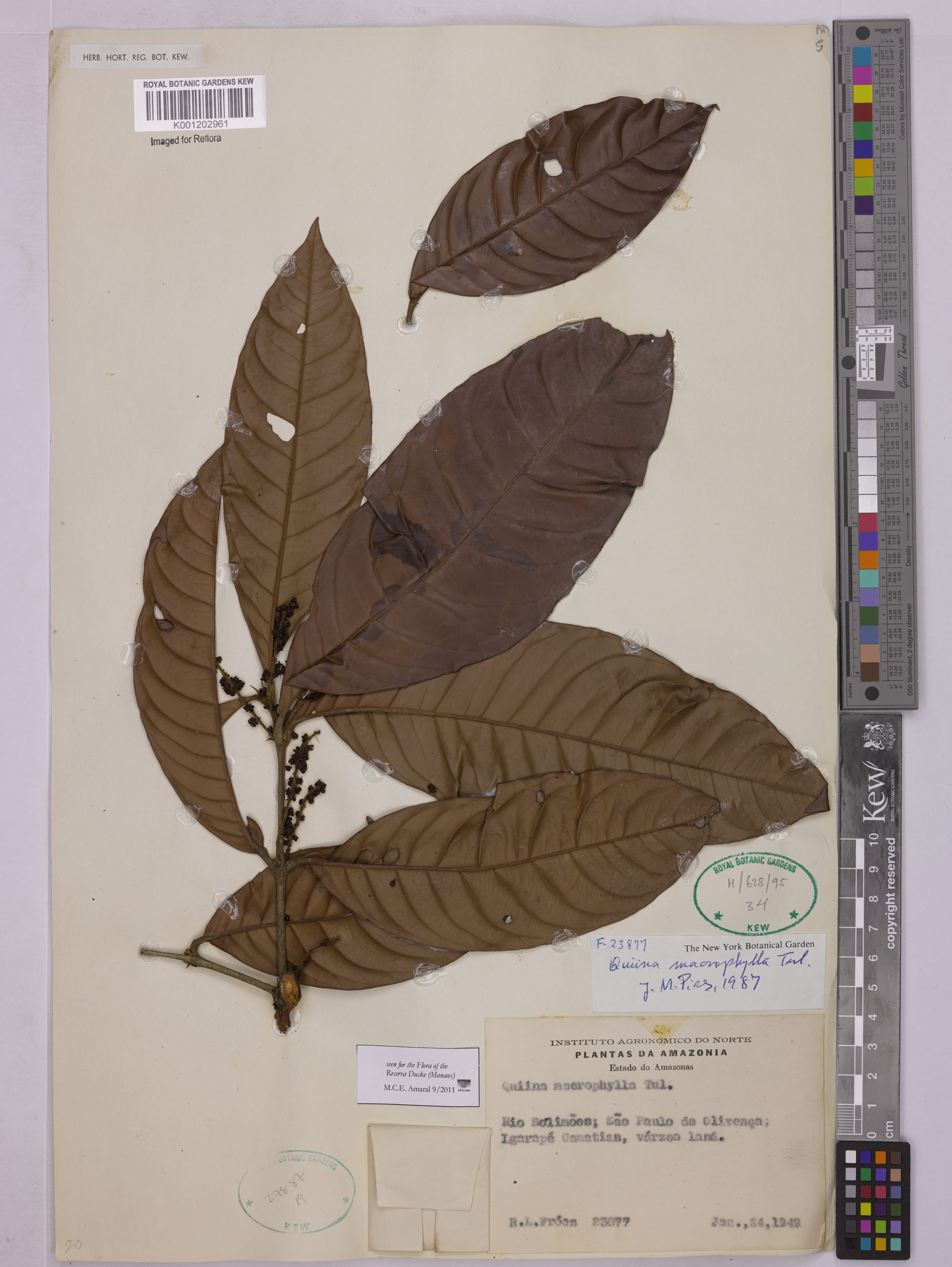

Conservation status
- Least Concern (IUCN 3.1)

Scientific classification
- Kingdom: Plantae
- Clade: Tracheophytes
- Clade: Angiosperms
- Clade: Eudicots
- Clade: Rosids
- Order: Malpighiales
- Family: Ochnaceae
- Genus: Quiina
- Species: Q. macrophylla

Binomial name
- Quiina macrophylla Tul.

Synonyms
- Lacunaria spruceana (Engl.) Pires; Quiina schippii Standl.; Quiina spruceana Engl.

= Quiina macrophylla =

Species of flowering plant

Quiina macrophylla is a species of flowering plant in the family Ochnaceae. It is a shrub or tree native to the tropical Americas, ranging from Belize and Honduras through Central America and northern South America to Bolivia and northern Brazil, where it grows in lowland tropical rain forest. It is used for medicine and for food.

The species was first described by Edmond Tulasne in 1849. The homonym Quiina macrophylla Ule is a synonym of Quiina ulei.
