= William Dickes =

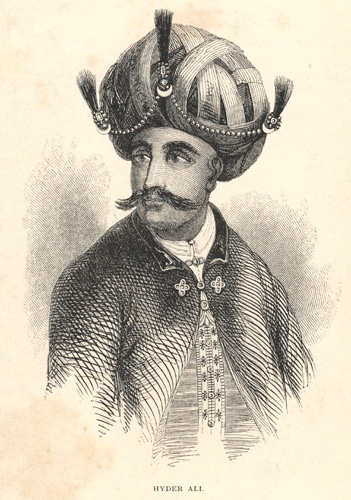
Hyder Ali, ruler of Mysore by William Dickes

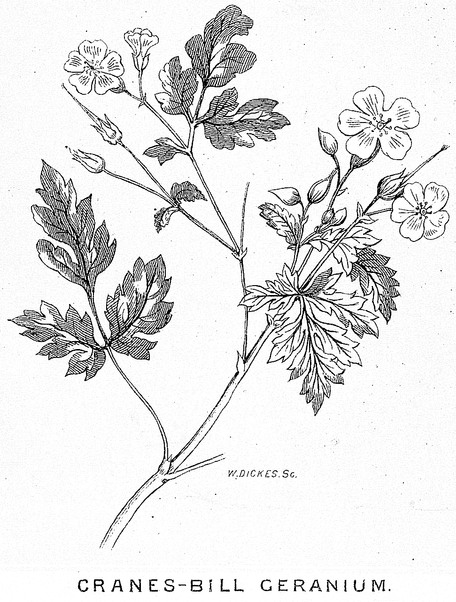
Cranesbill Geranium by William Dickes

William Dickes (1815-1892) was an English illustrator, engraver, printmaker and lithographer.

Dickes worked as apprentice to the wood-engraver Robert Edward Branston, Allen Robert Branston's son, in about 1831. He studied at the Royal Academy Schools in 1835 and displayed examples of oil-colour printing at the Great Exhibition. He founded William Dickes & Company in London about 1864, his workshop and office being at 48 Salisbury Square, Fleet Street, London (1846–48); 4 Crescent Place, Bridge Street, Blackfriars, London (1849–51); 5 Old Fish Street, Doctor's Common, London (c.1852); 109 Farringdon Road, London (c.1867-1875). Dickes retired in 1873.

William Dickes was one of a group of London-based wood-engravers who saw in the developing market for illustration a great opportunity to profitably use their technical and artistic skills - the burgeoning book and periodical trade in London created an insatiable demand for images. Dickes assembled a team of wood-engravers between 1842 and 1847 to illustrate the Abbotsford edition of Walter Scott's work.

Dickes specialised in illustrating books on natural history—such as works by Anne Pratt— and was a licensee of the Baxter Process of printing. His biographer, Alfred Docker, bequeathed 1370 works by Dickes to the British Museum in 1931 and these are kept at Blythe House.

Dickes collected many awards for the quality of his lithography. Although starting with wood-engraving, he moved to and developed new processes in colour lithography using copper plates. His work was exhibited at International Exhibitions in London, Dublin and Paris in the 1860s.

Chromolithography reached its pinnacle toward the end of the 1800s. Colour images were printed using multiple stones, each printing a different colour in a process calling for precise alignment.

== Illustrations ==
- Glaucus or The Wonders of the Shore - Charles Kingsley, MacMillan & Co., 1859
- Actinologia Britannica - A History of the British Sea-Anemones and Corals - Philip Henry Gosse, Van Voorst, 1860
- Studies from the Great Masters - Rev. Bennet George Johns, Hamilton, Adams and Co., London, 1862
- A Year With the Wild Flowers - Edith Waddy, Wesleyan Conference Office of London, 1877
- The Flowering Plants, Grasses, Sedges, & Ferns of Great Britain and their allies, the club mosses, horsetails, etc. - Anne Pratt (1806–1893), Edward Step (1855–1931), F. Warne, 1905

== Bibliography ==
- The Colour Prints of William Dickes - Alfred Docker, London, Courier Press, 1924
