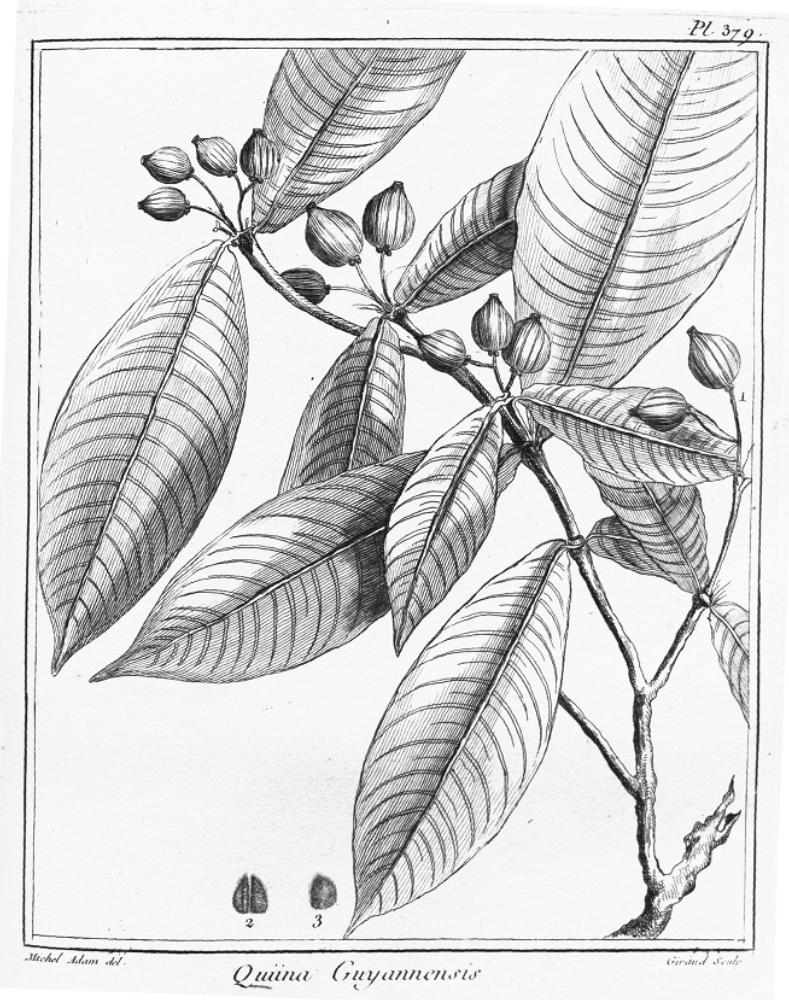

Scientific classification
- Kingdom: Plantae
- Clade: Tracheophytes
- Clade: Angiosperms
- Clade: Eudicots
- Clade: Rosids
- Order: Malpighiales
- Family: Ochnaceae
- Genus: Quiina
- Species: Q. guianensis

Binomial name
- Quiina guianensis Aubl.

= Quiina guianensis =

Species of flowering plant

Quiina guianensis is a species of flowering plant, in the genus Quiina, native to French Guiana, Guyana, Suriname, Trinidad-Tobago, Venezuela, that primarily grows in wet tropical climates. It has also been found in Malaysia, Indonesia, Madagascar, Brunei and Panama.
