= John Owen Jones =

John Owen Jones may refer to:

- John Owen-Jones (born 1971), Welsh actor and singer
- John Owen Jones (Ap Ffarmwr) (1861–1899), Welsh journalist
- John Owen Jones (footballer) (1871–1955), Welsh footballer

== See also ==
- Jon Owen Jones (born 1954), Welsh politician
- John Jones (disambiguation)
