= Quiina florida =

Scientific classification
- Kingdom: Plantae
- Clade: Tracheophytes
- Clade: Angiosperms
- Clade: Eudicots
- Clade: Rosids
- Order: Malpighiales
- Family: Ochnaceae
- Genus: Quiina
- Species: Q. florida

Binomial name
- Quiina florida Tul.

Species of plant

Quiina florida is a species of tree native to South America. It can be found in countries like Bolivia, Brazil, Colombia, Ecuador, Peru, and Venezuela.
