= Jim Pojar =

James "Jim" Joseph Pojar (born January 12, 1948, in Ramsey, Minnesota) Is an American-Canadian field botanist, forester, and ecologist. In 2015 the Canadian Botanical Association awarded him the George Lawson Medal for lifetime achievement.

== Biography ==
After graduating with a master's degree in botany from the University of Minnesota, Pojar studied from 1970 to 1974 at the University of British Columbia. His 1974 Ph.D. thesis Relation of the reproductive biology of plants to the structure and function of four plant communities was supervised by Katherine "Kay" I. Beamish. Pojar became involved with Vladimir Krajina's Ecological Reserves (ERs) Program at its inception in 1972. Krajina hired, as field summer assistants, Pojar, along with some of Pojar's fellow graduate students, such as Karel Klinka. Krajina collaborated with some fellow academics, such as Geoffrey G. E. Scudder, Thomas H. Carefoot (b. 1938), and Robert Charles Brooke (1934-2014), to do field surveys. After his graduation in 1974, Pojar worked as a biological consultant for about a year and a half and then became employed by Krajina's ERs for three years and a few months. The goals of the ERs Program were to set aside and protect government-owned areas in British Columbia. The two primary goals for protection were to promote scientific research and to have natural benchmarks for evaluating land management and human use in other areas. Krajina's ERs Program successfully set aside several environmental reserves, of which the Gladys Lake Ecological Reserve is especially noteworthy. Near the beginning of the decades of the 1980s, Pojar resigned from the ERs Project and joined the Canadian Forest Service. During his employment for the Research Section of British Columbia's Ministry of Forests, he became a "highly respected field botanist/ecologist". He worked for more than 40 years for the forest service based in Smithers, British Columbia.

Pojar is the author or co-author of many scientific articles and reports, as well as several books, including field guides for plants to be identified by amateur botanists. His wife Rosamund is among the contributors to some of his books. Jim Pojar's book Plants of Coastal British Columbia, including Washington, Oregon & Alaska, co-authored by Andy McKinnon and Paul B. Alaback, sold 250,000 copies as of the year 2013.

According to Jim Pojar, commercial logging of primary old-growth forests and replacing them with managed tree plantations can cause a 40 to 50 percent reduction in carbon sequestration. He advocates preserving and protecting British Columbia's natural forests with as much old-growth as possible, especially in British Columbia's wetter regions. He says that lack of protection of the forests increases the damage caused by "wildfires, insect outbreaks, and blowdowns.

== Selected publications ==
=== Articles ===
- Pojar, Jim (1973). "Levels of polyploidy in four vegetation types of southwestern British Columbia". Canadian Journal of Botany. 51 (3): 621–628. doi:10.1139/b73-075.
- Pojar, Jim (1973). "Pollination of Typically Anemophilous Salt Marsh Plants by Bumble Bees, Bombus terricola occidentalis Grne". The American Midland Naturalist. 89 (2): 448–451. doi:10.2307/2424049. JSTOR 2424049.
- Pojar, Jim (1974). "Reproductive dynamics of four plant communities of southwestern British Columbia". Canadian Journal of Botany. 52 (8): 1819–1834. doi:10.1139/b74-234.
- Banner, A.; Pojar, J.; Rouse, G. E. (1983). "Postglacial paleoecology and successional relationships of a bog woodland near Prince Rupert, British Columbia". Canadian Journal of Forest Research. 13 (5): 938–947. doi:10.1139/x83-125.
- Sullivan, Thomas P.; Jackson, William T.; Pojar, James; Banner, Allen (1986). "Impact of feeding damage by the porcupine on western hemlock – Sitka spruce forests of north-coastal British Columbia". Canadian Journal of Forest Research. 16 (3): 642–647. doi:10.1139/x86-110.
- Banner, A.; Pojar, J.; Trowbridge, R.; Hamilton, A. (1986). "Grizzly bear habitat in the Kimsquit River Valley, coastal British Columbia: classification, description, and mapping". Proceedings—Grizzly Bear Habitat Symposium: Missoula, Montana, April 30—May 2, 1985. Ogden, Utah: Intermountain Research Center. pp. 36–49.
- Pojar, J.; Klinka, K.; Meidinger, D.V. (1987). "Biogeoclimatic ecosystem classification in British Columbia". Forest Ecology and Management. 22 (1–2): 119–154. doi:10.1016/0378-1127(87)90100-9.
- Pojar, Jim; Klinka, K.; Dermarchi, D. A. (1991). "Coastal western hemlock zone". Ecosystems of British Columbia. Victoria, BC: Ministry of Forests. pp. 95–111.
- Pojar, Jim (1996). "Environment and biogeography of the western boreal forest". The Forestry Chronicle. 72: 51–58. doi:10.5558/tfc72051-1.
- Klinka, Karel; Qian, Hong; Pojar, Jim; Meidinger, V. (1996). "Classification of natural forest communities of coastal British Columbia, Canada". Vegetatio. 125 (2): 149–168. doi:10.1007/BF00044648. S2CID 39025892.
- Asada, Taro; Warner, Barry G.; Pojar, Jim (2003). "Environmental factors responsible for shaping an open peatland forest complex on the hypermaritime north coast of British Columbia". Canadian Journal of Forest Research. 33 (12): 2380–2394. doi:10.1139/x03-174.
- Geertsema, Marten; Pojar, James J. (2007). "Influence of landslides on biophysical diversity — A perspective from British Columbia". Geomorphology. 89 (1–2): 55–69. Bibcode:2007Geomo..89...55G. doi:10.1016/j.geomorph.2006.07.019.

=== Books ===
- Some common plants of the sub-boreal spruce zone (PDF). Land Management Handbook, Number 6. Victoria, BC: Research Branch, Ministry of Forests. March 1982. ISBN 0-7719-8904-0; by J. Pojar, R. Love, D. Meininger, and R. Scagel; abstract, gov.bc.ca, The official website of the Government of British Columbia
- Ecosystem classification and interpretation of the sub-boreal spruce zone, Prince Rupert Forest Region, British Columbia. Victoria, BC: Research Station, Ministry of Forests. 1984. LCCN 84219181; by J. Pojar, R. Trowbridge, and D. Coates
- Ecosystems of British Columbia. Special Report Series, ISSN 0843-6452; no, 6. Victoria, B.C.: Research Branch, Ministry of Forests. 1991. ISBN 0-7718-8997-6. LCCN 92141286; compiled and edited by Del Meidinger and Jim Pojar
- Plants of coastal British Columbia, including Washington, Oregon & Alaska. Lone Pine Publishing. 1994. ISBN 1551050420; compiled and edited by Jim Pojar, Andy MacKinnon, and Paul B. Alaback
  - Plants of the Pacific Northwest Coast: Washington, Oregon, British Columbia & Alaska (revised ed.). Vancouver: Lone Pine Publishing. 2004. ISBN 1551055309; compiled and edited by Andy McKinnon, Jim Pojar, and Paul B. Alaback
- Alpine plants of the Northwest: Wyoming to Alaska. Edmonton, Alberta, Canada: Lone Pine Publishing. 2013. ISBN 978-1551058924; Jim Pojar & Andy MacKinnon with Rosamund Pojar, Curtis Björk and Hans Roemer

The standard author abbreviation Pojar is used to indicate this person as the author when citing a botanical name.
