= Jan-Ove Palmberg =

Jan-Ove Palmberg, born 1943, is a Professor of Mechanical Engineering at Linköping University. He received his M.S. and Ph.D. degrees from Chalmers University of Technology in 1969 and 1975 respectively. He was appointed a Professor at the Department of Mechanical Engineering at Linköping University in 1975. In 1983–1990 he was the Dean of the Institute of Technology, in 2003-2006 he was the Head of the Department of Mechanical Engineering, and in 2007 he was the Head of the Department of Management and Engineering.

== Awards ==
- Robert E. Koski Medal, American Society of Mechanical Engineers, 2009.
- Joseph Bramah Medal, Institution of Mechanical Engineers, 1997.
- Member of the Royal Swedish Academy of Engineering Sciences, 1991.
