= Pierre Bernard Palassou =

French scientist (1745–1830)

Pierre Bernard Palassou (9 June 1745, Oloron-Sainte-Marie – 9 April 1830, Ogenne-Camptort) was a French naturalist known for pioneer geological and mineralogical studies of the Pyrénées.

He was a correspondent member of the Académie des sciences (1816–1830) and an honorary member of the Société linnéenne de Paris (1821). His name is associated with the "Poudingues de Palassou", which are enormous beds of conglomerate rock found in the Pyrénées. In 1784 he described Quercus palensis (Pyrenean oak) of the botanical family Fagaceae, (synonym Quercus pyrenaica Willd.).

== Selected works ==
- Essai sur la minéralogie des Monts-Pyrénées, 1784.
- Mémoires pour servir a l'histoire naturelle des Pyrénées et des pays adjacents, 1815.
- Suite des mémoires pour servir a l'histoire naturelle des Pyrénées, et des pays adjacens, 1819.
- Supplément aux mémoires pour servir a l'histoire naturelle des Pyrénées, et des pays adjacens, 1821.
