= Nina Pavlova =

Russian botanist

Dr. Nina Mikhailovna Pavlova (1897–1973) was a Russian botanist, plant breeder, and children's literature author. As a botanist she is noted for developing cultivars of berry plants, including 24 new varieties of currant and gooseberry. As a children's literature author, she popularized scientific topics for children as fairy tales. She was a recipient of the Order of Lenin and the Order of the Badge of Honour. The standard author abbreviation Pavlova is used to indicate this person as the author when citing a botanical name.
