= Platon Panyutin =

Platon Sergeevich Panjutin (Russian: Платон Сергеевич Панютин, 1889 – 1946) was a Russian chemist, botanist, naturalist, and mountain climber. He collected botanical specimens in the southern part of the Caucasus Mountains in Abkhazia.

Panjutin was a chemist by education, but his love of nature made botany his second specialty; he became a great researcher and herbarium collector of the flora of Abkhazia (Feodorov 1948).

In 1913 the botanist G. Sakharov collected a snowdrop (genus Galanthus) near Gagra at 1,600 meters. After studying the botanical specimen, Panjutin named its species Galanthus valentinae. However, Panjutin did not validly publish the name according to the rules of the International Code of Botanical Nomenclature. For about a century, botanists regarded G. valentinae as a synonym for G. krasnovii. In 2008 Dmitri Zubov and Olga Bondareva collected in western Transcaucasia a snowdrop specimen. According to Zubov and Aaron P. Davis (from Kew) the 2008 specimen belonged to the same species as Sakharov's 1913 specimen and, furthermore, the two specimens belonged to a species different from the 19 known species in the genus Galanthus. Zubov and Davis named the new species Galanthus panjutinii in honor of Panjutin.

== Eponyms ==
- Galanthus panjutinii

== Selected publications ==
- Panjutin, P.; Rapoport, M. (1930). "Zur Frage der Gewinnung des reinen Glyzerids der Rizinolsäure". Chemische Umschau auf dem Gebiet der Fette, Oele, Wachse und Harze. 37 (9): 130–135. doi:10.1002/lipi.19300370903.
- Marder, M.; Katz, E.; Davis, D. S.; Panjutin, P. S.; Tischkowa, W. N.; Koetschau, R.; Fogelsson, J. I.; Chierer, F.; Ssemenido, J. G.; Krol, B. B.; Nikolskaja, W. P.; Richter, M.; Balada, A.; Tschertawskich, A. K.; Levin, H.; Baader, A.; Steinbrecher, H.; Kühne, H. (1938). "Mineralölprodukte". Zeitschrift für Analytische Chemie. 115 (5–6): 232–239. doi:10.1007/BF01675771.
- Panjutin, P. S. "Tall herbaceous vegetation of the West Caucasus." Izvestia Russk Geogr Obschestva 71, no. 9 (1939): 27–45.
- Panjutin, P. S. "Mires of Colchide." Botanicheskii Zhurnal of USSR 27, no. 5 (1942): 94–107.
