= Narel Y. Paniagua-Zambrana =

Bolivian ethnobotanist

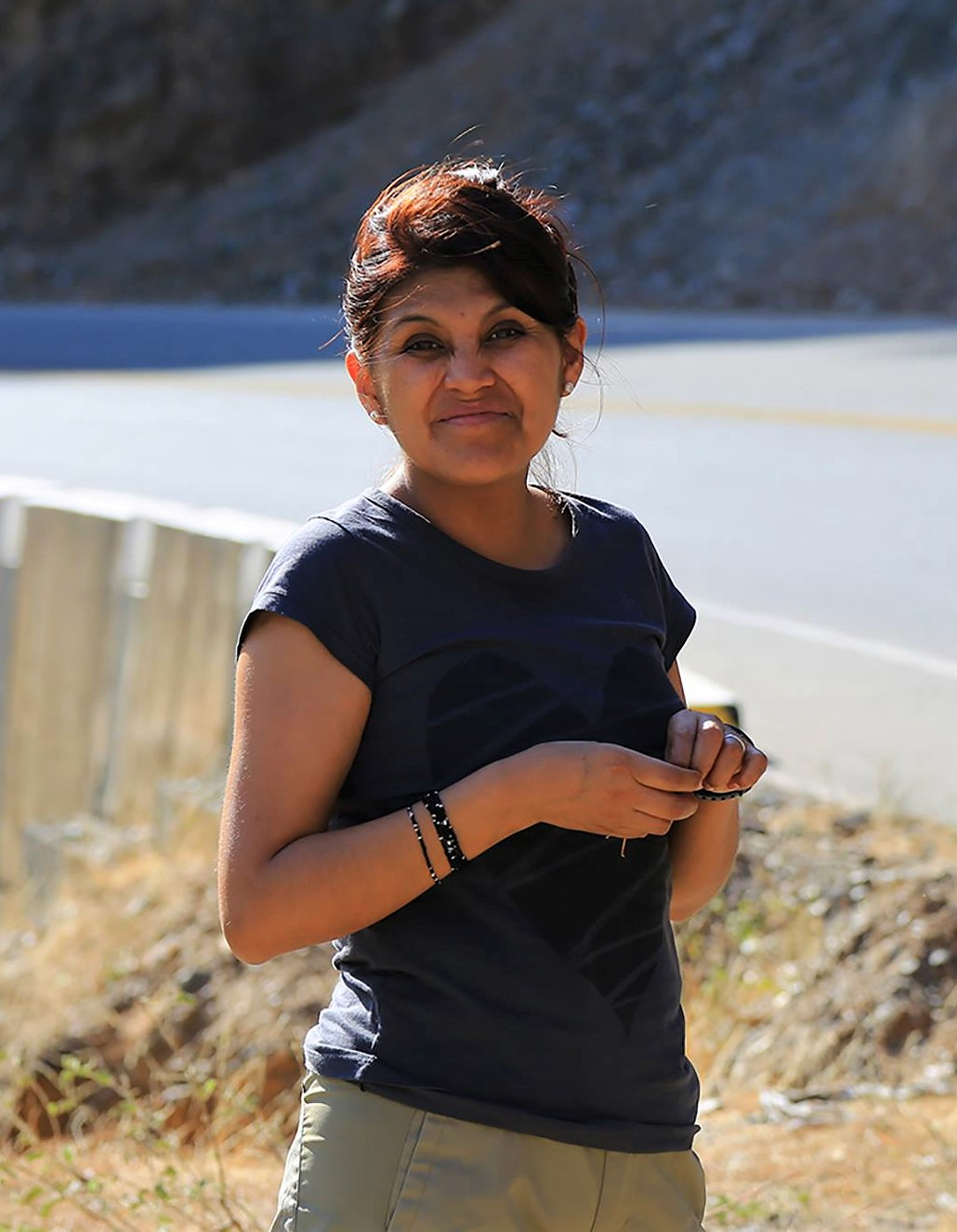
- Born: 1973 (age 52–53); La Paz, Bolivia
- Education: Universidad Mayor de San Andrés
- Occupation: Biologist
- Awards: Organización para las Mujeres en la Ciencia para el Mundo en Desarrollo
- Scientific career
- Fields: Ethnobotany

Narel Y. Paniagua-Zambrana (born 13 May 1973) is a Bolivian ethnobotanist. She investigates the use and protection of traditional knowledge of plants in indigenous communities, particularly in the Bolivian Andes. She is currently an Associated Researcher at the Herbario Nacional de Bolivia, Instituto de Ecología, Universidad Mayor de San Andres in Bolivia. Her goal is giving them the knowledge to participate in decision-making on the conservation of their intangible cultural heritage.

== Biography ==
Paniagua-Zambrana was born in La Paz, Bolivia on 13. May, 1973. Her love for nature stems from her childhood, when she played in the mountains while her father worked as a geologist in the Bolivian tin mines. Later, she decided to make a life career out of this passion, studying biology and later specializing in ethnobotany, a science that studies the use of plants by humans. In 1998, she earned her Bachelor of Science in Biology from the Universidad Mayor de San Andrés in La Paz, studying under noted ecologist Robin B. Foster. In 2005 she obtained her Master of Science from the Aarhus University. She married ethnobotanist and sometime co-author Dr. Rainer Bussmann. Her botanical research has focused on flora and vegetation in indigenous communities, particularly the native palms of the Andes and Amazonia.

In 2016, under guidance of Mónica Moraes Ramírez, she obtained her PhD in biology from the Autonomous University of Madrid with her thesis "Diversity, usage patterns and socioeconomic value of palms species used in tropical forest" ("Diversidad, patrones de uso y valoración socio-económica de las de las palmeras en los bosques neotropicales").

She currently works as an associate researcher at the Bolivian National Herbarium in the Ecology Institute of the University of San Andrés (Herbario Nacional de Bolivia - Instituto de Ecología de la Universidad Mayor de San Andrés).

In an interview in April 2020, Paniagua-Zambrana expressed concerns about entering the indigenous territories where she normally conducts her research for fears of bringing COVID-19 to local communities, and temporarily suspended her fieldwork.

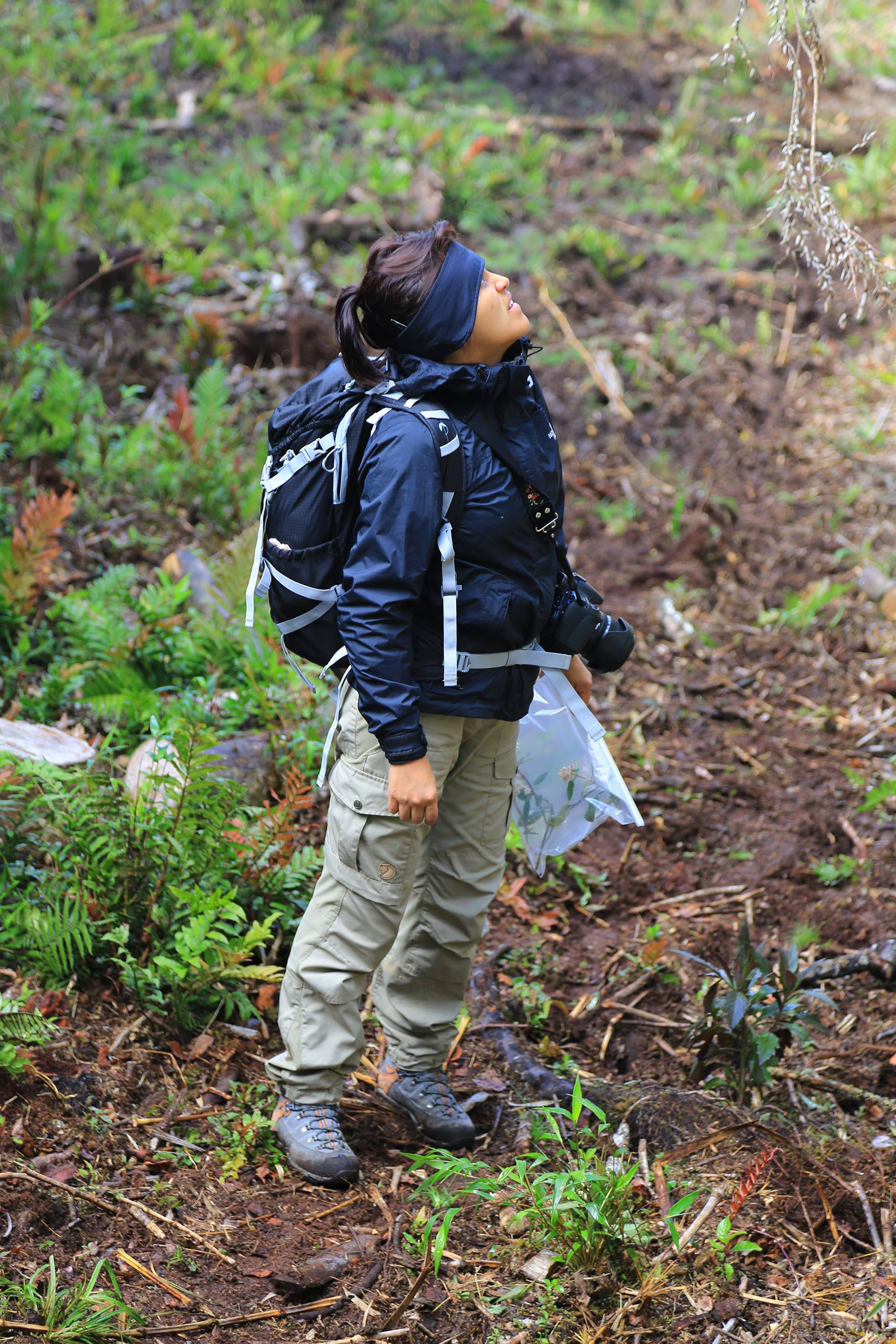
Narel Y. Paniagua-Zambrana during one of her expeditions.

== Scientific career and contributions ==
According to a regional study by Elsevier and Google Scholar, Paniagua-Zambrana is among the most-published researchers in Bolivia. She has written more than 200 scientific papers, 30 books and more than 400 book chapters. Her work involves indigenous communities in Bolivia, Peru, Ecuador, Colombia and Madagascar. She is a professor at Ilia State University in Tbilisi, Georgia and a visiting professor of biology at the National University of San Marcos (Universidad De San Marcos) in Lima, Perú. She is also a member of the Society for Economic Botany (SEB), the Asociación Latinoamericana de Botánica (ALB), the Grupo Latinoamericano de Etnobotánica - Grupo de Bolivia (GELA), the Organización Boliviana para Mujeres en la Ciencia and the Organization for Women in Science for the Developing World.

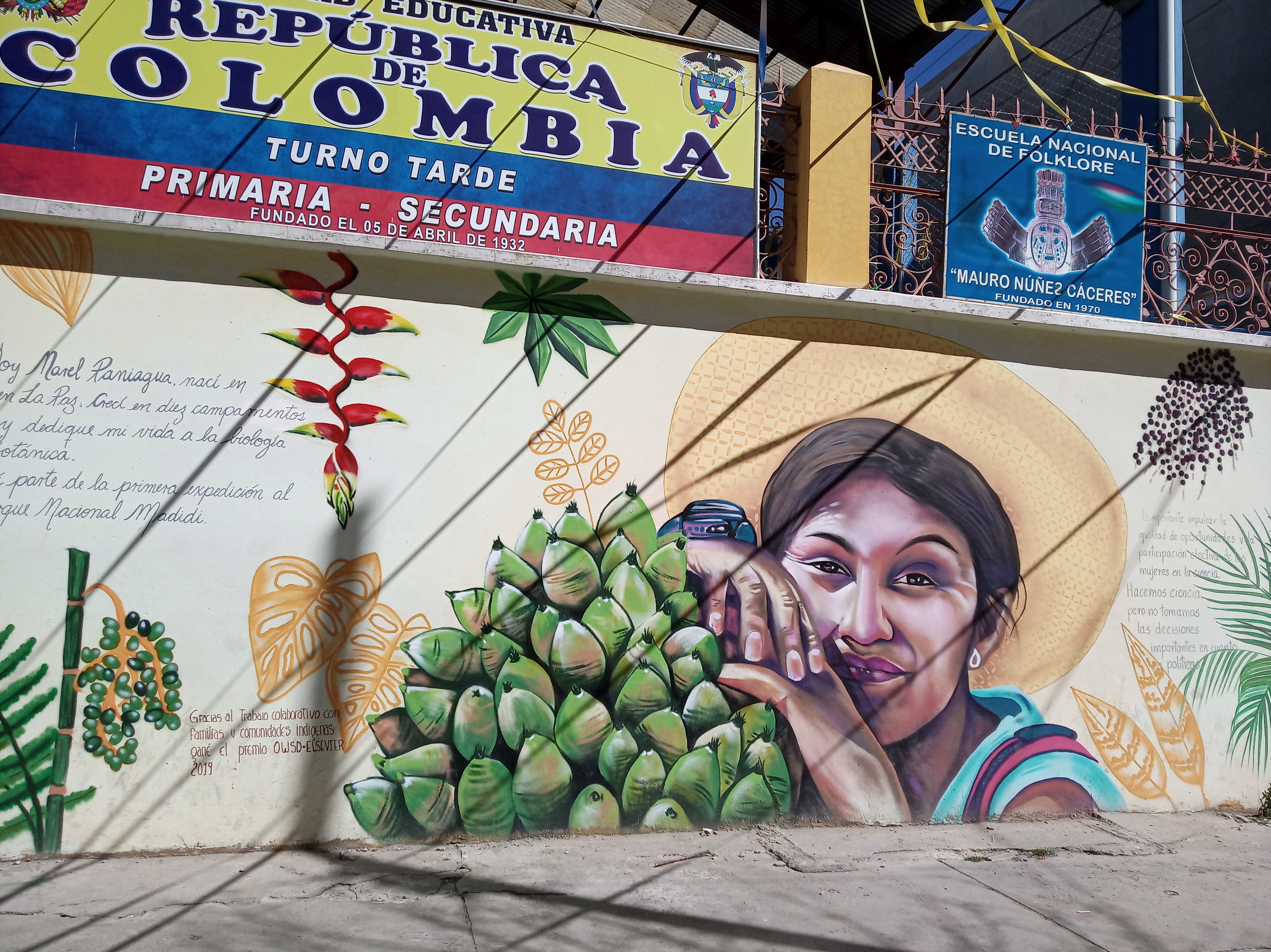
Mural dedicated to Paniagua-Zambrana in La Paz.

== Recognition ==
In 2001 Paniagua-Zambrana received the Camara Junior award for Environmental Leadership of the Chamber for Commercein Bolivia

The Organization for Women in Science for the Developing World-Elsevier Foundation awarded her the Latin America & the Caribbean region early-career award. This award annually recognizes five women from developing countries in the field of Biology, and acknowledges their commitment in guiding young scientists and improving life in their communities and regions. Paniagua-Zambrana is the first Bolivian women scientist recognized with this award.

Also in 2019, to mark International Women's Day, the World Food Programme commissioned a mural by Norka Paz in honor of her work, in the Sopocachi neighborhood of La Paz.

== Books and publications ==
- Myers, Jonathan A.; Chase, Jonathan M.; Jiménez, Iván; Jørgensen, Peter M.; Araujo-Murakami, Alejandro; Paniagua-Zambrana, Narel; Seidel, Renate (2013). "Beta-diversity in temperate and tropical forests reflects dissimilar mechanisms of community assembly". Ecology Letters. 16 (2): 151–157. doi:10.1111/ele.12021. PMID 23113954.
- Bussmann, Rainer W.; Paniagua Zambrana, Narel Y.; Sikharulidze, Shalva; Kikvidze, Zaal; Kikodze, David; Tchelidze, David; Khutsishvili, Manana; Batsatsashvili, Ketevan; Hart, Robbie E.; Pieroni, Andrea (2016). "Your Poison in My Pie—the Use of Potato (Solanum tuberosum L.) Leaves in Sakartvelo, Republic of Georgia, Caucasus, and Gollobordo, Eastern Albania". Economic Botany. 70 (4): 431–437. doi:10.1007/s12231-016-9366-7. S2CID 1984809.
- Bussmann, R.W.; Paniagua Zambrana, N.Y.; Sikharulidze, S.; Kikvidze, Z.; Kikodze, D.; Jinjikhadze, T.; Shanshiashvili, T.; Chelidze, D.; Batsatsashvili, K.; Bakanidze, N. (2014). "Wine, beer, snuff, medicine, and loss of diversity-ethnobotanical travels in the Georgian Caucasus" (PDF). Ethnobotany Research and Applications. 12: 237–313. doi:10.17348/era.12.0.237-313.
- Macía MJ, Armesilla PJ, Cámara-Leret R, Paniagua-Zambrana N, Villalba S, Balslev H, Pardo-de-Santayana M. Palm uses in northwestern South America: a quantitative review. Botanical Review. 2011 Dec 1;77(4):462-570.
- Bussmann RW, Paniagua-Zambrana NY, Sikharulidze S, Kikvidze Z, Kikodze D, Tchelidze D, Batsatsashvili K, Hart RE. Plant and fungal use in Tusheti, Khevsureti, and Pshavi, Sakartvelo (republic of Georgia), Caucasus. Acta Societatis Botanicorum Poloniae. 2017;86(2).

The standard author abbreviation Paniagua is used to indicate this person as the author when citing a botanical name.
