= Anne Pratt =

English painter

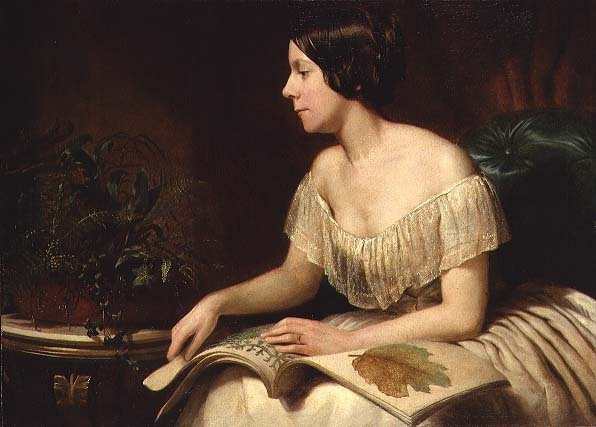
- Born: 5 December 1806; Strood, Kent
- Died: 27 July 1893 (aged 86); Hammersmith/Fulham, London
- Known for: Botanical Illustration
- Spouse: John Pearless [married 1866]

Anne Pratt (5 December 1806 – 27 July 1893) was a botanical and ornithological illustrator and author from Strood, Kent.

== Life ==
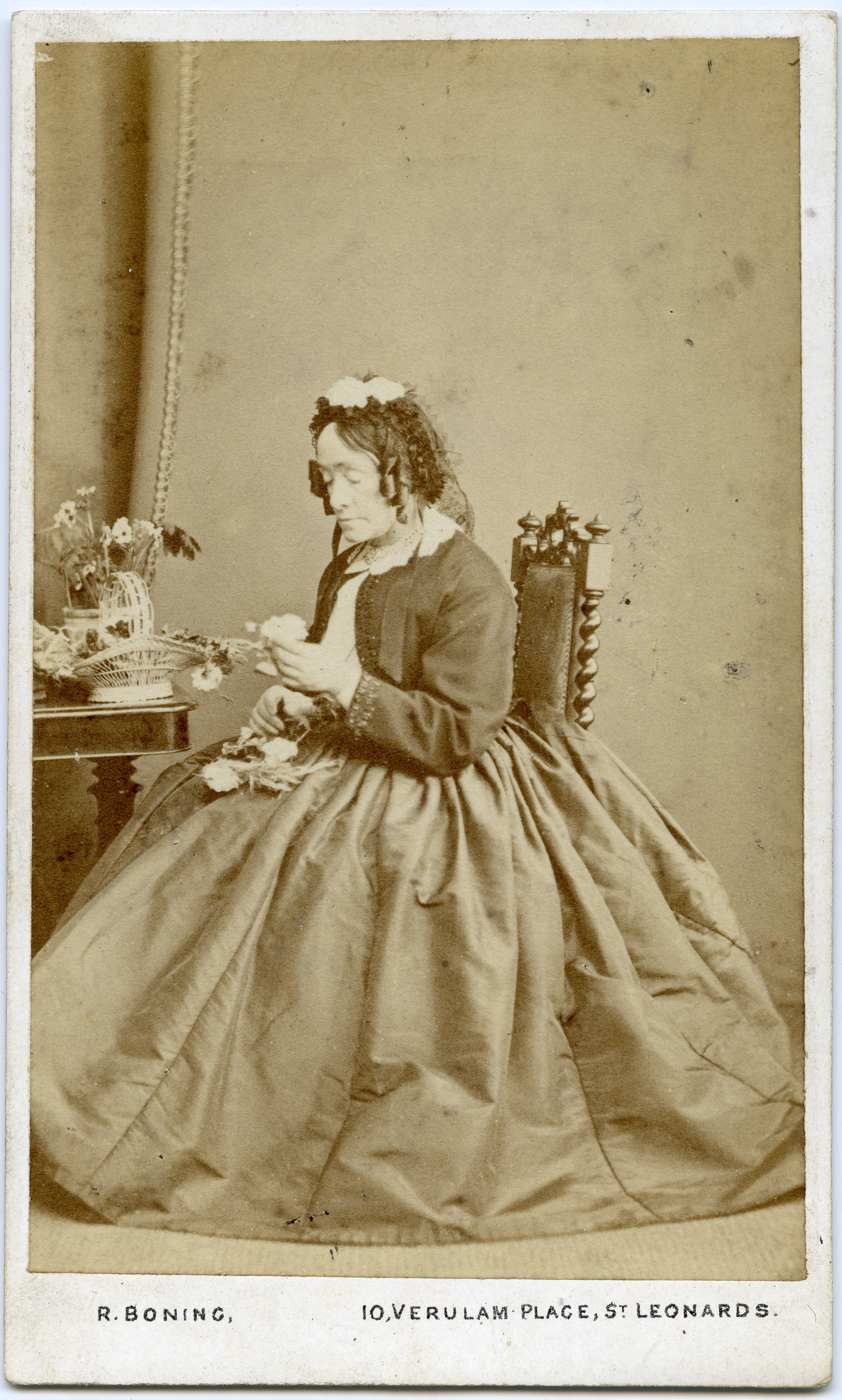
Carte de visite

Anne (also known as Annie) was the second of three daughters of Robert Pratt (1777–1819), a grocer, and Sara Bundock (1780–1845). Anne Pratt was one of the best known English botanical illustrators of the Victorian age. As a consequence of her poor health (due to rheuimatic fever) and an impaired knee, during her childhood, she was excluded from sports, and was encouraged to occupy herself by drawing. Pratt was educated at Eastgate House, Rochester, and introduced to botany - considered a suitable field for women - by Dr. Dods, a family friend. She moved to Brixton, London, in 1826, where she developed her career as an illustrator. Pratt settled in Dover in 1849, and in East Grinstead in 1866. On 15 November 1866, at age 60, at Christchurch, Luton, Kent, she married John Pearless, with whom she subsequently settled at Redhill. Pratt died in Shepherd's Bush, London.

== Works ==
Pratt first rose to prominence with Wild Flowers of the Year, published in 1852–1853, which was dedicated to Queen Victoria with the monarch's permission. Pratt composed more than 20 books, which she illustrated with chromolithographs, on which she collaborated with William Dickes, an engraver skilled in the chromolithograph process. Her works were written in an accessible but accurate style that was partly responsible for the popularising of botany in her day. From her first book, Flowers and Their Associations, her works sold well, but she did not ever achieve critical acclaim as a consequence of a bourgeois disdain for the autodidactic woman.

Pratt's magnum opus is The Flowering Plants, Grasses, Sedges, and Ferns of Great Britain and Their Allies the Club Mosses, Pepperworts, and Horsetails, a six-volume project assessing more than 1500 species, with 300 illustrations, that was published over a decade, between 1855 and 1873. The illustrations used a form of chromolithography, the Baxter method, a commercial technique used create affordable coloured images to allow her work a broader readership. This work was long used as a standard reference work: the illustrations of ferns in the final volume continued to be used into the second half of the twentieth century; they appeared, unattributed and in very much reduced size, and in half tone, in the Observer's Book of [British] Ferns.

A number of her works are now available in the Biodiversity Heritage Library.

== Selected works ==
- The Field, the Garden, and the Woodland, 1838.
- Flowers and their associations, 1840.
- The Pictorial Catechism of Botany. London: Suttaby and Co., 1842.
- The Ferns of Great Britain, c. 1850.
- Wild Flowers, 1852 (2 vols.). Also published as classroom wall hangings.
- Poisonous, Noxious, and Suspected Plants, of our Fields and Woods, 1857.
- The Flowering Plants, Grasses, Sedges, and Ferns of Great Britain and Their Allies the Club Mosses, Pepperworts, and Horsetails. London: Frederick Warne and Co., 1855–1873, 6 vols. (Originally only 5 volumes, published 1855–1866, as The Flowering Plants of Great Britain; the 6th volume, on grasses, sedges, and ferns, was added in 1873).
- Chapters on Common Things of the Sea-side. Society for the Promotion of Christian Knowledge, 1850.
- Our Native Songsters. Society for the Promotion of Christian Knowledge, 1853.
- Haunts of the Wild Flowers. Routledge, Warne and Routledge, 1863.
- The British Grasses and Sedges. Society for the Promotion of Christian Knowledge, 1859.
- The Garden Flowers of the Year. Religious Tract Society, 1846.
- Wild Flowers of The Year. Religious Tract Society, 1846.
- The Excellent Woman as Described in Proverbs 31. Religious Tract Society, 1863.
Illustrations by Anne Pratt
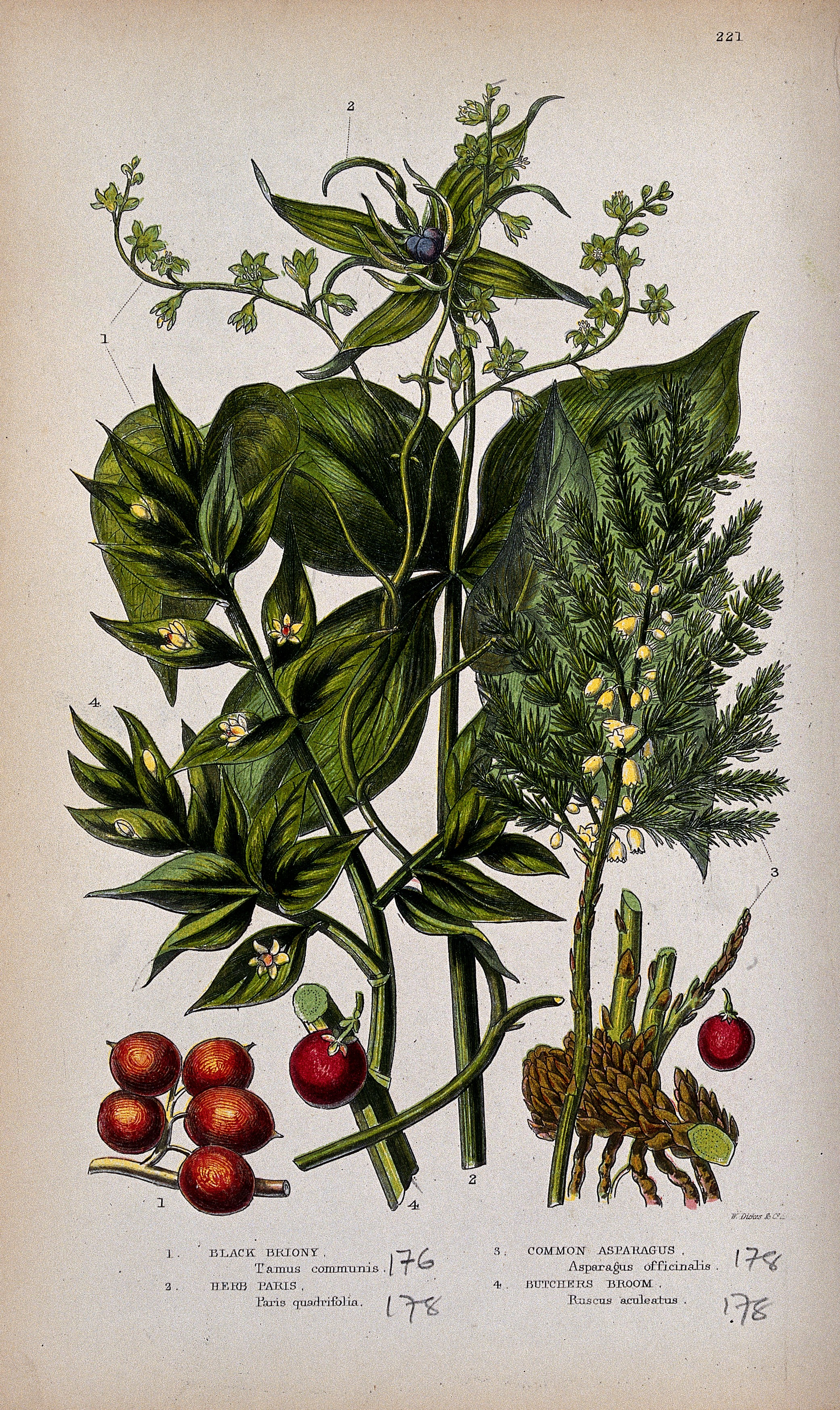
Four flowering and fruiting plants, illustration by Anne Pratt.

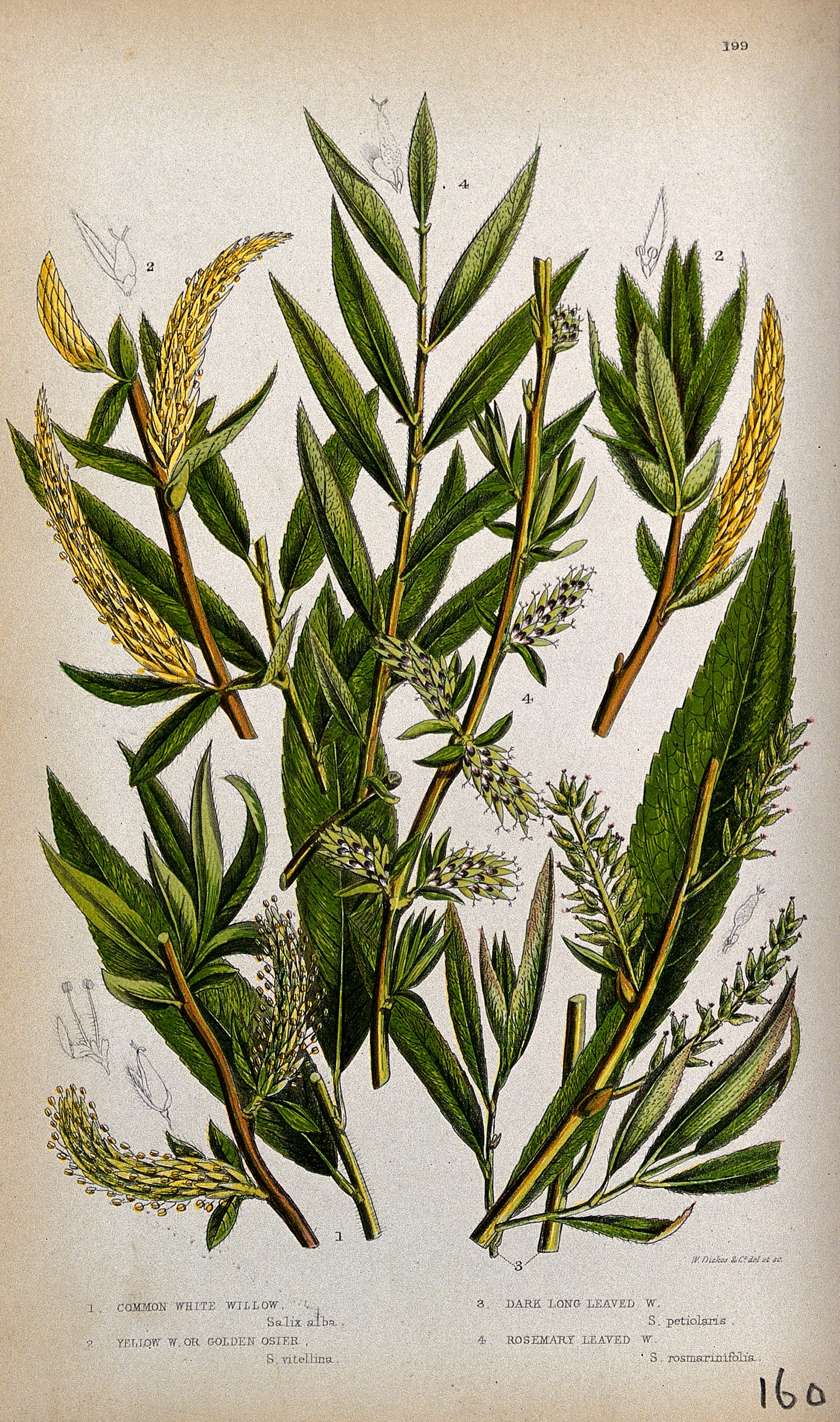
Four willow stems with catkins, illustration by Anne Pratt.

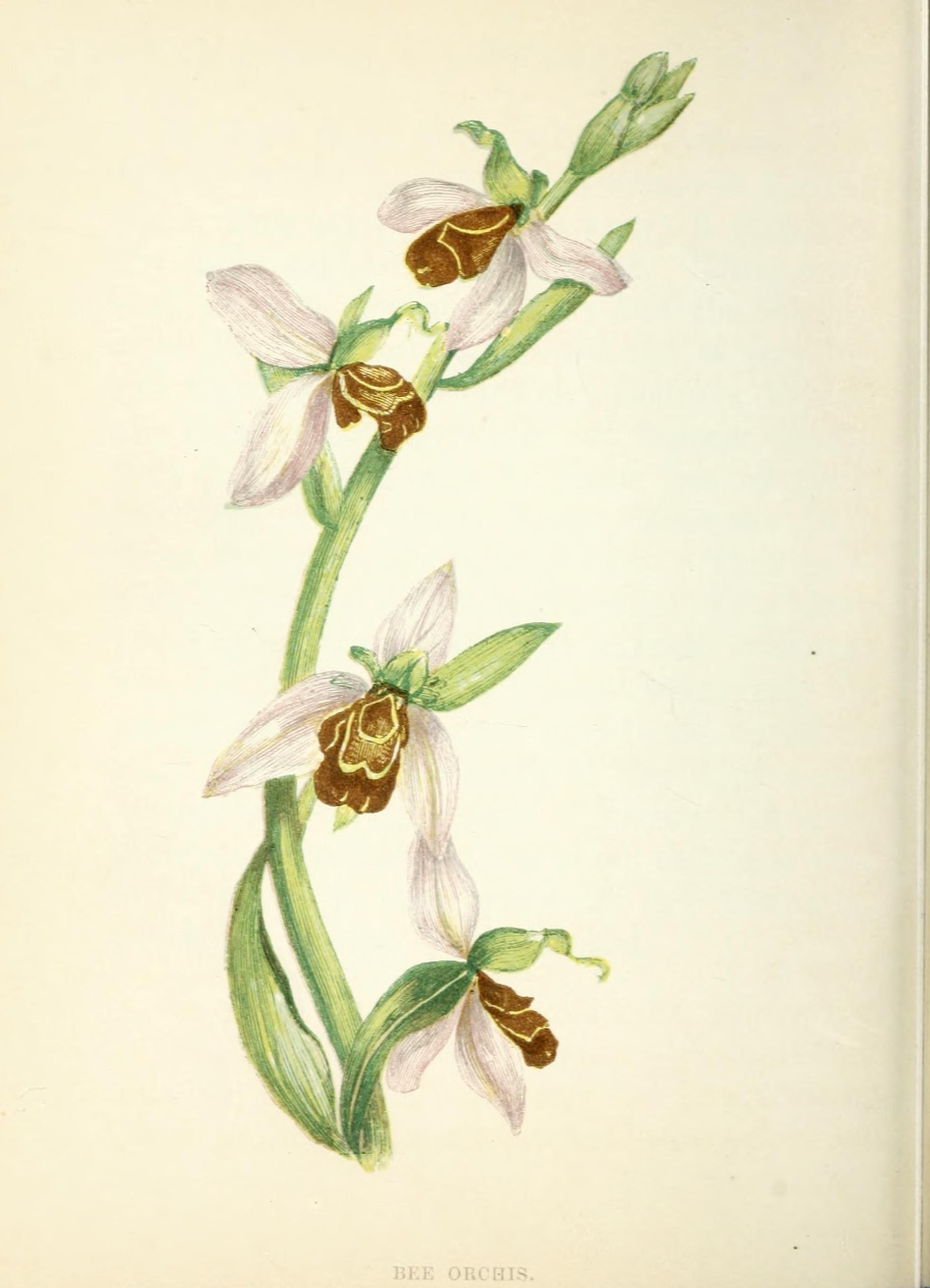
A bee orchid by Anne Pratt.

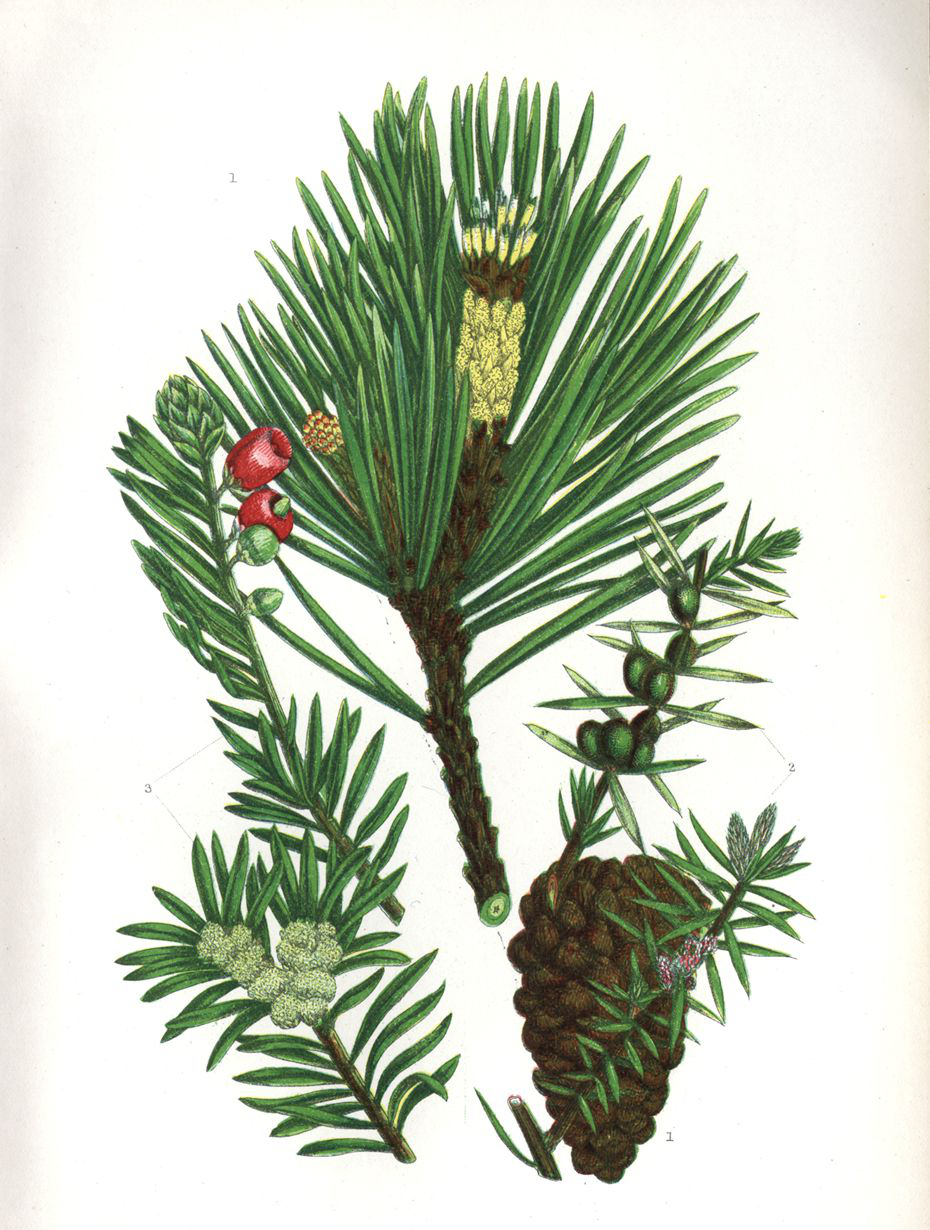
Plate 213 from "The Flowering Plants of Great Britain", showing Scotch Pine, Juniper and Yew.

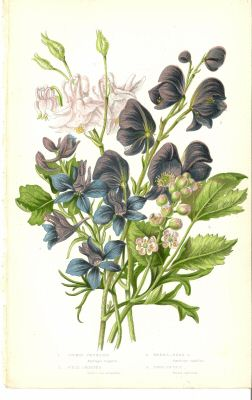
Columbine, larkspur and wolfsbane from Wild Flowers, 1852.
