= Philippe de Palézieux =

Swiss botanist (1871-1957)

Philippe-Auguste de Palézieux (1871, in Mies – 25 November 1957, in Geneva) was a Swiss botanist.

In 1891, he started classes in mechanical engineering at the Eidgenössisches Polytechnikum Zürich, afterwards studying botany at the Ludwig-Maximilians-Universität München as a pupil of Ludwig Radikofer. From 1900 to 1939, he was a privatgelehrter (private scholar) in Germany, and spent much of his time in Berlin-Dahlem. In 1939, he relocated to Geneva, where in 1943 he succeeded Constantin Andreas von Regel as curator of the "Herbarium Boissier".

From 1946 to 1949, he was president of the Société Botanique de Genève.

== Publications ==
- Anatomisch-systematische Untersuchung des Blattes der Melastomaceen mit Ausschluss der Triben der Microlicieen, Tibouchineen, Miconieen, 1899 (dissertation) – Anatomical-systematic study on the leaves of Melastomaceae, excluding the tribes of Microlicieae, Tibouchineae and Miconieae.
- Société Botanique de Genève. Compte-rendu des séances. Séance du 19 Novembre 1923. Un hybride nouveau du genre Scabiosa. Bull. Soc. Bot. Genève, 1923 – A new hybrid of the genus Scabiosa.
- Epervières nouvelles des Alpes et du Jura (with Karl Hermann Zahn); Bull. Soc. Bot. Genève, 1924 – New hawkweed from the Jura Mountains.
- Les plantes adventices des environs de Genève de l'herbier Paiche; Bull. Soc. Bot. Genève, 1944 – Weeds from the environs of Geneva in the Paiche herbarium.
