= Polly Mead Patraw =

American botanist

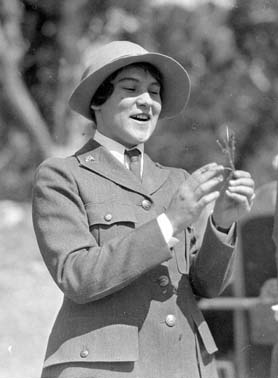
Patraw in 1931

Pauline "Polly" Mead Patraw (1904–2001) was an American botanist who spent her life conducting research of the plant life of the American Southwest. She was the first female ranger-naturalist at the Grand Canyon National Park and the second female ranger-naturalist in the National Park Service. She worked for the park from 1929 to 1931.

== Experiencing the Grand Canyon ==
Mead first visited the North Rim of the Grand Canyon in 1927 as part of an undergraduate western National Parks field trip. At the time she was earning her bachelor's degree in botany. After graduation, her benefactor and aunt gave her the choice to go to Europe or to return to the Grand Canyon. Polly chose to return to the Grand Canyon and spent the summers of 1928 and 1929 doing research there for her master's thesis. As part of her research, it was reported that she would take overnight trips exploring the canyon with nothing but a sleeping pad and a pistol. Her research focused on the causes of the abrupt tree line throughout the Kaibab Plateau – North Rim Parkway.

== Becoming a ranger-naturalist ==
Mead originally applied for a ranger-naturalist position at the US Forest Service but was denied, as the Forest Service did not hire women as ranger-naturalists. She then applied for the same position, but in the South Rim of the Canyon. She was accepted for the position and was sworn in on August 1, 1929, by her future husband, Preston Patraw. She was only the second ranger-naturalist in the National Park Service, and the first at the Grand Canyon.

== Later life ==
Mead was engaged to the park's assistant superintendent, Preston Patraw, in March 1931 and the couple married in May 1931. After marrying Preston, Polly Mead Patraw retired from her ranger-naturalist position to become a house wife. During an interview later, Mrs. Patraw was asked about this decision and was reported saying, "I just said, 'Yes, dear,' as we did in those days."

The Patraws moved from park to park as Preston was transferred to different departments, but Mead continued to study and write about botany. In 1952, she published the book Flowers of the Southwest Mesas, which included detailed drawings and descriptions of hundreds of flowering plants and sold over 65,000 copies.

In 1954, the Patraws returned to the Grand Canyon with the promotion of Preston Patraw to the Grand Canyon Superintendent.

After his retirement, the family moved to Santa Fe, New Mexico, where Mead died in 2001.

The standard author abbreviation Patraw is used to indicate this person as the author when citing a botanical name.
