= Alfred Reginald Pryor =

English botanist

- Born: 24 April 1839; Hatfield, Hertfordshire
- Died: 18 February 1881 (aged 41); Baldock
- Occupation: Botanist

Alfred Reginald Pryor (24 April 1839 – 18 February 1881) was an English botanist.

== Biography ==
Pryor was the eldest son of Alfred Pryor of Hatfield, Hertfordshire. He was born there on 24 April 1839, and received his early education at Tunbridge school, whence he went to University College, Oxford, graduating B.A. 26 June 1862. He soon grew interested in botany, and projected a new flora of his native county, which formed the main occupation of the remainder of his life. He was compelled by bad health to winter abroad, 1879–1880, and he died unmarried at Baldock on 18 February 1881. He left his herbarium, books and manuscript flora to the Hertfordshire Natural History Society, with a small sum of money to enable that society to print the manuscript. His detached papers, showing great critical knowledge of plants, for the most part came out in the ‘Journal of Botany,’ 1873–81. His ‘Flora of Hertfordshire, edited . . . by Benjamin Daydon Jackson, with an Introduction . . . by John Hopkinson and the Editor,’ was issued in 1887, London, 8vo.
