= August Adriaan Pulle =

Dutch botanist (1878–1955)

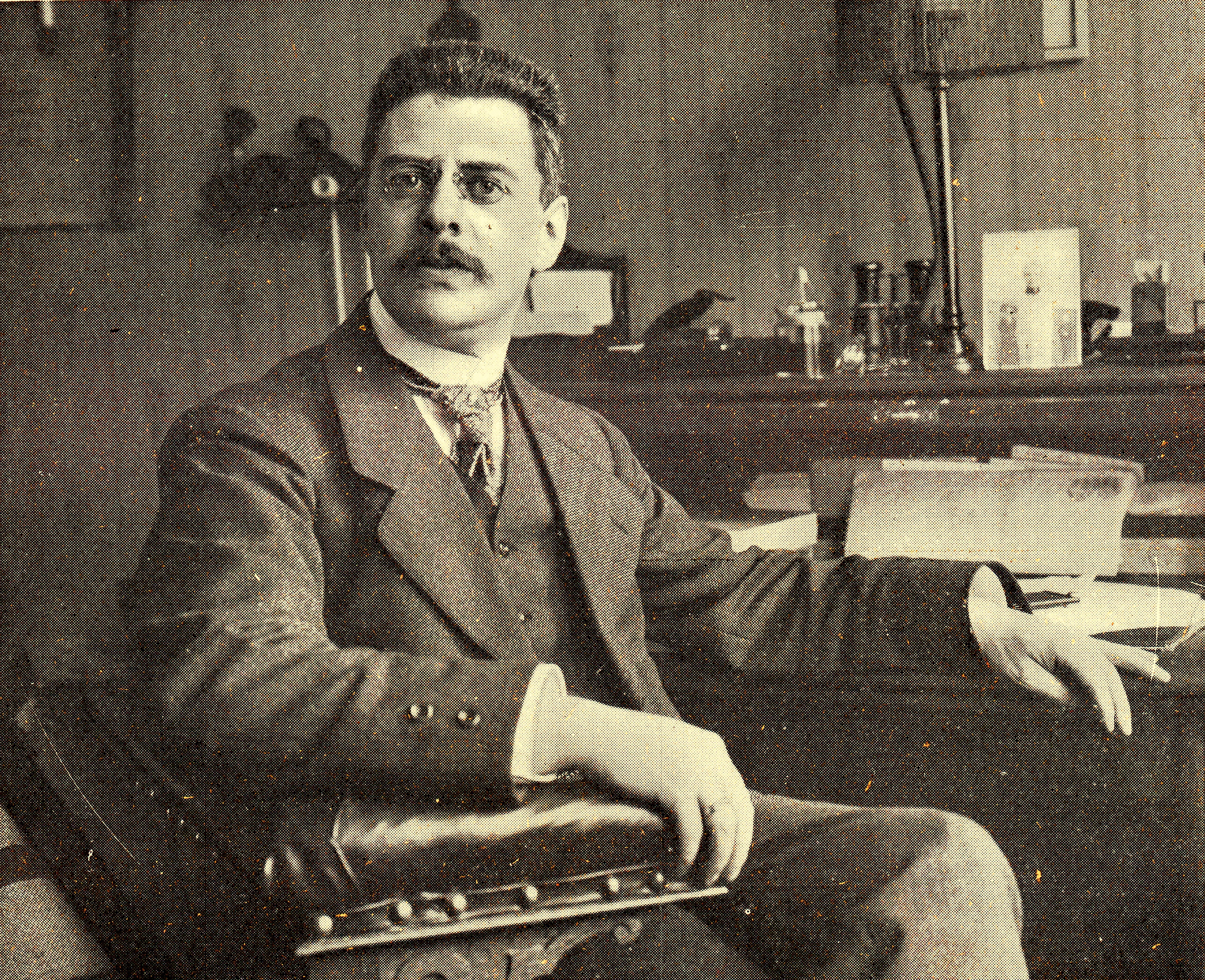
- Born: 1878
- Died: 1955
- Scientific career
- Fields: Botany
- Author abbrev. (botany): Pulle

August Adrian Pulle (Arnhem, January 10, 1878 - Utrecht, February 28, 1955) was a Dutch professor and botanist. He made important contributions to knowledge of the Flora of Suriname and the island of New Guinea.

== Personal life ==
=== Education ===
Pulle attended high school in Arnhem and studied pharmacy at the Utrecht University, in 1899 he took his bachelor's degree. He attended lectures of the plant physiologist F. A. F. C. Went and decided to continue his studies in zoology and botany. In 1900, Pulle was appointed as assistant at the botanical laboratory and herbarium, in 1904 he was appointed teacher of natural history at the Higher secondary school in Utrecht. In 1906 Pulle made lectures in botany and plant systematics and since 1908 also in plant geography, he took part (in 1902 and 1903) of the Saramacca expedition to Suriname and this study also determined the content of his thesis: "An enumeration of the vascular plants known from Surinam, together with their distribution and synonymy", which he got in 1906 a PhD doctorate in zoology and botany. That same year he made a second study trip to Buitenzorg, Java, Indonesia. He made part of the Third South New Guinea expedition in 1912 and 1913 and also wrote a travelogue about it (to the snowy mountains of New Guinea).

=== Career ===
On May 18, 1914, Pulle was appointed a professor of botany and plant geography at the University of Utrecht and director of the Botanical Museum and Herbarium there, he focused his research on the identification and description of the plants in Suriname and the former Dutch East Indies. In 1920 he went back to Suriname to specialize in the flora of this country, and in 1932 published the first part of his standard Flora of Suriname. Pulle was acting director of the Hortus, but, from 1920 to 1949, and the first director of the Cantonspark in Baarn. In 1938 he published the textbook "Compendium of terminology, nomenclature and systematics of seed plants". He was retired in 1948 but remained active almost until his death. Pulle was honorary president of the first South American Botanical Congress in Rio de Janeiro in 1938 and rector from 1929-1930.

== Selected works ==
- 1906. An Enumeration of the Vascular Plants known from Surinam, together with their Distribution and Synonymy. E.J. Brill. Leiden.
- 1911. Zakflora voor Suriname. Deel 1. Bulletin van het Koloniaal Museum te Haarlem. De Bussy. Amsterdam.
- 1912. A Nova Guinea. Résultats de l'Expédition Scientifique Néerlandaise à la Nouvelle Guinée.
- 1913. Naar het Sneeuwgebergte van Nieuw-Guinea. Maatsch. van Goede & Goedkoope Lect. Amsterdam
- 1914. Problemen der plantengeografie. Oosthoek. Utrecht.
- 1924. De derde internationale planten-geografische excursie. Vakblad voor Biologen. Bladzijde 65-74.
- 1932-1965 Flora of Suriname. (from 1956 to 1965, with J. Lanjouw as coeditor). Koninklijke Vereeniging Indisch Instituut
- 1938. Compendium van de terminologie, nomenclatuur en systematiek der zaadplanten. Utrecht.
- 1940. Overzicht van de lotgevallen en de werkzaamheden van de maatschappij in de eerste halve eeuw van haar bestaan. Leiden
- 1948. Afscheidscollege.
