= Dominique Pierrat =

Dominique Pierrat (11 February 1820, in Gerbamont – 19 November 1893, in Gerbamont) was a French naturalist, known for botanical and zoological investigations of Vosges.

He was a member of the Société Linnéenne de Normandie and the Société d'histoire naturelle de Colmar. With botanist Jean-Nicolas Boulay, he provided taxonomic descriptions of plants from the genus Rubus. In the field of ornithology, he was author of Catalogue des orthoptères observés en Alsace et dans la chaîne des Vosges ("Catalog of birds seen in Alsace and the Vosges Mountains", 1877).
