= Anthony Leo Primavesi =

Anthony Leo Primavesi (1917–2011) was an English botanist best known for his work on the Flora of Leicestershire. The standard author abbreviation Primavesi is used to indicate this person as the author when citing a botanical name.

== Publications ==
Primavesi, A. L. (1988). Flora of Leicestershire. City: Leicestershire Museums, Art Galleries and Records Service. ISBN 0850222303.
