= João Murça Pires =

Brazilian botanist

- Born: June 27, 1917; Bariri, Brazil
- Died: December 21, 1994 (aged 77); São Paulo
- Education: Luiz de Queiroz College of Agriculture, University of São Paulo
- Awards: Dom João VI Medal, 1976; Frederico Meneses Veiga Award, 1981
- Scientific career
- Fields: Botany
- Workplaces: Instituto Agronômico do Norte
- Author abbrev. (botany): Pires

João Murça Pires (1917-1994) was a Brazilian botanist, who worked principally at the Instituto Agronômico do Norte.

== Life ==
Pires was born in Bariri, Brazil on June 27, 1917. He received both his undergraduate (1942) and doctoral (1983) degrees from the Luiz de Queiroz College of Agriculture, University of São Paulo. He was a member of the Linnean Society of London and the Brazilian Academy of Sciences in. He served twice as the President of the Botanic Society of Brazil. He was awarded a John Simon Guggenheim Fellowship in 1982 in the field of plant sciences.

== Work ==
He initiated the herbarium and botanical section at the Instituto Agronômico do Norte and founded the Department of Botany and the herbaria at the Universidade de Brasília. He also helped restructure the Department of Botany at the Museu Paraense Emílio Goeldi in Belém, and the herbaria there is named after him. He collected, and described plants from the Amazon.

== Legacy ==
He is the authority for at least 109 taxa including: IPNI. List of plant names with authority Pires.
