= Johannes Palmberg =

Swedish botanist (c. 1640 – 1691)

- Born: c. 1640; Råby, Sweden
- Died: 1691; Turinge, Sweden
- Education: Åbo Royal Academy
- Known for: Serta Florea Svecana (1684) – early Swedish textbook in botany
- Scientific career
- Fields: Botany, Medicine
- Author abbrev. (botany): Palmberg

Johannes Palmberg (c. 1640 – 1691) was a Swedish botanist, physician, and priest. He published the early Swedish textbook in botany, Serta Florea Svecana or Swenske Örtekrantz, a Flora with alphabetically arranged pictures of the 150 most common trees and herbs together with descriptions of their use for medical purposes.

== Biography ==
Johannes Olai Palmberg was born as one of 20 siblings at the rectory at Råby-Rönö parish in Södermanland County, Sweden. His father, Olof Bononis Palmberg, was the local vicar.

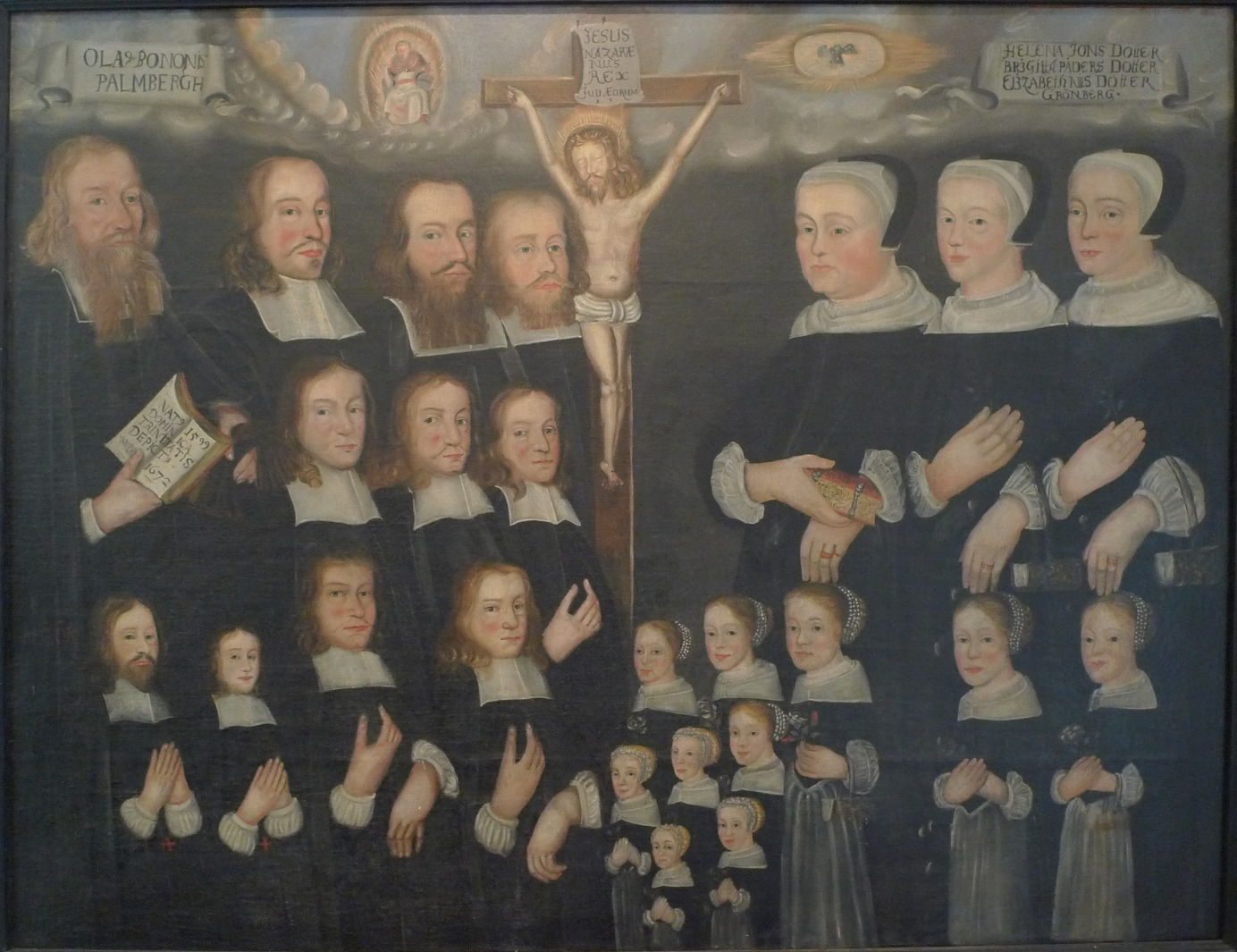
Family portrait in Tuna church, Sweden, showing Palmberg's siblings, mother and father

He studied medicine at The Royal Academy in Åbo between 1663 and 1668 under professor Daniel Achrelius (1644–1692) while working as de facto town doctor in the municipality.

Palmberg was appointed lecturer in medicine and physicae at Strängnäs gymnasium 1674, after a nomination dispute finally settled by King Charles XI. He was ordained priest in the Church of Sweden 1676, and acted as the headmaster at Strängnäs gymnasium 1678 and 1684. In 1688 he was appointed rector at Turinge Parish in Stockholm County after proposed by Count Erik Dahlbergh (1625–1703). He died in Turinge in his fifties.

=== Scientist and botanist ===
Palmberg published in 1671 a dissertation in Latin on scurvy – Exercitatiomedica brevissimam Scorbuti delineationem exhibeus. However, it was his floral textbook – Serta Florea Svecana or Swenske Örtekrantz (1684) – that has contributed the most to life sciences. It was used in Sweden as textbook in botany during sixty years before replaced by Carl Linnaeus's Flora Svecica in 1745 and was the source of Linnaeus's early botanical understanding. Örtekrantzen was published in three editions, the most recent as late as 1738.

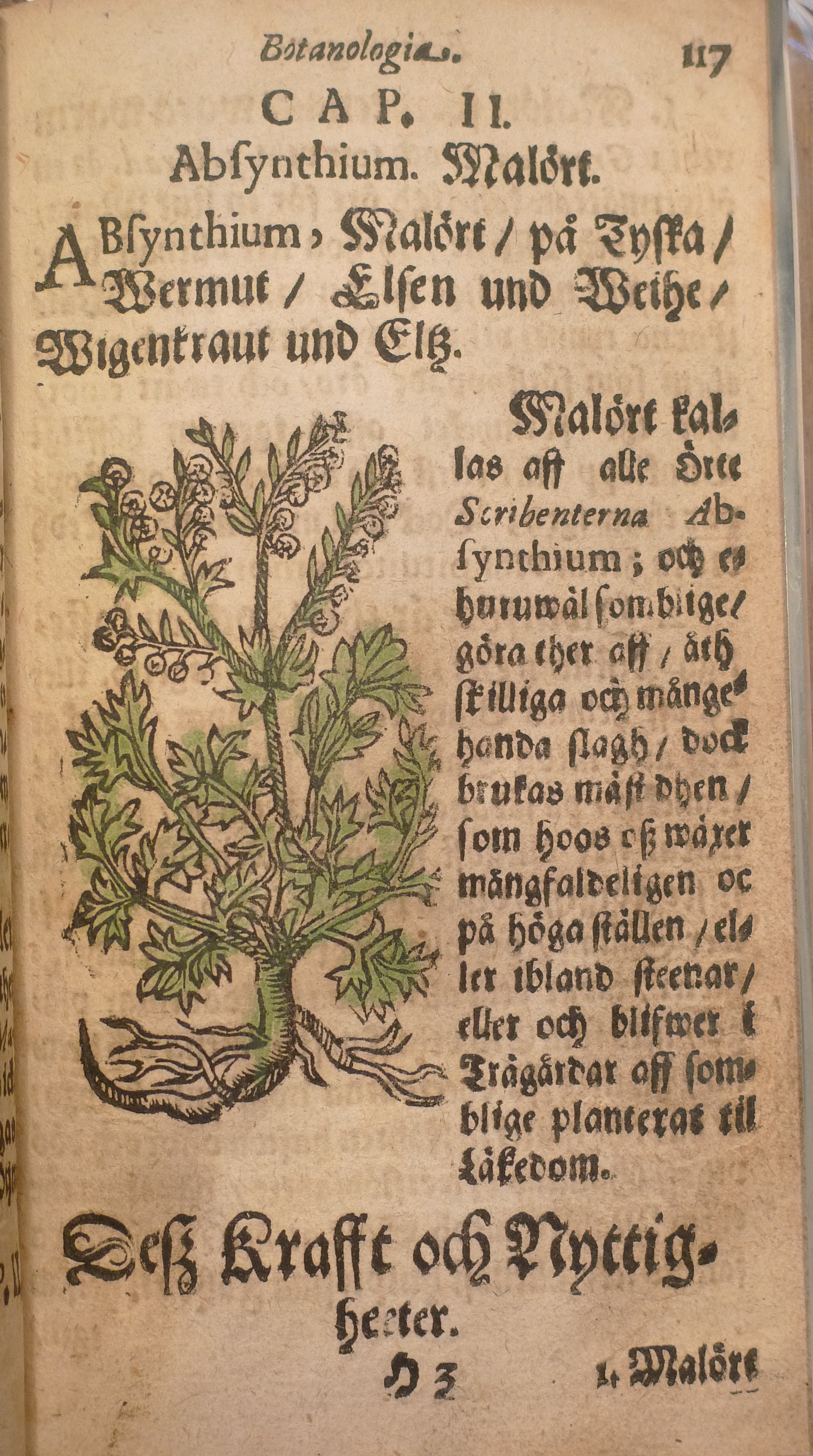
From Serta Florea Svecana – Absinthium

=== Public educator ===
Palmberg was also an early public educator and published a number of popular scientific essays in the Swedish language which were included in the almanacs of 1670–1672 with medical advice based on Hippocratic medicine. The therapeutic use of herbs such as camille flowers, ginger, valeriana, wormwood and vervain is described as well as blood-letting, purging and cupping therapy. In these essays Palmberg strongly advocated against quackery and the use of astrology for medical divination.

== Publications ==
- Serta Florea Svecana eller Swenske Örtekrantz (1684).
- Exercitatio medica brevissimam Scorbuti delineationem exhibeus (1671)
- Sundheetzskötsel för gemeent folk – popular scientific essay published in 1670 on diagnostics and treatment of common diseases.
- Johannis Palmbergs Sundheetzskötzels Continuation popular scientific essay published 1671 on the use of blood-letting.
- Johannis Palmbergs Sundheetzskötzels Continuation : on what to keep in a domestic pharmacy and how to maintain health if physicians are not available (1672)
