= Theodor Peckolt =

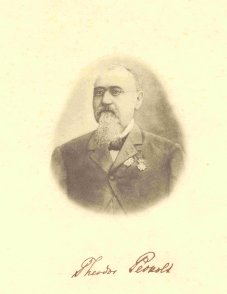

Theodor Peckolt (1822–1912) was a German-born naturalist, botanist, phytochemist and pharmacist who worked in Brazil from 1847 to 1912, analyzing the chemical and medicinal properties of Brazilian flora.
