= William Pamplin =

English bookseller, publisher and botanist (1806-1899)

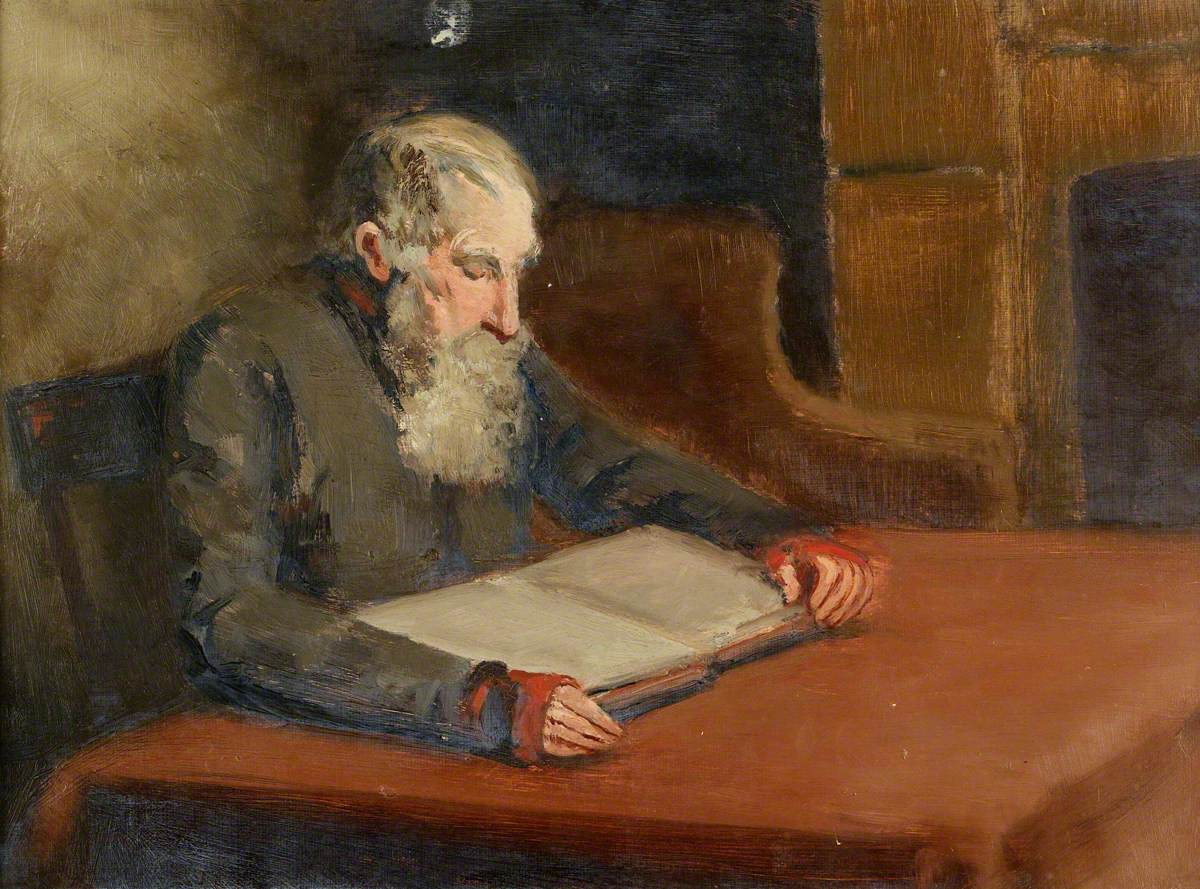
Portrait of William Pamplin c.1891

William Pamplin (5 August 1806 – 9 September 1899) was an English bookseller, publisher and botanist. Hunneman introduced many non-native European plants to the United Kingdom.

Born in 1806 in Chelsea, Pamplin was the son of William Pamplin (1768–1844), a nurseryman.

Pamplin wrote for the Magazine of Natural History, and became editor of The Phytologist, owned by John Hunneman. Pamplin married his daughter Caroline, and took over the magazine. In the 1850th he distributed two exsiccata-like series, namely Flora Dalmatica and Vicinity of Adelaide 1846.

Pamplin was also involved with the explorer Ludwig Leichhardt.

The standard author abbreviation Pamplin is used to indicate this person as the author when citing a botanical name.
