= Acid (disambiguation) =

An acid is any chemical that, when dissolved in water, gives a solution with a pH of less than 7.0.

Acid or ACID may also refer to:

== Science ==
- Corrosive substance, commonly (though imprecisely) referred to as an acid
- Lysergic acid diethylamide (LSD), a semisynthetic, psychedelic drug commonly referred to as acid

== Computing ==
- ACID (atomicity, consistency, isolation, durability), an initialism for the transactional properties of database management systems
- Acid1, a web browser test page
  - Acid2
  - Acid3
- Acid Pro, professional digital audio workstation software
- Acid (computer virus), a computer virus

== Music ==
- "Acid-like", the sound produced by the Roland TB-303 electronic music synthesizer

=== Genres ===
- Psychedelic music, inspired by the use of psychedelic drugs including LSD
- Acid (electronic music)
- Acid rock, originating in the mid-1960s
- Acid house, originating in the mid-1980s
- Acid jazz, originating in the mid-1980s
- Acid trance, originating in the early to mid-1990s
- Acid techno, originating in the early 1990s
- Neo-psychedelia, originating in the early 1980s, and sometimes called acid punk
- Stoner rock, originating in the mid-1990s, and sometimes called acid metal
- Psychedelic funk, originating in the late-1960s, and sometimes called acid funk

=== Bands ===
- Acid (Belgian band), a Belgian heavy metal band
- Acid (Japanese band), a Japanese band
- Acid (hip-hop group), a Burmese hip-hop group
- The Acid, an electronic music band

=== Songs ===
- "Acid", by Venom from the 1991 album Temples of Ice
- "Acid", by Red Harvest from the 1992 album Nomindsland
- "Acid", by Esham from the 1992 album Judgement Day Vol. 1: Day
- "Acid", by Toad the Wet Sprocket from the 1997 album MOM II: Music for Our Mother Ocean
- "Acid", by Emm Gryner from the 1998 album Public
- "Acid", by Gigi D'Agostino from the 1999 EP Tanzen
- "Acid", by G.G.F.H. from the 2001 album The Very Beast of G.G.F.H. Vol. 1
- "Acid", by Lil Wyte from the 2003 album Doubt Me Now
- "Acid", by Ghost Town from the 2014 album The After Party
- "Acid", by Blancmange from the 2015 album Semi Detached
- "Acid", by Power Trip from the 2018 album Opening Fire: 2008–2014
- "Acid", by Jockstrap from the 2020 EP Wicked City
- "Acidic", by Slipknot from the 2022 album The End, So Far
- "Acid", a track on Richard Pryor's 1976 comedy album Bicentennial Nigger

== Film ==
- Acid (2018 film), a Russian drama film
- Acid (2023 film), a Franco-Belgian fantasy drama film
- Acid (novel), a 2016 novel by Sangeetha Sreenivasan
- Association du cinéma indépendant pour sa diffusion (ACID), film association

== People ==
- Acid Betty, Jewish-American drag queen
- Acid (YouTuber), Belgian YouTuber

== Other uses ==
- ACiD Productions, an underground digital art group also known as ANSI Creators in Demand

== See also ==
- Acid test (disambiguation)
- Acid attack (disambiguation)
