= Buxus 'Green Velvet' =

Ornamental plant cultivar

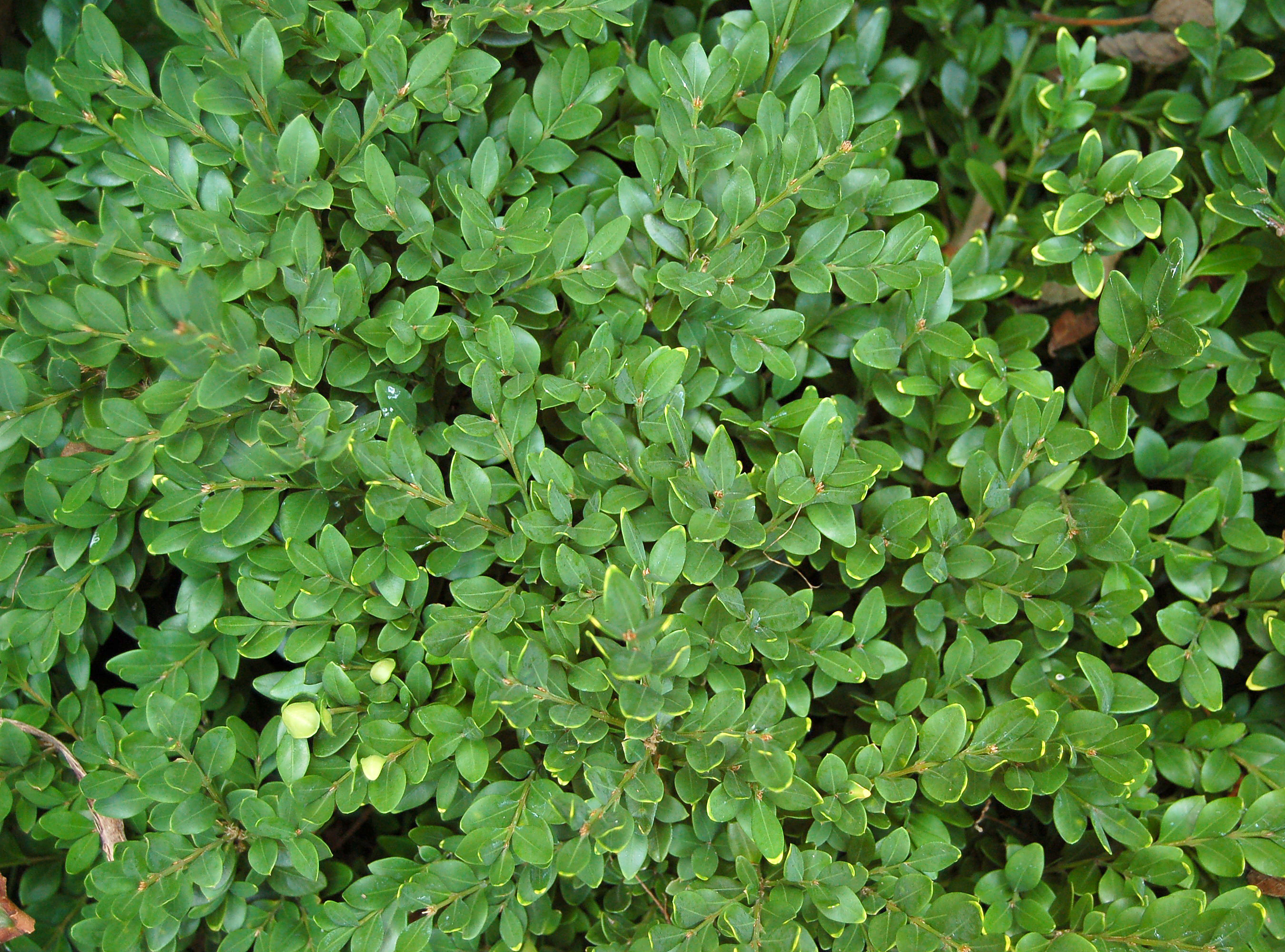
- Genus: Buxus
- Hybrid parentage: B. sempervirens × B. microphylla var. koreana
- Cultivar: 'Green Velvet'

Buxus 'Green Velvet' or Green Velvet Boxwood is a hybrid boxwood cultivar. Its parent species are B. sempervirens × B. microphylla var. koreana. It is a broad, compact shrub that grows to 3 to 4 feet (0.91 to 1.22 m) tall and 3 to 4 feet (0.91 to 1.22 m) wide. The leaves are evergreen, glossy and borne oppositely. It has small pale green flowers. If not pruned this shrub will develop a natural rounded shape. Buxus Green Velvet is a hybrid between Buxus sempervirens and buxus microphylla var. Koreana.

== Care ==
Green Velvet Boxwoods require partial to full sun in order to survive. Water the plant at least once weekly, more in severe heat. The soil needs to be moist but not wet. The plant should be watered daily if kept in a container. Buxus Green Velvet can survive in cold temperatures ranging from -10 degrees Fahrenheit to 0 degrees Fahrenheit

== See also ==
- Boxwood blight
- Box tree moth
- Gothic boxwood miniature
