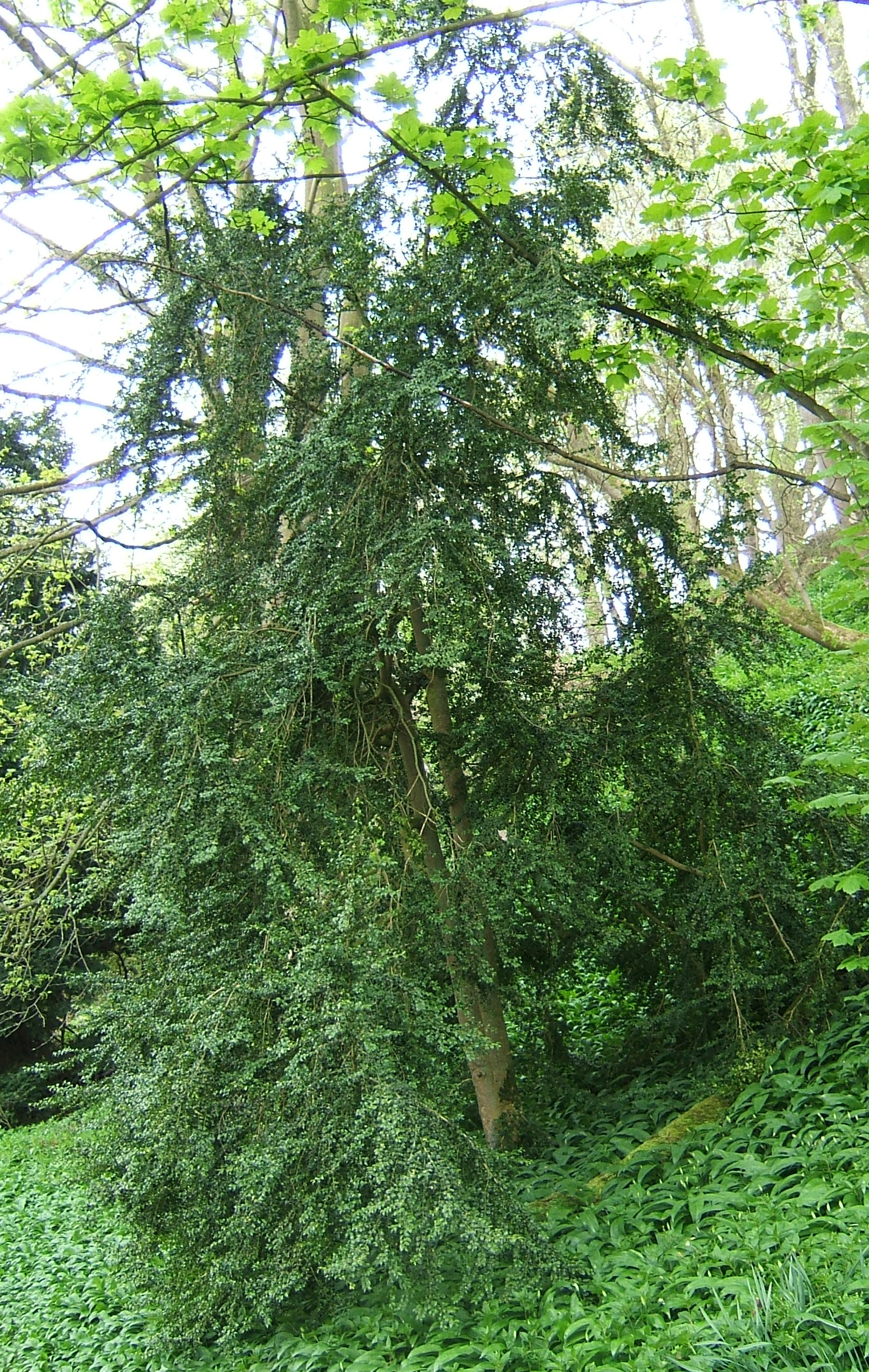
- Common box, Buxus sempervirens

Scientific classification
- Kingdom: Plantae
- Clade: Tracheophytes
- Clade: Angiosperms
- Clade: Eudicots
- Order: Buxales
- Family: Buxaceae
- Genus: Buxus; L.

Species
- About 70 species; see text

= Buxus =

Genus of flowering plants

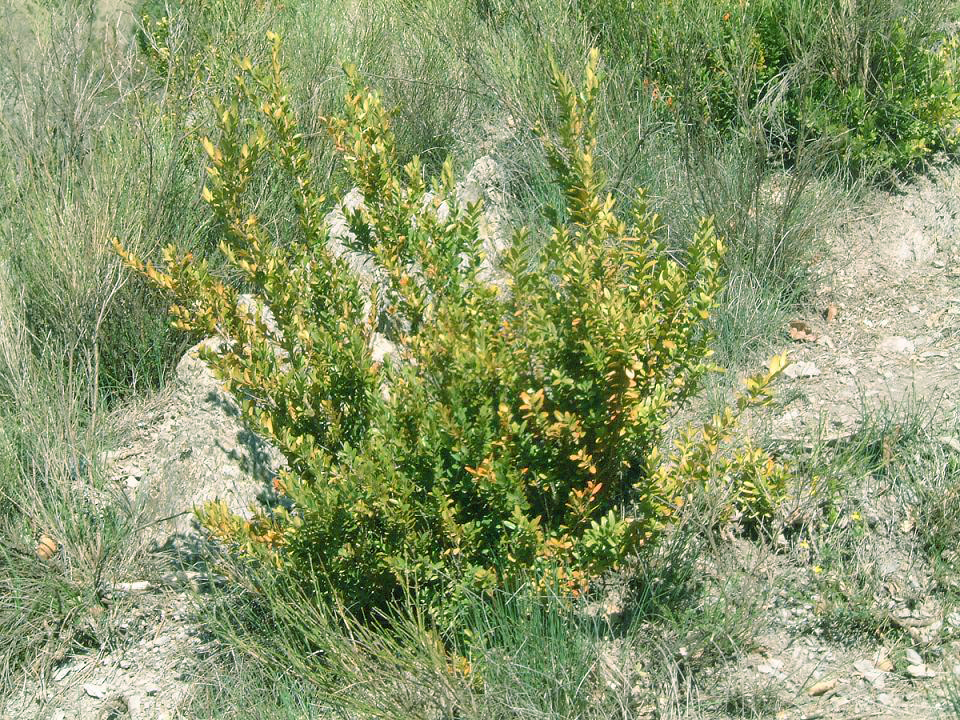
Buxus sempervirens

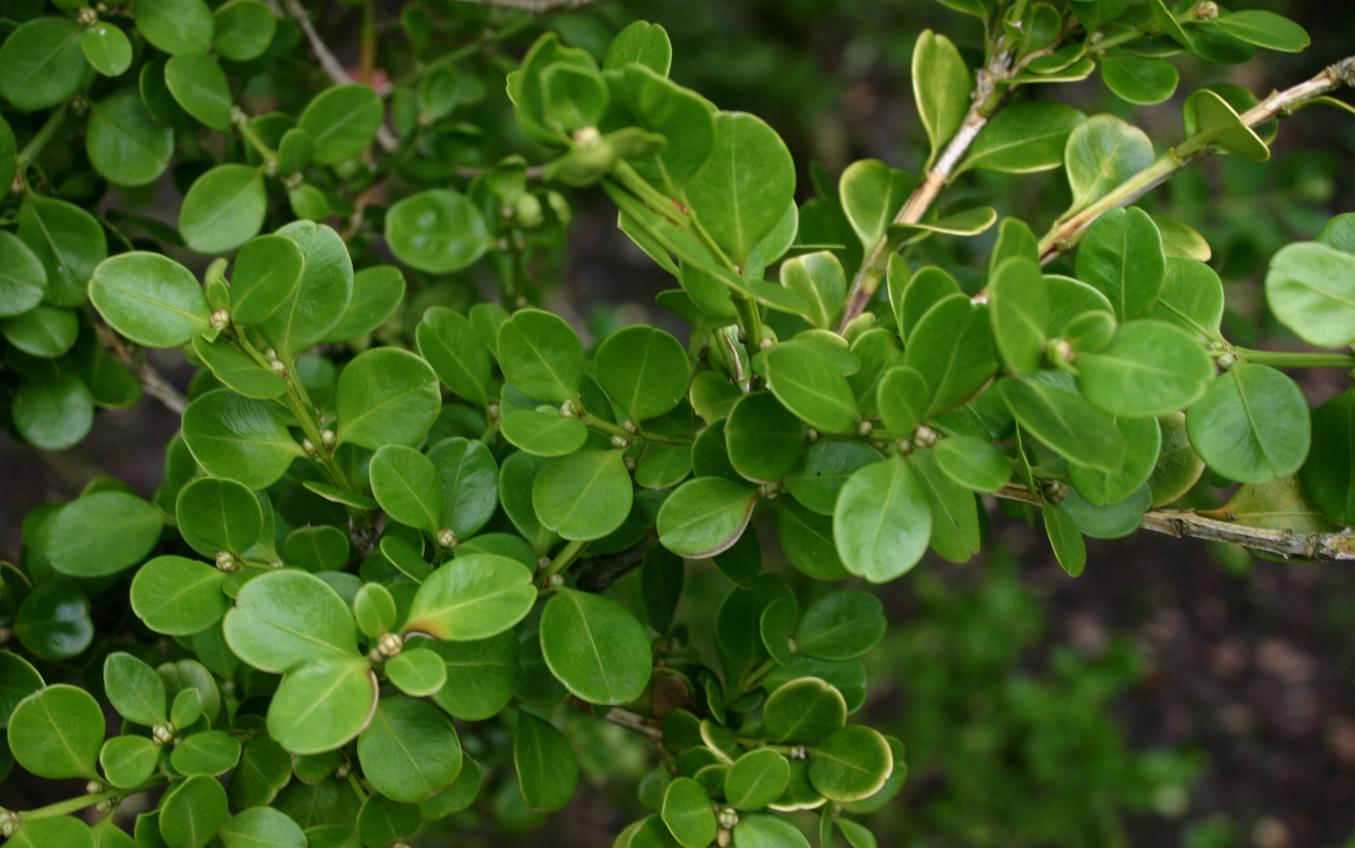
Buxus sinica foliage

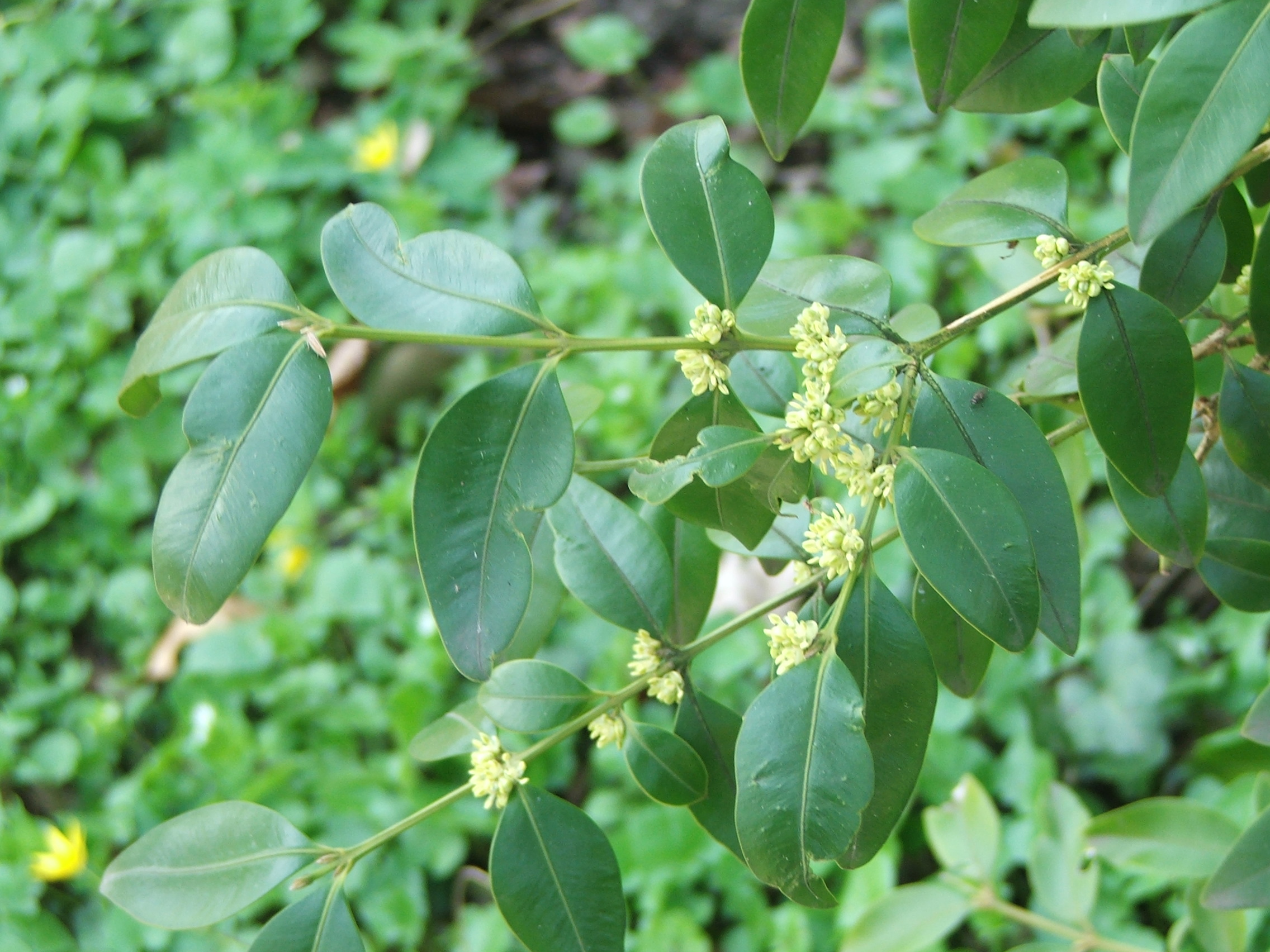
Buxus henryi foliage

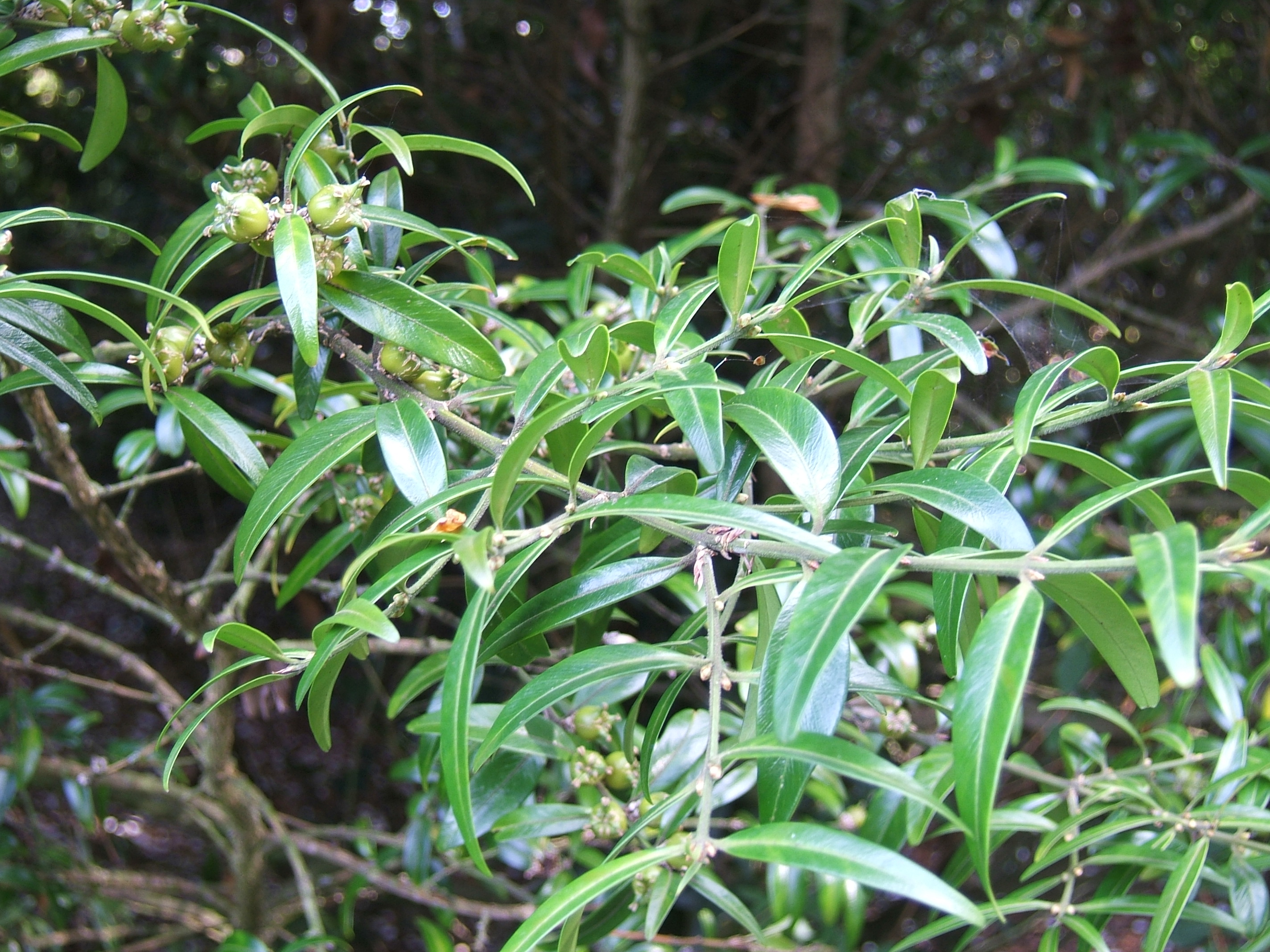
Buxus wallichiana foliage and seed capsules

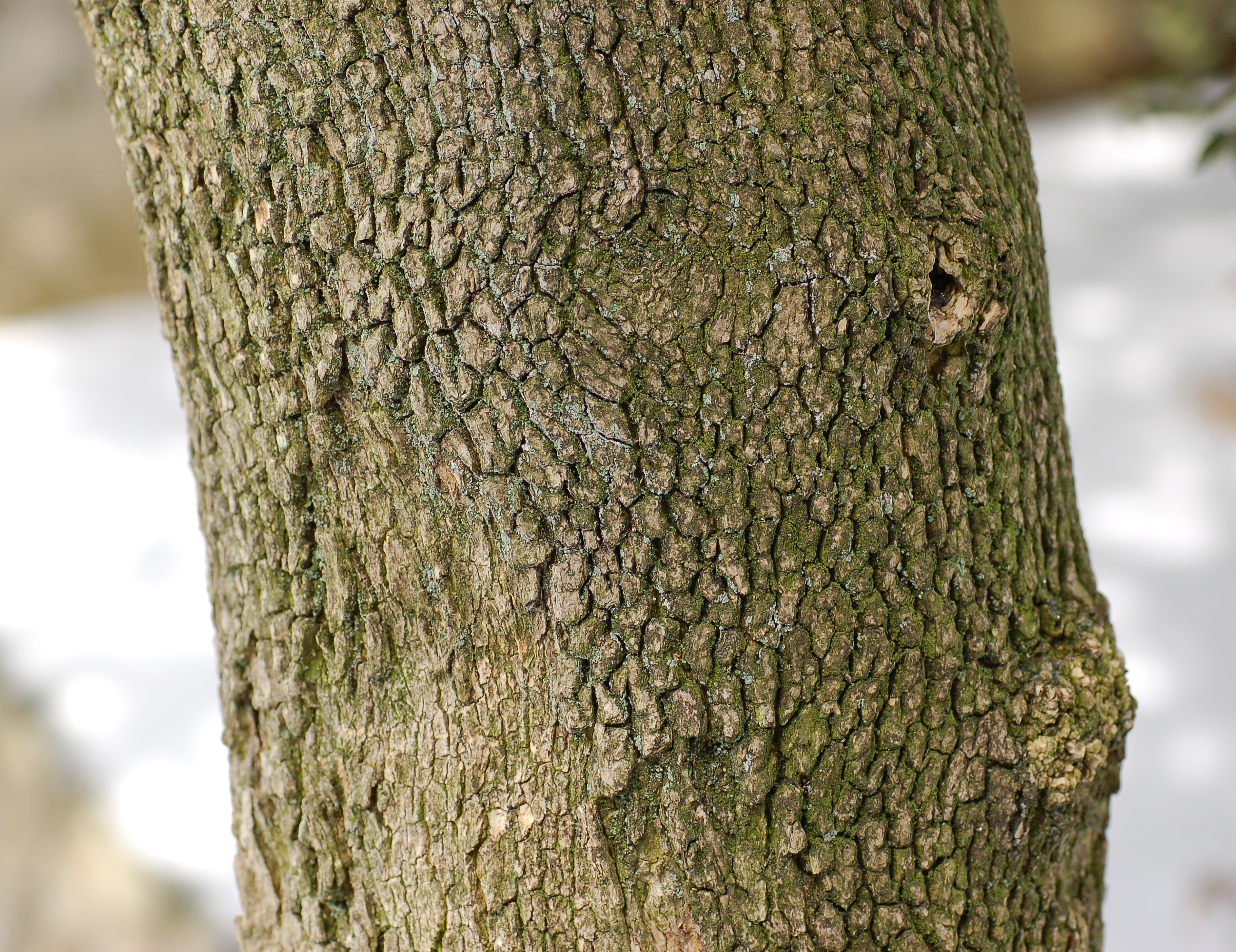
Buxus sempervirens bark

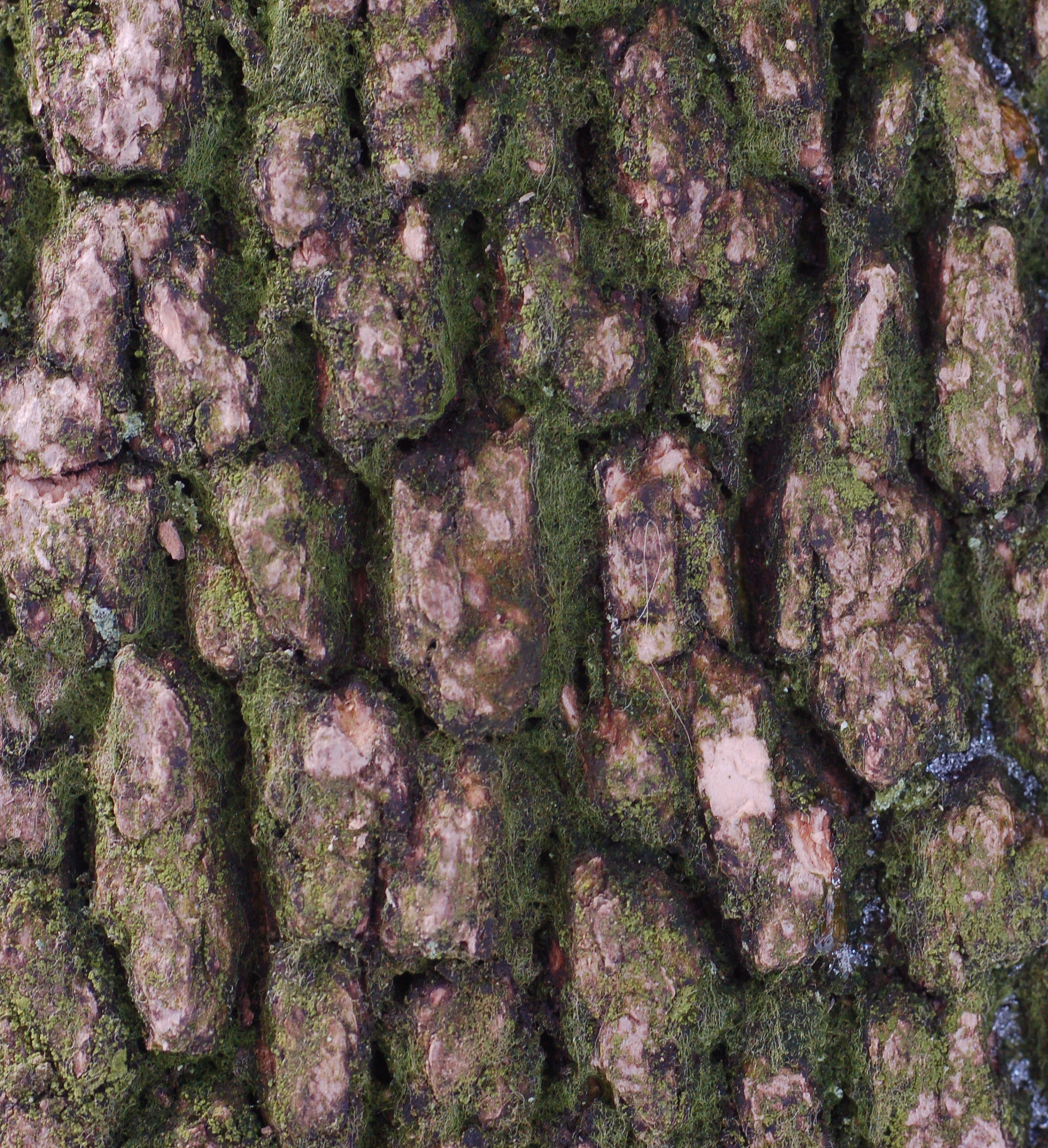
Buxus sempervirens bark closeup

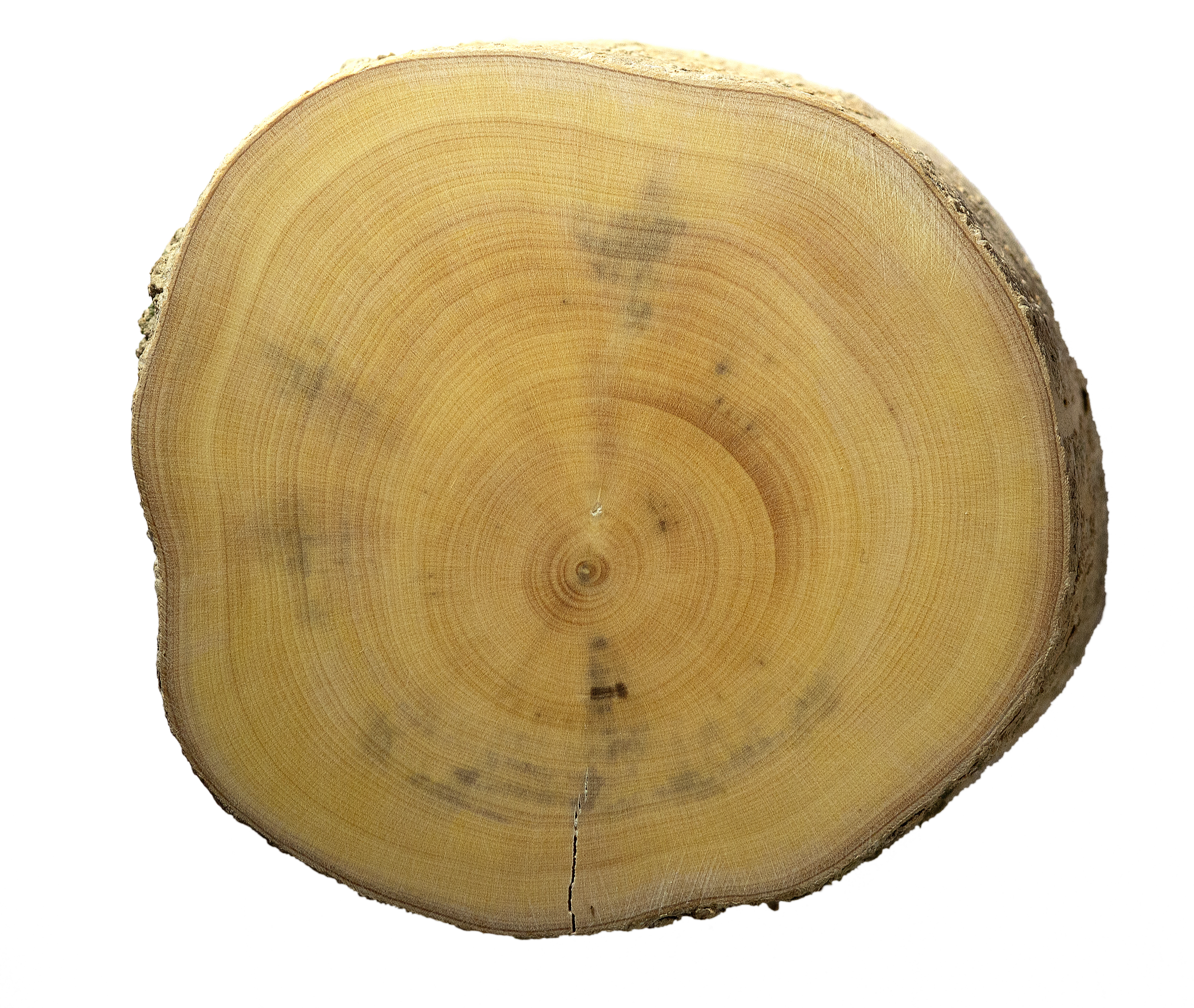
Buxus sempervirens - MHNT

Buxus is a genus of about seventy species in the family Buxaceae. Common names include box and boxwood.

The boxes are native to western and southern Europe, southwest, southern and eastern Asia, Africa, Madagascar, northernmost South America, Central America, Mexico and the Caribbean, with the majority of species being tropical or subtropical; only the European and some Asian species are frost-tolerant. Centres of diversity occur in Cuba (about 30 species), China (17 species) and Madagascar (9 species).

They are slow-growing evergreen shrubs and small trees, growing to 2–12 m (rarely 15 m) tall. The leaves are opposite, rounded to lanceolate, and leathery; they are small in most species, typically 1.5–5 cm long and 0.3–2.5 cm broad, but up to 11 cm long and 5 cm broad in B. macrocarpa. The flowers are small and yellow-green, monoecious with both sexes present on a plant. The fruit is a small capsule 0.5–1.5 cm long (to 3 cm in B. macrocarpa), containing several small seeds.

The genus splits into three genetically distinct sections, each section in a different region, with the Eurasian species in one section, the African (except northwest Africa) and Madagascan species in the second, and the American species in the third. The African and American sections are genetically closer to each other than to the Eurasian section.

The genomes of Buxus austro-yunnanensis and Buxus sinica have been sequenced.

== Selected species ==
=== Europe, northwest Africa, Asia ===
- Buxus austro-yunnanensis (Yunnan box; southwest China)
- Buxus balearica (Balearic box; Balearic Islands, southern Spain, northwest Africa)
- Buxus bodinieri (China)
- Buxus cephalantha (China)
- Buxus cochinchinensis (Malaysia, Vietnam)
- Buxus colchica (Georgian box; western Caucasus; considered also a syn. of B. sempervirens)
- Buxus hainanensis (Hainan box; China: Hainan)
- Buxus harlandii (Harland's box; southern China, Vietnam)
- Buxus hebecarpa (China)
- Buxus henryi (Henry's box; China)
- Buxus hyrcana (Caspian box; Alborz, eastern Caucasus; considered also a syn. of B. sempervirens)
- Buxus ichangensis (China)
- Buxus latistyla (China)
- Buxus linearifolia (China)
- Buxus megistophylla (China)
- Buxus microphylla (Japanese box; Korea, China, Vietnam; long cultivated in Japan)
- Buxus mollicula (China)
- Buxus myrica (China, Vietnam)
- Buxus papillosa (western Himalaya)
- Buxus pubiramea (China)
- Buxus rivularis (Philippines)
- Buxus rolfei (Borneo)
- Buxus rugulosa (China, eastern Himalaya)
- Buxus rupicola (Malaysia)
- Buxus sempervirens (common box or European box; western and southern Europe, except far southwest)
- Buxus sinica (Chinese box; China, Korea, Japan)
- Buxus stenophylla (China)
- Buxus wallichiana (Himalayan box; Himalaya)

=== Africa, Madagascar ===
- Buxus acuminata (Africa: Zaire; syn. Notobuxus acuminata)
- Buxus calcarea (Madagascar endemic)
- Buxus capuronii (Madagascar endemic)
- Buxus hildebrandtii (eastern Africa: Somalia, Ethiopia)
- Buxus humbertii (Humbert's box; Madagascar endemic)
- Buxus itremoensis (Madagascar endemic)
- Buxus lisowskii (Congo)
- Buxus macowanii (Cape box; eastern and northern South Africa)
- Buxus macrocarpa (Madagascar endemic)
- Buxus madagascarica (Madagascan box; Madagascar, Comoros)
- Buxus monticola (Madagascar endemic)
- Buxus moratii (Madagascar, Comoros)
- Buxus natalensis (Natal box; eastern South Africa; syn. Notobuxus natalensis)
- Buxus nyasica (Malawi)
- Buxus obtusifolia (eastern Africa; syn. Notobuxus obtusifolia)
- Buxus rabenantoandroi (Madagascar endemic; syn. B. angustifolia GE Schatz & Lowry non Mill.)

=== Americas ===
- Buxus aneura (Cuba)
- Buxus arborea (Jamaica)
- Buxus bartletii (Central America)
- Buxus brevipes (Cuba)
- Buxus citrifolia (Venezuela)
- Buxus crassifolia (Cuba)
- Buxus ekmanii (Cuba)
- Buxus excisa (Cuba)
- Buxus heterophylla (Cuba)
- Buxus imbricata (Cuba)
- Buxus lancifolia (Mexico)
- Buxus macrophylla (Central America)
- Buxus mexicana (Mexico)
- Buxus muelleriana (Cuba)
- Buxus olivacea (Cuba)
- Buxus pilosula (Cuba)
- Buxus portoricensis (Puerto Rico)
- Buxus pubescens (Mexico)
- Buxus rheedioides (Cuba)
- Buxus vahlii (Vahl's box or smooth box; Puerto Rico; syn. B. laevigata)

== Selected cultivars ==
- Buxus 'Green Velvet'
- Buxus microphylla var. koreana 'Winter Gem'

== Uses ==
=== Cultivation ===
Box plants are commonly grown as hedges and for topiary.

In Britain and mainland Europe, box is subject to damage from caterpillars of Cydalima perspectalis which can devastate a box hedge within a short time. This is a recently introduced species first noticed in Europe in 2007 and in the UK in 2008 but spreading. There were 3 UK reports of infestation in 2011, 20 in 2014 and 150 in the first half of 2015.

=== Wood carving ===
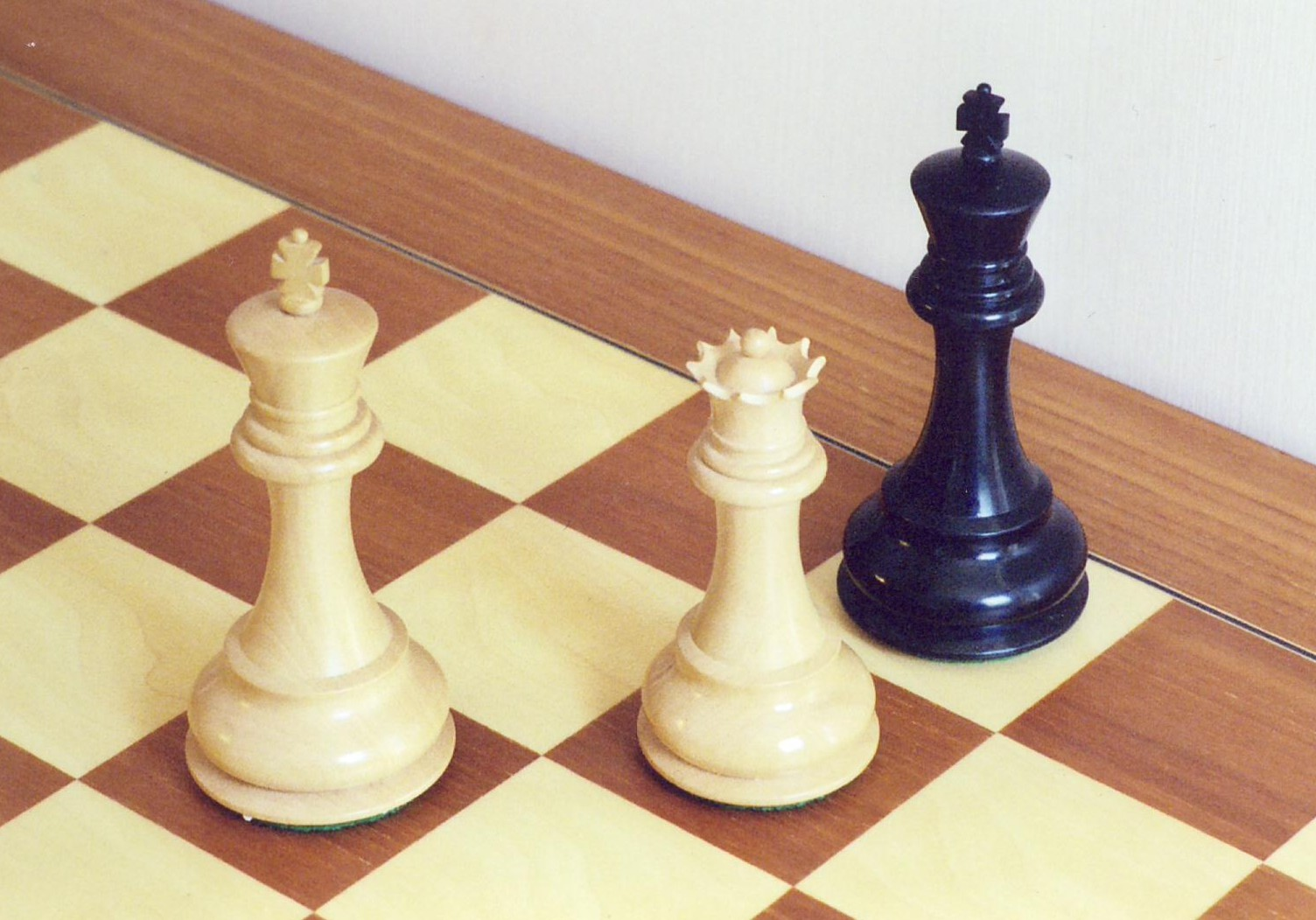
The white pieces are made of boxwood. The black piece is ebonized, not made of ebony.

Owing to its fine grain it is a good wood for fine wood carving, although this is limited by the small sizes available. It is also resistant to splitting and chipping, and thus useful for decorative or storage boxes.

Traditional Japanese boxwood combs are called Tsuge Gushi and have been in production since the Heian Period.

As a timber or wood for carving it is "boxwood" in all varieties of English.

Owing to the relatively high density of the wood, boxwood is often used for chess pieces; unstained boxwood for the white pieces, and stained ('ebonized') boxwood for the black pieces in lieu of ebony.

The extremely fine endgrain of box makes it suitable for woodblock printing and woodcut blocks, for which it was the usual material in Europe. In the 16th century, boxwood was used to create intricate decorative carvings, including intricate rosary prayer beads. As of 2016, the largest collection of these carvings is at the Art Gallery of Ontario in Toronto.

High quality wooden spoons have usually been carved from box, with beech being the usual cheaper substitute.

=== Musical instruments ===
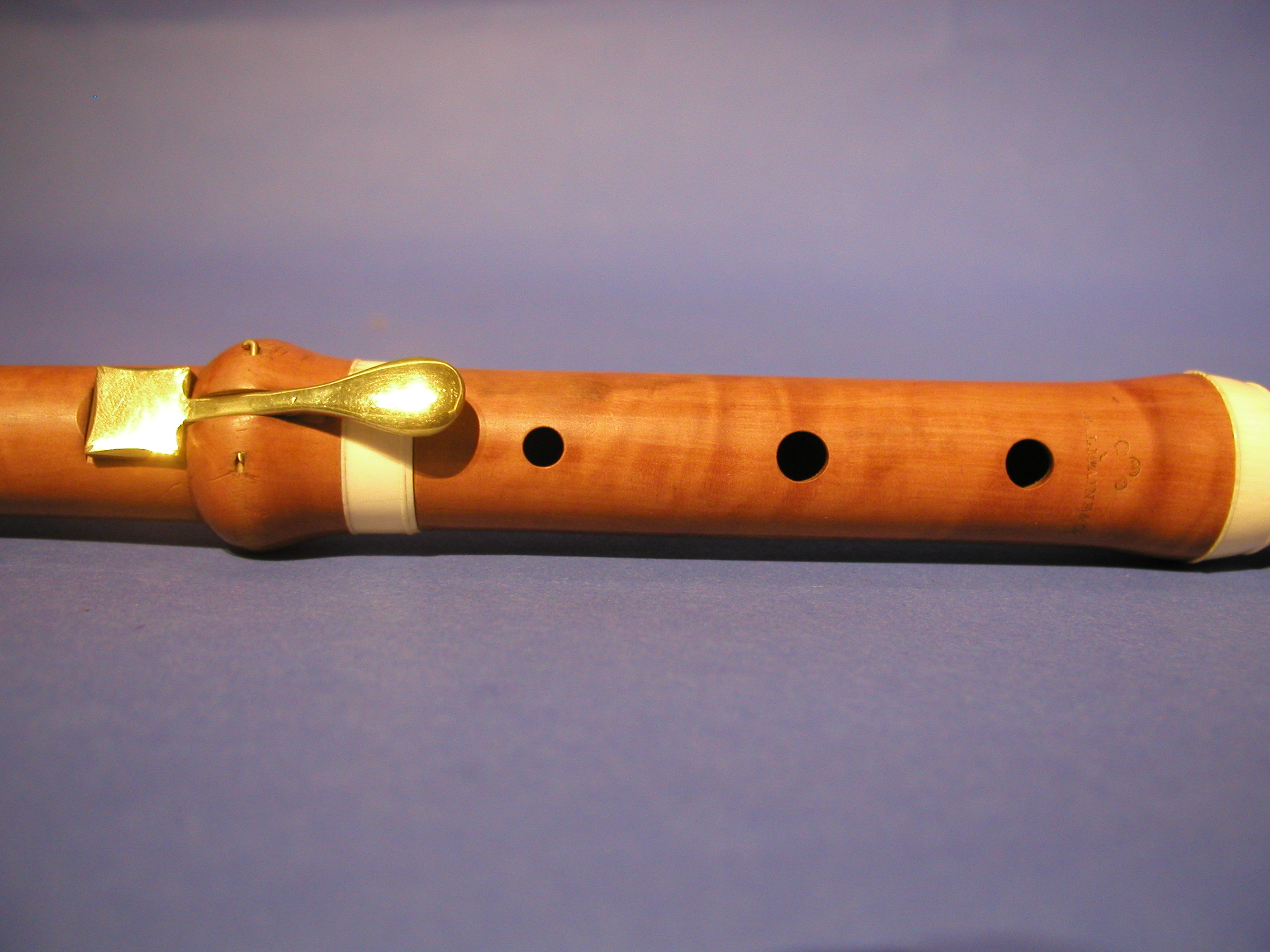
19th-century English flute made of boxwood (detail)

Due to its high density, resistance to chipping, and relatively low cost, boxwood has been used to make parts for various stringed instruments since antiquity. It is mostly used to make tailpieces, chin rests and tuning pegs, but may be used for a variety of other parts as well. Other woods used for this purpose are rosewood and ebony.

Boxwood was a common material for the manufacture of recorders in the eighteenth century, and a large number of mid- to high-end instruments made today are produced from one or other species of boxwood. Boxwood was once a popular wood for other woodwind instruments, and was among the traditional woods for Great Highland bagpipes before tastes turned to imported dense tropical woods such as cocuswood, ebony, and African blackwood.

=== Historical ===
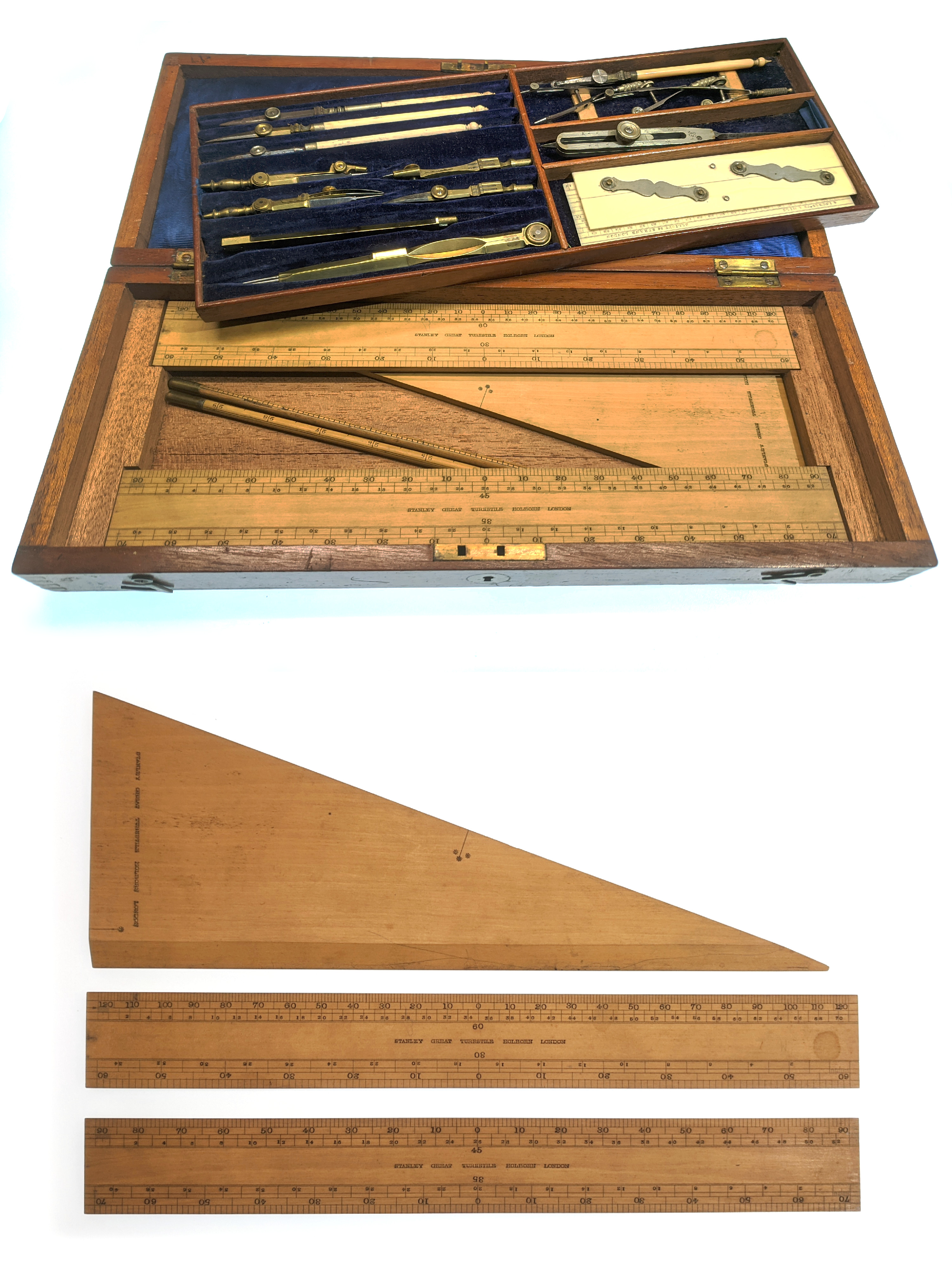
Boxwood mathematical drawing instruments (Marquois scales)

Prior to the development of plastics, boxwood was important to a wide range of fields from engineering to arts, construction to cartography, due to its density and stability making it one of the best available materials for measurement scales and technical drawing rulers. Alternative materials of the era were ivory, paper, and metal. Disadvantages of ivory included that it would slightly shrink over time, the size and shape of blanks was limited by that of the tusk, and supply was limited. Paper was soft, difficult to use, and did not last long. Metal marked the surface it was being used on and increased expense. Ebony was another dense and stable wood prized for drawing instruments but typically only if scales were not necessary; boxwood's light color contrasted much better with scales.

Devices made of boxwood included set squares, scale rulers, yardsticks, folding rulers, slide rules, Marquois scales, T-squares, protractors, and a wide range of other measuring, metering, and straight-edge devices and tools, as well as general functional items such as combs, weaving shuttles, etc.

A boxwood rule generally refers to a style of folding ruler with brass hinge(s).

General Thomas F. Meagher decorated the hats of the men of the Irish Brigade with boxwood during the American Civil War, as he could find no shamrock.

== See also ==
- Bibliography of hedges and topiary
- Boxwood blight
- Cydalima perspectalis – box tree moth
