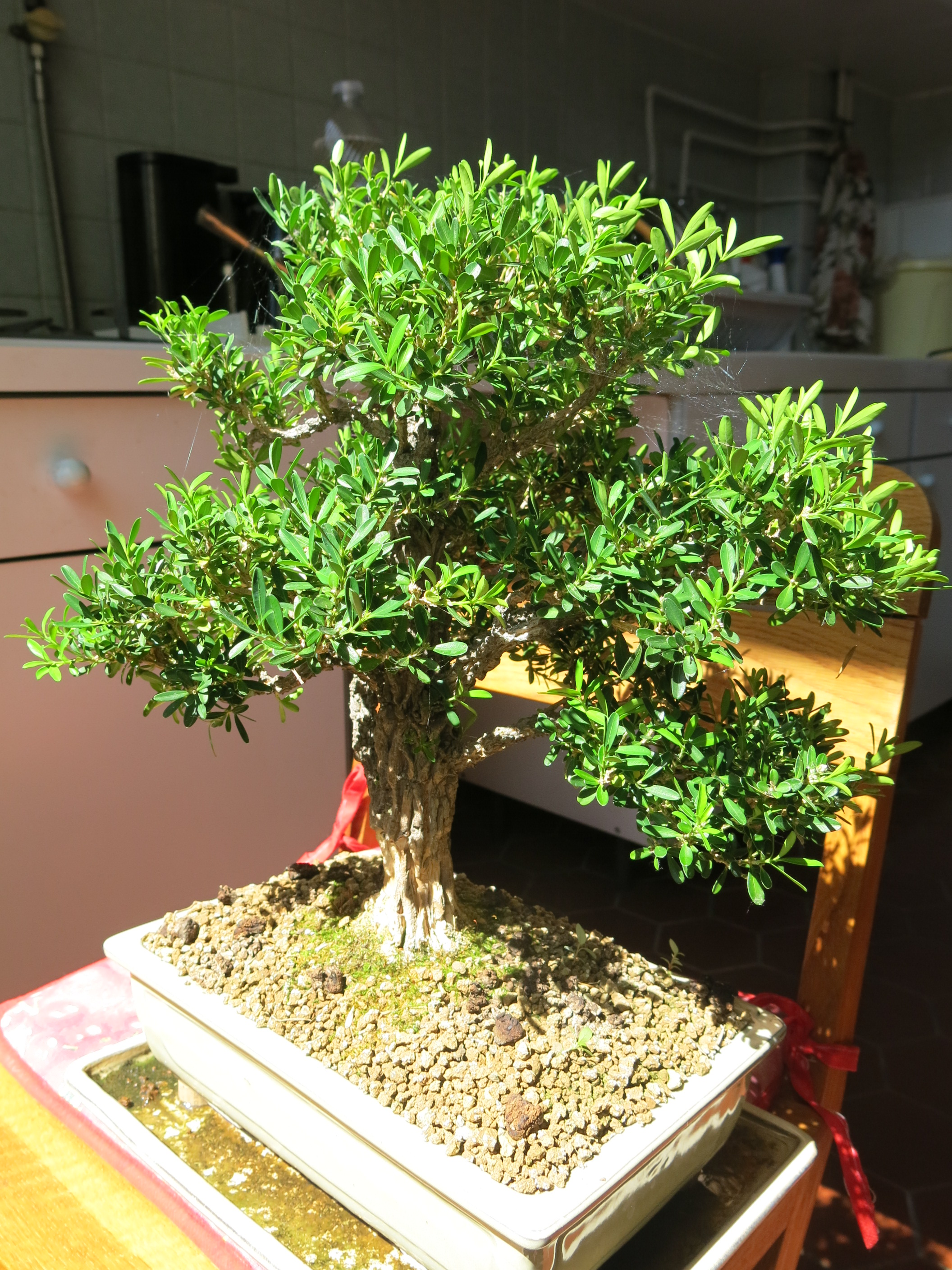
- Buxus harlandii is often used for bonsai
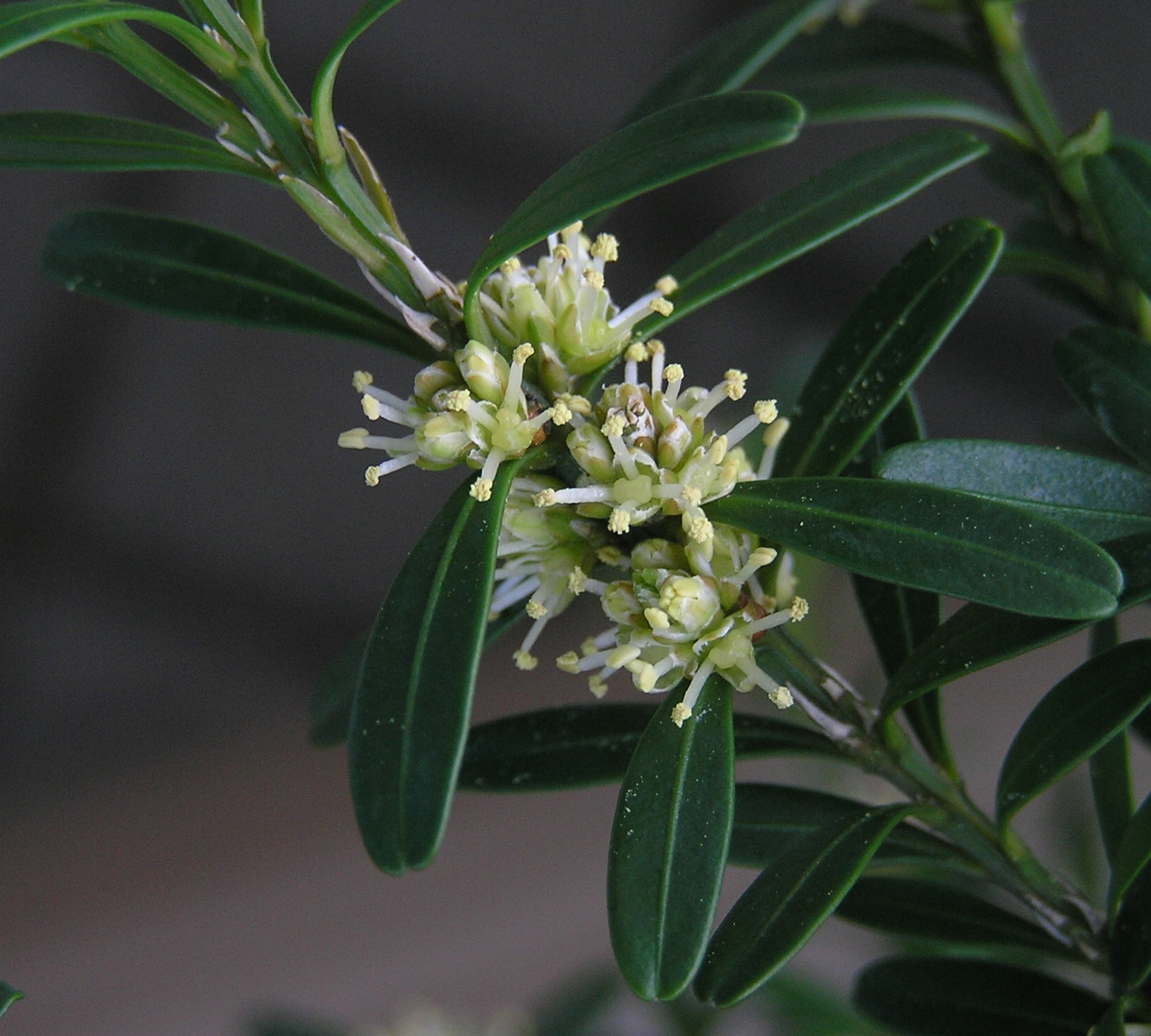
- Close-up of flowers

Scientific classification
- Kingdom: Plantae
- Clade: Embryophytes
- Clade: Tracheophytes
- Clade: Spermatophytes
- Clade: Angiosperms
- Clade: Eudicots
- Order: Buxales
- Family: Buxaceae
- Genus: Buxus
- Species: B. harlandii

Binomial name
- Buxus harlandii Hance

= Buxus harlandii =

Species of flowering plant

Buxus harlandii, the Harland boxwood, is a species of flowering plant in the family Buxaceae. It is native to coastal southeast China, from Hong Kong and other Guangdong islands down to Hainan, and to Vietnam. Care must be taken when purchasing, as many specimens labeled Buxus harlandii are actually Buxus microphylla.
