= Buxus arborea =

Conservation status
- Vulnerable (IUCN 3.1)

Scientific classification
- Kingdom: Plantae
- Clade: Tracheophytes
- Clade: Angiosperms
- Clade: Eudicots
- Order: Buxales
- Family: Buxaceae
- Genus: Buxus
- Species: B. arborea

Binomial name
- Buxus arborea Proctor

Species of plant

Buxus arborea is a species of plant in the family Buxaceae. It is endemic to Jamaica. It is threatened by habitat loss.

== Description ==
Buxus arborea is a dicot plant, growing as shrubs or trees up to 2-12 meters tall, producing wood. Buxus arborea has compound leaves. The leaves are typically alternate on stems. Its fruits are very small capsules, 0.5 cm-1.5 cm wide, containing tiny seeds that are eaten by birds.

== Uses ==
Buxus Arborea can be used for wood carving, and for hedge structures.

== Distribution ==
Buxus Arborea is distributed in the United States (NY, OH, NC, TN, VA).

== Toxicity ==
May cause skin rash, vomiting, or diarrhea if exposed to the leaves.

== Cultivation ==
Buxus Arborea typically like to grow in the outdoors. They grow in warm temperatures predominately.
