= Buxus nyasica =

Conservation status
- Endangered (IUCN 3.1)

Scientific classification
- Kingdom: Plantae
- Clade: Tracheophytes
- Clade: Angiosperms
- Clade: Eudicots
- Order: Buxales
- Family: Buxaceae
- Genus: Buxus
- Species: B. nyasica

Binomial name
- Buxus nyasica Hutch.

Synonyms
- Notobuxus nyasica (Hutch.) E.Phillips

Species of flowering plant

Buxus nyasica is a species of plant in the family Buxaceae. It is endemic to Malawi. It is threatened by habitat loss.
