= Buxus obtusifolia =

Conservation status
- Vulnerable (IUCN 3.1)

Scientific classification
- Kingdom: Plantae
- Clade: Embryophytes
- Clade: Tracheophytes
- Clade: Angiosperms
- Clade: Eudicots
- Order: Buxales
- Family: Buxaceae
- Genus: Buxus
- Species: B. obtusifolia

Binomial name
- Buxus obtusifolia (Mildbr.) Hutch.

Synonyms
- Homotypic Synonyms: Notobuxus obtusifolius Mildbr.

Species of flowering plant

Buxus obtusifolia is a species of flowering plant in the family Buxaceae. It is found in Kenya and Tanzania.

Buxus obtusifolia is usually restricted to small dry wooded bush land areas extending from southeast Kenya to southeast Tanzania. Out of the three concluded pollen types, B. obtusifolia is categorized as a notobuxus type because of its "predominantly sculptured reticulate exine" as well as its zonocolporate grains.

The genus Buxus has about 70 species of evergreen shrubs and trees found in habitats ranging from rocky hills to woodlands. The general characteristics of Buxus are small simple leaves, entire or toothed, alternately arranged or opposite on the stems. The wood is very firm and close grained, and is used for wood engraving and musical instruments. It has a yellowish color, very rarely splits, and has a good natural polish.

Buxus obtusifolia is sometimes known as hutch. Buxus refers to the box or hardwood that can be obtained from the bark of Buxaceae plants. The family Buxaceae ranges from regions in Europe, Africa, Asia, Central America to the Caribbean. Buxaceae plants are perennial, living for more than two years before they die. Buxus plants consists of two categories; Eubuxus found mainly in Africa, Asia, and Europe and Tricera which reside in the Caribbean. B. obtusifolia is approximately six meters tall. It has small and simple leaves with an oval shape.
