= Metre-stick =

Straightedge or folding ruler used to physically measure lengths

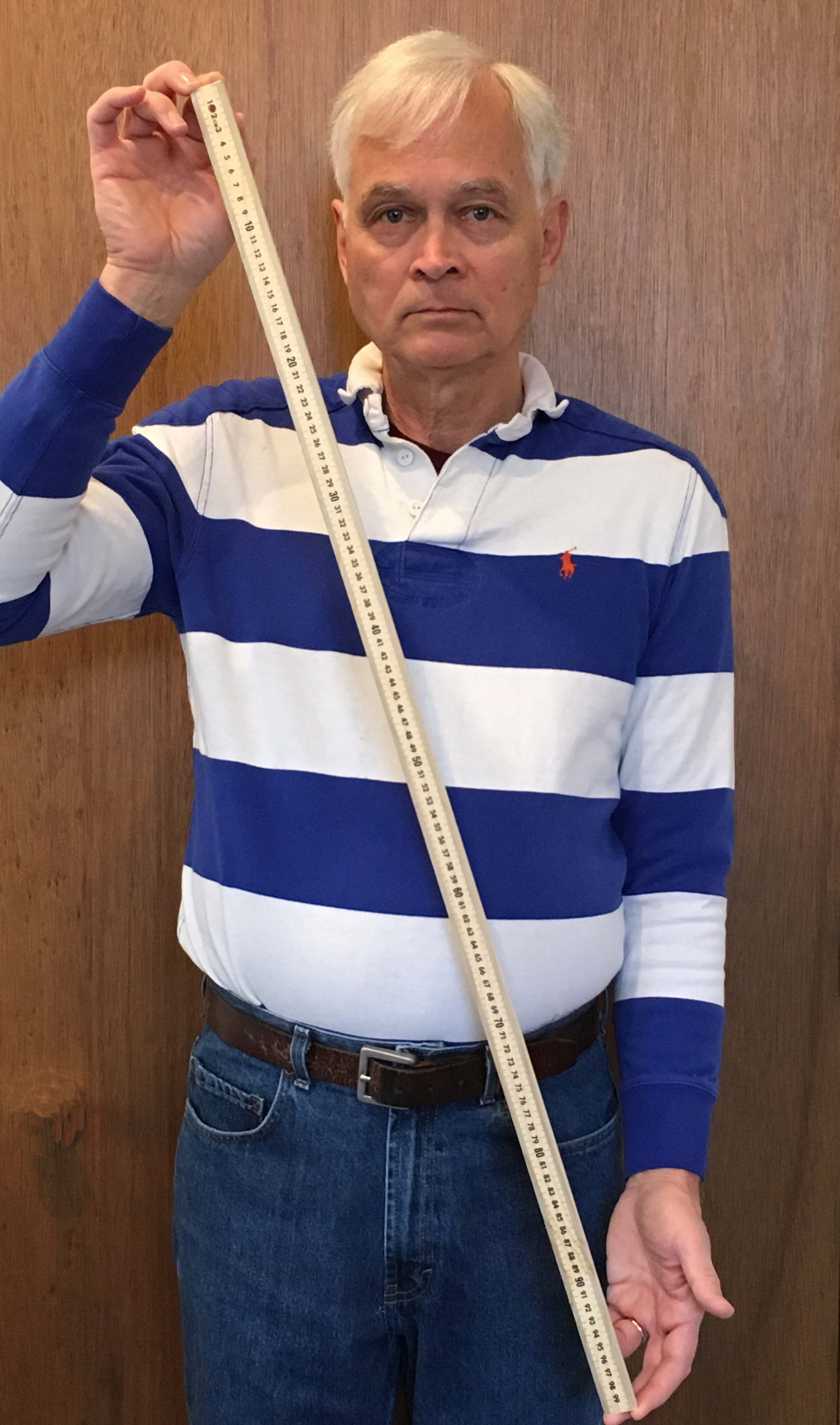
A metrestick divided into 1,000 mm and labeled with 100 cm

A metre-stick, metrestick (or meter-stick and meterstick as alternative spellings); or yardstick is either a straightedge or foldable ruler used to measure length, and is especially common in the construction industry. They are often made of wood or plastic, and often have metal or plastic joints so that they can be folded together. The normal length of a metre-stick made for the international market is either one or two metres, while a yardstick made for the U.S. market is typically one yard (3 feet or 0.9144 metres) long.

Metre-sticks are usually divided with lines for each millimetre (1000 per metre) and numerical markings per centimetre (100 per metre), with numbers either in centimetres or millimetres. Yardsticks are most often marked with a scale in inches, but sometimes also feature marks for foot increments. Hybrid sticks with more than one measurement system also exist, most notably those which have metric measurements on one side and U.S. customary units on the other side (or both on the same side). The "tumstock" (literally "thumbstick", meaning "inch-stick") invented in 1883 by the Swedish engineer Karl-Hilmer Johansson Kollén was the first such hybrid stick, and was developed to help Sweden convert to the metric system.

== Construction ==
Metre-sticks are often thin and rectangular, and made of wood or metal. Metal ones are often backed with 'grippy' material, such as cork, to improve friction. They are relatively cheap, with most wood models costing under US$5.

== Measurements ==
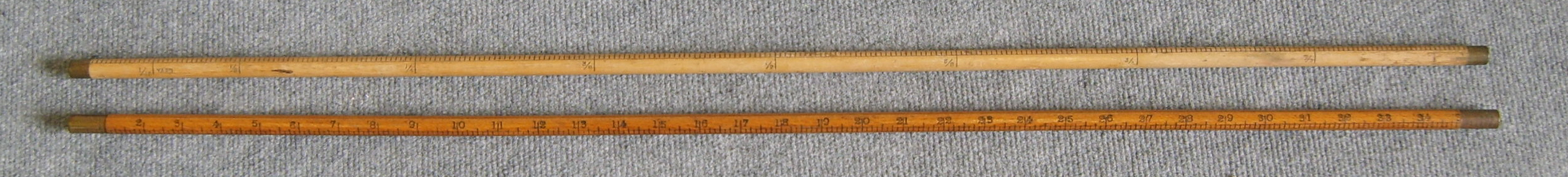
Two wooden yardsticks with brass ends, in inches and division of yard for half, quarter, eighth and sixteenth

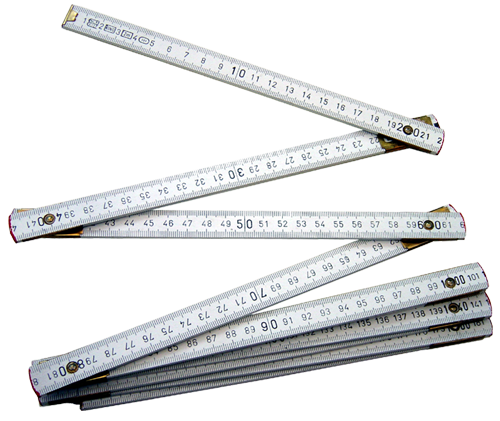
A folding metre-stick carpenter's ruler with millimetre divisions and numbers in centimetres. Fully extended it measures 2 metres.

In countries in which the metric system is used, the scale typically contains only a metric scale. The scale marks every millimetre with every 5th millimetre marked by a slightly longer line. Every centimetre is marked with an even longer line and a numeric label. Every decimetre is usually predominantly marked. They might be referred to as yardsticks, metre-sticks or "inch sticks". In the United States, the marking is usually in customary units (three feet 3 3/8 inches with inch and fractional inch). Hybrid measures bearing customary markings on one side and metric units on the other also exist and are sometimes referred to as yardsticks, metre-whesticks or "metre rulers". The spelling meter vs metre varies by country, though metre is the official and most widely used spelling in English-speaking countries.

Although not used as often, metre-sticks with only a metric scale can be found in the United States. For example, they are common in schools where there is a desire for students to become familiar with metric units, since the nineteenth century. They may also be used in American science labs.

The folding carpenters' rulers used in Scandinavia are sometimes equipped with double measurements, metric and imperial on both sides, also functioning as a handy conversion table, accounting for its Scandinavian term: Tommestokk/tumstock (thumb (inch) stick), a term with the same meaning that is also used in Dutch: duimstok. Metric only carpenter's rulers are however common.

== Application ==
The metre-stick is usually employed for work on a medium scale; larger than desktop work on paper, yet smaller than large-scale infrastructure work, where tape measures or longer measuring rods are used. Typical applications of metre-sticks are for building furniture, vehicles and houses. Modern carpenters' metre-sticks are usually made to be folded for ease of transport.

Metre-sticks may be used as pointing devices for posters and projections. Metre-sticks are also used as spars to make wings for remote-controlled model aircraft that are made from corrugated plastic.

Metre-sticks have been used by educators as a method of corporal punishment in schools in the United Kingdom to slap the palms of students to bring them in order.

== See also ==
=== Metaphorical uses ===
- Benchmarking
- Canon (basic principle)
- Litmus test (disambiguation)
- Portsmouth Yardstick
- Standardization

=== Physical uses ===
- Ruler
- Scale rule
- Tape measure
