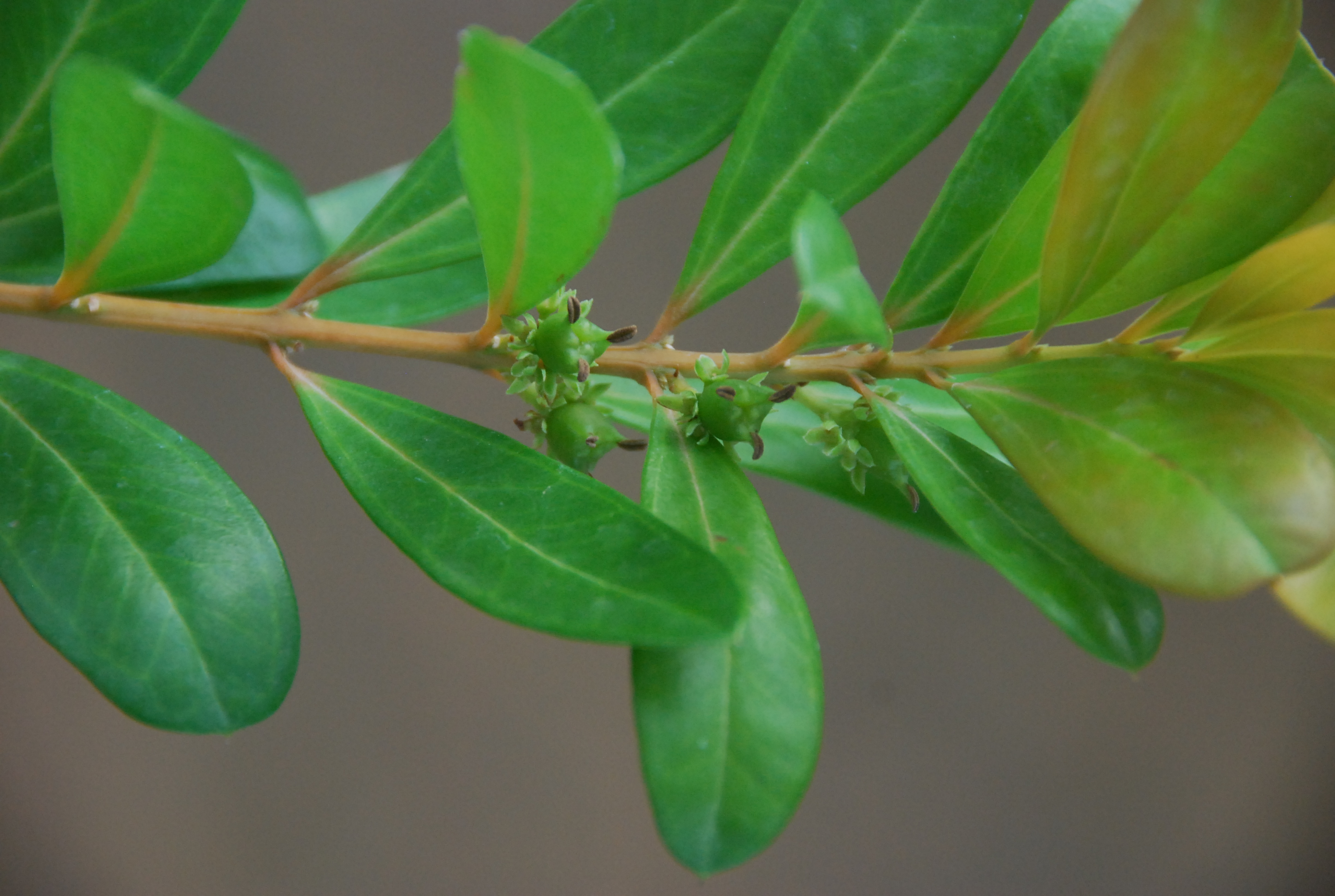

Conservation status
- Endangered (IUCN 3.1)

Scientific classification
- Kingdom: Plantae
- Clade: Tracheophytes
- Clade: Angiosperms
- Clade: Eudicots
- Order: Buxales
- Family: Buxaceae
- Genus: Buxus
- Species: B. vahlii

Binomial name
- Buxus vahlii Baill.

= Buxus vahlii =

Species of plant

Buxus vahlii, or Vahl's boxwood, is a rare species of plant in the boxwood family. It is native to Puerto Rico and St. Croix in the U.S. Virgin Islands, where it is known from no more than four populations in total. It has probably never been very common, but its distribution has been reduced by deforestation and other human disturbance of its habitat. At the time it was listed as an endangered species of the United States in 1985, it was thought to be endemic to Puerto Rico. Reports that it existed in Jamaica have not been confirmed. A few individuals have been located in St. Croix, some of which are within Sandy Point National Wildlife Refuge.

This is a shrub or small tree which can reach 5 meters in height. The stem has two grooves below each node, an identifying characteristic. Clusters of flowers yield fruits which are horned capsules containing black seeds.

The two populations remaining in Puerto Rico total 40 to 85 individuals, none of which have been observed to successfully reproduce. One population is located in Rincón near the beach at Punta Higuero. The plants there are short in stature and chlorotic, possibly from exposure to sun, sea spray, and high winds. The plants are located in a canyon next to a popular surfing and camping beach which has experienced accidental fires. The other population is in a forest near Hato Tejas in Bayamón.

The plant grows on limestone substrates. Quarrying of limestone threatens this type of habitat on Puerto Rico, and the smaller population is located next to a quarry.
