= Acid test (disambiguation) =

Acid test is a qualitative chemical or metallurgical assay which uses acid, or figuratively a definitive test for some attribute, e.g. of a person's character, or of the performance of a product.

Acid test or acid tests may also refer to:

== Science and computing ==
- Acid1, Acid2 and Acid3, test suites for web browsers
- the use of hydrochloric acid to test rock or soil for carbonates within a petrocalcic horizon
- In the classification of a rock's lithology, dilute hydrochloric acid may be used to detect the presence of carbonate minerals

== Arts, entertainment and media ==
- Acid Test (band), a Canadian alternative rock band
- ACID TEST, a John Lennon tribute band of Kazutoshi Sakurai
- "Acid Test", a song by Emma Pollock from the 2007 album Watch the Fireworks
- "The Acid Test", a Radio Five Live programme 1994–97 by Kate Bellingham

== Other uses ==
- Quick ratio, or acid-test ratio, a type of financial liquidity ratio
- Acid Tests, parties in San Francisco in the mid-1960s centered on use of the drug LSD

== See also ==
- Acid (disambiguation)
- Litmus test (disambiguation)
- ACID (atomicity, consistency, isolation, durability), set of properties of database transactions
