= Buxus natalensis =

Conservation status
- Least Concern (IUCN 3.1)

Scientific classification
- Kingdom: Plantae
- Clade: Tracheophytes
- Clade: Angiosperms
- Clade: Eudicots
- Order: Buxales
- Family: Buxaceae
- Genus: Buxus
- Species: B. natalensis

Binomial name
- Buxus natalensis (Oliv.) Hutch.

Synonyms
- Notobuxus natalensis Oliv.

Species of plant

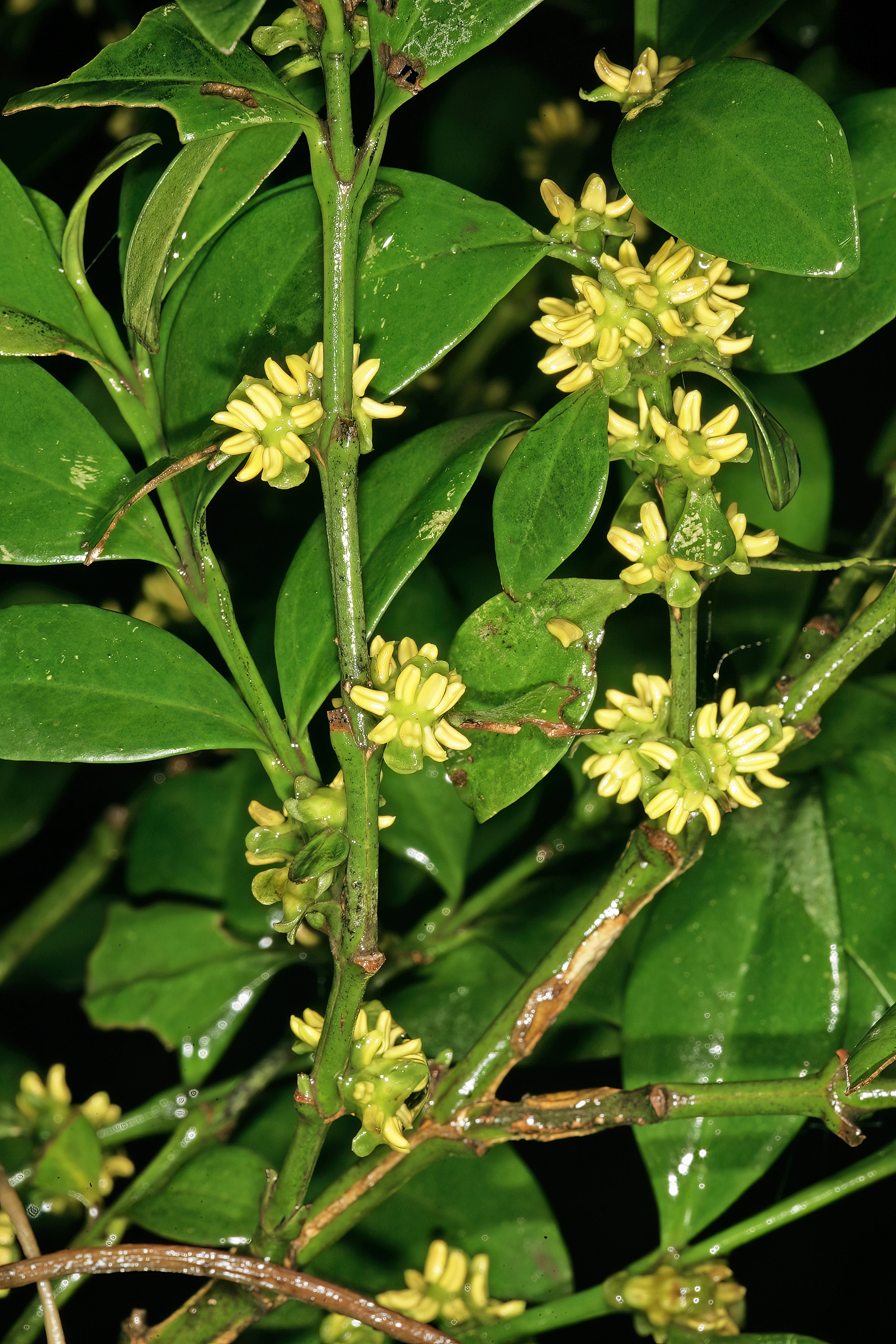
B. natalensis

Buxus natalensis, the box wattle, is a species of flowering plant in the family Buxaceae, native to KwaZulu-Natal in South Africa. There appears to be a cultivar, 'New Silver'.
