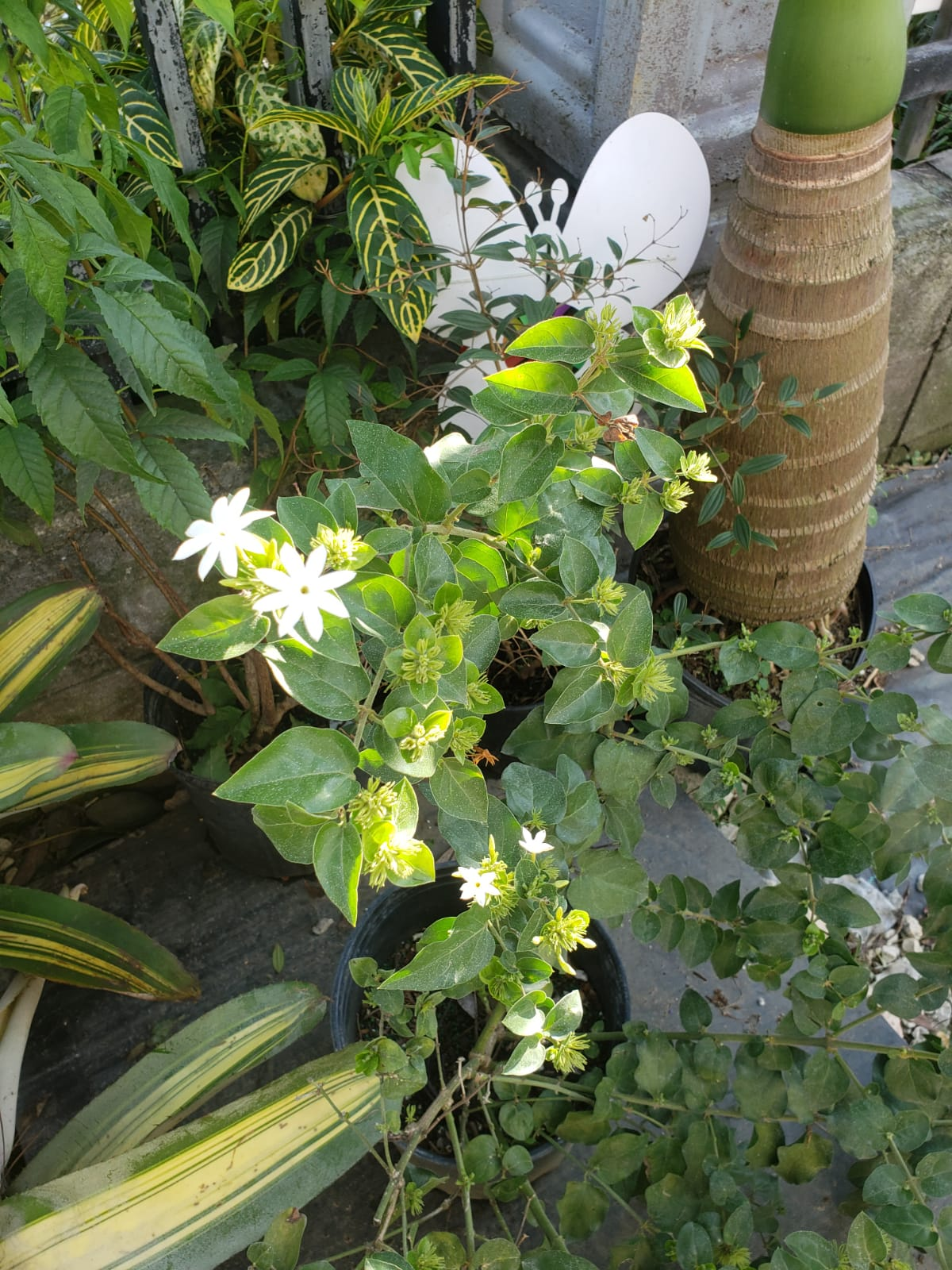

Conservation status
- Least Concern (IUCN 3.1)

Scientific classification
- Kingdom: Plantae
- Clade: Tracheophytes
- Clade: Angiosperms
- Clade: Eudicots
- Order: Buxales
- Family: Buxaceae
- Genus: Buxus
- Species: B. citrifolia

Binomial name
- Buxus citrifolia (Willd.) Spreng.

Synonyms
- Tricera citrifolia Willd.

= Buxus citrifolia =

Species of flowering plant

Buxus citrifolia is a species of flowering plant in the family Buxaceae. It is a large shrub or small tree native to Colombia, Panama, Suriname, and Venezuela. It grows in lowland tropical dry forest up to 1,000 metres elevation.

The hermaphrodite shrub, having both the male and female reproductive organs in the same individual, is 3–5 m tall with a 5 cm diameter at breast height. Twigs are free from hair and somewhat tetragonal, while the angle ridges are prominent. The leaves are elliptic to narrowly elliptic-ovate while being wedge-shaped or round at the base. The leaves are 5–12 cm long, 2–5 cm wide having the sub-3-veined from the base with the outer 2 nerves forming submarginal veins. The petiole margined and 2–5 mm long.

The complete flower head of a plant including stems, stalks, bracts, and flowers, inflorescence, is short only about 1–2 cm long axillary. Cymose, definite inflorescence, with a single terminal female flower and several lateral male flowers. The bract, modified leaf, is triangular and 1–2 mm long. Pedicels of male flowers 2–4 mm long, the female flowers sessile. Flowers are white and fragrant.

Buxus citrifolia has been considered similar to another species in the family Buxaceae – Buxus laevigata. B. laevigata – native to Jamaica – differs from B. citrifolia in having smaller fruits and flowers. When comparing them to B. citrifolia, the elliptic leaves are broader and has more pronounced secondary venation and more marginal lateral veins. The Martinique plant has also often been confused with B. citrifolia, however, the Martinique plant has been found to have long capsule horns and bigger flowers than B. citrifolia.

The species was first described as Tricera citrifolia by Carl Ludwig Willdenow in 1805. In 1826 Kurt Polycarp Joachim Sprengel placed the species in genus Buxus as B. citrifolia.
