= Litmus test =

Litmus test may refer to:

- Litmus test (chemistry), used to determine the acidity of a chemical solution
- Litmus test (politics), a question that seeks to find the character of a potential candidate by measuring a single indicator
- The Litmus Test, a Radio 4 programme presented by Fred Harris
- The Litmus Test, a 2004 album by Cut Chemist

== See also ==
- Acid test (disambiguation)
- Litmus Test of Medjugorje, the Catholic Church response to the Medjugorje apparitions
- Litmus milk, used to distinguish between different species of bacteria
