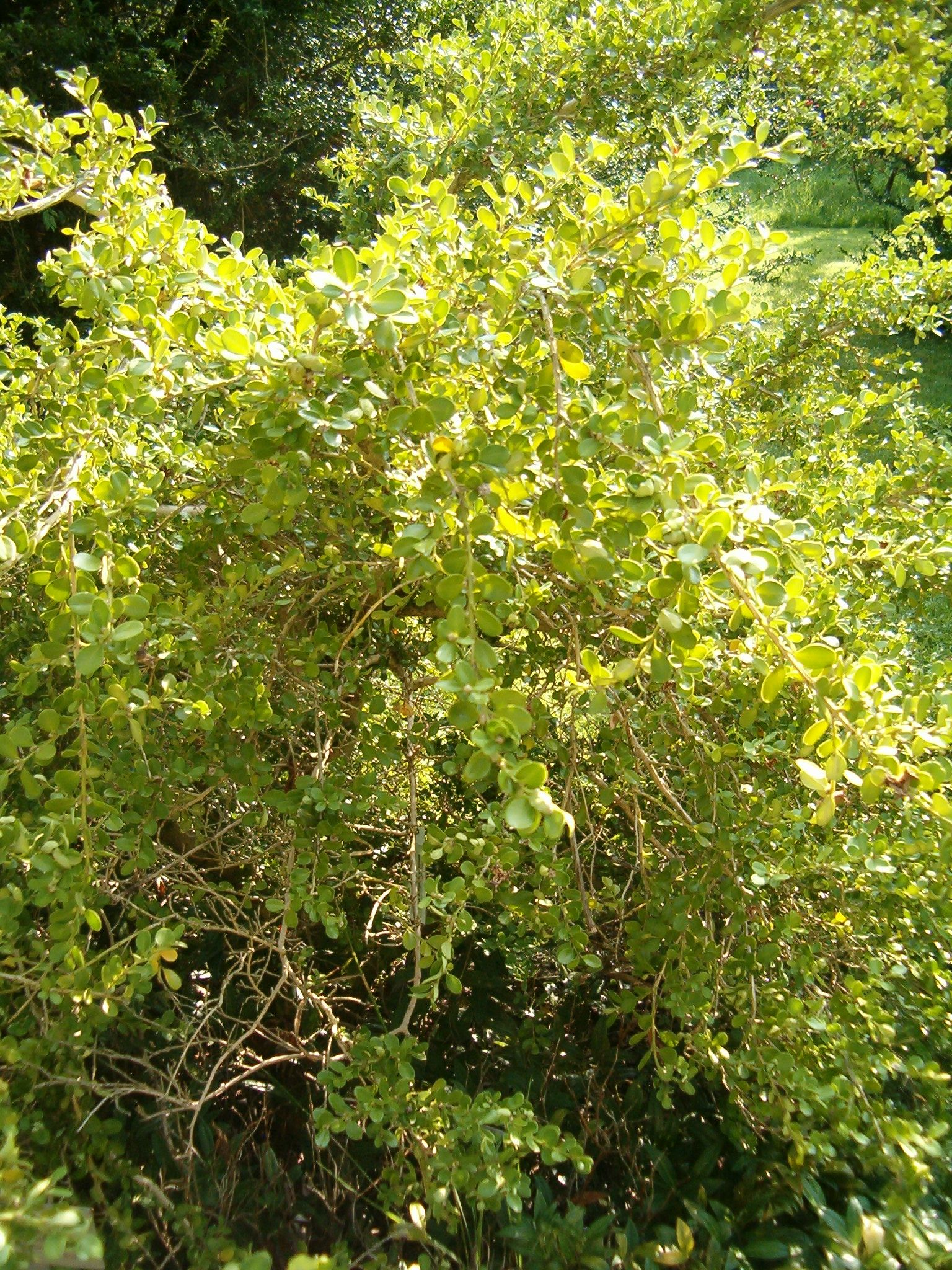

Conservation status
- Least Concern (IUCN 3.1)

Scientific classification
- Kingdom: Plantae
- Clade: Embryophytes
- Clade: Tracheophytes
- Clade: Angiosperms
- Clade: Eudicots
- Order: Buxales
- Family: Buxaceae
- Genus: Buxus
- Species: B. microphylla

Binomial name
- Buxus microphylla Siebold & Zucc.

= Buxus microphylla =

Species of flowering plant

Buxus microphylla, the Japanese box or littleleaf box, is a species of flowering plant in the box family found in Japan and Taiwan. It is a dwarf evergreen shrub or small tree growing to 1 m (3.3 ft) tall and wide.

== Description ==
In the case of Buxus microphylla var. japonica, the tree height is usually 1–3 m, but it can reach up to about 4 m; in rare cases it grows to 10 m. The trunk is upright and about 10 cm thick, and the bark is grayish white to pale brown.

The bright green leaves are 10–25 millimetres (0.39–0.98 in) long, oval with a rounded or notched tip. The species was first described from Japanese cultivated plants of an unknown origin. They are unknown in the wild.

== Taxonomy ==
The scientific name for Japanese box is Buxus microphylla var. japonica. Plants from Taiwan are distinguished as Buxus microphylla var. tarokoensis S.Y.Lu & Yuen P.Yang. Plants from China and Korea, formerly often cited as Buxus microphylla var. sinica, are now treated as a distinct species Buxus sinica.

== Uses ==
The species is grown as an ornamental plant, both in its native area and elsewhere in temperate regions around the world. It is particularly suitable for topiary or low hedging. Buxus microphylla var. compacta (Kingsville dwarf boxwood) and similar cultivars are frequently used for bonsai.

The cultivar 'Faulkner' (1 metre (3.3 ft) tall by 1.5 metres (4.9 ft) broad) has gained the Royal Horticultural Society's Award of Garden Merit.

In Japan, the wood of Buxus microphylla var. japonica can be used to make a hanko (seal).

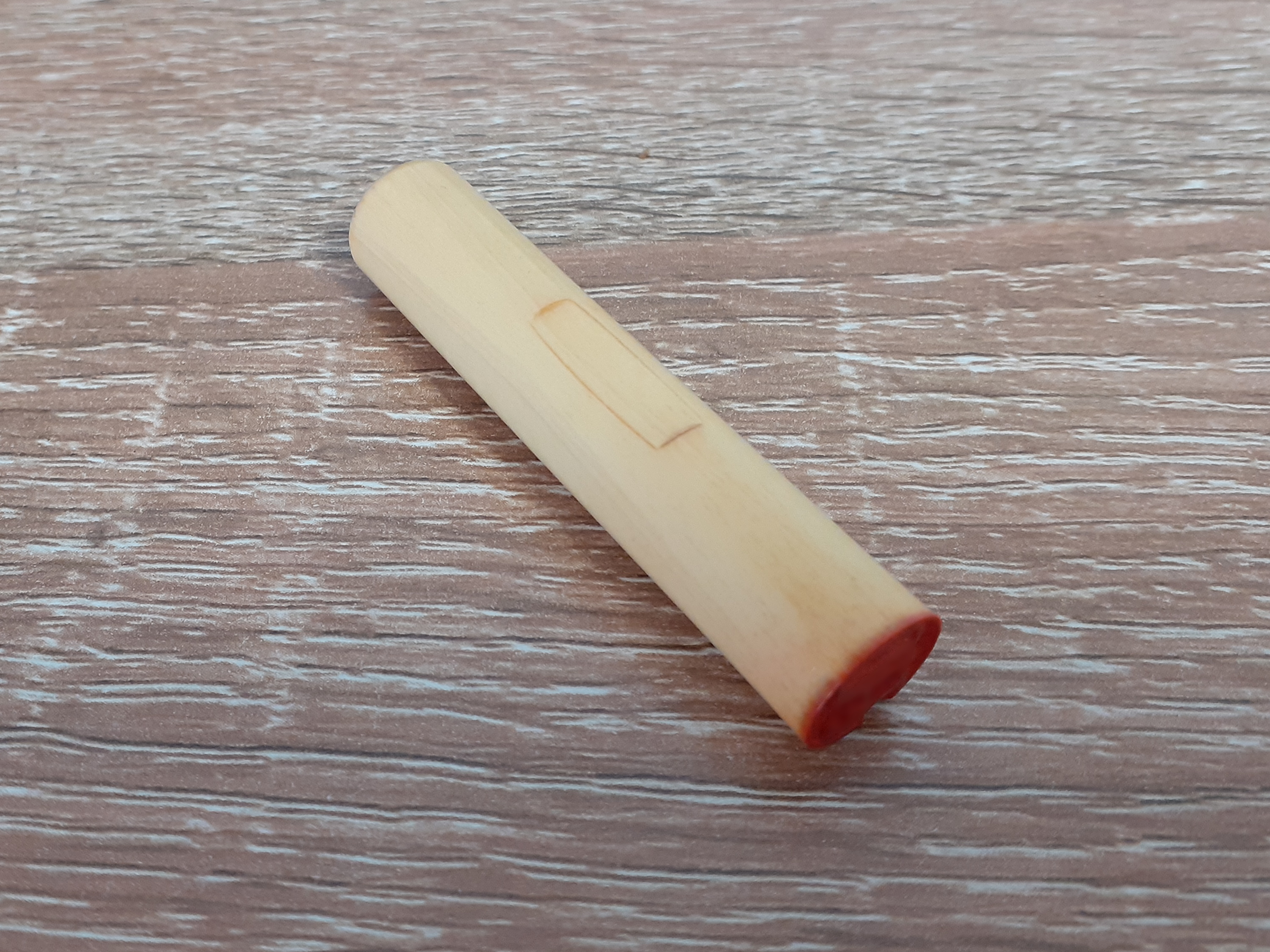
Hanko made of Japanese box
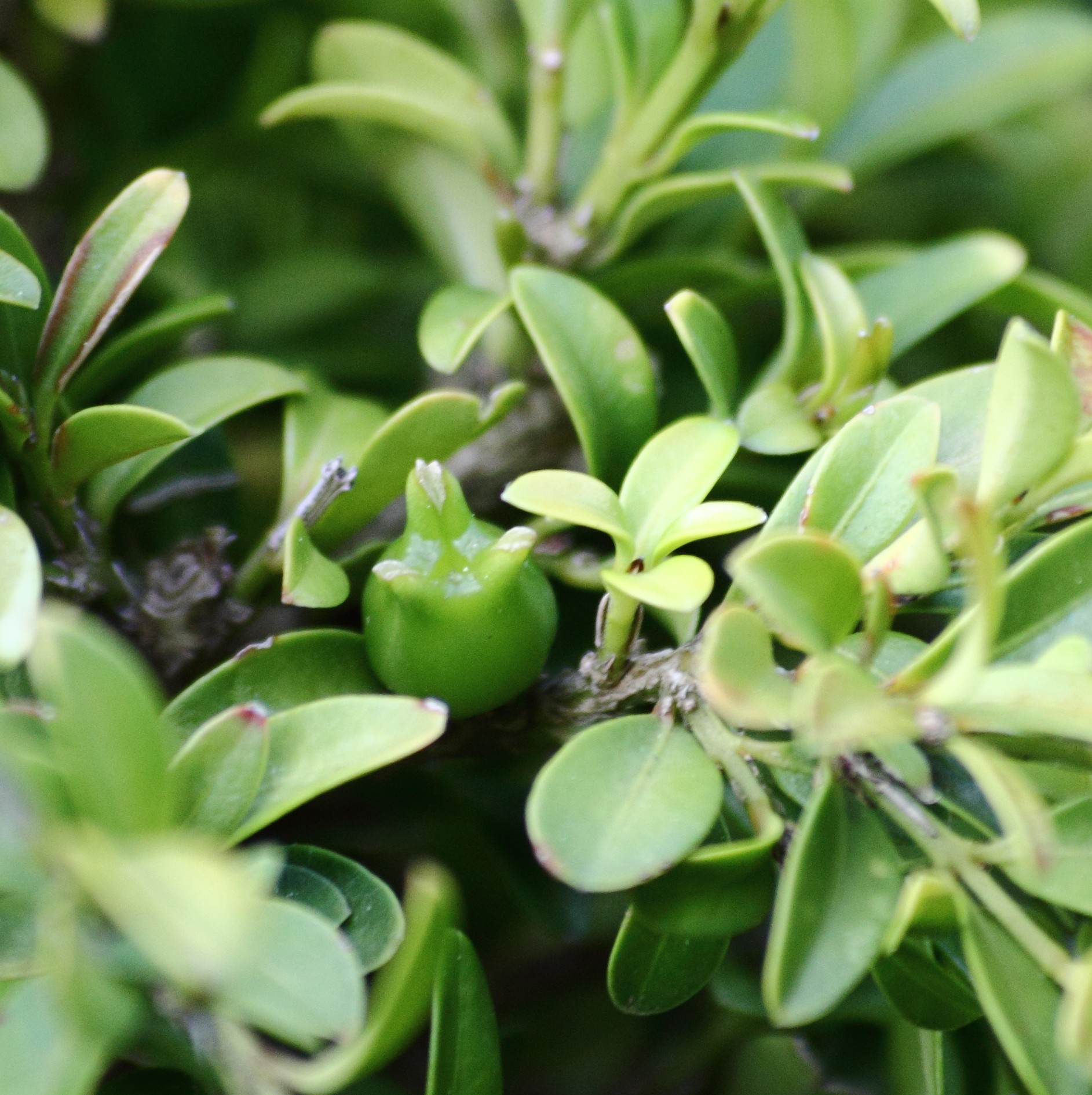
Fruit and foliage of a dwarf variety of Buxus microphylla ('Hohman's Dwarf')

== Root, Stem, and Stomata Under the Microscope ==
Buxus microphylla contains an outermost cork cambium. This secondary growth is shown on both the stems and the roots leading a phellogen (cork cambium) to develop.

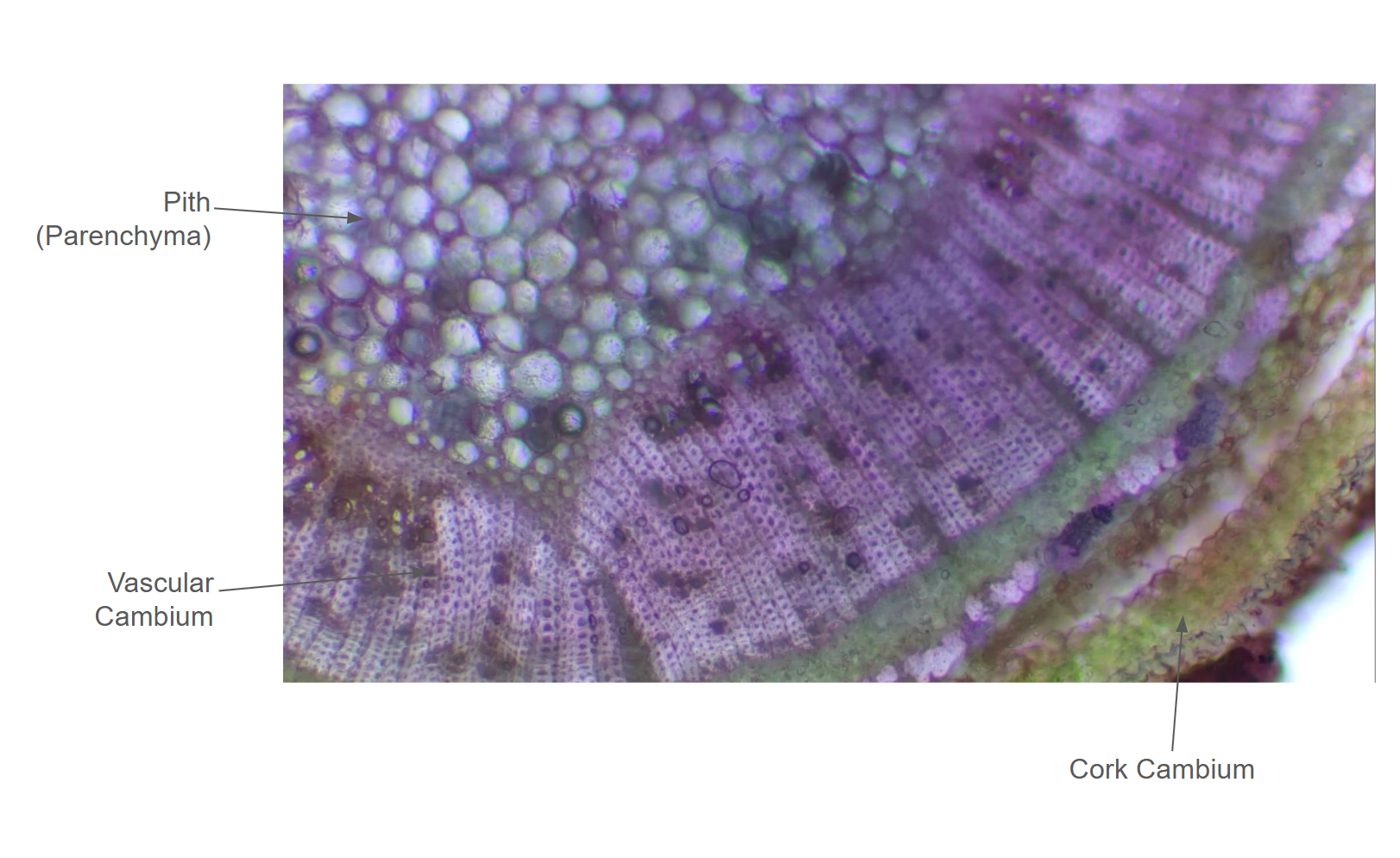
Stem Cross Section of Buxus microphylla

The stem cross section displays a typical dicot stem. The vascular cambium is present and displayed in rings with the phloem being closer to the cork cambium and the xylem being on the inner side. The pith in the center is present.

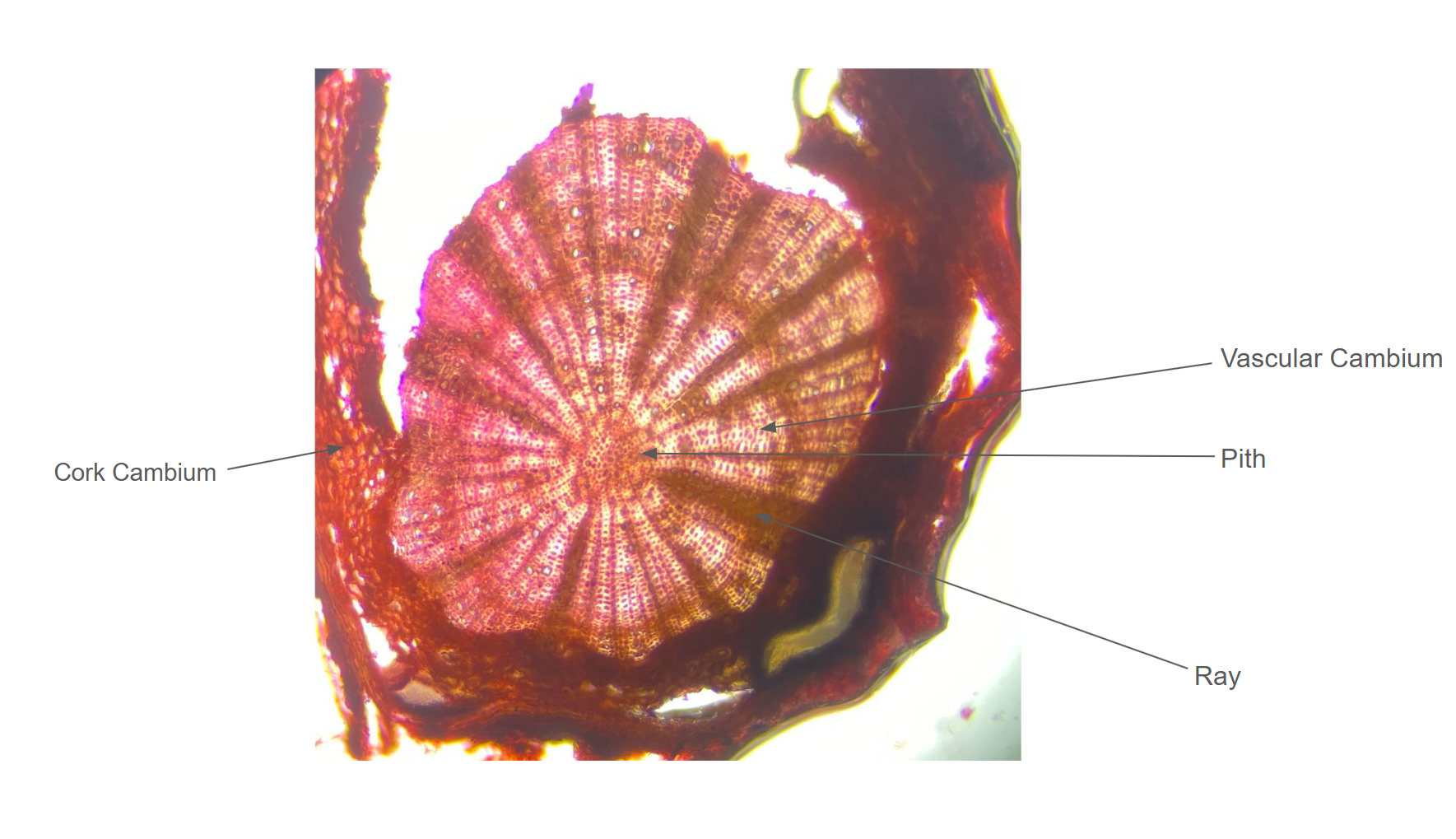
Root Cross Section of Buxus microphylla

The root cross section displays a typical root of a woody dicot. The phellogen (cork cambium) of this root is slightly detached from the top of the image, this does not represent typical behavior of the root as it is a secondary growth characteristic of the plant and is developed from lateral meristems throughout the plant. This plant has a fibrous root system meaning that the roots of this plant are all similar in diameter and originate from the stems.

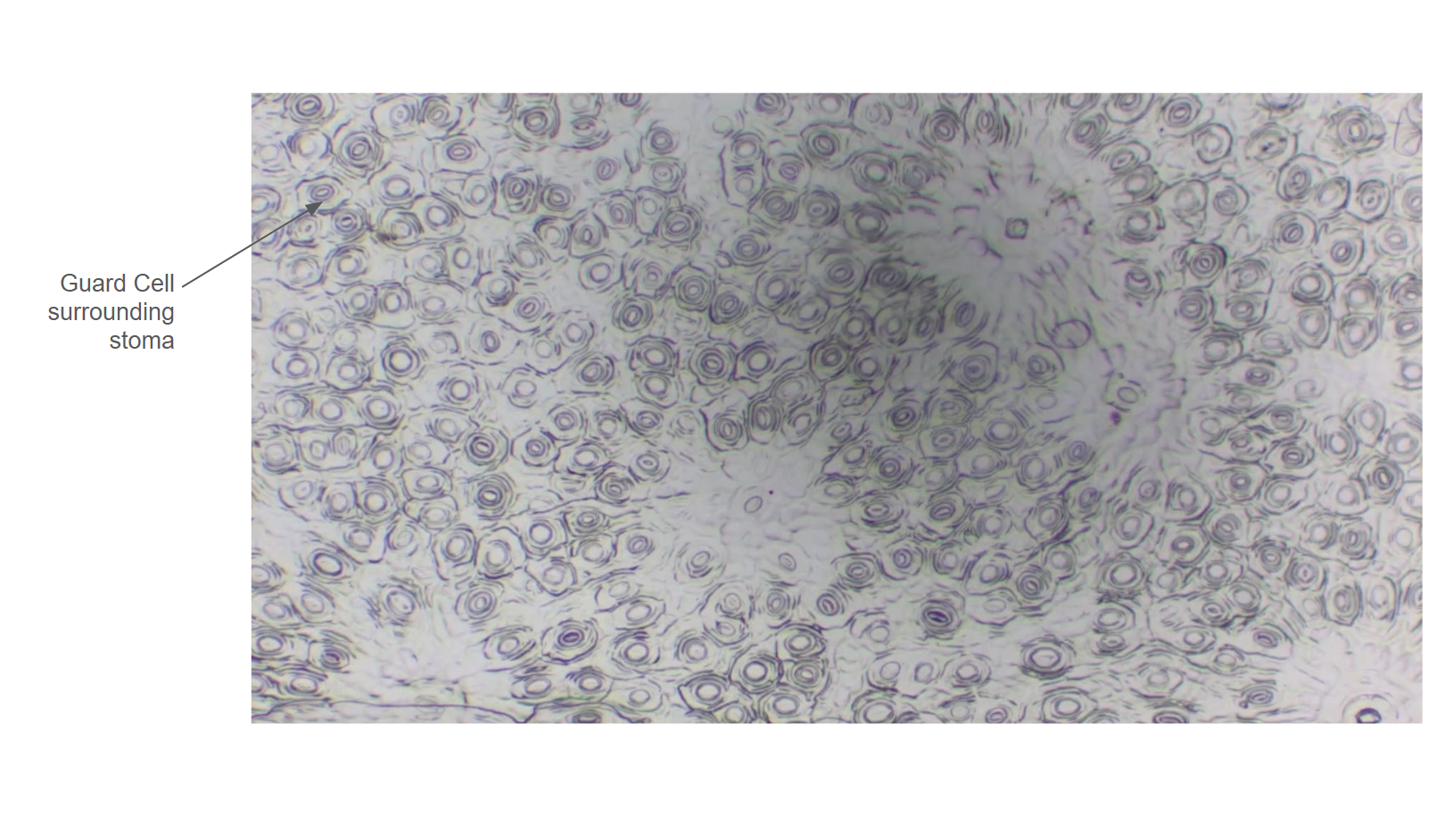
Stomata from the underside of a leaf of Buxus microphylla
