= Acid attack (disambiguation) =

Acid attack usually refers to acid throwing, a form of violent assault.

Acid attack may also refer to:

- Acid erosion to teeth, caused by bacterial acid; see also tooth decay
- Harmful effects of acidic soils to aquatic ecosystems and concrete infrastructure
