= Acid (computer virus) =

Computer virus infecting .COM and .EXE files

Malware details
- Technical name: Acid.674
- Aliases: Acid-670, Acid.670, Acid.670a, Avatar.Acid.670, Keeper.Acid.670
- Type: DOS
- Subtype: COM and EXE infector
- Classification: Virus
- Family: N/A
- Isolation date: 1992
- Origin: Unknown
- Author: Copyfright Corp-$MZU

Acid is a computer virus which infects .COM and .EXE files including command.com. Each time an infected file is executed, Acid infects all of the .EXE files in the current directory. Later, if an infected file is executed, it infects the .COM files in the current directory. Programs infected with Acid will have had the first 792 bytes of the host program overwritten with Acid's own code. There will be no file length increase unless the original host program was smaller than 792 bytes, in which case it will become 792 bytes in length. The program's date and time in the DOS disk directory listing will not be altered.

The following text strings are found in infected files:

- "*.EXE *.COM .."
- "Program too big to fit in memory"
- "Acid Virus"
- "Legalize ACiD and Pot"
- "By: Copyfright Corp-$MZU"
