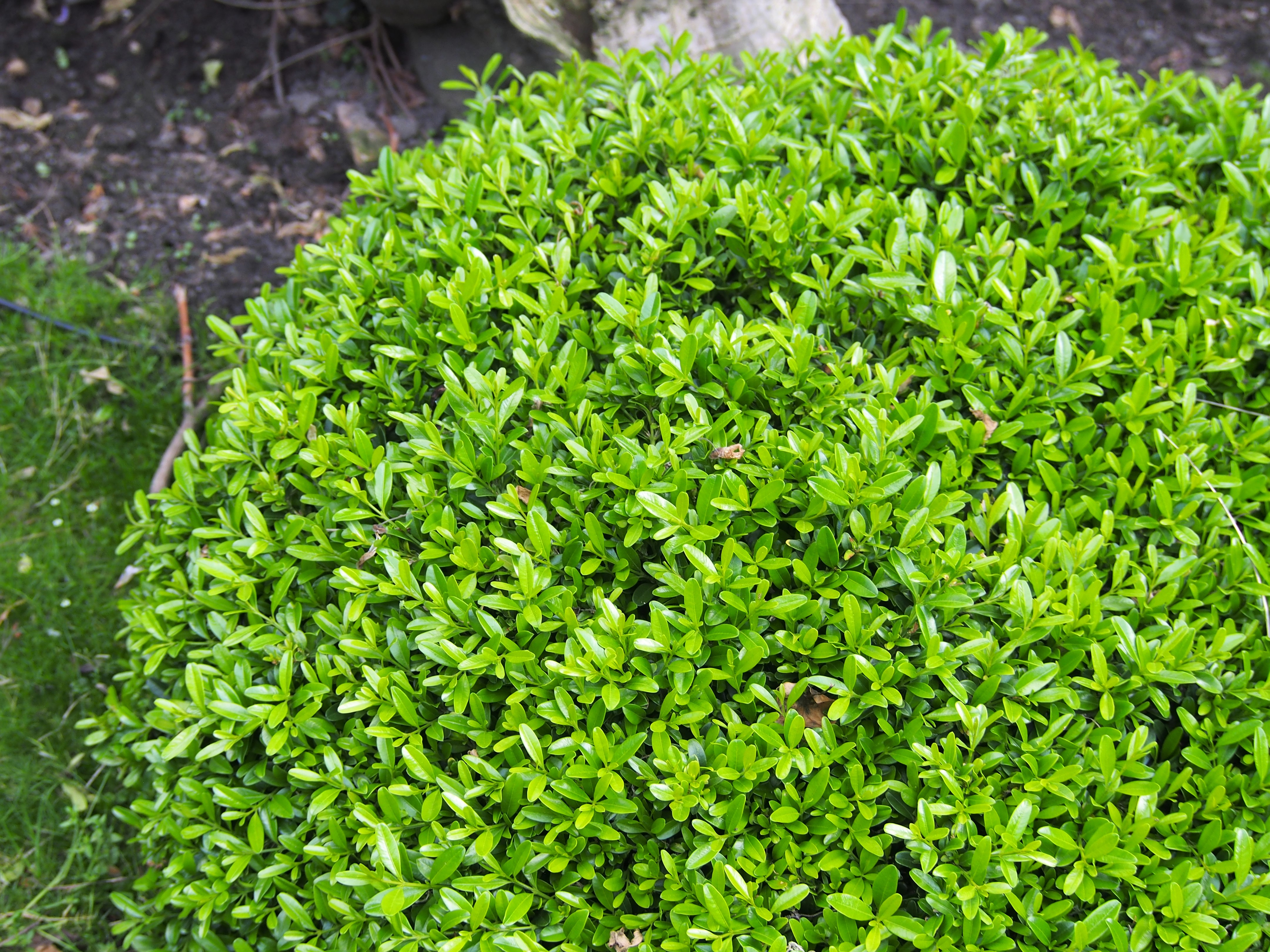
- Buxus sinica var. insularis 'Wintergreen' cultivar, hardy to USDA zone 4
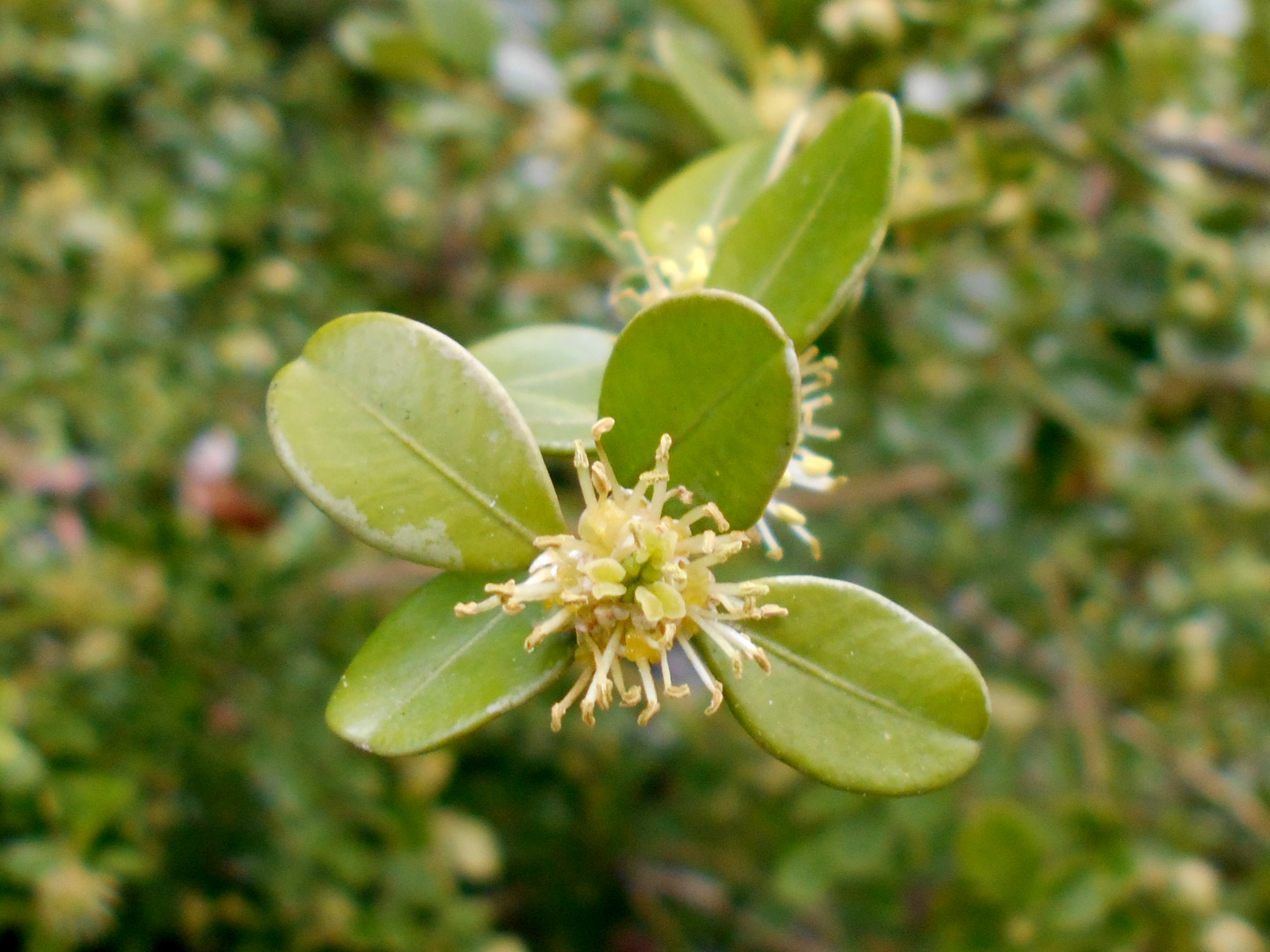
- Close-up of flower

Scientific classification
- Kingdom: Plantae
- Clade: Embryophytes
- Clade: Tracheophytes
- Clade: Spermatophytes
- Clade: Angiosperms
- Clade: Eudicots
- Order: Buxales
- Family: Buxaceae
- Genus: Buxus
- Species: B. sinica

Binomial name
- Buxus sinica (Rehder & E.H.Wilson) M.Cheng

Synonyms
- List: Buxus intermedia Hatus.; Buxus koreana (Nakai ex Rehder) Nakai; Buxus koreana var. elongata Nakai; Buxus koreana f. elongata (Nakai) Y.S.Kim & J.H.Kim; Buxus koreana f. insularis (Nakai) Y.S.Kim & J.H.Kim; Buxus microphylla var. aemulans Rehder & E.H.Wilson; Buxus microphylla var. insularis Nakai; Buxus microphylla var. intermedia (Hatus.) H.L.Li; Buxus microphylla var. kiangsiensis Hu & F.H.Chen; Buxus microphylla var. koreana Nakai ex Rehder; Buxus microphylla f. pubescens S.S.Ying; Buxus microphylla var. sinica Rehder & E.H.Wilson; Buxus microphylla subsp. sinica (Rehder & E.H.Wilson) Hatus.; Buxus microphylla f. tarokoensis (S.Y.Lu & Yuen P.Yang) F.Y.Lu, C.H.Ou, Y.T.Chen, Y.S.Chi, K.C.Lu & Y.H.Tseng; Buxus microphylla var. tarokoensis S.Y.Lu & Yuen P.Yang; Buxus sinica subsp. aemulans (Rehder & E.H.Wilson) M.Cheng; Buxus sinica var. koreana (Nakai ex Rehder) Q.L.Wang

= Buxus sinica =

Species of flowering plant

Buxus sinica, the Chinese box or small-leaved box, is a species of flowering plant in the family Buxaceae, native to central and southern China, Taiwan, South Korea, and Japan. A shrub or small tree, in the wild it is found in a variety of habitats, usually from 600 to 2,600 m (2,000 to 8,500 ft) above sea level.

There are a number of cultivars, all derived from Buxus sinica var. insularis (syn. Buxus koreana), including 'Winter Gem', 'Green Gem', 'Justin Brouwers', 'Wintergreen', 'Chegu', 'Tall Boy', 'Tide Hill', 'Winter Beauty', 'Green Mountain', 'Pincushion', 'Filigree', 'Green Velvet', and 'Sunny‑side'. In addition to its use in hedging, it is used in bonsai.

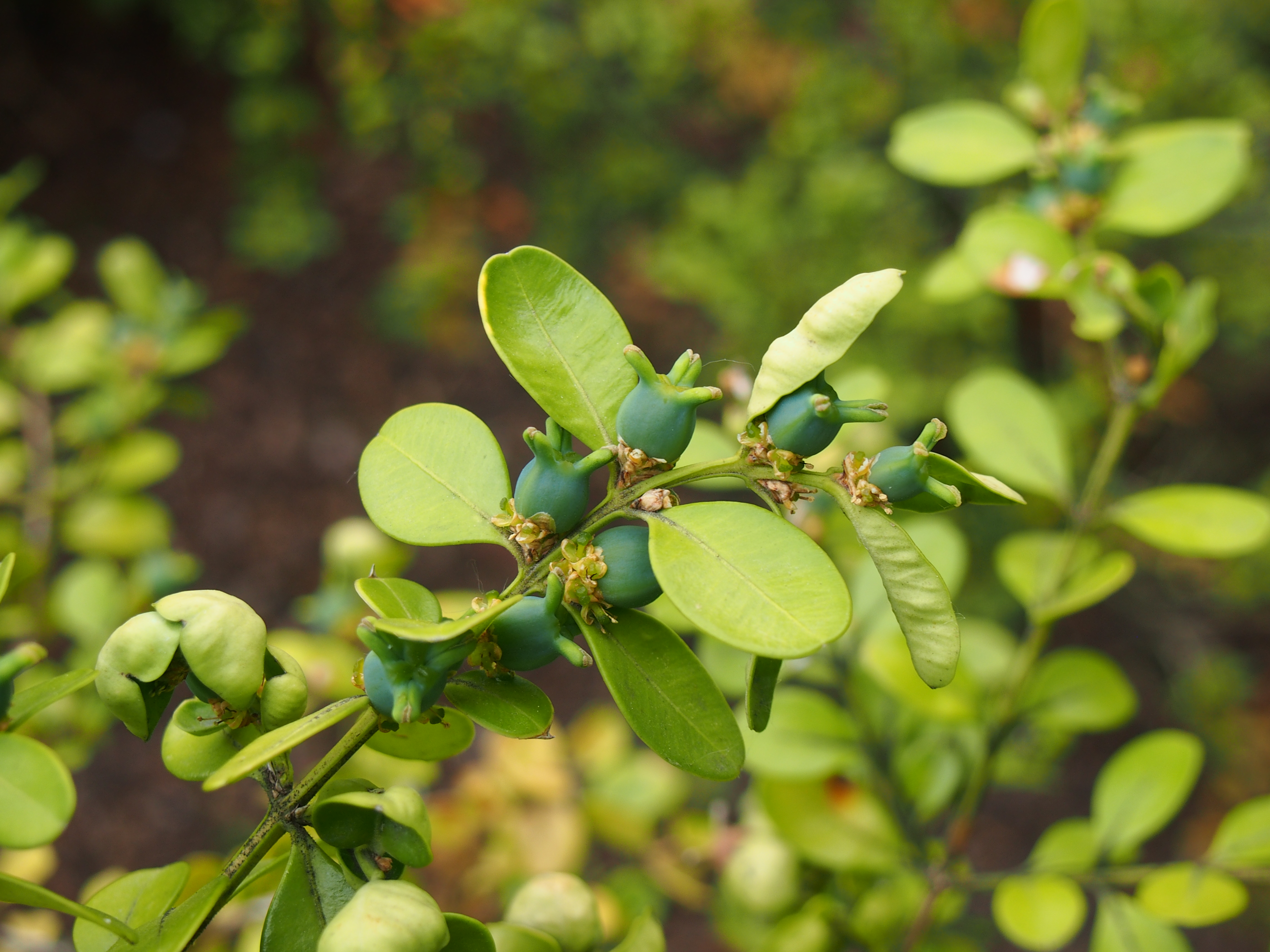
Fruit

== Subtaxa ==
The following varieties are accepted:

- Buxus sinica var. aemulans Rehder & E.H.Wilson) P.Brückn. & T.L.Ming – southern China
- Buxus sinica var. insularis (Nakai) M.Cheng – South Korea, Hiroshima Prefecture, Japan
- Buxus sinica var. intermedia (Hatus.) M.Cheng – Taiwan
- Buxus sinica var. parvifolia M.Cheng – southern China
- Buxus sinica var. pumila M.Cheng – western Hubei
- Buxus sinica var. sinica – central and southern China, introduced to Japan
- Buxus sinica var. vacciniifolia M.Cheng – southern China
