= Boxwood blight =

Fungal disease affecting boxwoods

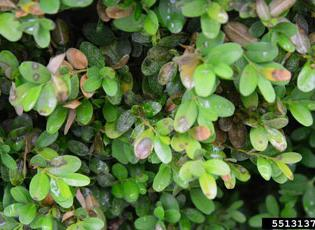
- Boxwood blight, early leaf symptoms
- Causal agents: Cylindrocladium buxicola (also called Calonectria pseudonaviculata)
- Hosts: Boxwood plants
- Vectors: Possibly: Pachysandra(spurge) and Sarcococca (sweetbox)
- EPPO Code: CLYDBU
- Distribution: East and West Coasts of United States and Canada and Europe

Boxwood blight (also known as box blight or boxwood leaf drop) is a widespread fungal disease affecting boxwoods (box plants), caused by Cylindrocladium buxicola (also called Calonectria pseudonaviculata). The disease causes widespread defoliation and eventual death.

== History ==
The first description of boxwood blight was from the United Kingdom in the mid 1990s. In 2002, when the disease was discovered in New Zealand, the cause was identified as a new species of fungus which was formally named Cylindrocladium pseudonaviculatum. The fungus causing the disease in the UK was later named C. buxicola. These are now known to be the same. The current accepted nomenclature for the boxwood blight pathogen (G1 genotype) is Calonectria pseudonaviculata. Boxwood blight is found throughout Europe, and has spread to New Zealand and North America. In the United States, boxwood blight was first reported in North Carolina in September 2011; the disease was observed in Connecticut several weeks later. To date, boxwood blight has been identified in at least 30 U.S. states and several Canadian provinces. The geographic origin of C. pseudonaviculata is unknown, but is hypothesized to be in a center of diversity for Buxus in East Asia, the Caribbean, or Madagascar.

== Hosts ==
There appears to be some tolerance to the disease within the genus Buxus. In general, the boxwood varieties within the species sempervirens tend to be more susceptible to this disease; this would include the most popular varieties 'English' and 'American' boxwood. Other plants within the family Buxaceae, such as Pachysandra terminalis, as well as a Sarcococca species, have also found to be susceptible to this fungal pathogen.

== Symptoms and disease process ==
The blight initially presents as dark or light brown spots or lesions on leaves. The leaves typically turn brown or straw color, then fall off. The stems develop dark brown or black lesions. The disease is often fatal to young plants. The spores remain viable for five years in fallen boxwood leaves, and are dispersed by wind and rain over short distances. Since they are sticky the spores may also be spread by birds, animals, and contaminated clothing and footwear. The most common mode of transmitting the blight is by the introduction of asymptomatic plants, or plants treated with fungicide (which can mask the disease) to unaffected areas. Warm and humid conditions facilitate its spread. The fungus does not need a wound to infect a plant, but it does require high humidity or free water.

== Impacts ==
The ornamental horticulture industries in the United States and parts of Europe have sustained significant financial losses because boxwood blight increases the costs of production of boxwood, and infected plants are unsellable and must be destroyed. The disease has caused declines in native Buxus forests in western Asia, which has reduced habitat and resources for biodiversity and negatively impacted ecosystem services such as soil stability, water quality, and flood protection.

== Treatment ==
There is no known cure for boxwood blight and controlling the disease with chemical treatments is expensive. Fungicides may prevent the spread of the disease. To be effective, they must be applied to the entire plant, leaves and stems, which can be difficult because boxwood leaves are very closely spaced. Details on boxwood blight fungicides are found in LaMondia 2015. Management practices also include inspection of incoming plant material, sanitation, cultural controls including use of cultivars tolerant to infection, and avoidance of overhead irrigation.

== Risk of establishment ==
A climatic suitability study at regional and global scales indicated that C. pseudonaviculata could potentially spread and establish well beyond its currently invaded range in Europe, western Asia, New Zealand, United States and Canada. These include a number of not-yet-invaded areas in eastern and southern Europe, North America, and many regions of the world where boxwood is native. Policy-makers and other stakeholders in these areas should focus on implementing a strict phytosanitary protocol for risk mitigation of accidental introduction of C. pseudonaviculata, have an effective surveillance for early detection, and develop a recovery plan for the pathogen when accidental introductions do occur.
