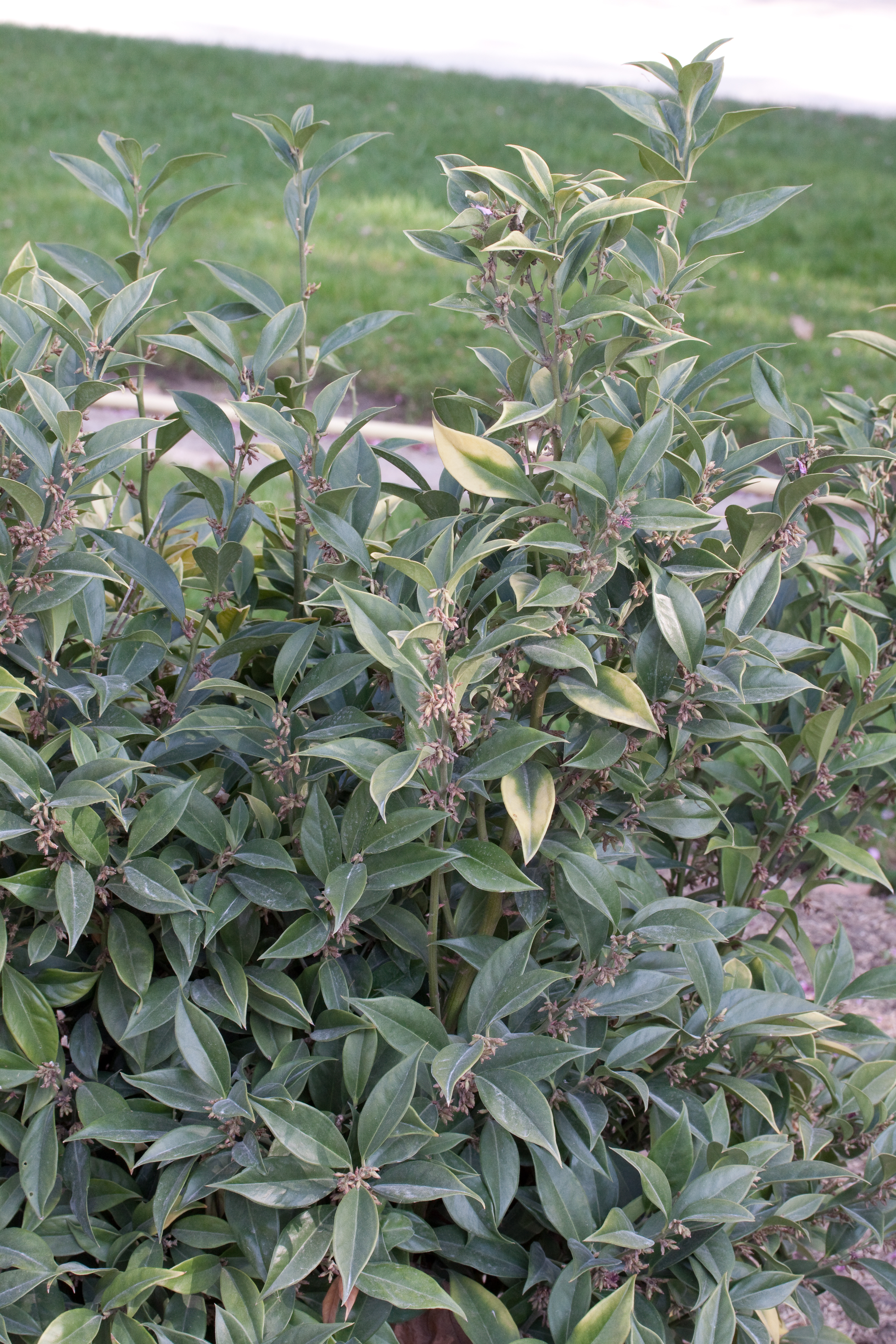

Scientific classification
- Kingdom: Plantae
- Clade: Tracheophytes
- Clade: Angiosperms
- Clade: Eudicots
- Order: Buxales
- Family: Buxaceae
- Genus: Sarcococca
- Species: S. orientalis

Binomial name
- Sarcococca orientalis C.Y.Wu

= Sarcococca orientalis =

Species of flowering plant

Sarcococca orientalis is a species in the genus Sarcococca in the plant family Buxaceae. It is commonly known as Christmas box or sweet box. It is native to Jiangxi province of south-east China, and forms a small evergreen shrub, preferring positions with some shade. The ovate-lanceolate leaves are cuneate at the base and can reach 9 cm in length. The leaves are longer than the leaves of the commonly cultivated S.confusa and broader than S. hookeriana. The pink-tinged white flowers are inconspicuous but sweetly scented, and appear along the branches in midwinter, their scent most noticeable during mild spells. The small fruits (drupes) are black.
