= Sweet box =

Sweet box may refer to:

- The evergreen shrubs of the genus Sarcococca
- Sweetbox, a German pop music group
