= Doorstepping =

Type of media interview

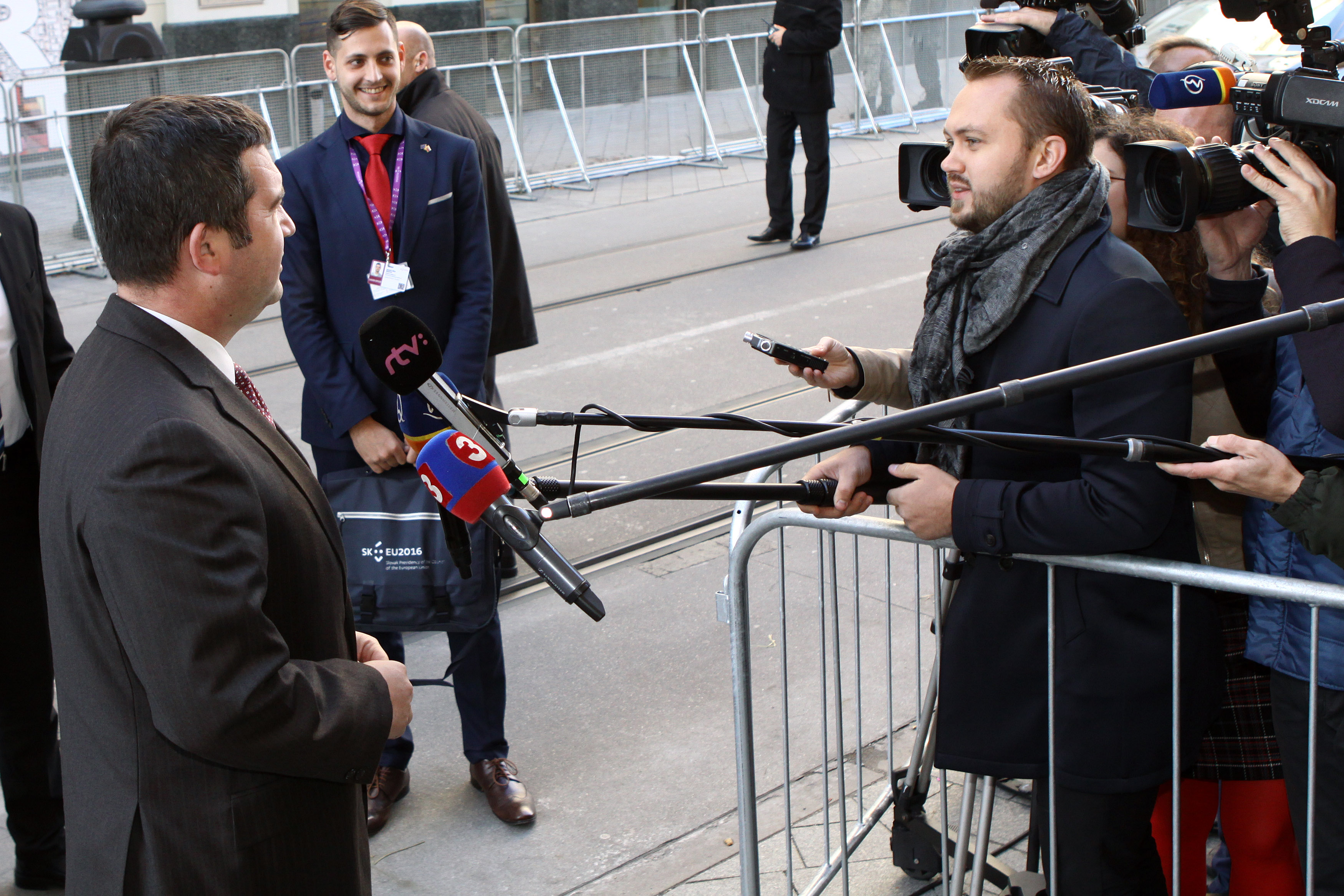
Reporters doorstepping politicians at Bratislava Parliamentary Summit, an informal meeting of Speakers of EU Parliaments

Doorstepping, or door-stepping, is an attempt to obtain an impromptu interview, or piece to camera, from a contributor without prior arrangement or agreement, typically by confronting them in a public space, such as outside their home, workplace, or courthouse. Roger Cook did this on TV in the UK for several decades. Michael Crick was described as a master of the art. In 2010, OFCOM introduced guidelines on doorstepping in the UK.

== See also ==
- The Cook Report
- Gonzo journalism
