= Tony Sarchet =

Tony Sarchet is a British television and radio writer for alternative comedy shows.

Sarchet studied chemistry at University College, Oxford, where he was a member of the University College Players and wrote a revue called Gargoyles at the Oxford Playhouse with John Albery and Graham Wall in 1978.

He started his professional career writing for hit shows including Three of a Kind and Spitting Image, and for comedians such as Lenny Henry and Jasper Carrott.

In 1984, his Sony Award-winning BBC Radio 4 satire Delve Special begun, a comedic parody of Roger Cook's investigative journalism series 'Checkpoint'. This time starring Stephen Fry as investigative journalist David Lander. When Roger Cook moved to television, so did his parody, in the Tony Sarchet written series This is David Lander and This is David Harper (this last series with Tony Slattery in the main role).

Sarchet went on to write the Screen One TV film Trust Me starring Alfred Molina and in 2001 the ITV sitcom High Stakes with Richard Wilson.

Tony Sarchet is married to the writer Andrea Solomons.
