= Debbie Currie =

British journalist (born 1974)

- Born: Deborah Currie; 1974 (age 51–52); Findern, England
- Education: University of Huddersfield
- Occupation: Journalist
- Mother: Edwina Currie

Deborah Currie (born 1974) is a British former journalist and a daughter of Edwina Currie. She released a cover version of "You Can Do Magic" by Limmie & Family Cookin', which charted at number 86 on the UK singles chart and was later revealed to be part of an investigation into chart-rigging by The Cook Report.

== Life and career ==
Deborah Currie was born in 1974. She graduated from Denstone College, and also read English and Communication Arts at the University of Huddersfield, where she worked as a lollipop lady and at George Hotel, Huddersfield. In 1997, Currie covered a version of Limmie & Family Cookin's "You Can Do Magic", with Sinitta providing her vocals. To promote the single, she toured Scotland with pop band The Mojams, claimed that she had enjoyed group sex and lost her virginity at fifteen, told her mother Edwina Currie about the latter in Tesco, and posed with fried eggs on her breasts. Edwina used an interview after her 1997 United Kingdom general election defeat to promote the song.

The song was released on 19 May 1997 on Barry Tomes' Gotham Records and was pulled three days later. Credited to "Mojams featuring Debbie Currie", the song charted at number 86 on the UK singles chart. Later that month, it was revealed that the single was part of a ruse by Roger Cook's The Cook Report to investigate the practice of chart-rigging, that the track had been withdrawn because the programme's budget had run out, and that Currie was in fact a trainee journalist for Central Television who had been chosen for said ruse because of her tabloid history. She later secured an actual recording contract, before moving to the Peak District and taking a job as a gas-meter fitter. In October 2009, she stated that she had become a single mother by choice at age thirty and encouraged having children before finding a partner.
