= Delve Special =

Delve Special is a British BBC Radio 4 comedy starring Stephen Fry as investigative reporter David Lander. It ran for four series from 1984 to 1987, each series being four 30-minute episodes long. It was written by Tony Sarchet and produced by Paul Mayhew-Archer. The first series was wiped by the BBC but has since been found and consisted of a four-part investigation into the proposed building of London's third airport in "Shifton", a small village situated 'just to the north east of Birmingham', and the alleged bribery and corruption that accompanied the choice of location and building contractor.

The premise of the show involved David Lander "confronting wrongdoers and often receiving a sharp physical response whilst his tape recorder still rolled." The programme heavily spoofed the style of topical radio reporters such as John Waite of Face the Facts and Roger Cook, a Radio 4 presenter who went on to television work such as The Cook Report.

Actors appearing in Delve Special included: Tony Robinson, Felicity Montagu, Stephen Frost, Mark Arden, Jack Klaff, Harry Enfield, Dawn French, Brenda Blethyn, Arthur Smith, Janine Duvitski, Philip Pope, Robert Bathurst and Andrew Sachs.

The theme music to the programme was Crunch by Soft Machine.

A follow-up television version ran for two series: This is David Lander (starring Stephen Fry) in 1988, and This is David Harper (starring Tony Slattery) in 1990 - Fry being unavailable for the second series due to other commitments.

== Episodes ==
=== Series 1 ===
No. in season	Title	Original release date
1	"The Shifton Scandal (1)"	3 August 1984
2	"The Shifton Scandal (2)"	10 August 1984
3	"The Shifton Scandal (3)"	17 August 1984
4	"The Shifton Scandal (4)"	24 August 1984

=== Series 2 ===
No. in season	Title	Original release date
1	"The Archibald Gallery Robbery"	6 September 1985
2	"Whose Baby?"	13 September 1985
3	"The Secret Dis-Service"	20 September 1985
4	"The Nicholson Story: Red Faces at MI5"	27 September 1985

=== Series 3 ===
No. in season	Title	Original release date
1	"A Rocket for Defence"	5 September 1986
2	"Cowboys"	12 September 1986
3	"Food for Thought"	19 September 1986
4	"City Limits"	26 September 1986

=== Series 4 ===
No. in season	Title	Original release date
1	"There's One Born Every Minute"	28 August 1987
2	"Bitter Harvest"	4 September 1987
3	"The Not-So-Supergrasses"	11 September 1987
4	"The Resurrection of St Jerome"	18 September 1987
