= Zoraida Luces de Febres =

Venezuelan botanist, naturalist and writer (1922–2015)

Zoraida Luces de Febres (1922–2015) was a Venezuelan botanist whose specialty was grasses (agrostology). She was an important figure in Venezuelan botany for many years.

== Biography ==
Zoraida Luces de Febres was born in Caracas, Venezuela, 1922. She studied for five years under the Swiss geographer and botanist Henri Pittier, then the director of the Servicio Botanico of the Venezuelan Agriculture Ministry. When American agrostologist Mary Agnes Chase came to Venezuela in 1940 to survey grasses and advise on the development of a botanical program, Chase recommended Luces for training at the Smithsonian Institution and offered to let her live at her home in Washington, D.C., during the year that would take. Luces and Chase became close friends.

On her return to Venezuela, Luces became a government botanist and published her Generos de los Gramineas Venezuelas ("Venezuelan Grass Species") in 1942. She was one of Pittier's co-authors on the 1947 Catalogo de la flora Venezolana. In 1960, she translated Chase's First Book of Grasses to Spanish. She published Las Gramineas del Distrito Federal ("Grasses of the Federal District") in 1963. In 1995, she co-authored with botanical artist Bruno Manara a Guía ilustrada del Jardín Botánico de Caracas. She also published many articles in scientific journals.

From 1965-1979, she was on the editorial committee for Acta Botánica Venezuela; she later returned to the publication as president of the Junta Directiva 1994-1999.

== Personal life ==
Luces married Nicomedes Febres. They had at least two children, Jose Nicomedes and Zoraida.

- "Author Details for Zoraida Luces de Febres" (HTML). International Plant Names Index. International Organization for Plant Information (IOPI).
