= Findern =

Village in Derbyshire, England

Coordinates: 52.871°N 1.547°W

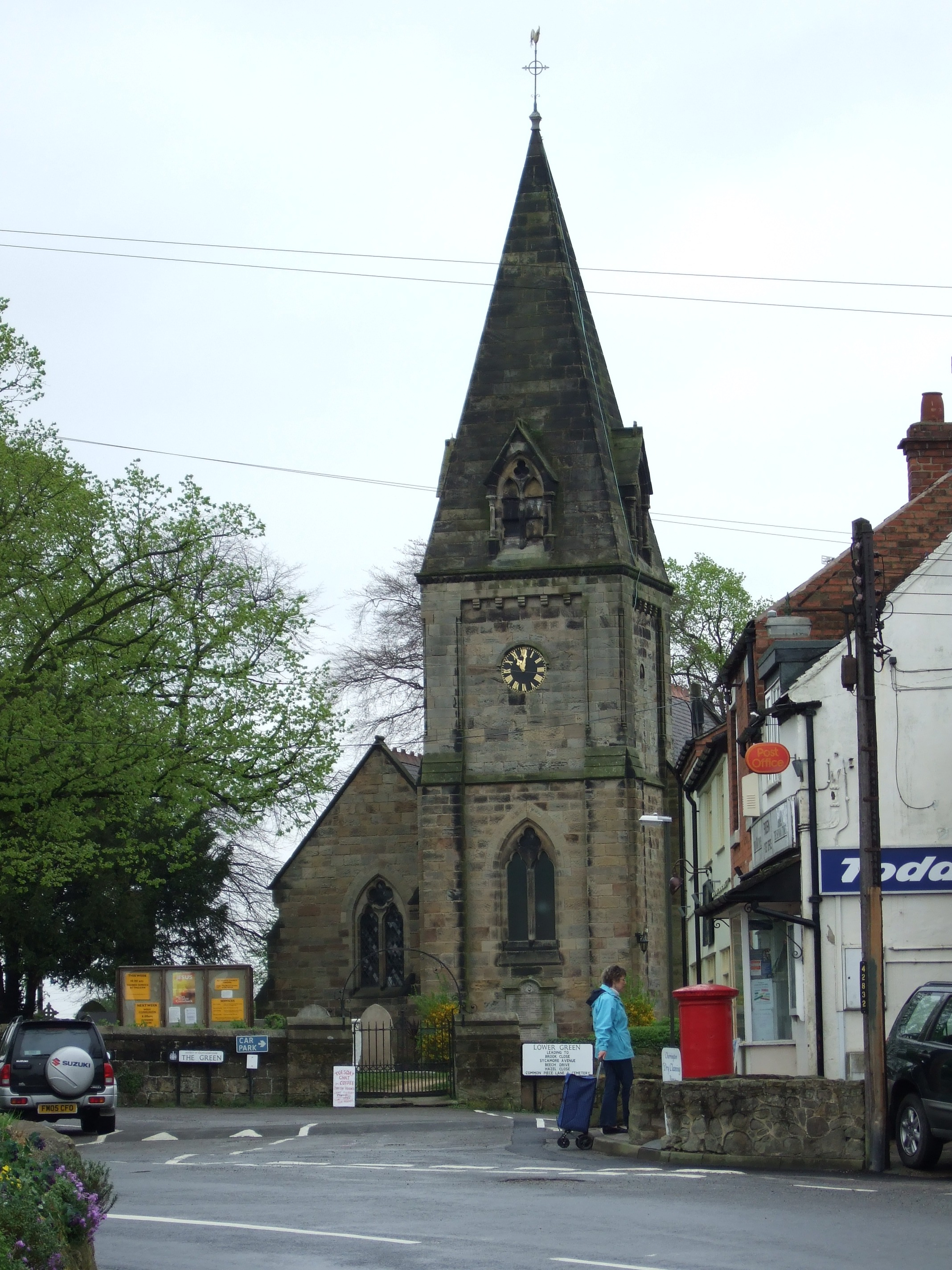
- All Saints' Church, Findern

- Location within Derbyshire
- Population: 1,669 (2011)
- OS grid reference: SK305304
- District: South Derbyshire
- Shire county: Derbyshire
- Region: East Midlands
- Country: England
- Sovereign state: United Kingdom
- Post town: DERBY
- Postcode district: DE65
- Dialling code: 01283
- Police: Derbyshire
- Fire: Derbyshire
- Ambulance: East Midlands

Findern is a village and civil parish in the District of South Derbyshire, approximately 5–6 miles (9.7 km) south of Derby (Grid reference: SK309307). The population of the civil parish was 1,669 at the 2011 Census.

Findern is a picturesque and quaint little village full of charm and character, with many of its buildings being of both historical and architectural importance. Its traditional Old English village green is overlooked by the All Saints' parish church, and is surrounded by a handful of shops, and numerous black and white painted nineteenth century cottages that include The Old Forge, a former farm and blacksmith's shop. The village green plays host to an annual fete and the cottages were originally part of a weaving industry that peaked in 1846, when 22 velvet and silk looms existed, with each dwelling containing its own loom. A row of period buildings continue out onto Main Street with the oldest being from 1620. Somerville House, with its high gateway that allowed carriages to pass under it, was originally a gentleman's residence that was built in the mid 18th century. Its porch, wall and railings were added in the 19th century.

Wallfield House on Doles Lane was constructed in 1822 as a farm, and in the 20th century became the home of racing driver and Aston Martin team manager Reg Parnell. He competed in the inaugural Formula One World Championship Grand Prix at Silverstone in 1950, and in 1959 won both Le Mans and the World Sports Car Championship. Parnell eventually came to live – and farm – at Wallfield House, which is now a residential home, that bears a blue plaque in his memory.

Castle Hill, which previously led to a long since demolished manor house, boasts a village pump, that was used by the entire community until 1931, when mains water finally came to the village. Well Dressing is a long held village tradition. At the top of Hillside stands Tower House which was originally a windmill, built in 1715. It was converted into a private dwelling in 1914 and was the home of Edwina Currie when she was MP for South Derbyshire from the 1980's onwards. It is claimed that on a clear day 22 churches including Lichfield Cathedral can be seen from the mill.

Mercia Marina opened in September 2008 in the 24-acre Willington Lake, surrounded by another 50 acres (0.20 km^{2}) of countryside for dog-walking fields, a wildlife lake and a holiday home development. In building the marina, twelve islands or promontories were added to the natural contours of the lake thus creating a green oasis for people and wildlife alike. This was enhanced by a £85,000 planting scheme, featuring wildflower banks, reed beds, semi mature trees and native plants. For boaters, the layout of Mercia Marina is akin to a series of small marinas joined by wide expanses of open water. The area includes numerous shops, a bar, coffee house and tea rooms.

Findern Primary School on Heath Lane was designed by the pioneering architect George Henry Widdows and constructed in 1924. The highly popular Dobbies Garden Centre is to be found on Doles Lane. The canal at Findern, forms part of the Trent and Mersey Canal, which was completed in 1777, and connects the to more than 70 locks and five tunnels, ultimately joining the River Trent to the River Mersey. The railway line runs alongside the canal and was opened by the Birmingham and Derby Junction Railway on its original route from Derby to Hampton-in-Arden where it met the London and Birmingham Railway for London. The village is nowadays bounded on two sides by major A roads; the A38 and the A50. The former, to the north east, follows the course of the Roman road Icknield Street, while the latter passes to the south of the village centre and runs parallel to the canal. In contrast to the ancient route of the A38, the A50 road was laid only in 1997.

== Jedediah Strutt ==
Jedediah Strutt was born 25 July 1726 in South Normanton, Derbyshire. He was the son of William Strutt, a farmer, and Martha Statham. After showing an early interest in mechanics, Strutt was apprenticed at the age of 14 to Ralph Massey, a wheelwright who lived in Findern. There Strutt lodged at The Old Hall with a hosiery manufacturing family called the Woollatt's. Findern at the time was the base of the Nonconformist Academy with Ebenezer Latham as its headmaster. Latham, as a friend of the Woollatt family, became a key influence on Strutt's early life, and encouraged him to expand his learning. Strutt married Elizabeth Woollatt in 1755, and along with her brother William Woollatt, took out a patent in 1759 for an attachment to a mechanical knitting machine known as a stocking frame. The Derby Rib was a set of barbed hooks, operated vertically among the horizontal needles of the frame, that took the loops from the latter, and reversed them to make a rib stitch.

In 1771, Strutt, and spinner Samuel Need joined Richard Arkwright in the building of a cotton mill at Cromford, using what was henceforth called Arkwright's water frame. This was the first of its kind in the world, marking the beginning of the Industrial Revolution. Further mills followed at Belper in 1778 and Milford in 1782. For each of the mills, Strutt built long rows of worker's houses and both are now part of the Derwent Valley Mills World Heritage Site. In time there would be eight Strutt mills at Belper which would grow to a population of 10,000 by the mid-nineteenth century and be the second largest town in the county.

== Additional history ==
There is a Neolithic cursus 1 ½ miles south of the village.

The village was mentioned in the Domesday Book, when it was held by Burton Abbey as an outlier of Mickleover. A priory once stood near the church, where the monks were supplied with fresh food from the fishponds on Common Piece Lane. After the dissolution of the abbey the Fynderne family, as the principal land-owners, took ownership of the village and the remaining Chapel of Ease. The Fyndernes lived in a fortified manor house on Castle Hill, though none of the house remains.

Sir Geoffrey de Fynderne left the village to join the Crusades, and brought back the Findern Flower, which in the UK only grows in the village, and only in particular areas. The flower has become an emblem of the village and is represented in many guises, including the emblem of Findern Primary School.

In 1694 an early school was started here by Rev. Benjamin Robinson, the local Presbyterian minister (for which he was summoned to explain why to the bishop).

The church was rebuilt and consecrated in 1863, on the site of a Saxon chapel of ease, destroyed by fire. Built of sandstone, it stands adjacent to the village green. The church contains a monument to Isabella de Fynderne dated 1444, and also possesses the oldest parish communion plate in the UK. Findern also has a small Methodist chapel, built in 1835, close to the site of the old priory. The village previously also had an early 18th century Unitarian chapel, built just over five miles from Derby. At that time the law decreed that no Dissenting meeting house should be built less than that distance from the town. It was demolished in 1939.

== Notable people ==
- Benjamin Robinson (1666–1724), a Presbyterian church minister, a respected theologian who started a school in Findern.
- Benjamin Spilsbury (1864–1938), footballer, played for Derby County, scoring their first goal and three times for England
- Joseph Burtt Davy (1870–1940), a Quaker botanist and agrostologist.
- Reg Parnell (1911–1964), racing driver and team manager, drove in seven Formula One Grands Prix
- Edwina Currie (born 1946), writer, broadcaster and former politician, MP for South Derbyshire from 1983 to 1997.
- Mark Todd (born 1954), politician and MP for South Derbyshire from 1997 to 2010.
- Debbie Currie (born 1974), former journalist and a daughter of Edwina Currie

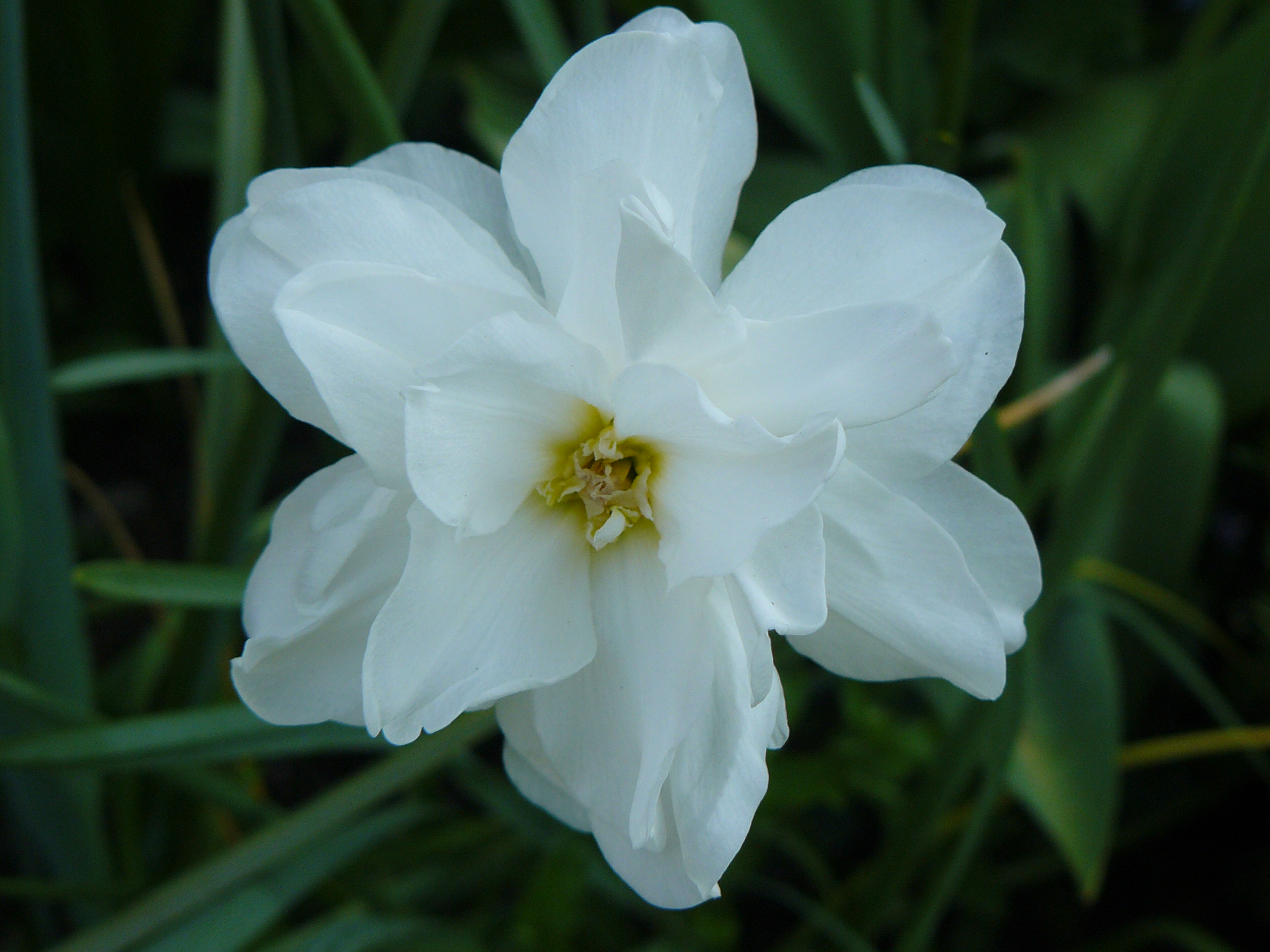
The Findern Flower, Narcissus Poeticus Flore Pleno

== See also ==
- Listed buildings in Findern
