= Terminaline =

Names
- IUPAC name (20S)-20-(Dimethylamino)-5α-pregnane-3β,4α-diol
- Systematic IUPAC name (1S,3aS,3bS,5aR,6S,7S,9aR,9bS,11aS)-1-[(1S)-1-(Dimethylamino)ethyl]-9a,11a-dimethylhexadecahydro-1H-cyclopenta[a]phenanthrene-6,7-diol

Identifiers
CAS Number	15112-49-9
3D model (JSmol)	Interactive image
ChEBI	CHEBI:9455
ChemSpider	154583
PubChem CID	177562
UNII	46M5QL9VR7
CompTox Dashboard (EPA)	DTXSID60934175
- InChI: InChI=1S/C23H41NO2/c1-14(24(4)5)16-8-9-17-15-6-7-19-21(26)20(25)11-13-23(19,3)18(15)10-12-22(16,17)2/h14-21,25-26H,6-13H2,1-5H3/t14-,15-,16+,17-,18-,19-,20-,21-,22+,23+/m0/s1 Key: QTNGLMWAVBOBLJ-RCFZRFIHSA-N; InChI=1/C23H41NO2/c1-14(24(4)5)16-8-9-17-15-6-7-19-21(26)20(25)11-13-23(19,3)18(15)10-12-22(16,17)2/h14-21,25-26H,6-13H2,1-5H3/t14-,15-,16+,17-,18-,19-,20-,21-,22+,23+/m0/s1 Key: QTNGLMWAVBOBLJ-RCFZRFIHBO
- SMILES: C[C@@H]([C@H]1CC[C@@H]2[C@@]1(CC[C@H]3[C@H]2CC[C@@H]4[C@@]3(CC[C@@H]([C@H]4O)O)C)C)N(C)C

Properties
Chemical formula	C_{23}H_{41}NO_{2}
Molar mass	363.586 g·mol^{−1}
- Except where otherwise noted, data are given for materials in their standard state (at 25 °C [77 °F], 100 kPa). Infobox references

Terminaline is a steroidal alkaloid isolated from Sarcococca.
