= Central Weekend =

- Country of origin: United Kingdom

Production
- Producer: Central Independent Television
- Running time: 90mins (inc. adverts)

Original release
- Network: Central Independent Television
- Release: 17 January 1986 – 7 September 2001

Central Weekend (also called Central Weekend Live) is a British television debate show which ran from 1986 to 2001. Known for the confrontational nature of its studio audience and topics, it was presented for many years by Nicky Campbell. It was broadcast late on a Friday night in the Central region, and debated various topics and current affairs issues – usually subjects that had been featured in the week's news.

Though Campbell was the main host, there were a number of other presenters who joined him throughout the show's time on air. These included Anna Soubry, Adrian Mills, Kaye Adams, Sue Jay, Andy Craig, Gregg Upwards, Eamonn Holmes, Roger Cook, Bibi Baskin, Paul Ross, John Stapleton, James Whale, Ed Doolan, Victoria Derbyshire, Patricia Mitchell and Claudia Winkleman. The theme music was composed by Andy Quin.

== History ==
The show was broadcast live from the Central Television studios on Broad Street, Birmingham, although it was later moved to the Nottingham studios at Lenton Lane. It became a popular highlight of the week's television in the Midlands region and enjoyed a 40% share of the viewing audience. Confrontational from the outset, debates could become quite heated and audience members sometimes had to be restrained by on-set bouncers. However, on at least one occasion, the show's floor manager was assaulted by one of the returning guests & on another occasion in 1986, then main presenter Roger Cook sustained a broken leg after being hit by a debt collector's car when the former confronted him on a report on Money & debt collectors.

In 1987, it became the first British television programme to examine seriously the AIDS virus. Central subsequently produced a drama series on the topic, called Intimate Contact.

On 25 March 1988, the former MP John Stonehouse collapsed on set during an edition of the programme which was filming a segment about missing people. He was given emergency medical treatment at the studio and taken to hospital, where he was diagnosed as having suffered from a minor heart attack.

During the 1992 General Election campaign, Conservative MP Edwina Currie poured a glass of orange juice over Labour's Peter Snape shortly after an edition of the show had finished airing. Speaking about the incident later, Currie said "I just looked at my orange juice, and looked at this man from which this stream of abuse was emanating, and thought 'I know how to shut you up.' ".

During a debate on women's football on 6 March 1998, an audience member got drunk and ran amok on set, forcing the show to be taken off the air. 44-year-old Robert Davy was later jailed for 12 months over the incident.

In 2001, a complaint was made to the Independent Television Commission after it emerged that an edition of the show had featured fake guests. A debate on the effects of soap operas on the lives of individuals had featured two patients of a "soap clinic", who it later emerged had been fakes.

== Similar programmes ==
Due to the programme's popularity in the Midlands, similar shows were aired in other regions. For example, Granada aired a show called Up Front, while Tyne Tees had Late and Live. Carlton Television's Thursday Night Live went out in a similar slot on Thursday evenings; it was also presented by Nicky Campbell. All three featured much the same kind of debate as Central Weekend.

A national version of Central Weekend was also shown throughout the ITV Network: Late & Loud , which was produced from 1996 to 1997 and screened overnight. Thursday Night Live was networked from late 1998 to 1999, as well.
