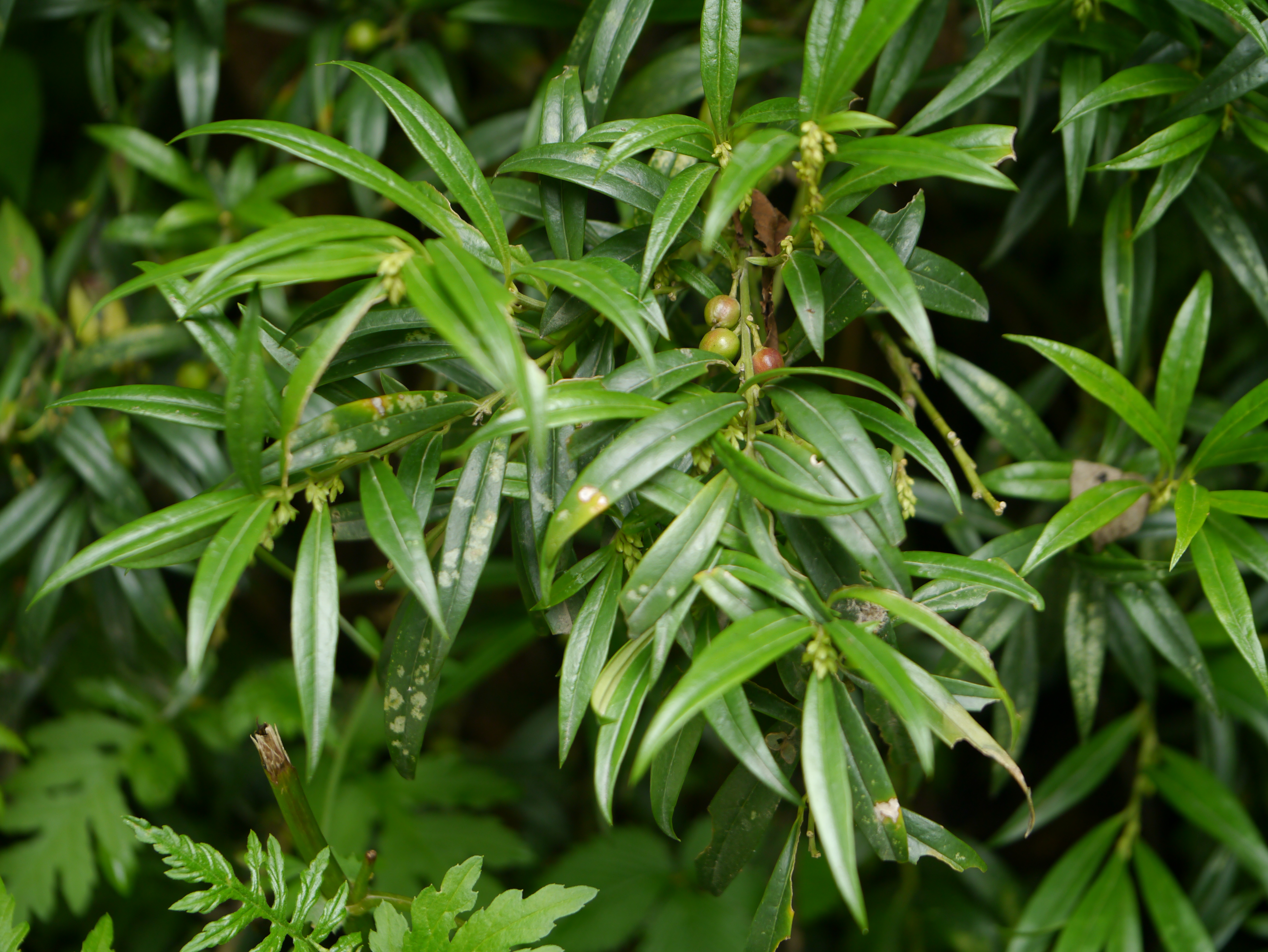
- Sarcococca saligna

Scientific classification
- Kingdom: Plantae
- Clade: Tracheophytes
- Clade: Angiosperms
- Clade: Eudicots
- Order: Buxales
- Family: Buxaceae
- Genus: Sarcococca
- Species: S. saligna

Binomial name
- Sarcococca saligna (D.Don) Müll.Arg.

= Sarcococca saligna =

Species of flowering plant

Sarcococca saligna, the sweet box or Christmas box, is a species of flowering plant in the family Buxaceae. This shrub is native to northern Pakistan. Its common name in Pakistan is sheha.

== Biological activity and medical usage ==
In traditional medicine of Pakistan, the leaves of Sarcococca saligna are used as laxative, blood purifier and muscular analgesic.

The aqueous-methanolic extract of S. saligna has saponins, flavonoids, tannins, phenols, and alkaloids which have calcium channel blocking activity. Therefore, this shrub shows cardio-suppressant, vasodilator and tracheal relaxant effects. In addition, ethanolic extract of S. saligna has steroidal alkaloids which can demonstrate cholinesterase inhibitory activity.

The ethanolic extract of S. saligna indicate antibacterial activity against several human pathogenic bacteria and antifungal activity against Aspergillus species. This extract can increase the antifungal activity of fluconazole against resistant Aspergillus species.
