= Salmonella-in-eggs controversy =

British political controversy

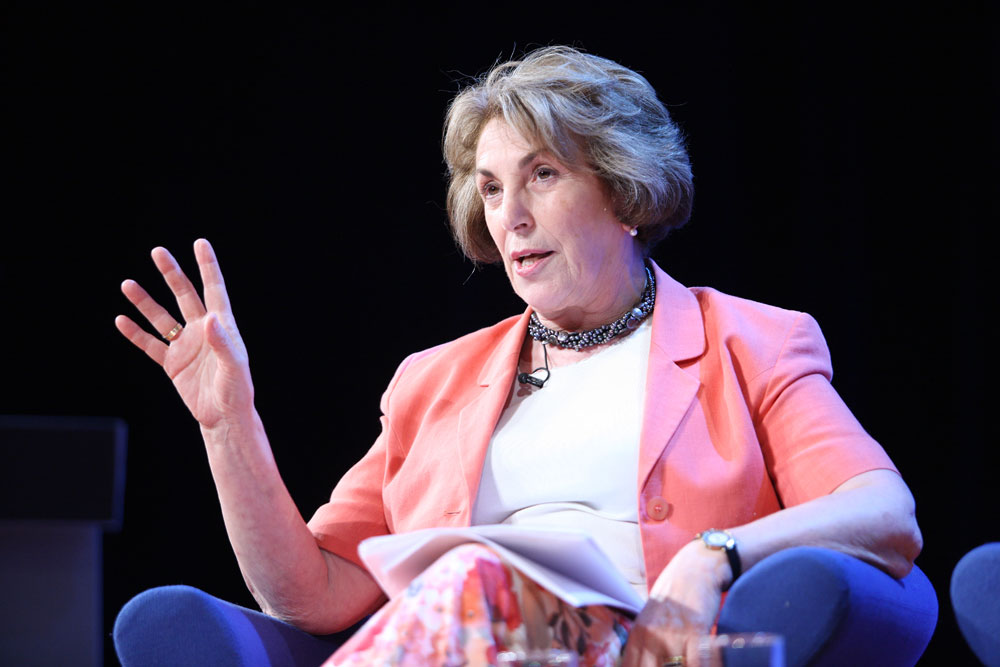
Edwina Currie caused controversy over a statement about salmonella in eggs

The salmonella-in-eggs controversy was a political controversy in the United Kingdom caused by the Parliamentary Under-Secretary of State for Health, Edwina Currie's claims that "most of the egg production in this country, sadly, is now affected with salmonella" in 1988. These claims led to a 60 percent decline in egg sales over the next few weeks, and angered both politicians and those in the egg production industry. Currie's statement also resulted in the destruction of around 400 million eggs and the slaughter of around 4 million hens. The controversy dominated Currie's tenure as Parliamentary Under-Secretary of State for Health and resulted in her resignation two weeks later.

== Background ==
Salmonella enteritidis had grown to become a larger worldwide issue in the late 1970s and 1980s than it had been in previous decades, with cases having quadrupled in the first half of 1988 alone. Poultry World reported a "sudden scourge of Salmonella enteriditis" but claimed that the attack on eggs' reputation had been "politically motivated". The magazine's editor, John Farrant, commented that it was "one of the most serious threats ever faced by the industry". At the time of Currie's warning, 12,302 cases had been reported.

== Interview ==
On 3 December 1988 Currie stated in a television interview for ITN:

We do warn people now that most of the egg production in this country, sadly, is now affected with salmonella. If, however, they've used a good source of eggs, a good shop that they know, and they're content, then there sees—there seems no reason for them to stop, but we would advise strongly against using raw egg, mayonnaise and dressings and Bloody Marys and that sort of thing. They are not a good idea anymore.

Years after this statement, Currie wrote that she had misspoken and had meant to say "much of the egg production" rather than "most of the egg production". Additionally, Currie had meant that the egg production flocks were infected rather than the eggs themselves.

== Reactions ==
Outrage was sparked across the United Kingdom. Egg farmers and producers called on Currie to resign, and some threatened to sue. The British Egg Industry Council called Currie's statement "highly irresponsible" and "factually incorrect" and it sought advice on whether or not it was able to sue her. The National Farmers' Union of England and Wales also sought damages. The Ministry of Agriculture, Fisheries and Food expressed anger towards Currie's comments and the Department of Health was unable to back up her claims. In addition, the Ministry of Agriculture had previously tested eggs without finding any salmonella. The chance of becoming ill with salmonella was put at less than 1 in 200 million.

On 3 December in the House of Lords, Robert Hunter, Baron Hunter of Newington asked the government what steps had taken to protect the poultry and egg industry. The Parliamentary Under-Secretary of State for Agriculture, Fisheries and Food, Jean Barker, Baroness Trumpington replied to the question with:

We must keep this problem in perspective. The number of outbreaks in 1988 is very small in relation to the number of eggs which are eaten every day. Nevertheless, I know that the poultry industry accepts its responsibility to consumers to reduce to an absolute minimum the number of salmonella organisms present in or on food.

== Result and aftermath ==
The controversy caused weekly losses in the egg industry of £5 million, and 5,000 of the United Kingdom's chicken farmers facing bankruptcy. In the following days and weeks, egg sales dropped 60 percent, and were still 30 percent down in January 1989. It took another 25 years for egg sales to return to what they had been before 1988. An estimated 4 million layers were terminated across the UK, and around 400 million eggs were destroyed. The government paid millions of pounds worth of compensation to those affected by covering the cost of layers that had been slaughtered at a cost of £1.75 per hen, and by buying up the remaining 10 million unwanted eggs at 30 pence a dozen. The pressure from the industry and the lack of support from MPs from major farming constituencies resulted in Currie's resignation as Parliamentary Under-Secretary of State for Health on 16 December. She was nicknamed "Eggwina" after the affair.

In 1998, the Lion Quality Mark Scheme was introduced, which requires hens to be vaccinated against Salmonella enteritidis. In December 2001, a Whitehall report was revealed that had been produced in February 1989, two months after Currie's resignation, and covered up by the government. The report found that there had been a "salmonella epidemic of considerable proportions". However, the Chief Medical Officer for England, Donald Acheson had urged at the time that the word "epidemic" should not be used except "in a technical sense".
