= Listed buildings in Findern =

Findern is a civil parish in the South Derbyshire district of Derbyshire, England. The parish contains eight listed buildings that are recorded in the National Heritage List for England. All the listed buildings are designated at Grade II, the lowest of the three grades, which is applied to "buildings of national importance and special interest". The parish contains the village of Findern and the surrounding area. The listed buildings consist of houses and associated structures, and a church and its churchyard wall.

== Buildings ==
Name and location	Photograph	Date	Notes
Corner House; 52.87146°N 1.54264°W		Early 18th century	The house is in rendered brick with floor bands, and a tile roof with coped gables and plain kneelers. There are two storeys, an L-shaped plan, and a front of three bays. In the centre is a gabled porch, and the windows are sashes with wedge lintels, the middle window in the upper floor blind.
19 Main Street and outbuilding 52.87007°N 1.54458°W	—	18th century	The house and outbuilding are in red brick with a tile roof. There are two storeys and two bays. The left bay is lower, and has a dentilled cornice, a casement window in the ground floor and a horizontally-sliding sash window above. The taller right bay contains a segmental-headed doorway, and a sash window in each floor. The single-storey outbuilding continues to the right.
Somerville House and outbuilding 52.87014°N 1.54435°W		Mid 18th century	The house and outbuilding are in red brick. The house has a dentilled cornice, a tile roof, two storeys and an attic, and a symmetrical front of five bays. In the centre is a gabled porch with a wavy bargeboard, the door has a fanlight, and the windows are sashes with wedge lintels. Along the front is a low wall with railings, and to the left is a carriageway linked to a barn with a Welsh slate roof containing windows and blocked slit vents.
Tower House; 52.87318°N 1.55164°W		Late 18th century	A windmill that has been extended and converted into a house, it is in rendered brick with a tile roof. The house has two storeys and the mill has three. The mill is circular and tapering, and has an octagonal roof. It contains a doorway with a fanlight, and windows with slightly segmental heads.
Willow Farmhouse and outbuildings 52.87250°N 1.54382°W	—	Early 19th century	The farmhouse and outbuildings are in red brick. The house has a dentilled cornice, a Welsh slate roof, two storeys, and a symmetrical front of five bays. In the centre is a doorway with Doric half-columns, an entablature, and a rectangular fanlight. The windows are sashes with wedge lintels. To the rear are outbuildings on a chamfered plinth, with tile roofs, and a dentilled cornice. They contain a segmental-headed opening, a square opening, and vents in a diamond pattern.
Cowhouse southeast of 19 Main Street; 52.86989°N 1.54449°W	—	1862	The cowhouse is in red brick with a tile roof. There is a single storey, and it contains three doorways and three windows, all with segmental heads.
All Saints' Church; 52.87073°N 1.54263°W		1863–64	The church is built in sandstone with Welsh slate roofs, and consists of a nave, a north aisle, a south porch, a chancel and north vestry, and a west steeple. The steeple has a tower with two stages, clasping buttresses, a chamfered string course, clock faces, a corbel table, a pyramidal spire with lucarnes acting as bell openings, and a weathervane.
Walls and gateway, All Saints Churchyard; 52.87042°N 1.54242°W	—	c. 1864	The walls enclose the south and west sides of the churchyard, and are in sandstone with chamfered copings. On the west side, they rise to form piers with two-tier chamfered tops. Between the piers are a decorative arch and a pair of gates, all in wrought iron.
