= Sarcococca zeylanica =

Scientific classification
- Kingdom: Plantae
- Clade: Tracheophytes
- Clade: Angiosperms
- Clade: Eudicots
- Order: Buxales
- Family: Buxaceae
- Genus: Sarcococca
- Species: S. zeylanica

Binomial name
- Sarcococca zeylanica Baill.

Species of shrub

Sarcococca zeylanica is a species of evergreen shrub or groundcover, endemic to Sri Lanka.
