= This Is David Lander =

- Starring: Stephen Fry; Tony Slattery
- Country of origin: United Kingdom
- Original language: English
- No. of series: 2
- No. of episodes: 12

Production
- Running time: 30 minutes (inc. adverts)
- Production company: Hat Trick Productions

Original release
- Network: Channel 4
- Release: 31 October 1988 – 7 December 1990

This Is David Lander is a comedy television show starring Stephen Fry playing an investigative reporter. It parodies Roger Cook style doorstepping investigative journalism shows. It was written by Tony Sarchet.

It began as the BBC Radio 4 show Delve Special, which became this six-part Channel 4 series in 1988.

== This Is David Harper ==
For the 1990 series, Stephen Fry was engaged with other work commitments and the series was renamed This Is David Harper with Tony Slattery replacing Fry's character with a minor name-change.
