= High Stakes (TV series) =

- Opening Tiles of High Stakes
- Genre: Sitcom
- Starring: Richard Wilson; Jack Shepherd; Jason O'Mara
- Country of origin: United Kingdom
- No. of series: 1 (plus 1 unaired)
- No. of episodes: 6 (plus 6 unaired)

Production
- Running time: 30 minutes

Original release
- Network: ITV
- Release: 22 April – 27 May 2001

The High Stakes is a British sitcom starring Richard Wilson that aired in 2001. It was written by Tony Sarchet. The second series remains unaired.

== Plot ==
Nicholas Quinn, a former Treasury official, is the new chairman of an investment bank called Kendrick Maple, a company that is in need of modernising. The managing director is long-standing employee Bruce Morton and he is outraged by Quinn's attempt to modernise. Between them is young, high-flyer Greg Hayden, who often acts as a mediator.

== Cast ==
- Richard Wilson as Bruce Morton
- Jack Shepherd as Nicholas Quinn
- Jason O'Mara as Greg Hayden

== Episodes ==
Title	Airdate	Overview
"Soulmates"	22 April	Nicholas Quinn, the new chairman of Kenrick Maple, decides that the bank needs a new culture of trust and openness.An investor uses astrology to make his investments. Bruce asks Greg Hayden to arrange a meeting for him with a member of Clay's team, Rebecca Parsons. Clay may be in trouble. After Clay plots Bruce and Nicholas's astrological charts, he pleads with Nicholas and Bruce for one of them to leave the bank. Nicholas asks Bruce to go to Birmingham for a meeting with a Latvian Trade Delegation the following afternoon. Nicholas contacts Delphina, a hypnotist, and convinces her to hypnotize Clay without his knowledge.
"An Act of Defiance"	29 April	Greg Hayden is on the phone to his girlfriend, Lisa, who is in London for the weekend. He is anxious for Nicholas to approve the Strategy Review, but, when Nicholas returns from a Stress Management seminar, he makes many changes to the Strategy Review. Bruce sees Greg changing his shirt in the office, and learns that Lisa is over from New York. Bruce tries to persuade Nicholas to call off an investigation about sex in the office. Nicholas assumes Bruce is the guilty party. Nicholas questions Natalie, his new temp, about work relationships; so she thinks he is talking about sex with him, and is horrified.
"The Devil Is In The Detail"	6 May	Bruce Morton arrives for work at the bank, happy to hear from Greg that Nicholas Quinn is in his office. Bruce is angry about a new trader reporting system that Nicholas has introduced. A successful trader, Mary Mansfield, tells Nicholas at the lunch that she has made £46 million for the bank. Bruce questions Brian Wallis, head of Trading, about Mary's trading. She is a quant analyst whom Brian allowed to do a little trading to get a feel for it. Nicholas asks Professor Donnelly to check over Mary's transactions. Donnelly tells Nicholas that Mary has made a loss of £83 million.
"The Poacher"	13 May	Bruce tells Greg that he is expecting some emails from their Far East Traders. They are addressed to him using the joke nickname "Monkey Balls." Greg tells him that Nicholas has installed computer software that is acting up, and people have to send faxes, rather than e-mails. Needing to fill the post of head of Eurobonds, Nicholas decides to employ the services of a head-hunter, Christabel Webster.
"The Challenge"	20 May	Bruce takes over as chairman of Kenrick Maple, while Nicholas is away at a European Banking Conference for four days. Bruce tells Greg that he saw Mike Burchett and Pete Salter skulking in the corridor. Bruce's instinct tells him that Pete and Mike are thinking of leaving the bank and he decides to question Mike. Bruce goes for an evening drink with Mike and is disappointed with what he finds out. Greg tells Bruce that they must stop Pete and Mike from staging a Boardroom coup. Nicholas returns, to be told that Mike has made an important decision.
"Dream Team"	27 May	Emily, the bank's Corporate Affairs spokesperson, has prepared a statement about the repayment of a £30 million loan to the bank, from Michael Calderwood, at the Crastock Group. Stapnall-Phillips, head of Corporate Finance, tries to reassure Bruce and Nicholas that Crastock is not going to collapse. Bruce and Nicholas ask Calderwood to repay the loan, and he agrees. Later, Nicholas and Bruce must ask Calderwood, again, for repayment of the loan. Nicholas is thrilled when Calderwood gives him a gold flute, and invites him and Bruce to his birthday party.

A second series of High Stakes was written and made and was due to air in winter 2001.

== DVD releases ==
The first series and unaired second series was released on DVD in Region 2 (UK) on 14 May 2007, distributed by Acorn Media UK.
