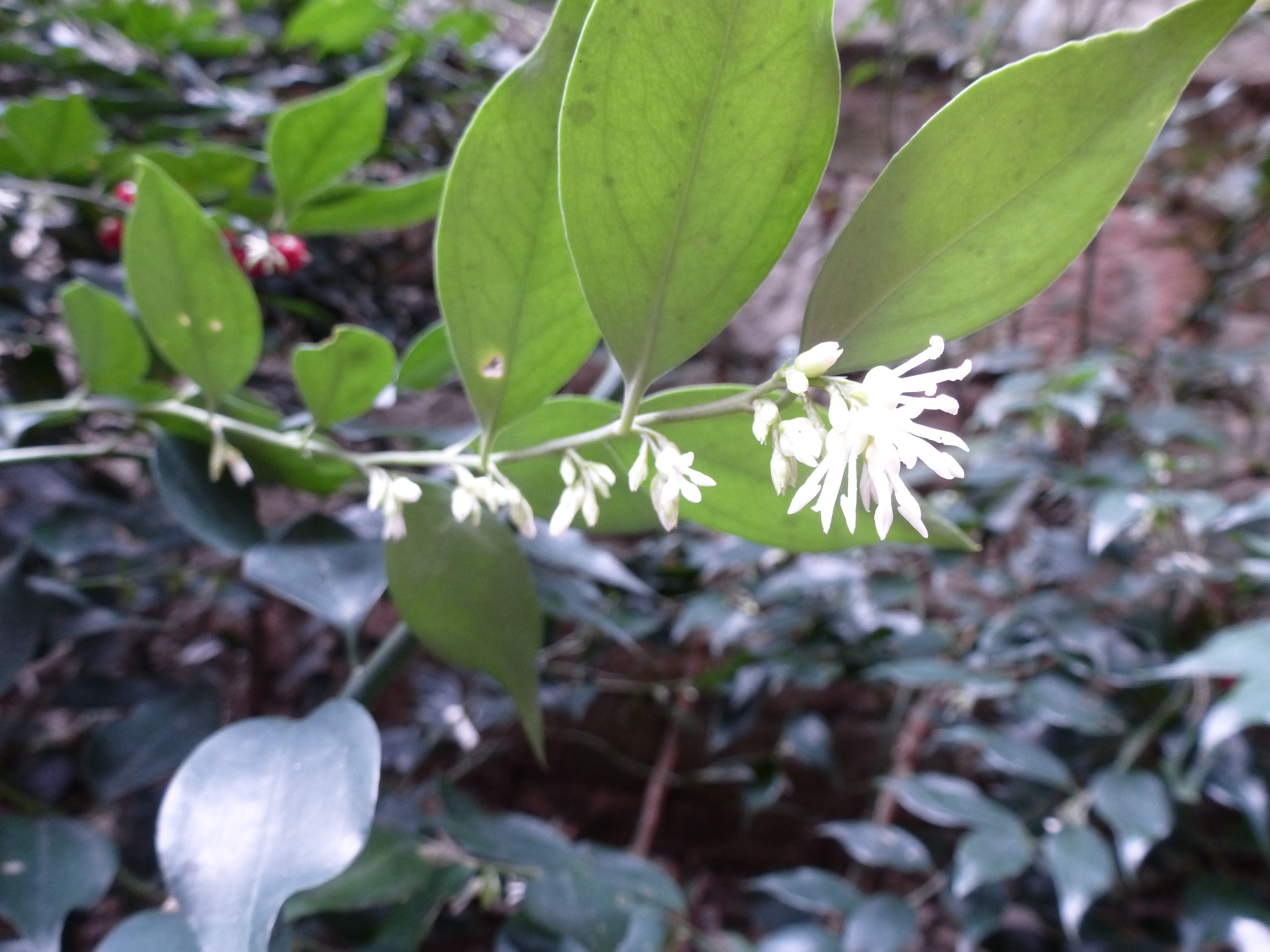

Scientific classification
- Kingdom: Plantae
- Clade: Tracheophytes
- Clade: Angiosperms
- Clade: Eudicots
- Order: Buxales
- Family: Buxaceae
- Genus: Sarcococca
- Species: S. ruscifolia

Binomial name
- Sarcococca ruscifolia Stapf

= Sarcococca ruscifolia =

Species of flowering plant

Sarcococca ruscifolia (野扇花) is a species of flowering plant in the box family Buxaceae, native to China (Gansu, Guangxi, Guizhou, Hubei, Hunan, Shanxi, Sichuan, C, NW, and SE Yunnan), where it inhabits forested mountain slopes. Growing to 1 m (3.3 ft) tall and broad, it is a compact evergreen shrub with shiny oval leaves. Fragrant white flowers in winter are followed by red berries.

The Latin specific epithet ruscifolia means "with leaves like Ruscus (butcher's broom)",.

Sarcococca ruscifolia is cultivated as an ornamental plant. It is hardy down to −15 °C (5 °F) but prefers a sheltered spot in full or partial shade. The cultivar 'Dragon Gate' has gained the Royal Horticultural Society's Award of Garden Merit.

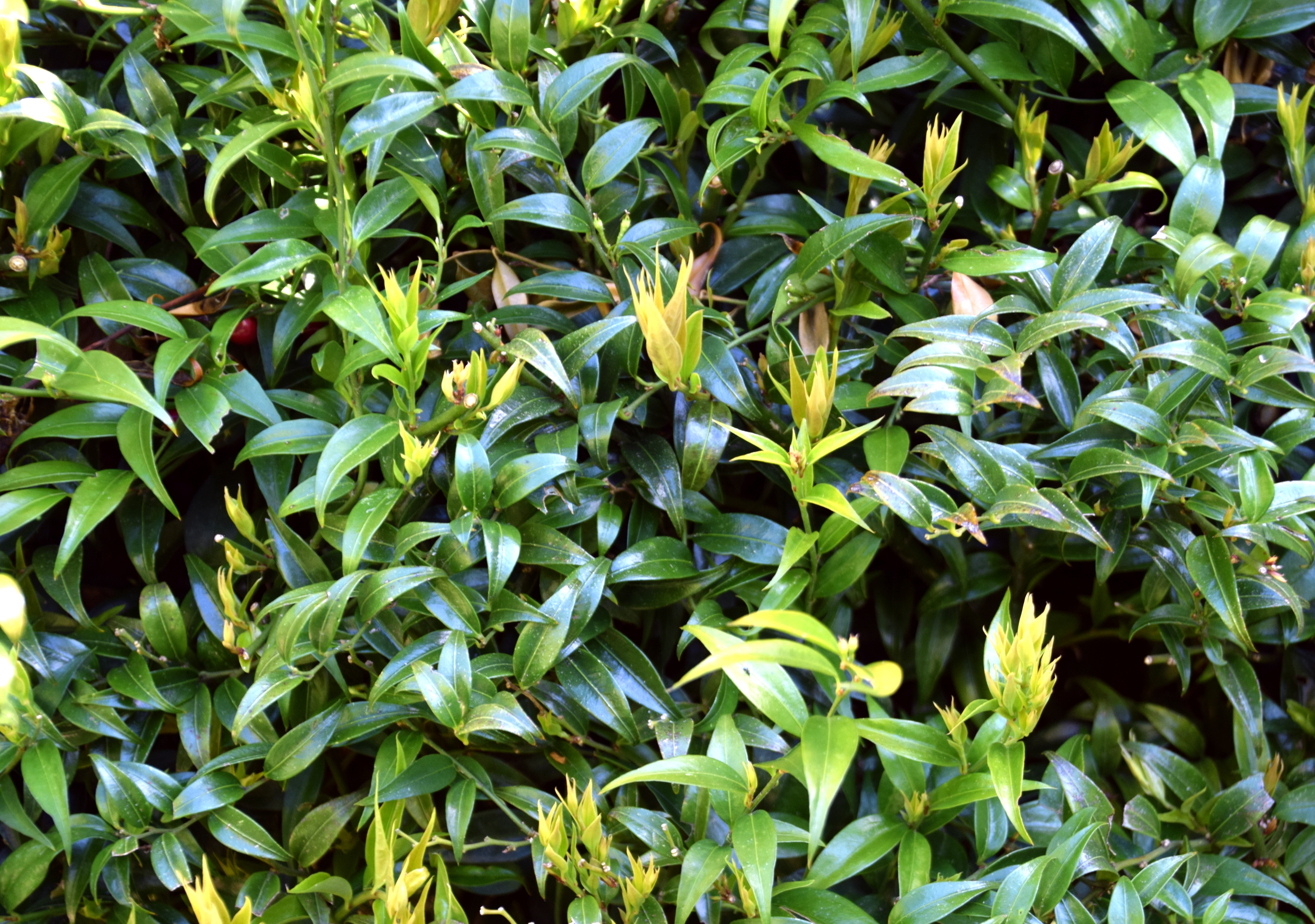
Foliage

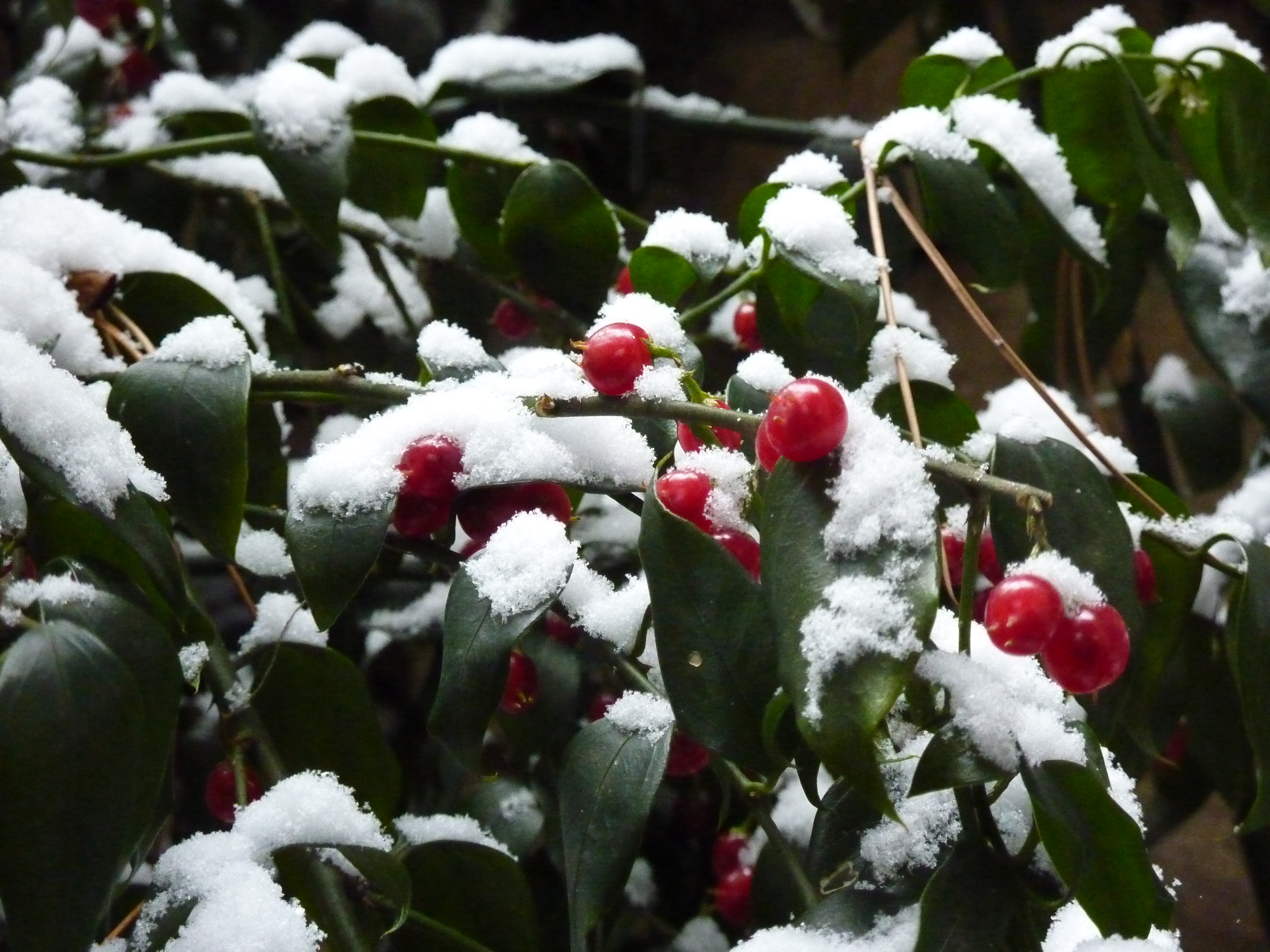
Berries in winter
