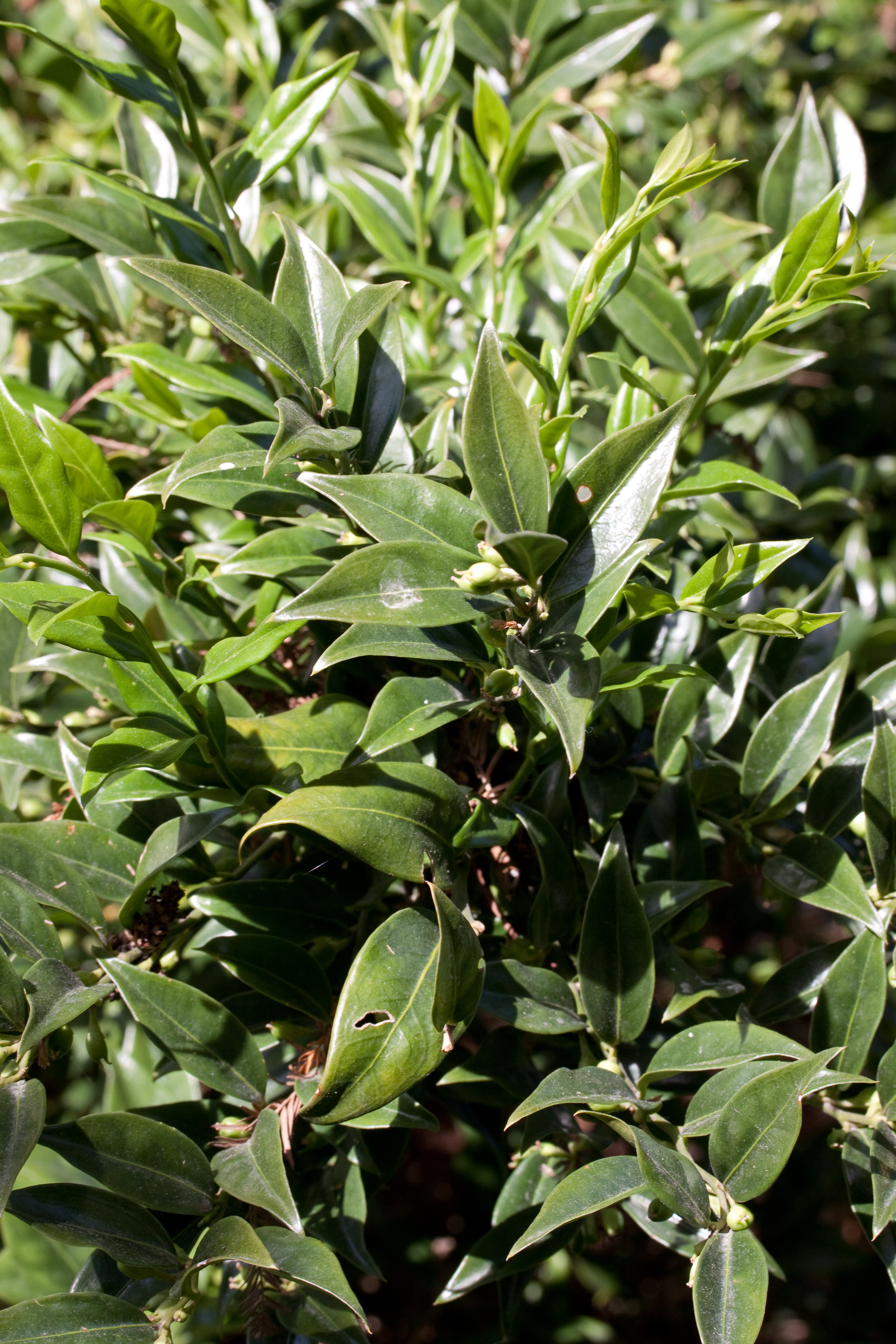

Scientific classification
- Kingdom: Plantae
- Clade: Tracheophytes
- Clade: Angiosperms
- Clade: Eudicots
- Order: Buxales
- Family: Buxaceae
- Genus: Sarcococca
- Species: S. confusa

Binomial name
- Sarcococca confusa Sealy

= Sarcococca confusa =

Species of flowering plant

Sarcococca confusa, the sweet box, is a species of flowering plant in the family Buxaceae, probably native to western China. It is an evergreen shrub growing to 2 m (7 ft) tall by 1 m (3 ft) broad, with glossy green ovate leaves and honey-scented white flowers in winter, followed by glossy black spherical fruits, 5 mm in diameter.

This plant has gained the Royal Horticultural Society's Award of Garden Merit.

== Description ==
Sarcococca confusa is a very adaptable and reliable shrub that is easily grown in many situations, including dense shade with very dry soil. It will however grow in full sun, even though the foliage appears to bleach a little. The soil should be kept damp if grown in sun or part shade. The shrub is midwinter flowering with a sweet scent. The small black berries are eaten by birds which disperse the seeds. It is an evergreen shrub growing to 2 m (7 ft) tall by 1 m (3 ft) broad, with glossy green ovate leaves and honey-scented white flowers in winter, followed by glossy black spherical fruits, 5 mm in diameter.
