= Agrostology =

Scientific study of the grasses

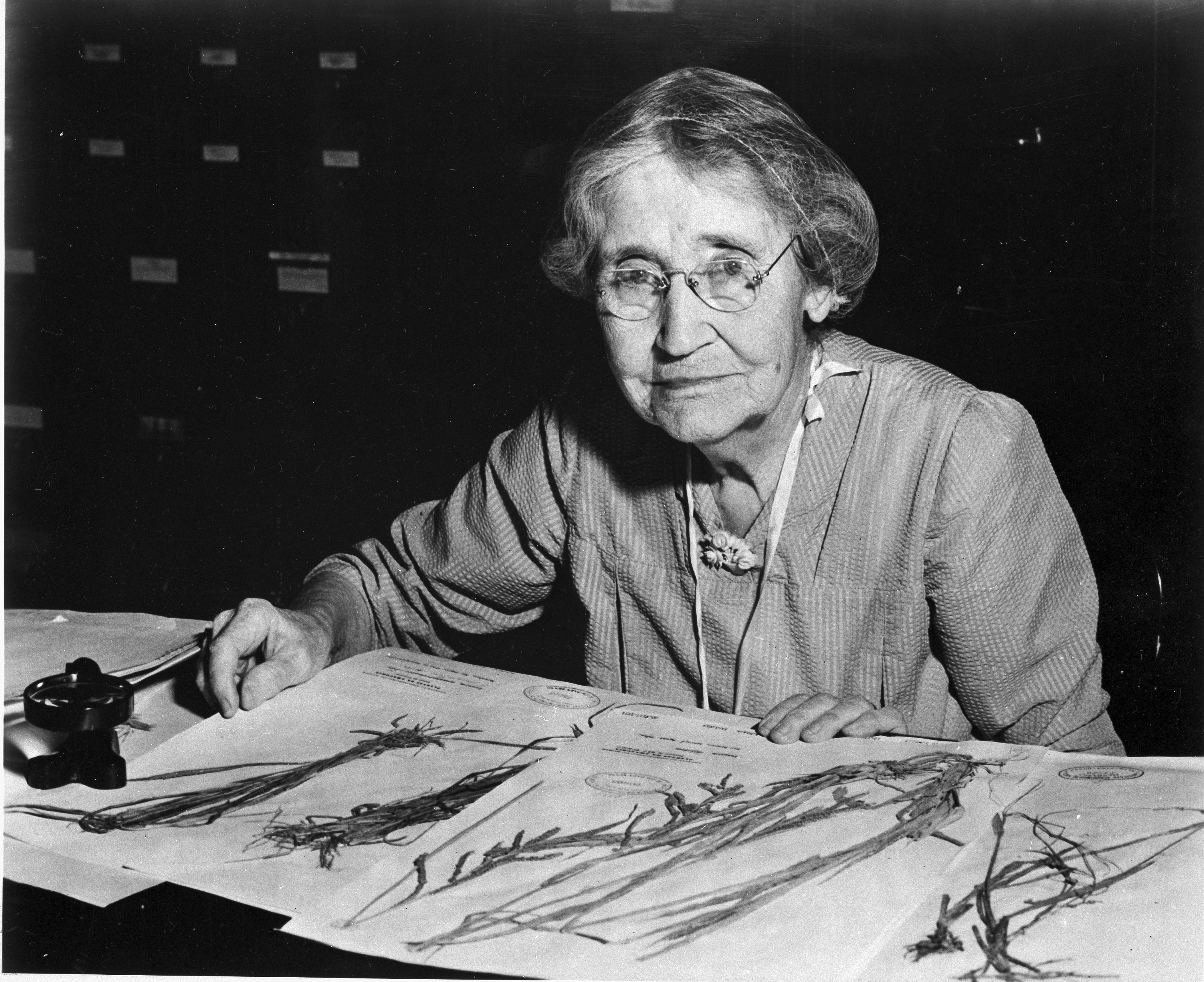
Mary Agnes Chase studying grass specimens, around 1960

Agrostology (from Greek ἄγρωστις, agrōstis, "type of grass"; and -λογία, -logia), sometimes graminology, is the scientific study of the grasses (the family Poaceae, or Gramineae). The grasslike species of the sedge family (Cyperaceae), the rush family (Juncaceae), and the bulrush or cattail family (Typhaceae) are often included with the true grasses in the category of graminoid, although strictly speaking these are not included within the study of agrostology. In contrast to the word graminoid, the words gramineous and graminaceous are normally used to mean "of, or relating to, the true grasses (Poaceae)".

Agrostology has importance in the maintenance of wild and grazed grasslands, agriculture (crop plants such as rice, maize, sugarcane, and wheat are grasses, and many types of animal fodder are grasses), urban and environmental horticulture, turfgrass management and sod production, ecology, and conservation.

== Notable agrostologists ==
Botanists that made important contributions to agrostology include:

- Norman Loftus Bor, In 1962 the Linnean Society awarded him their gold medal, the highest recognition a botanist can receive
- Jean Bosser, the plant Euphorbia bosseri was named after her
- Aimée Antoinette Camus
- Mary Agnes Chase, named 667 species
- William Derek Clayton, specialized in Hyparrhenia
- Thomas Arthur Cope
- Eduard Hackel, The genus Hackelochloa (Poaceae) is named for him.
- A. S. Hitchcock, edited and distributed two exsiccatae, namely Plants of Kansas and American grasses
- Joseph Dalton Hooker, There are number (at least 30) of plants with specific name hookeri and hookeriana Many of them are named in honor of Joseph Dalton Hooker. Including Banksia hookeriana, Grevillea hookeriana, Iris hookeriana, Polygonatum hookeri, Tainia hookeriana an orchid species in Southern Taiwan. and Sarcococca hookeriana, others include land snail Notodiscus hookeri and Phocarctos hookeri
- Charles Edward Hubbard, was considered "the world authority on the classification and recognition of grasses" in his time.
- Robert B. Shaw
- Otto Stapf, wrote on the Graminae in William Turner Thiselton Dyer's edition of the Flora capensis (1898–1900) and published Stapfiella, which is a genus of flowering plants from Tropical Africa belonging to the family Passifloraceae and named in his honour.
- Ernst Gottlieb von Steudel
- George Vasey, granted an honorary M.A. in 1864 from Illinois Wesleyan University. In 1869 he was made a fellow of the American Association for the Advancement of Science, and in 1892, of the American Academy of Arts and Sciences; that same year he was representative to the 1892 International Botanical Congress in Genoa, where he was a vice-president.
- Jan-Frits Veldkar
