= The Cook Report =

ITV current affairs television programme (1987–1999)

- Cook report opening credits.
- Created by: Roger Cook
- Presented by: Roger Cook
- Theme music composer: Darren S-Pullman
- Country of origin: United Kingdom
- Original language: English
- No. of episodes: 118 plus 8 x 60 minute specials

Production
- Producers: Clive Entwistle, Peter Salkeld, Paul Calverley, Howard Foster, Tim Tate, David Warren & Steve Warr
- Editor: Mike Townson
- Running time: 25 mins (excluding advertisements)
- Production company: Central Independent Television

Original release
- Network: ITV
- Release: 22 July 1987 – 24 August 1999

The Cook Report is a British current affairs television programme, produced by Central Independent Television for ITV. It was presented by Roger Cook and was broadcast from 22 July 1987 to 24 August 1999, running for sixteen series. The series featured Cook investigating corruption, criminals, government social policy failures, and unmasking coverups due to incompetence, negligence and dishonesty. The series was well known for Cook's reporting style where he would present those being investigated with the evidence that the show had collected; often this would result in Cook being attacked (and sometimes injured) by those he confronted.

== History ==
Over 12 years, and sixteen series, the programme featured Roger Cook travelling the world to investigate serious criminal activity, injustice and official incompetence. During its ground-breaking undercover 'stings', Cook confronted targets, and he and the film crew sometimes suffered verbal and physical abuse. The Cook Report was by some margin the highest rated current affairs programme on British television, with audiences peaking at more than 12 million. It was credited with helping to achieve numerous criminal convictions and a number of changes in the law.

Amongst the many subjects tackled, the programme exposed Northern Ireland protection rackets, baby trading in Brazil and Guatemala, canned hunting in South Africa, loan sharks, the ivory trade, people smuggling, drug dealing, timeshare fraud (which saw Graham Maynard and John Palmer brought to justice), mock auctions, counterfeit consumer goods, manipulation of the UK singles chart, war criminals in Bosnia, Clenbuterol in British Beef, friendly fire in the Gulf War, the illegal trading of exotic birds, the rise of triads in Britain, Neo-Nazis in Germany, the Hillsborough disaster, steroid dealing, cot deaths, child and computer pornography, the Russian black market in weapons-grade plutonium, and Satanic ritual abuse.

In July 1990, the show investigated the tainted blood scandal focusing on how haemophiliacs had become infected with HIV by using contaminated blood products. In total, some 1,243 people in the UK were infected with HIV through using these products. At the time of the show, some 100 had died of AIDS; as of 2017, the total number of those who have died who were infected with HIV is closer to 1,000. Since the show aired, the scandal has roared on and continues to be debated in the British parliament as victims and their families still fight for justice.

=== "You Can Do Magic" ===
In 1997, Debbie Currie, daughter of Edwina Currie, "covered" a version of Limmie & Family Cookin's "You Can Do Magic", with Sinitta providing her vocals. To promote the single, she toured Scotland with pop band The Mojams, claimed that she had enjoyed group sex and lost her virginity at fifteen, told her mother Edwina about the latter in Tesco, and posed with fried eggs on her breasts. Edwina used an interview after her 1997 United Kingdom general election defeat to promote the song. The song was released on 19 May 1997 on Barry Tomes' Gotham Records and was pulled three days later. Credited to "Mojams featuring Debbie Currie", the song charted at number 86 on the UK singles chart. Later that month, it was revealed that the single had been part of a ruse by The Cook Report to investigate the practice of chart-rigging. Currie was chosen for the ruse because of her tabloid history, and was in fact a trainee journalist. The track was withdrawn because the programme's budget ran out.

=== Cook Report Specials ===
The Cook Report ran regularly each year for once a year until 1993 when Central began airing two seven-part series until 1997, when the programme reached its 122nd edition. It was then replaced by a number of hour-long Cook Report Specials including:

- Doctors From Hell (24 August 1999)
- Locks, Stocks, Burglars and Fences (23 April 1999)
- The Dodgy Motor Show (3 December 1998)
- The Antiques Rogue Show (19 August 1998)
- Children in Danger (1 November 1995)
- Arkan (27 October 1992) (pre-1997)
- Where did the Money Go? part 1 (5 March 1990)
- The Devil's Work (17 July 1989) (pre-1997)
- Coming Home (12 July 1988)

=== Cancellation ===
The Cook Report came to an end in 1999 when ITV, which had previously cancelled a number of current affairs programmes made for the channel (including World in Action), was faced with dwindling budgets and had concentrated on other kinds of programming. The ITV Network Centre decided to concentrate its current affairs efforts on Tonight – which, though it attracted fewer viewers, was said to be significantly less costly to make. Cook went on to work on other projects and is also Emeritus Visiting Professor at the Centre for Broadcasting and Journalism at Nottingham Trent University. He was made an honorary Doctor of Letters in 2004.

The programme did return for a one-off, 90-minute special, Roger Cook's Greatest Hits, on 30 October 2007 to celebrate the show's 20th anniversary. This update episode was produced by ITV Productions and Interesting Films.

== News of the World allegations ==
In February and April 2000, the News of the World published a series of front page allegations claiming that The Cook Report had faked a number of programmes in which crimes were set up for him to solve. Roger Cook and members of the relevant production teams issued writs for libel, against the paper. The newspaper demanded an investigation by the then regulator, the Independent Television Commission, after it sent its dossier of evidence about the programme which, after an eighteen-month investigation, in October 2001, exonerated the programme.

The News of the World initially dismissed the commission's findings as 'a whitewash', but after key witnesses for the defence had voluntarily retracted their paid-for testimony, the News of the World reluctantly had to agree with the ITC's conclusions and made the following statement to that effect in open court:

"The News of the World accepts that neither Mr Cook nor Carlton [TV] nor the editors, producers, legal advisers and researchers were a party to any fakery or deception." It was also accepted that the allegations were false and should never have been published, but the subsequent short correction was printed on page 38. Mr Cook's solicitor, Ian Bloom, described the allegations as "devastating for Mr Cook both professionally and personally, while the News of the World accepts that neither Mr Cook nor Carlton nor the editors, producers, legal advisers or researchers were a party to any fakery or deception. While it is accepted that the NoW believed that it had grounds to look into the matter, the News of the World now acknowledges that the articles contained material inaccuracies which should not have been published,"

== Awards ==
The programme and its production team won eleven national and international awards, culminating in a British Academy of Film & Television Arts (BAFTA) special award for Roger Cook in 1997 'for 25 years of outstanding quality investigative reporting.
