= Edwina Currie =

Former British politician, broadcaster and writer

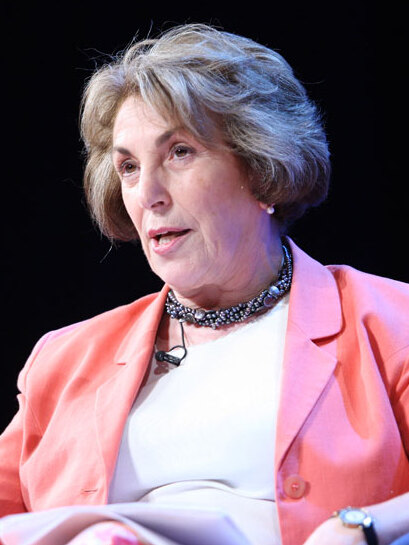
- Edwina Currie in 2014

Parliamentary Under-Secretary of State for Health
- In office 10 September 1986 – 16 December 1988
- Prime Minister: Margaret Thatcher
- Preceded by: John Major
- Succeeded by: Roger Freeman

Member of Parliament for South Derbyshire
- In office 9 June 1983 – 8 April 1997
- Preceded by: Constituency established
- Succeeded by: Mark Todd

Personal details
- Born: Edwina Cohen; 13 October 1946 (age 80) Liverpool, England
- Party: Conservative
- Spouses: Ray Currie (m. 1972; div. 2001); John Jones (m. 2001; died 2020)
- Children: 2, including Debbie Currie
- Education: University of Oxford (MA); London School of Economics (MA)
- Website: www.edwinacurrie.co.uk

Edwina Currie (née Cohen; born 13 October 1946) is a British writer, broadcaster and former politician, serving as Conservative Party Member of Parliament for South Derbyshire from 1983 until 1997. She was a Junior Health Minister for two years, resigning in 1988 during the salmonella-in-eggs controversy.

By the time Currie lost her seat as an MP in 1997, she had begun a new career as a novelist and broadcaster. She is the author of six novels, and has also written four works of non-fiction. In September 2002, the publication of Currie's Diaries (1987–92) caused a sensation, as they revealed a four-year affair with colleague (and later Prime Minister) John Major between 1984 and 1988. Currie's record as Junior Health Minister was heavily scrutinised in the 2010s, and to a lesser extent at the time, for her decision to appoint Jimmy Savile as chairman of Broadmoor Psychiatric Hospital, where it is now known he molested and raped mentally unstable patients. Currie previously expressed her "full confidence" in him.

Currie remains an outspoken public figure, with a reputation for being "highly opinionated", and currently earns her living as an author and media personality.

== Early life and education ==
Currie was born in south Liverpool to an Orthodox Jewish family, who "disowned her when she married a non-Jewish accountant". She is not particularly religious, stating in a February 2000 interview that she found "religious mumbo jumbo hard to swallow in any faith". She was educated at the Liverpool Institute High School for Girls in Blackburne House, in the Canning area of Liverpool.

Currie studied philosophy, politics and economics (PPE) at the University of Oxford, where she was an undergraduate student at St Anne's College, Oxford, and was a scholar. She was taught by Gabriele Taylor. Subsequently, she gained a Master of Science (MSc) degree in economic history from the London School of Economics.

== Career ==
From 1975 until 1986, Currie served as a Birmingham City Councillor for Northfield. In 1983, she stood for parliament as a Conservative Party candidate, and was elected as the member for South Derbyshire. Frequently outspoken, she was described as "a virtually permanent fixture on the nation's TV screen saying something outrageous about just about anything" and "the most outspoken and sexually interested woman of her political generation."

In September 1986, she became a Junior Health Minister. Among her comments over the next two years were that "Good Christian people who would not dream of misbehaving will not catch AIDS", that elderly people should wrap up warm in winter and that northerners die of "ignorance and chips".

Currie's record as Junior Health Minister was heavily scrutinised in the 2010s, and to a lesser extent at the time, for her decision in 1988 to appoint Jimmy Savile as chairman of Broadmoor Psychiatric Hospital, where it is now known he molested and raped mentally unstable patients. Currie previously expressed her "full confidence" in him. Savile had been given extraordinary power and a set of keys with complete access to every part of the hospital. He mingled repeatedly with the 800 or so patients, many teenage girls, some severely disturbed and medicated. In 2012, after Savile's death, a police investigation concluded that he had been one of Britain's most prolific sex offenders.

=== Salmonella-in-eggs controversy ===
Currie was forced to resign as Parliamentary Under-Secretary of State for Health in December 1988, after she issued a warning about salmonella in British eggs. The statement that "most of the egg production in this country, sadly, is now affected with salmonella" sparked outrage among farmers and egg producers, and caused egg sales in the country to decline rapidly, by 60 percent. The controversy gained her the nickname "Eggwina".

The loss of revenue led to the slaughter of four million hens. Although the statement was widely interpreted as referring to "most eggs produced", in fact it related to the egg production flock; there was indeed evidence that a mid-1980s regulation change had allowed salmonella to get a hold in flocks.

Long after the furore died down, in 2001, it was revealed that a covered-up Whitehall report produced months after Currie's resignation found that there had been a "salmonella epidemic of considerable proportions".

=== Post-ministerial career as an MP ===
In 1991, Currie became the first Conservative MP to appear on the BBC topical panel show Have I Got News for You. She appeared again two years later, in a special episode commemorating the release of Margaret Thatcher's memoirs, opposite fellow Liverpudlian (and Liverpool Institute alumnus) Derek Hatton.

During the 1992 general election campaign, Currie poured a glass of orange juice over Labour's Peter Snape shortly after an edition of the Midlands-based television debate show Central Weekend had finished airing. Speaking about the incident later, Currie said: "I just looked at my orange juice, and looked at this man from which this stream of abuse was emanating, and thought 'I know how to shut you up.'"

After the 1992 general election, she declined a request from Prime Minister John Major to take up a position as Minister of State for the Home Office.

In February 1994, Currie, a member of the Tory Campaign for Homosexual Equality (TORCHE), tabled an amendment to the Criminal Justice and Public Order Bill to lower the age of consent for male homosexual sexual acts from 21 to 16, which would mean an equal age of consent with opposite-sex couples if it passed. This amendment was defeated by 307 votes to 280, although a subsequent amendment resulted in the reduction of the age of consent for male homosexual acts from 21 to 18; final equalisation with an age of consent at 16 was voted through parliament in late 2000, becoming law in January 2001. In a speech in the House of Commons Currie said, "it is time to seize our homophobic instincts and chuck them on the scrapheap of history, where they belong".

In February 1994, Currie voted against the death penalty for murder, having previously voted and spoken in favour of it in July 1983; she had also supported it in June 1988 and December 1990.

In June 1994, she contested the European Parliament seat of Bedfordshire and Milton Keynes, but lost the seat to Labour's Eryl McNally by 94,837 votes to 61,628 votes. Currie was MP for South Derbyshire for 14 years; however, along with many other Conservative MPs, she lost her parliamentary seat in the 1997 general election. Shortly before Election Day she publicly predicted a huge Labour majority and said the Conservative Party was heading for a "bloodbath."

=== After Parliament ===
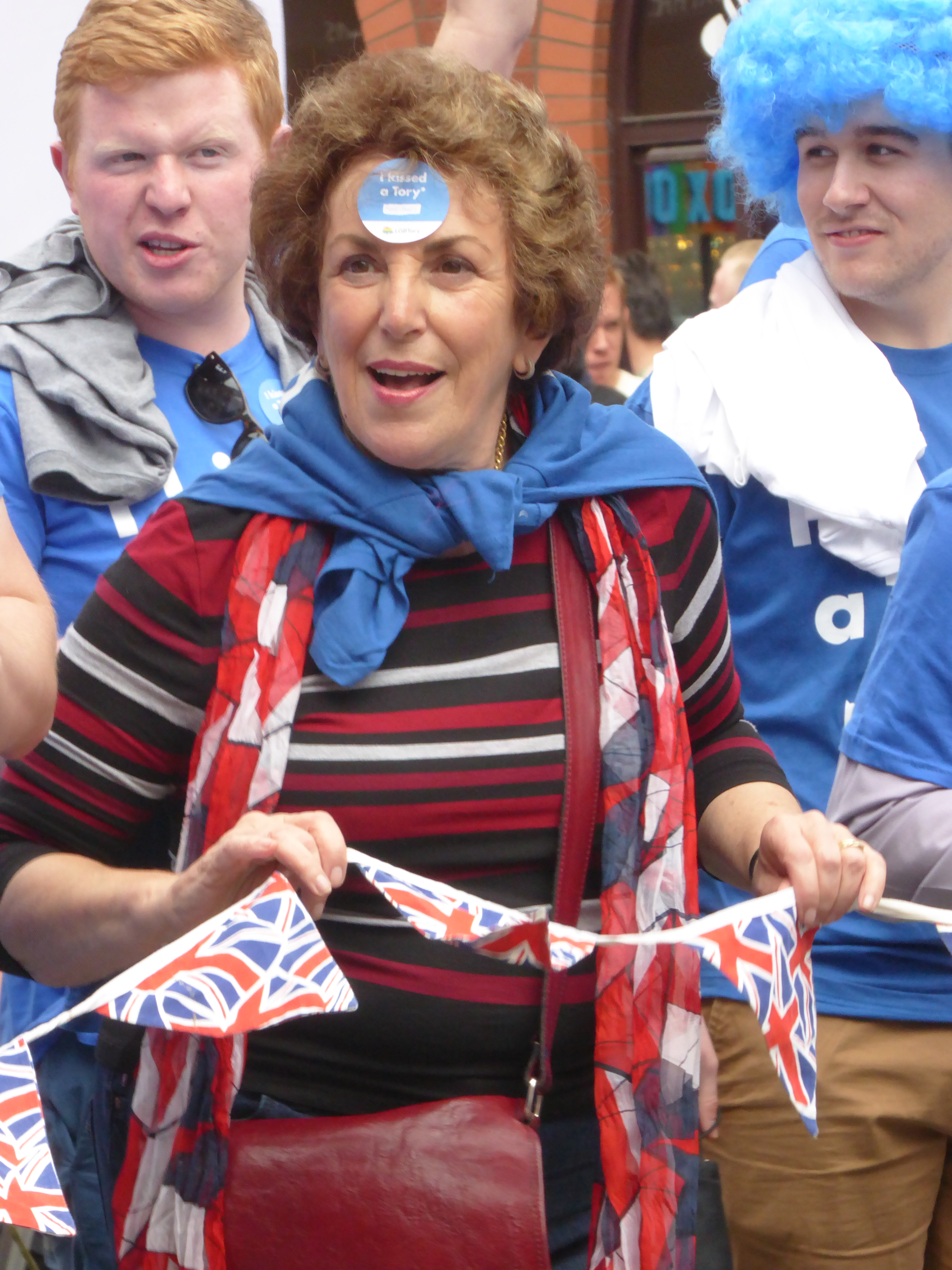
Currie at Manchester Pride, August 2016

Currie attempted to be selected as a Conservative candidate for the European Parliament election of 1999, but was unsuccessful.

After nearly a quarter of a century away from politics, it was announced in February 2021 that Currie would contest her home ward of Whaley Bridge on Derbyshire County Council at that year's local elections. She was challenging the incumbent, Ruth George of the Labour Party. The race was notable for pitting two former MPs against one another in an election for a council seat. On 7 May, it was announced that Currie had failed in her bid to win the marginal seat, receiving 1,878 votes to George's 2,544.

In October 2022, Currie described the prime minister, Liz Truss, as "charmless, graceless, brainless, and useless".

=== Novels ===
Currie has written six novels: A Parliamentary Affair (1994), A Woman's Place (1996), She's Leaving Home (1997), The Ambassador (1999), Chasing Men (2000) and This Honourable House (2001). She has also written four works of non-fiction: Life Lines (1989), What Women Want (1990), Three Line Quips (1992) and Diaries 1987–92 (2002).

=== Media ===
From the time she lost her seat in 1997, Currie has maintained a presence in the media. From 1998 to 2003, she hosted a late evening talk show on BBC Radio 5 Live, Late Night Currie. In 2002, she moved to HTV, presenting the television programme Currie Night until 2003. Since then, she has appeared in a string of reality television programmes, such as Wife Swap in which she and her second husband John swapped places with John McCririck and his wife, Jenny. Currie appeared on a charity edition of the television quiz show Who Wants to Be a Millionaire? on 17 September 2005, partnering Conservative speech-writer and lobbyist Derek Laud. She has also appeared in the reality cooking show Hell's Kitchen with celebrity chef Gordon Ramsay in 2004, and Celebrity Stars in Their Eyes in 2006.

Currie was interviewed about the rise of Thatcherism for the 2006 BBC TV documentary series Tory! Tory! Tory! She was the first woman to win Celebrity Mastermind on 23 June 2004, specialising in the life of Marie Curie. She also won All Star Family Fortunes on 3 January 2009. She appeared in Channel 4's Come Dine with Me in February 2009 where she finished third. She made a second appearance on the show during Channel 4's "Alternative Election Night" coverage, with Rod Liddle, Brian Paddick and Derek Hatton as her competitors. She also appeared in James May's Show James May's Toy Stories where she helped him build a bridge made entirely out of Meccano in Liverpool.

In September 2011, Currie took part in the ninth series of Strictly Come Dancing. She was paired with professional dancer Vincent Simone. On 9 October, she and Simone were the first couple to be eliminated from the competition.

In November 2014, Currie took part in the fourteenth series of I'm a Celebrity...Get Me Out of Here! entering the jungle on Day 5 of the competition, and finishing in fourth place. In 2020, she trekked the Sultans Trail for BBC Two's Pilgrimage: Road to Istanbul.

=== Discography ===
As part of the 2009 TV Show Ant & Dec's Saturday Night Takeaway, Currie teamed up with Declan Donnelly and two other celebrities to release a cover version of the Wham! hit song "Wake Me Up Before You Go Go".

Year	Single	Chart positions	Album
Year	Single	UK	Album
2009	"Wake Me Up Before You Go-Go"	64	–

== Personal life ==
On 1 July 1972, Edwina married accountant Ray Currie in Barnstaple, Devon. They had two children, including Debbie. Currie and her husband separated in 1997, but did not finalise their divorce until 2001. During that marriage, between 1984 and 1988, Currie had a four-year affair with John Major, later Prime Minister, which she revealed in September 2002. Edwina and Ray were the subject of an edition of the BBC's The Other Half documentary series, broadcast on 14 March 1984.

While she was MP for South Derbyshire, Currie lived in a windmill (converted to a house) in Findern, built in 1715 and the oldest surviving windmill structure in the East Midlands.

On 24 May 2001, in Southwark, Currie married retired Detective Superintendent John Jones, whom she had met when he was a guest on her radio programme in 1999. Jones died on 1 November 2020.

Currie lives in Whaley Bridge, Derbyshire.

=== Affair with John Major ===
Currie's Diaries (1987–92), published in 2002, caused a sensation, as they revealed a four-year affair with John Major between 1984 and 1988, while both were married to other people. The affair started while she was a backbencher and Major was the government whip in Margaret Thatcher's government. After Major's promotion to Chief Secretary to the Treasury, the relationship ended, but the two remained friends. Currie apparently ceased the affair when it became dangerous and impractical owing to the presence of bodyguards who had to be avoided.

After publication, Major made a statement saying that he was ashamed of the affair and had privately revealed the matter to his wife. Currie said she had been in love with him for years after the end of the affair, and that he had been "the love of her life". However, only weeks after revealing the affair, she publicly criticised Major, accusing him of sidelining female and black politicians and of being "one of the less competent prime ministers".

The admission came after years of denial of any affair while in office and a successful libel action against playwright David Hare, who had said a sexually voracious murderer played by Charlotte Rampling in his film Paris by Night (1988) was an "Edwina Currie-like" figure. Currie had also produced several novels with explicitly erotic content – and political background – such as A Parliamentary Affair. Following publication of her diaries, Express Newspapers lawyers re-examined documents in a libel case to see if there was anything in the diaries which would allow them to reopen the case and recoup damages. In March 2000, Currie had been awarded £30,000 against them following a 1997 article entitled "How Edwina is now the vilest lady in Britain."

=== Charity and other interests ===
In September 2004, Currie took part in a sponsored cycle ride across Poland, near to the area where ancestors of hers lived, for Marie Curie Cancer Care.

In June 2005, in her role as a patron of the British Heart Foundation, Currie championed a campaign to raise awareness of the effect of heart disease on women. In May 2007, the patient charity MRSA Action UK announced Currie as their patron. Edwina Currie was quoted by the media championing the campaign against hospital superbugs.

In October 2011, Currie took part in EuroVoice, an event supported by the European Youth Parliament. In November 2011, Currie accepted the position of President of the Tideswell Male Voice Choir.

In February 2013, Currie participated in an Oxford Union debate, saying she opposed feminism.

Parliament of the United Kingdom
New constituency	Member of Parliament for South Derbyshire; 1983–1997	Succeeded by Mark Todd
