= Mary Agnes Chase =

American botanist (1869–1963)

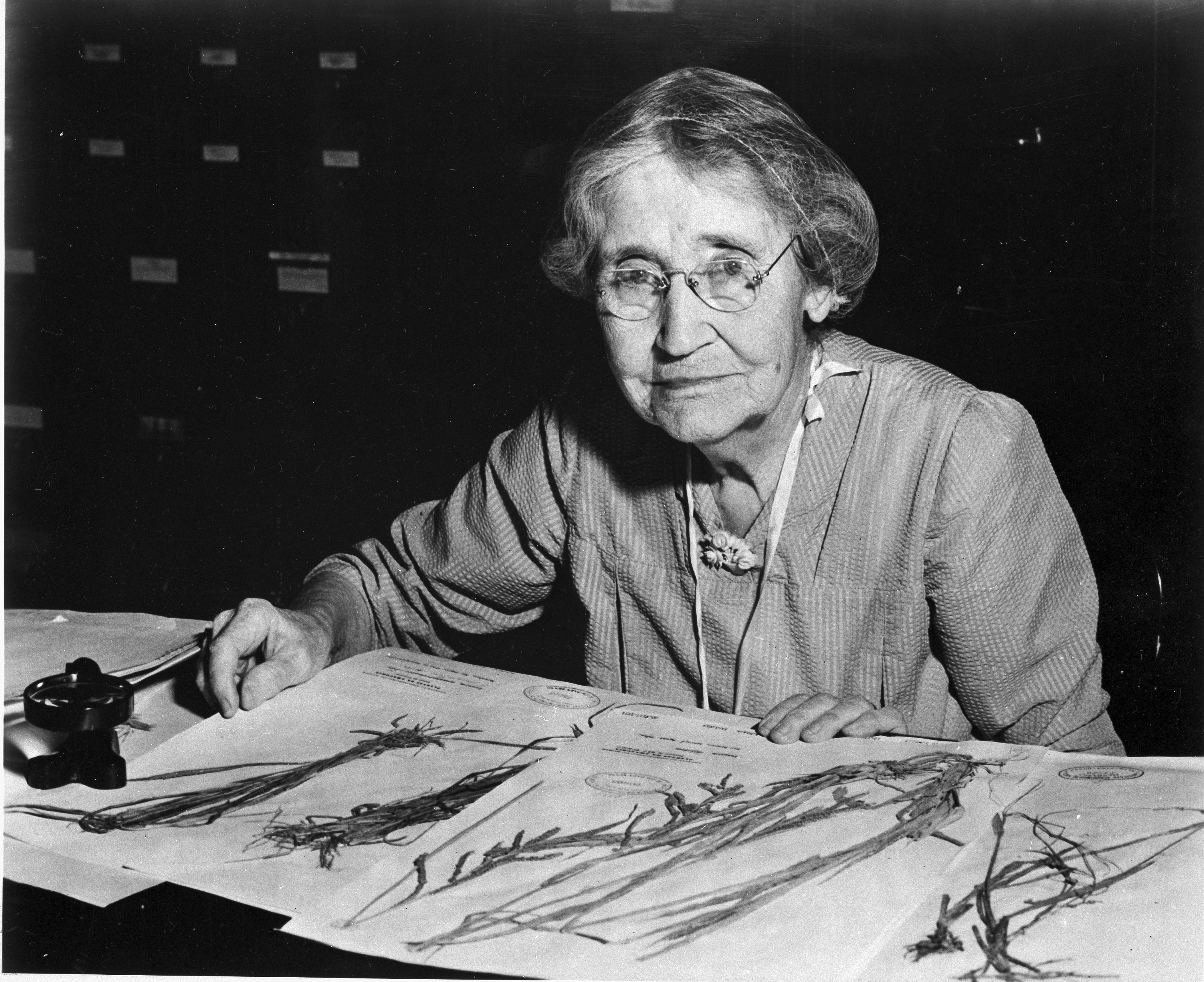
- Mary Agnes Chase seated at a desk with herbarium sheets, c.1960
- Born: April 29, 1869; Iroquois County, Illinois, US
- Died: September 24, 1963 (aged 94); Bethesda, Maryland, US
- Resting place: Rosehill Cemetery; 41.989006°N 87.679244°W
- Other name: Agnes Chase
- Known for: First Book of Grasses
- Spouse: William Ingraham Chase
- Scientific career
- Fields: botany, botanical illustration
- Workplaces: U.S. Department of Agriculture, Smithsonian Institution
- Author abbrev. (botany): Chase

Mary Agnes Chase (April 29, 1869 – September 24, 1963) was an American botanist who specialized in agrostology, the study of grasses. Although lacking formal education past elementary school, Chase was able to rise through the ranks as a botanist at the United States Department of Agriculture, beginning as an illustrator under the tutelage of Albert Spear Hitchcock, and eventually becoming a senior botanist, overseeing the USDA's Systematic Agrostology department. Chase conducted fieldwork abroad in Europe and South America and published several books, including the First Book of Grasses: The Structure of Grasses Explained for Beginners, which was later translated into Spanish and Portuguese. Chase was recognized for her work as an agrostologist with numerous awards, including a Certificate of Merit issued by the Botanical Society of America in 1956. An active suffragist, she took part in demonstrations organized by the Silent Sentinels, a group established by members of the National Woman's Party. Although Chase's participation in this movement was not always well received by her peers in the scientific community, she remained committed to the cause of women's suffrage.

== Life and early career ==
Mary Agnes Meara was born on April 29 1869, in rural Iroquois County, Illinois but moved to Chicago several years later following the death by lynching of her father (an Irish railway worker named Martin John Meara, accused of killing his 11 year old son), at which point the family changed their last name to Merrill. Mary Agnes was the third of six children and, upon moving to Chicago, was raised by her mother, Mary Brannick Meara, and maternal grandmother. Although Chase attended school as a child, her formal education ended after she completed elementary school. On January 21, 1888, she married William Ingraham Chase. He was the grandson of Bishop Philander Chase, who became the guardian of his brother's son, Salmon P. Chase, former Governor of Ohio, US Senator, US Secretary of the Treasury and 6th Chief Justice of the Supreme Court. Her husband died a year after their marriage.

She was working as a proofreader for Inter-Ocean Newspaper and taking botany courses offered by the University of Chicago when she was hired by E.J. Hill to do illustrations for his publications. Through her collaboration with Hill, Chase's illustrations became visible to a wider audience, including Charles Frederick Millspaugh, who hired her to do illustrations for the Field Museum of Natural History in Chicago. In 1903, Chase began working as an illustrator in the Division of Agrostology at the U.S. Department of Agriculture in Washington, D.C., and spent her first two years there in the Division of Forage Plants. Beginning in 1905 Chase worked under the instruction of Albert Spear Hitchcock who, after observing Chase's skill as an illustrator, came to regard her as his collaborator instead of his mentee.

In 1910 and 1915 Chase and Hitchcock coauthored two works on North American species of grasses from the genus Panicum, and in 1917 they released Grasses of the West Indies, which drew heavily on Chase's fieldwork in Puerto Rico four years earlier. In 1911, Hitchcock participated in the biological survey of the Panama Canal zone, a trip sponsored by the Smithsonian Institution. After Hitchcock returned from this expedition he requested that the remaining $54 of his grant be given to Chase to help fund her own fieldwork. This request was denied by a Smithsonian official who responded, "I doubt the advisability of engaging the services of a woman for the purpose [of the expedition]."

== Mary and the Women's Suffrage Movement ==
While "Chase's power within her institution was at times undermined by her own political activities," she believed it was essential to address gender discrimination if it was negatively impacting a woman's ability to achieve success both socially and professionally. Chase was forced to disregard the potential damage that her support for women's rights could have on her career as a respected agrostologist in order to succeed as a legitimate advocate for the cause.

As an active suffragist, Mary Agnes Chase took part in a series of demonstrations led by the Silent Sentinels, members of the National Woman's Party (NWP) who wanted President Wilson to listen to what women had to say about the vote. These "Silent Sentinels" attempted to infiltrate the White House in every way possible; 300 delegates were sent to meet with the President to discuss the need for a Federal suffrage amendment; Women unfurled a banner saying "Votes for Women" down into the White House gallery while in the attendance of a House of Representatives meeting; Pickets took place at every entrance of the White House gates, with signs and banners reading "What Will You Do for Woman Suffrage?" and "Mr. President, How Long Will Women Have to Wait for Liberty?". Each day was themed so that women from all walks of life could be represented in the suffragist demonstration; There were State Days for women to represent their states, and Professional Days for women to represent their fields of study, such as law, science, and journalism. The "Silent Sentinels" meant to hold out indefinitely until a compromise could be reached, and while other women's suffrage organizations like the National American Woman Suffrage Association believed their actions to be too militaristic, many empathizers of the movement donated money towards the continuation of the picketing and demonstrations, raising over $3000 in total. Chase herself publicly vowed to burn any publication of President Wilson's that used words such as "liberty" and "freedom" until women were given suffrage. In response to these demonstrations, many women in the NWP were arrested and sent to workhouses, with Paul and Chase included. When it was made public that these women had undergone force-feeding after going on a hunger strike in the workhouses, more support was thrown towards the suffragist cause and this sympathy from the public ultimately released Paul, Chase and others arrested from the workhouses. The persistence shown by the NWP played a major role in influencing the ratification of the Suffrage Amendment in 1919 and 19th Amendment in 1920.

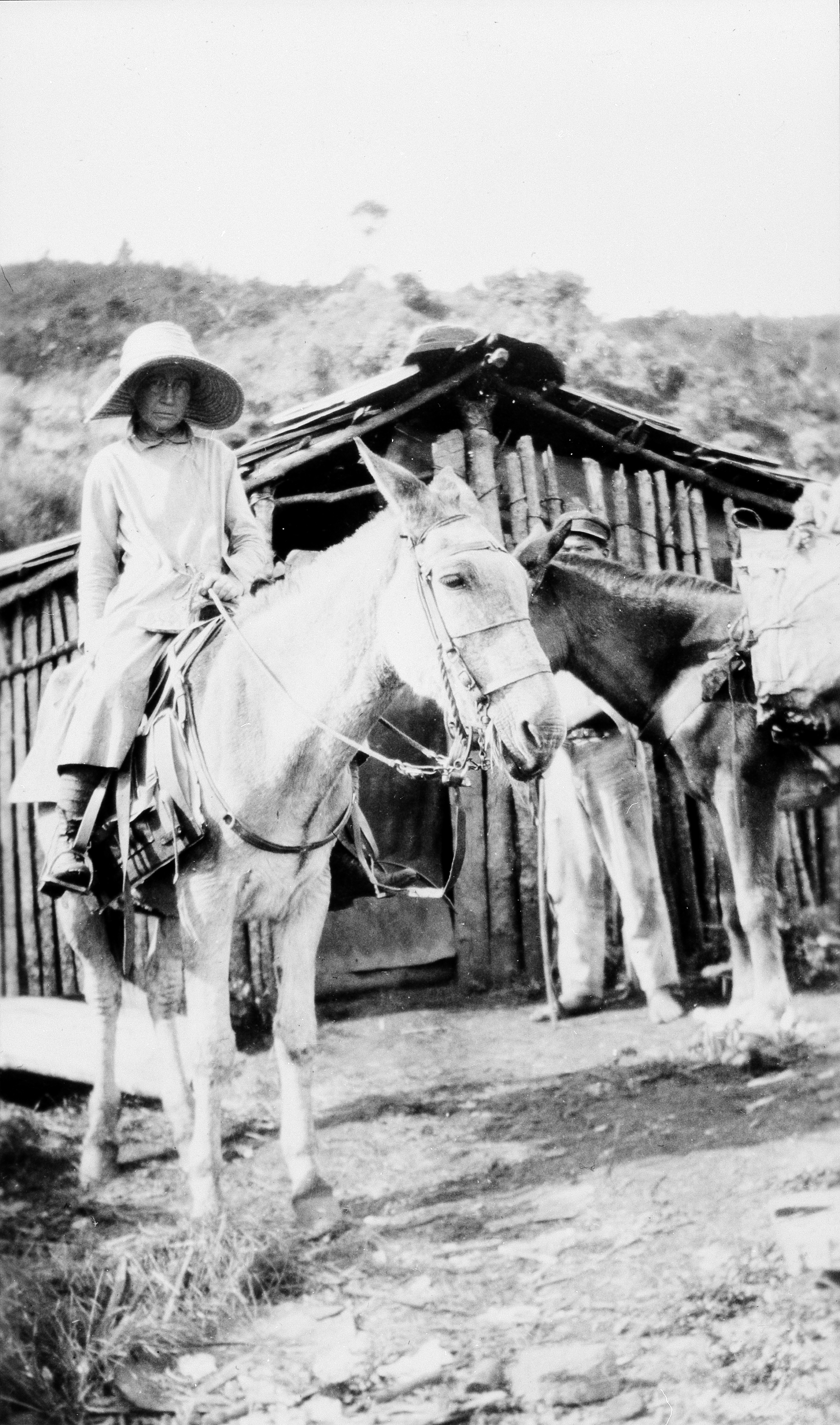
Mary Agnes Chase in Brazil, 1929

== International fieldwork and later career ==
Chase's grave at Rosehill Cemetery

In 1922 Chase published her First Book of Grasses: The Structure of Grasses Explained for Beginners. As its title suggests, this book was not meant for professional botanists, but rather for the "serious but amateur student." The same year that her First Book of Grasses was published, Chase conducted botanical research abroad at various herbaria, traveling across western Europe. She visited the Hackel Herbarium in the National History Museum of Vienna, and collaborated with Eduard Hackel to collect alpine grass specimens. In 1923 she became an assistant botanist at the U.S. Department of Agriculture, and was promoted again in 1925, this time becoming an associate botanist.

In 1924 Chase conducted fieldwork in Brazil, a trip funded by several organizations including the U.S. Department of Agriculture and the Field Museum in Chicago (where Chase worked in the early twentieth century). Of the approximately 20,000 plant species that Chase collected in Brazil, 500 of them were grasses and, when Chase returned to Brazil again in 1929, she collected ten new varieties of grasses. In Brazil Chase was able to work with Brazilian botanists such as Maria do Carmo Bandeira, expanding the network of female botanists on whom she could rely. In anticipation of her travels to Latin America, Chase contacted American female missionaries stationed there who hosted her, thus supporting her international fieldwork in ways that American scientific institutions would not. Chase often funded her own fieldwork, although the specimens she documented and collected became the property of the National Herbarium. Her trips to Brazil and thousands of specimens retrieved earned her the affectionate nickname of "Uncle Sam's chief woman explorer of the USDA".

In 1935 Chase and Hitchcock published another book, titled Manual of the Grasses of the United States which, due to its popularity, was reprinted eight times by 1938. In 1936 she was promoted to the role of senior botanist and became responsible for the USDA's entire Systematic Agrostology department. Three years later, Chase retired from the USDA after 36 years of employment. In 1940 she was invited by the Venezuelan government to conduct fieldwork there. As with her second Brazil trip, in Venezuela Chase found eleven native grass species that were previously unknown.

After Chase's retirement from the U.S. Department of Agriculture in 1939, she maintained her role as custodian of grasses at the U.S. National Herbarium (a position she held until her death in 1963) and was thought to be the "foremost grass specialist in the world." Beginning in 1941 Chase acted as a mentor and instructor for George Black, an American botanist working in Brazil. Black would collect plant specimens for Chase, who would send back "plant identifications, specimens, publications, and advice." To help support women in their scientific research, Chase traveled to South America, Canada and the Philippines, acting as "a liberal and supportive mentor, one who [encouraged] independence and [needed] little control over her students," and also opened up her home to young women in need of a place to stay while completing their studies in the United States. One of these women was Zoraida Luces, who Chase met in Brazil. Luces traveled to Washington D.C., studied there under Chase's instruction, and would later translate Chase's First Book of Grasses into Spanish. Chase received several awards and honors, including, in 1956, a Certificate of Merit awarded by the Botanical Society of America. In 1958, Chase received her only college degree, an honorary Doctor of Science awarded by the University of Illinois, and became the eighth Honorary Fellow of the Smithsonian Institution. In 1961, (two years before her death) she became a Fellow at the Linnean Society of London.

She died in Bethesda, Maryland on September 24, 1963, and was buried at Rosehill Cemetery in Chicago.

== Botanical collections ==
Chase's botanical collections are held in numerous herbaria around the world, including the United States National Herbarium, National Herbarium of Victoria at the Royal Botanic Gardens Victoria, the University of Michigan Herbarium, the Gray Herbarium within the Harvard University Herbaria, the Swedish Museum of Natural History and the herbarium at the Royal Botanic Gardens, Kew.

== Mentioned awards and honors ==
- 1956, Certificate of Merit from the Botanical Society of America
- 1958, Honorary doctorate from the University of Illinois
- 1958, Honorary fellowship of the Smithsonian Institution
- 1961, Fellow from the Linnean Society of London

== Mentioned publications ==
- 1915, Hitchcock, A. S. & A. Chase. Tropical North American species of Panicum. Washington: Government Printing Office. OCLC 3315926.
- 1917, Hitchcock, A. S. & A. Chase. Grasses of the West Indies. Washington: Government Printing Office. https://doi.org/10.5962/bhl.title.53799.
- 1922, Chase, A. First book of grasses: The structure of grasses explained for beginners. New York: The Macmillan Company. OCLC 0970694.
- 1951, Chase, A. & A. S. Hitchcock. Manual of the grasses of the United States, Second Edition. Washington, DC: U.S. Department of Agriculture. OCLC 1461602
