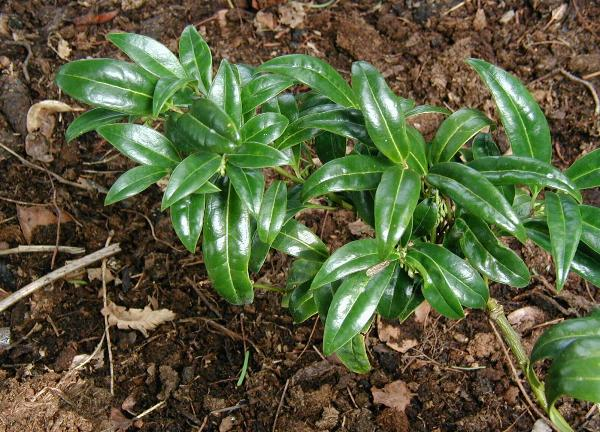
- Sarcococca humilis

Scientific classification
- Kingdom: Plantae
- Clade: Tracheophytes
- Clade: Angiosperms
- Clade: Eudicots
- Order: Buxales
- Family: Buxaceae
- Genus: Sarcococca; Lindl.

Species
- See text

= Sarcococca =

Genus of flowering plants

Sarcococca, nicknamed sweet box or Christmas box, is a genus of flowering plants in the family Buxaceae. native to eastern and southeastern Asia, and the Himalayas, with one species native to Central America. They are slow-growing, monoecious, evergreen shrubs 1–2 m (3–7 ft) tall. The leaves are borne alternately, 3–12 cm long and 1–4 cm broad.

== Distribution and habitat ==
As of January 2025, the genus Sarcococca contains 15 accepted species. The genus is predominantly native to Asia, with more than half of the Sarcococca species native to China, however one species (Sarcococca conzattii) is native to southern Mexico (Oaxaca) and Guatemala.

== Physical characteristics ==
The plants bear fragrant white flowers, often in winter. The fruit is a red or black drupe containing 1–3 seeds. Some species are cultivated as groundcover or low hedging in moist, shady areas. The basic chromosome number for the genus is 14 (2n = 28).

== Name origin ==
The genus name Sarcococca comes from the Greek σάρξ (sárx) and κόκκος (kókkos) for "fleshy berry", referring to the black fruit.

== Selected species ==
- Sarcococca confusa Sealy – Sweet box
- Sarcococca conzattii (Standl.) I.M.Johnst.
- Sarcococca hookeriana Baill.
- Sarcococca humilis Stapf
- Sarcococca longifolia M. Cheng
- Sarcococca longipetiolata M. Cheng
- Sarcococca orientalis C. Y. Wu
- Sarcococca pruniformis (Saracodine courier)
- Sarcococca ruscifolia Stapf
- Sarcococca saligna (D. Don) Mull.-Arg.
- Sarcococca vagans Stapf
- Sarcococca wallichii Stapf
- Sarcococca zeylanica Baill.
