= Roger Cook (journalist) =

British investigative journalist (1943–2026)

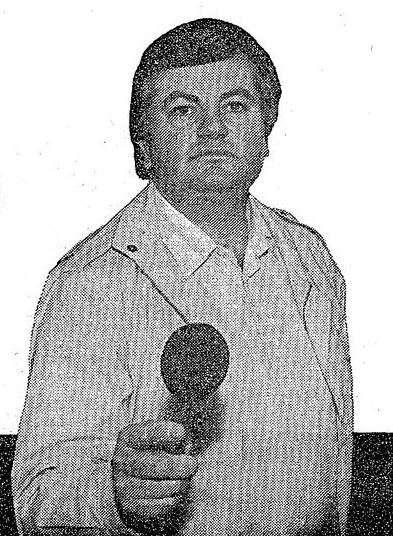
- Cook, c. 1988
- Born: Roger James Cook; 6 April 1943; Auckland, New Zealand
- Died: 13 June 2026 (aged 83); Bath, Somerset, England
- Occupations: Journalist; broadcaster
- Spouses: Madeline Koh (m. 1966; div. 1972); Frances Knox (m. 1983)
- Children: 1

Roger James Cook (6 April 1943 – 13 June 2026) was an Australian and British investigative journalist and television broadcaster. In 1998 he received a BAFTA special award "for 25 years of outstanding quality investigative reporting", for his programme The Cook Report.

== Early life ==
Cook's parents were New Zealanders. He was born in Auckland, New Zealand, but was brought up in Australia, and began his career with the Australian Broadcasting Corporation as a reporter and newsreader on both radio and television.

In 1968 Cook moved to the United Kingdom where he joined BBC Radio 4's World at One and its sister programme, The World This Weekend. He subsequently worked on several other BBC radio and television programmes, including PM, Nationwide, and Newsnight.

== Checkpoint ==
In 1973 Cook created and presented the Radio 4 programme Checkpoint, which specialised in investigating and exposing criminals, con-men, injustice and official incompetence, often confronting the subjects of the investigation on tape. In 1979 Cook was threatened by Don Arden, father of Sharon Osbourne, when he started to look into the business practices of the notorious rock manager after Cook used the legal battle between Lynsey de Paul and Arden as a springboard for his investigation. Arden told Cook, "When you fight the champion, you go 15 rounds. You've got to be prepared to go the whole way ... I'll take you with one hand strapped up my a***. You're not a man, you're a creep."

In 1981, during a Checkpoint report for Newsnight, Cook was filmed being violently assaulted by a Brighton antique dealer after confronting him about selling fake antiques. Cook suffered three cracked ribs. He later said: "Mr Harris invited me to step outside and talk things through, but his means of communication proved to be a metal bar".

In 1984 Checkpoint transferred to television for one series of four episodes, broadcast on BBC1.

== The Cook Report ==
In 1985 Cook moved from the BBC to Central Independent Television, Birmingham, and in 1986 was in charge of one series of the live debate show Central Weekend. In 1987 he launched a new TV series, The Cook Report, a higher-budget version of his radio programme, with a large and dedicated research team, which enabled it to operate on an international scale. The show became known for its filmed 'stings' and for Cook's frequent confrontations with his targets, during which he (and sometimes the film crew) often suffered verbal and physical abuse (with Cook getting injured on a number of occasions). Cook was described in the British press as "nemesis in a leisure shirt", "a cross between Meatloaf and the Equaliser", "the bravest/most beaten-up journalist in Britain" and "The Taped Crusader".

In a 1987 episode of the programme, "Worse Than The Mafia", Cook tackled Northern Ireland protection rackets. Cook posed as a business man while Ulster Defence Association man Eddie Sayers was filmed attempting to extort money from him. Sayers was later arrested and sentenced to 10 years in prison at Belfast Crown Court.

The Cook Report ran for 16 series until 1999, when it was cancelled by ITV Network Centre. In its 12 years on air The Cook Report was the highest rated current affairs programme on British television, with audiences peaking at over 12 million. In 2007, the programme returned for a 90-minute special entitled Roger Cook's Greatest Hits, in which Cook revisited and updated a number of his stories. Cook said in 2007 that he had received death threats as a result of the series. In one investigation, into pensioners being financially cheated after false threats of compulsory purchase orders, he was run over by a car. While recovering from surgery, an Australian doctor told him: "Jeez, mate. Put it this way, if you weren't built like a brick privy, you'd probably be dead."

The programme and its production team won 11 national and international awards, culminating in a British Academy of Film and Television Arts (BAFTA) special award for Cook in 1998 "for 25 years of outstanding quality investigative reporting".

== Other activities ==
Cook published several books, including an autobiography in 1999, Dangerous Ground, which was revised and updated in October 2011 as More Dangerous Ground.

He held an Emeritus Visiting Professorship at the Centre for Broadcasting and Journalism at Nottingham Trent University and was made an Honorary Doctor of Letters by the university in 2004.

== Parodies ==
Cook was parodied by comedians including Benny Hill and Reeves and Mortimer. In the 1980s, his Checkpoint series was the inspiration for a sitcom, BBC Radio 4's Delve Special, in which investigative journalist David Lander, played by Stephen Fry, doorstepped many fictional villains. When Cook's investigations moved to television, the parody followed, in Channel 4's This Is David Lander, with Tony Slattery later taking over the central role in the show. Many of Lander and Harper's investigations were based on reports made by Cook, Panorama and World in Action.

A puppet version of Cook also appeared several times on the satirical television series Spitting Image.

== Personal life and death ==
Cook was married twice: first to Madeline Koh in 1966, while he was living in Australia. The marriage ended in divorce eight years later when Cook was admitted to hospital after being struck by a lorry which broke his back and neck. He married his second wife, architect Frances Knox, in 1982; they had one daughter, born in 1985. Cook "faced a number of battles with cancer over the years" with both his prostate and his bladder.

He died in hospital on 13 June 2026, aged 83 after a long battle with cancer. His wife and daughter were at his bedside.

== Publications ==
- Cook, Roger; Tate, Tim (1988), What's Wrong with Your Rights?, Methuen, ISBN 978-0-413-54890-0
- Cook, Roger; Foster, Howard (1999), Dangerous Ground: The Inside Story of Britain's Leading Investigative Journalist, HarperCollins, ISBN 978-0-00653-108-1
- Cook, Roger; Foster, Howard (2007), More Dangerous Ground: The Inside Story of Britain's Leading Investigative Journalist, Book Guild, ISBN 978-1-84624-109-3
- Cook, Roger; Tate, Tim (2008), Roger Cook's 10 Greatest Conmen: True Stories of the World's Most Outrageous Scams, John Blake Publishing, ISBN 978-1-84454-646-6
