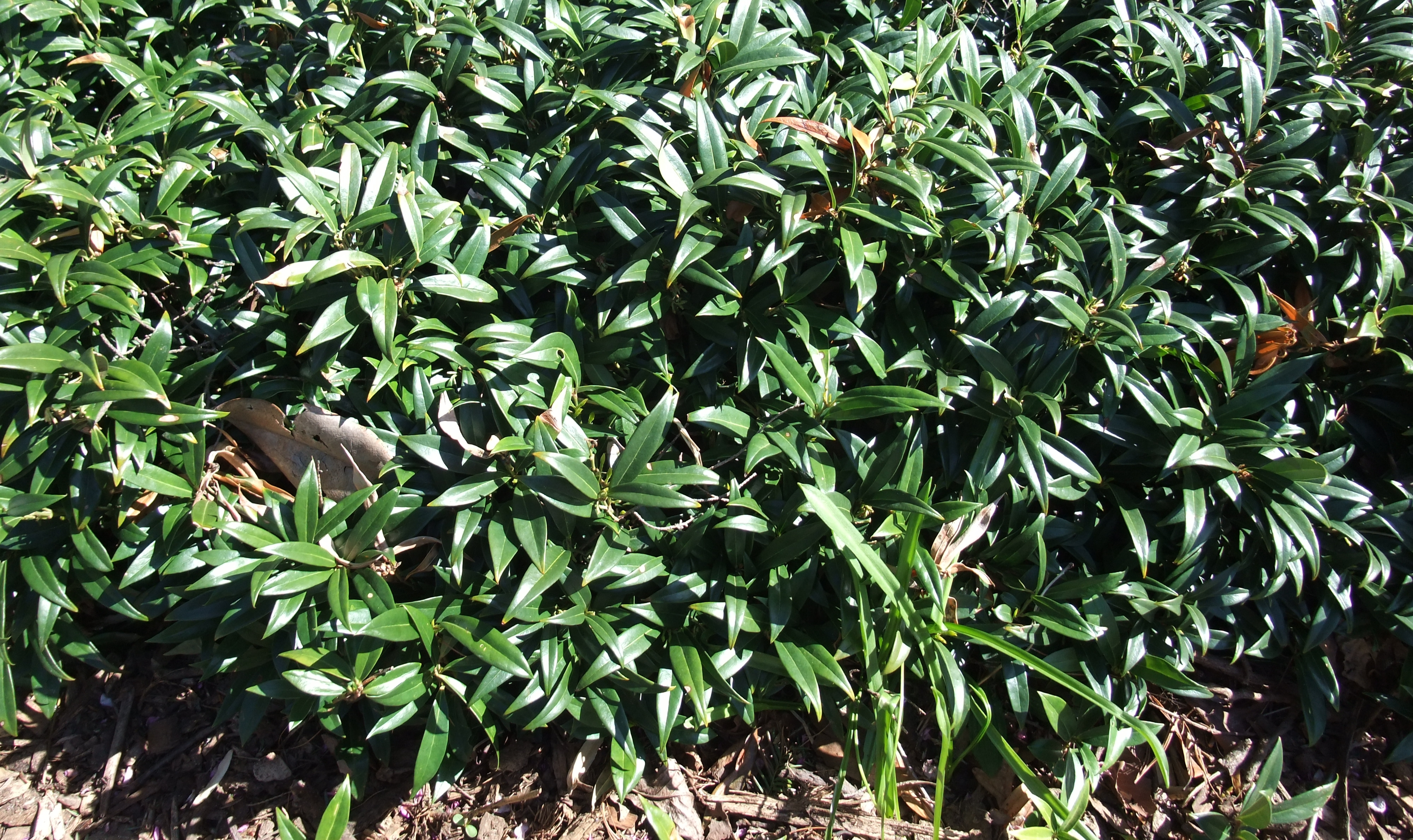

Scientific classification
- Kingdom: Plantae
- Clade: Tracheophytes
- Clade: Angiosperms
- Clade: Eudicots
- Order: Buxales
- Family: Buxaceae
- Genus: Sarcococca
- Species: S. hookeriana

Binomial name
- Sarcococca hookeriana Baill.

= Sarcococca hookeriana =

Species of flowering plant

Sarcococca hookeriana, the Himalayan sweet box, is a species of flowering plant in the box family Buxaceae, native to China, Afghanistan, North East India, Bhutan and Nepal. It is a low-growing evergreen shrub, usually growing to 12–24 in (30–61 cm) high. It produces aromatic white flowers throughout winter, followed by black berries.

Sarcococca hookeriana has several varieties of very different appearance to which different nomenclature has been applied in the references. Recent convention for example is to use Sarcococca hookeriana var. humilis for the previous Sarcococca humilis, although it has broader, shiny leaves and a different habit than other forms.

This small plant is often used as groundcover in gardens. The variety Sarcococca hookeriana var. digyna is more slender with narrower leaves. The cultivar ‘Purple Stem’ has gained the Royal Horticultural Society's Award of Garden Merit. It is fully hardy down to −15 °C (5 °F), but requires a sheltered position in full or partial shade.

== Etymology ==
The Latin specific epithet hookeriana refers to the British botanist and explorer Sir Joseph D. Hooker.

Digyna is derived from Greek and means 'having an ovary with two carpels'.

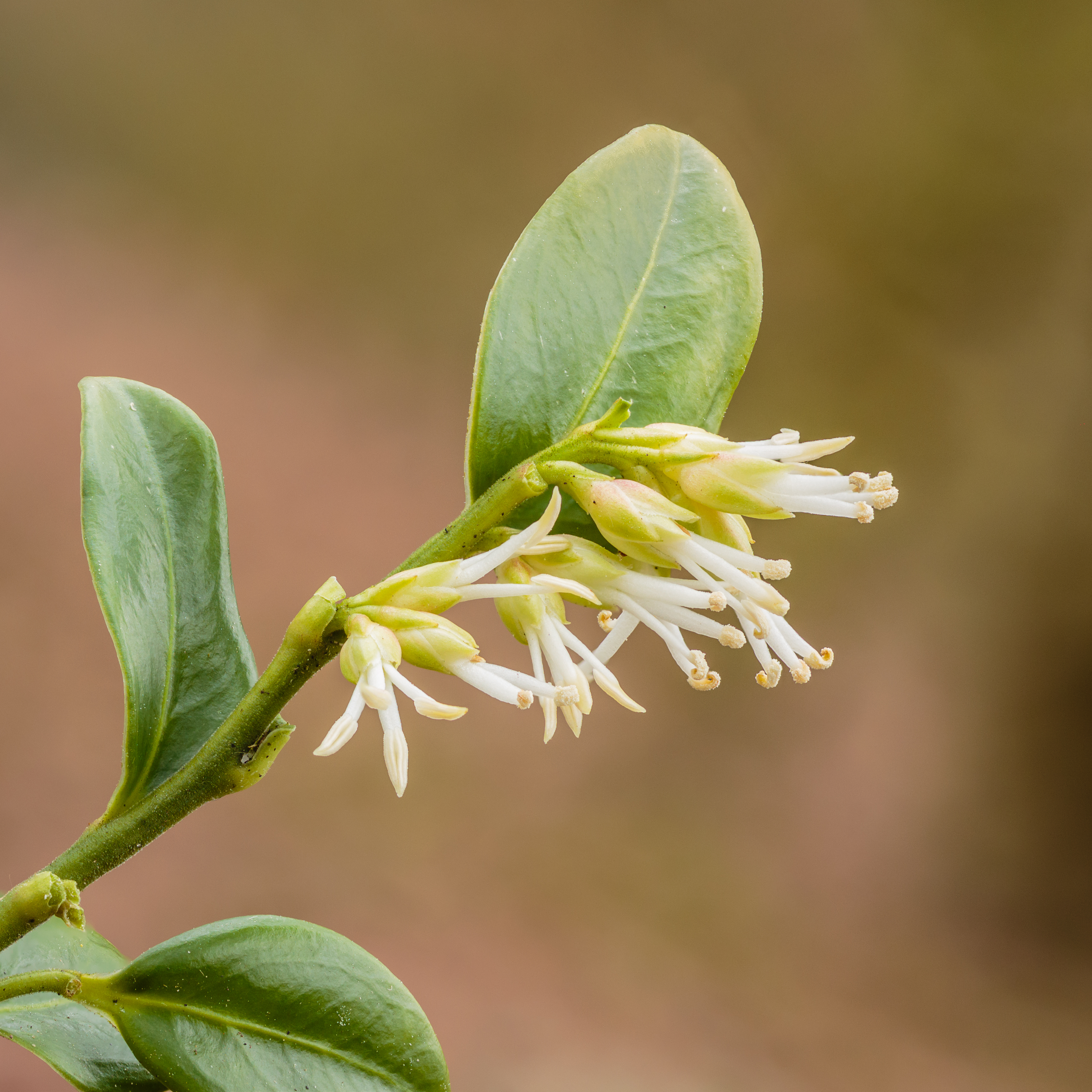
Flower

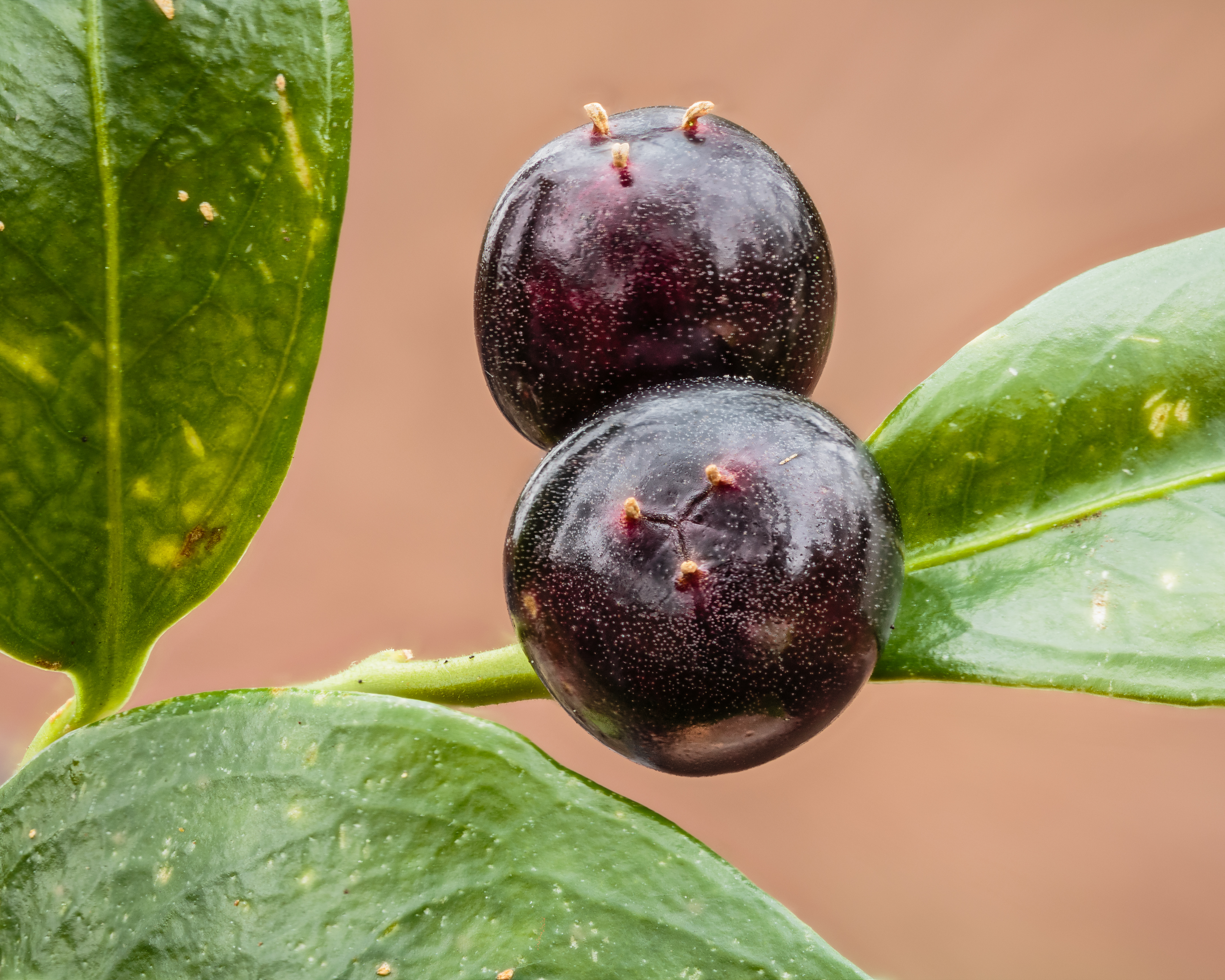
Berries
