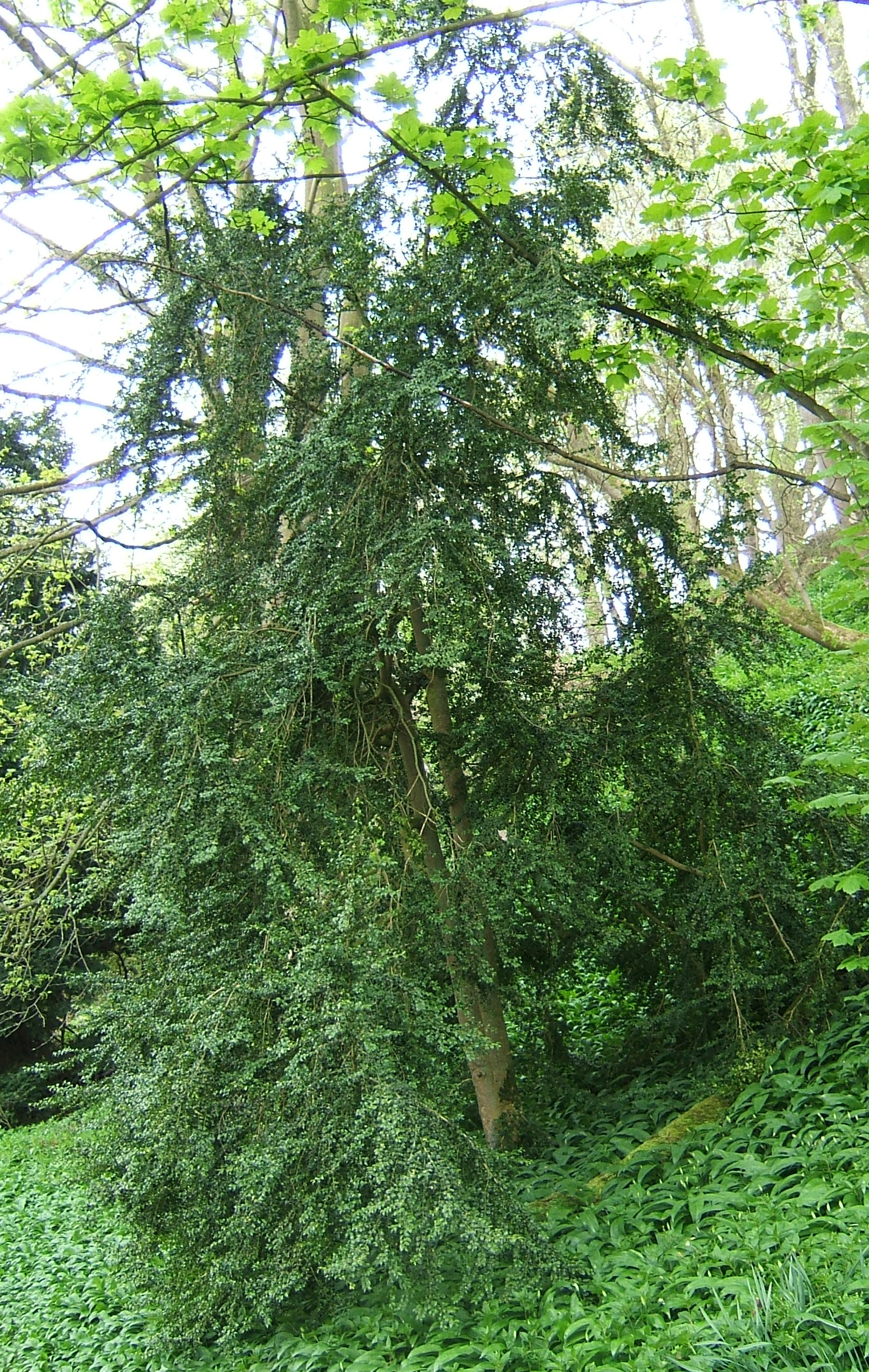
- Mature specimen

Scientific classification
- Kingdom: Plantae
- Clade: Embryophytes
- Clade: Tracheophytes
- Clade: Angiosperms
- Clade: Eudicots
- Order: Buxales
- Family: Buxaceae
- Genus: Buxus
- Species: B. sempervirens

Binomial name
- Buxus sempervirens L.
- Distribution range of Buxus sempervirens

= Buxus sempervirens =

Species of flowering plant in the box family

Buxus sempervirens, the common box, European box, or boxwood, is a species of flowering plant in the genus Buxus, native to western and southern Europe, northwest Africa, and southwest Asia, from southern England south to northern Morocco, and east through the northern Mediterranean region to Turkey. Buxus colchica of western Caucasus and B. hyrcana of northern Iran and eastern Caucasus are commonly treated as synonyms of B. sempervirens.

== Description ==
Buxus sempervirens is an evergreen shrub or small tree growing 1 to 9 m (3 to 30 ft) tall, with a trunk up to 20 centimetres (8 in) in diameter (exceptionally to 10 m tall and 45 cm diameter). Arranged in opposite pairs along the stems, the leaves are green to yellow-green, oval, 1.5–3 cm long, and 0.5–1.3 cm broad. The monoecious flowers are inconspicuous but highly scented, greenish-yellow, with no petals, and are insect pollinated; the fruit is a three-lobed capsule containing three to six seeds.

== Distribution and habitat ==
The species typically grows on soils derived from chalk, limestone, usually as an understorey in forests of larger trees, most commonly associated with European beech (Fagus sylvatica) forests, but also sometimes in open dry montane scrub, particularly in the Mediterranean region. Box Hill, Surrey is named after its notable box population, which comprises the largest area of native box woodland in England.

The species is locally naturalised in parts of North America.

== Cultivation ==
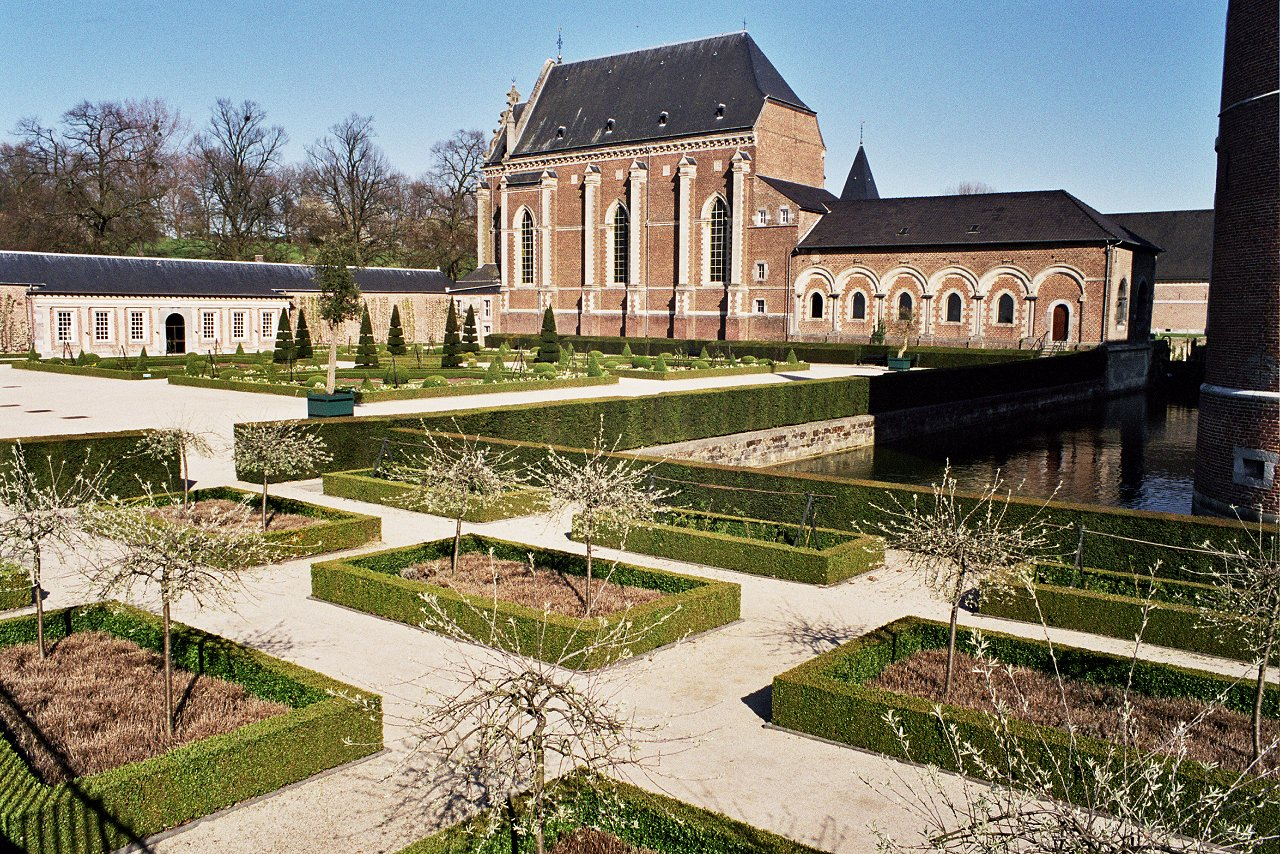
Box topiary in the garden of Alden Biesen Castle, Belgium

In Britain, four Roman burials featured coffins containing sprays of the evergreen box, a practice unattested elsewhere in Europe. Box leaves have also been found from several towns, villas and farmsteads in Roman Britain, indicating ornamental planting.

Box remains a very popular ornamental plant in gardens, being particularly valued for topiary and hedges because of its small leaves, evergreen nature, tolerance of close shearing, and scented foliage. The scent is not to everyone's liking: the herbalist John Gerard found it "evil and lothsome" and Daniel Defoe recounts that at Hampton Court Palace Queen Anne had the box hedging removed because she found its odour offensive.

In the American South, it has sometimes been called "rich man's hedge", and was often used to anchor the landscape plantings on either side of the front door of a house. The scent, most pungent on warm summer days, is not found disagreeable by all, despite its having been likened to cat urine.

Several cultivars have been selected, including 'Argenteo-variegata' and 'Marginata' with variegated foliage; such "gilded box" received a first notice in John Parkinson's Paradisi in Sole Paradisus Terrestris (1629). 'Vardar Valley', a slow-growing particularly hardy semi-dwarf cultivar, was selected in 1935 by the American botanist Edward Anderson in the upper Vardar valley and sent to the Arnold Arboretum for evaluation.

The following varieties and cultivars have gained the Royal Horticultural Society's Award of Garden Merit:-

- B. sempervirens 'Elegantissima'
- B. sempervirens 'Latifolia Maculata'

== Pests and diseases ==
A pest which spreads through Buxus sempervirens is Cydalima perspectalis, the box tree moth. A kind of box, B. microphylla is more injured by C. perspectalis than B. sempervirens.

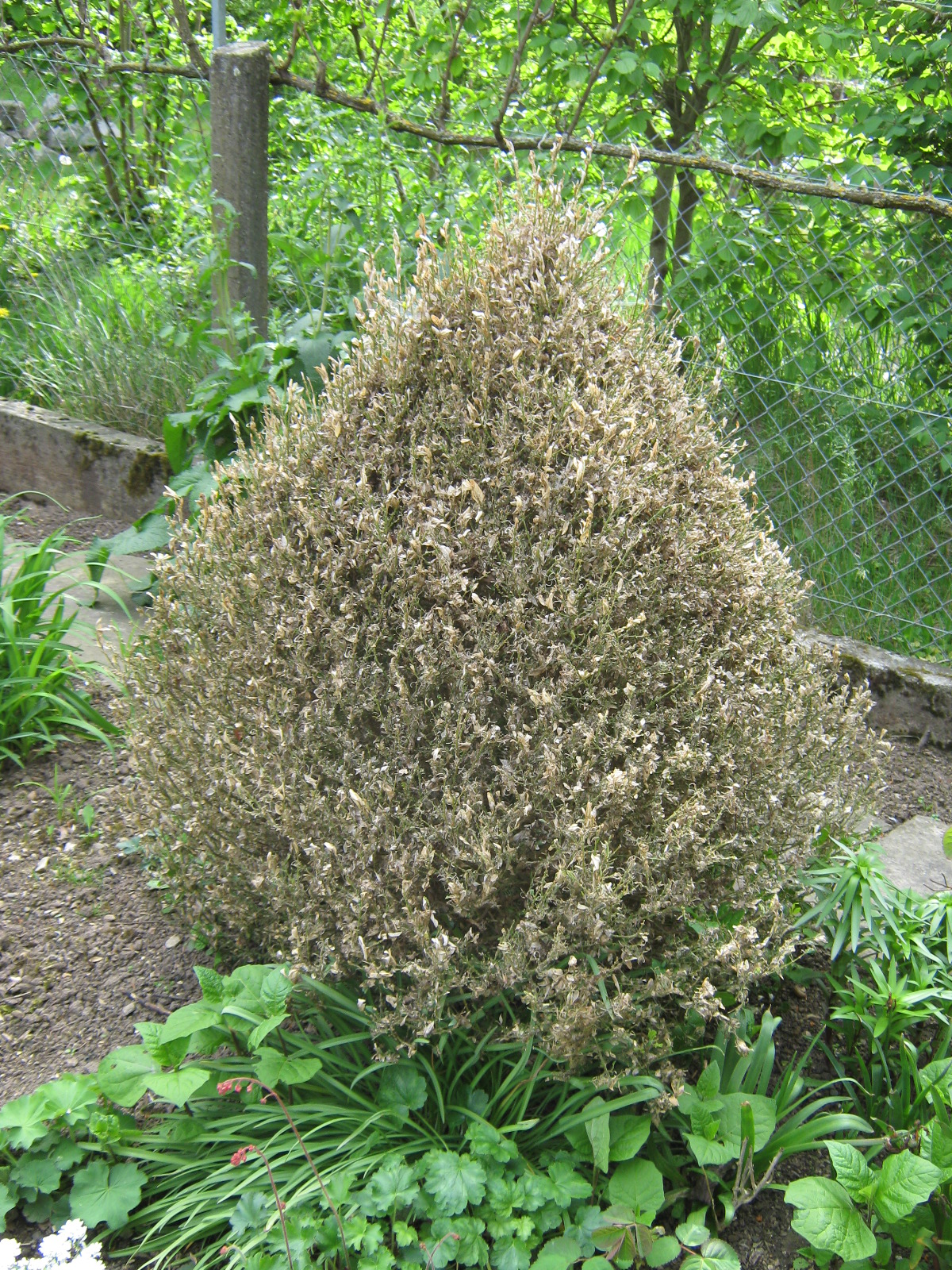
Infested box tree

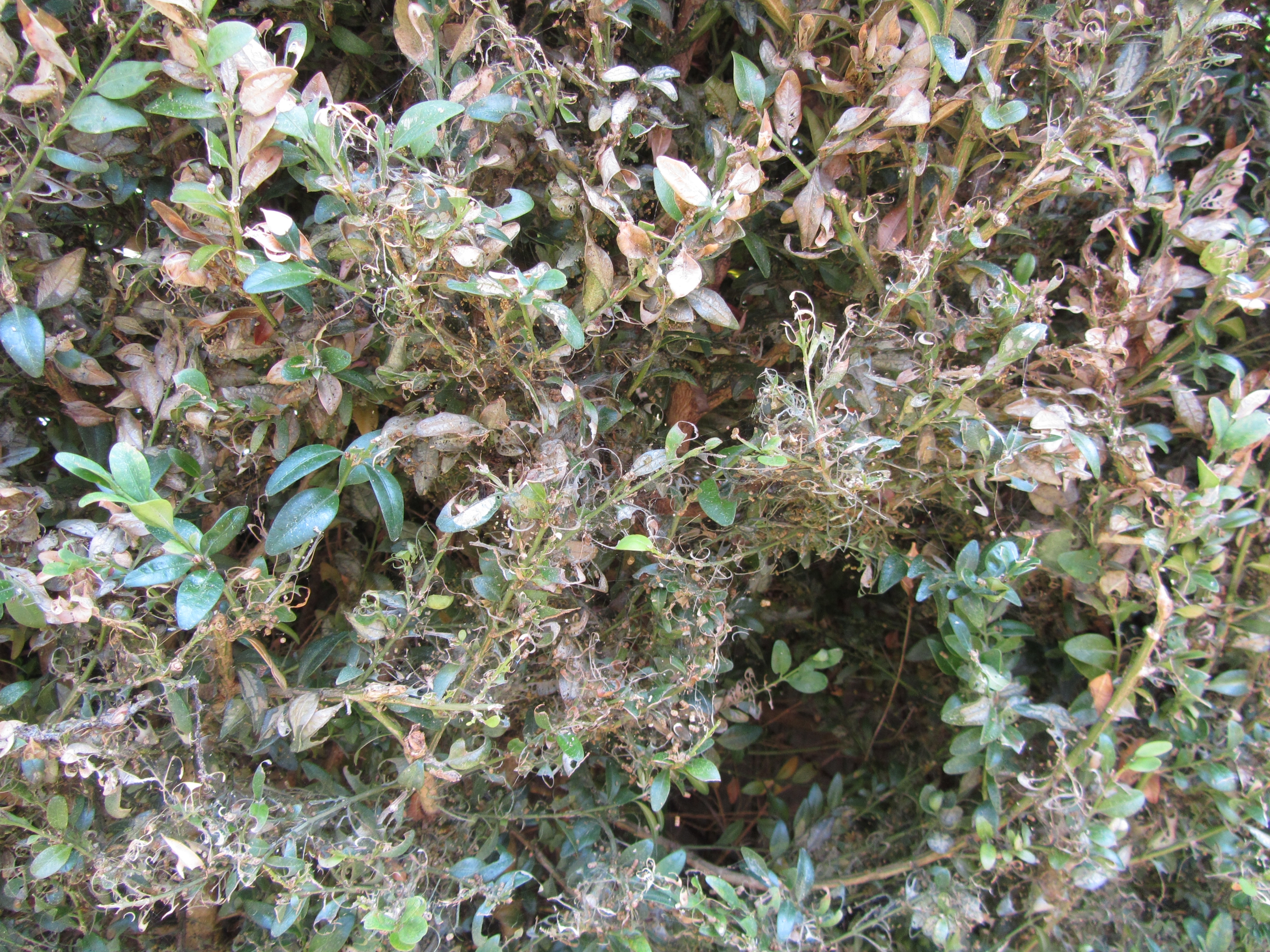
Detail of the defoliation

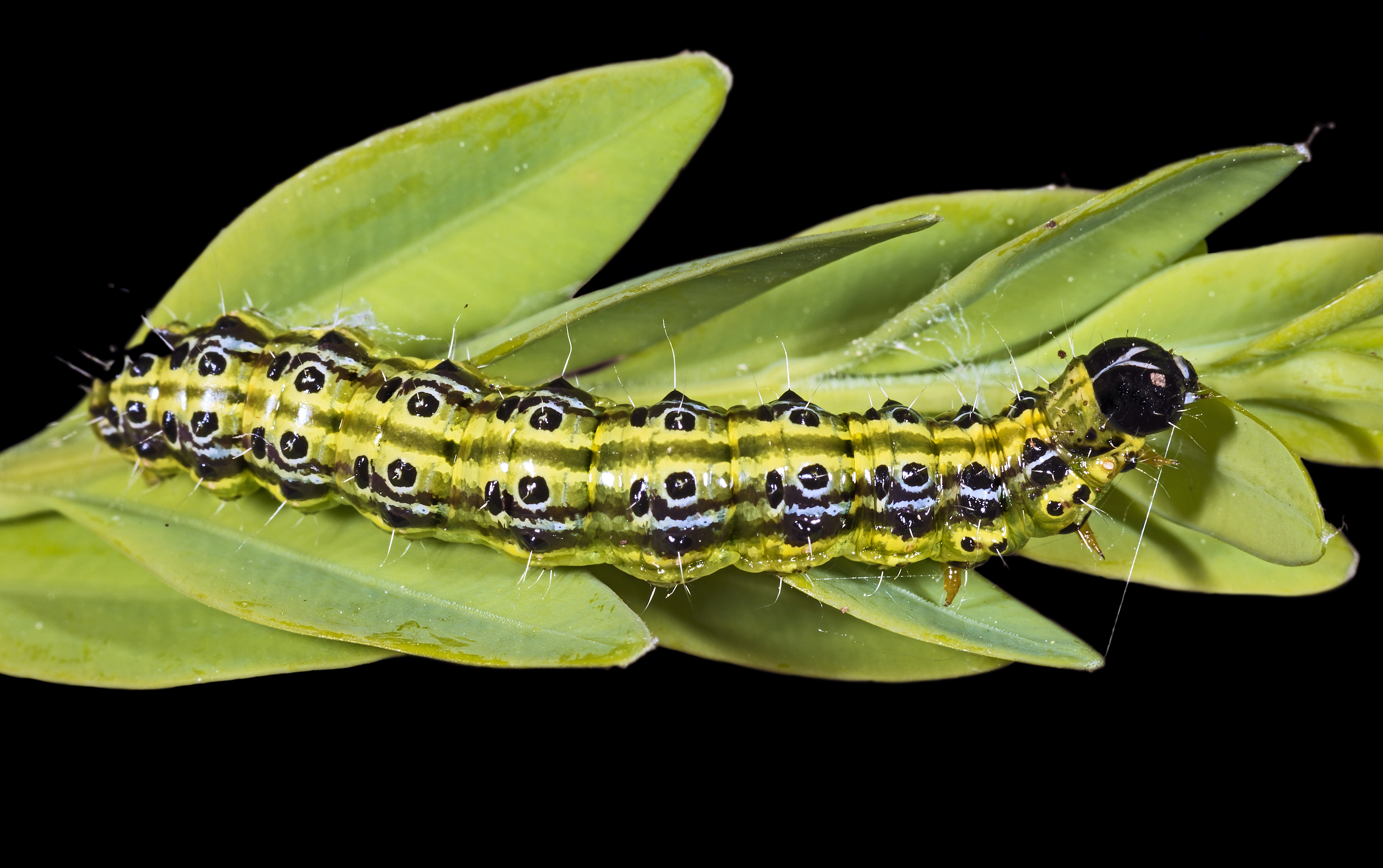
Larva

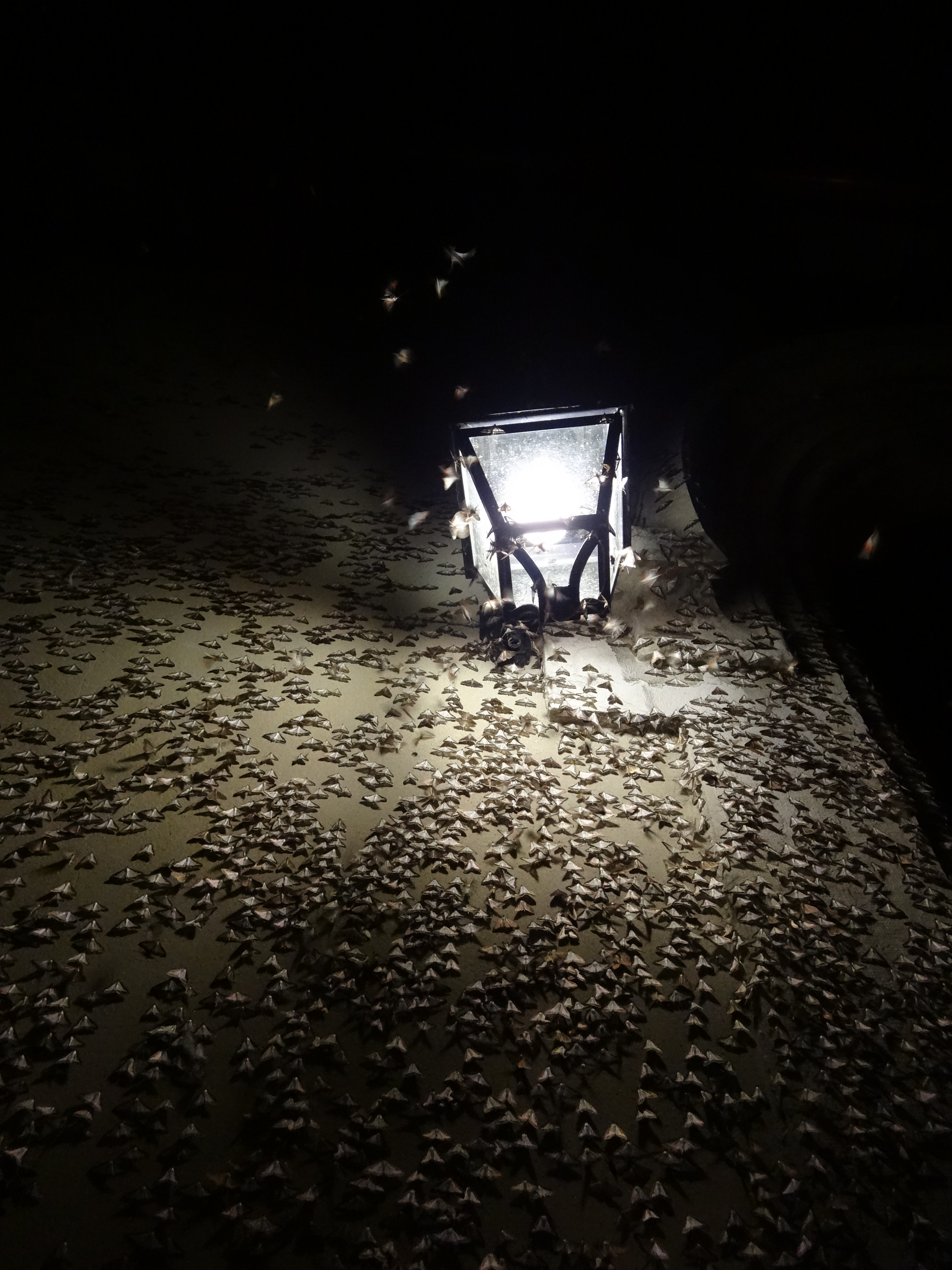
Adults

== Uses ==
The boxwood is identified with the Hebrew word תְאַשּׁוּר tə’aššûr oft-mentioned in the Book of Isaiah. Catholic households in climates where palms are scarce or nonexistent often use boxwood twigs instead to adorn their crosses on Palm Sunday.

=== Wood ===
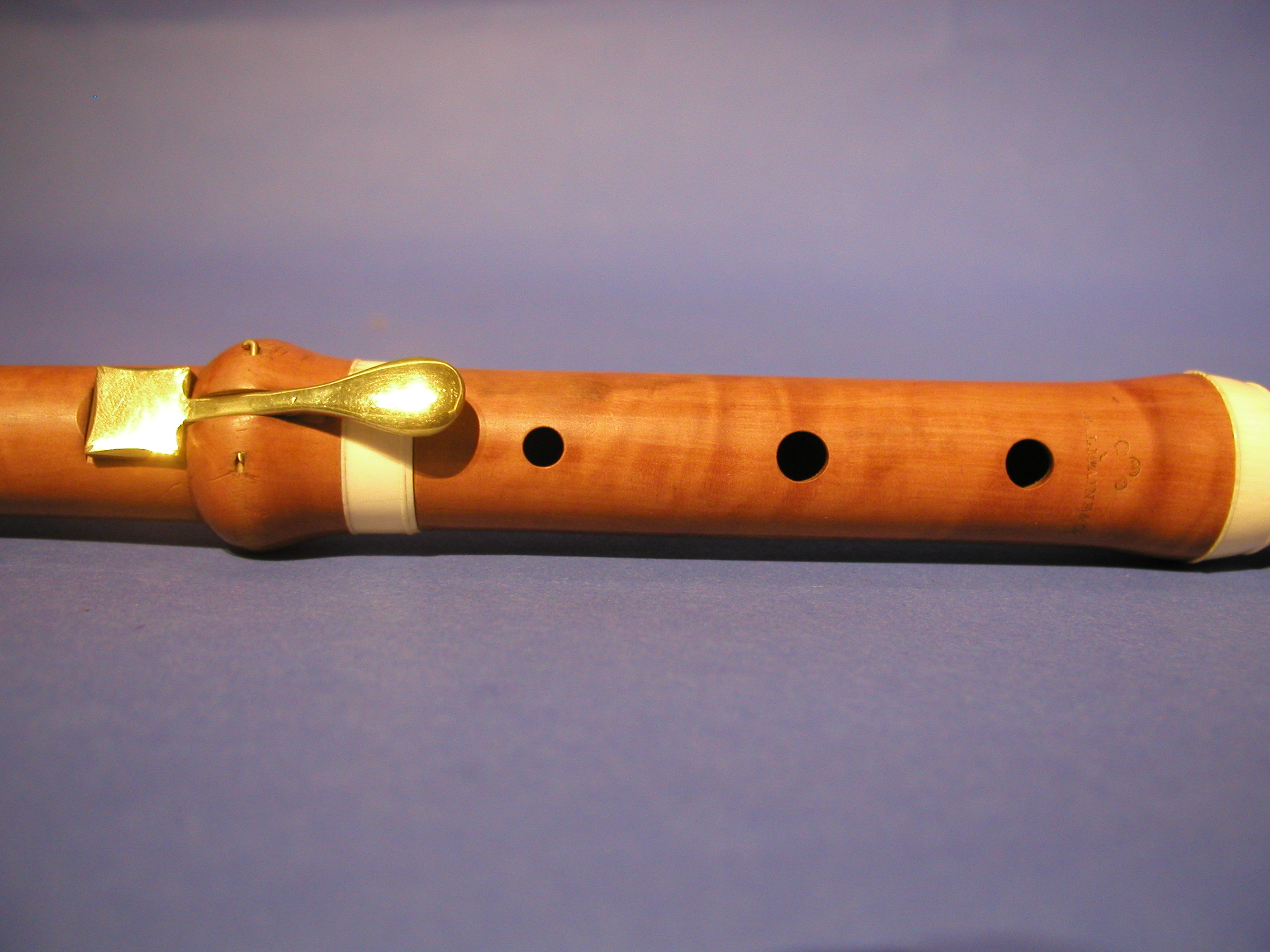
19th-century English flute made of boxwood (detail)

Slow growth of box renders the wood ("boxwood") very hard (possibly the hardest in Europe along with Cornus mas) and heavy, and free of grain produced by growth rings, making it ideal for cabinet-making, the crafting of flutes and oboes, engraving, marquetry, woodturning, tool handles, mallet heads and as a substitute for ivory; the wood is yellow in color. "Digging sticks" fashioned by Neanderthals more than 170,000 years ago in Italy were made from boxwood. The British wood-engraver Thomas Bewick pioneered the use of boxwood blocks for wood-engraving.

In Old English, a box was originally a receptacle made of boxwood.

=== Medicinal plant ===
The leaves were formerly used in place of quinine, and as a fever reducer.

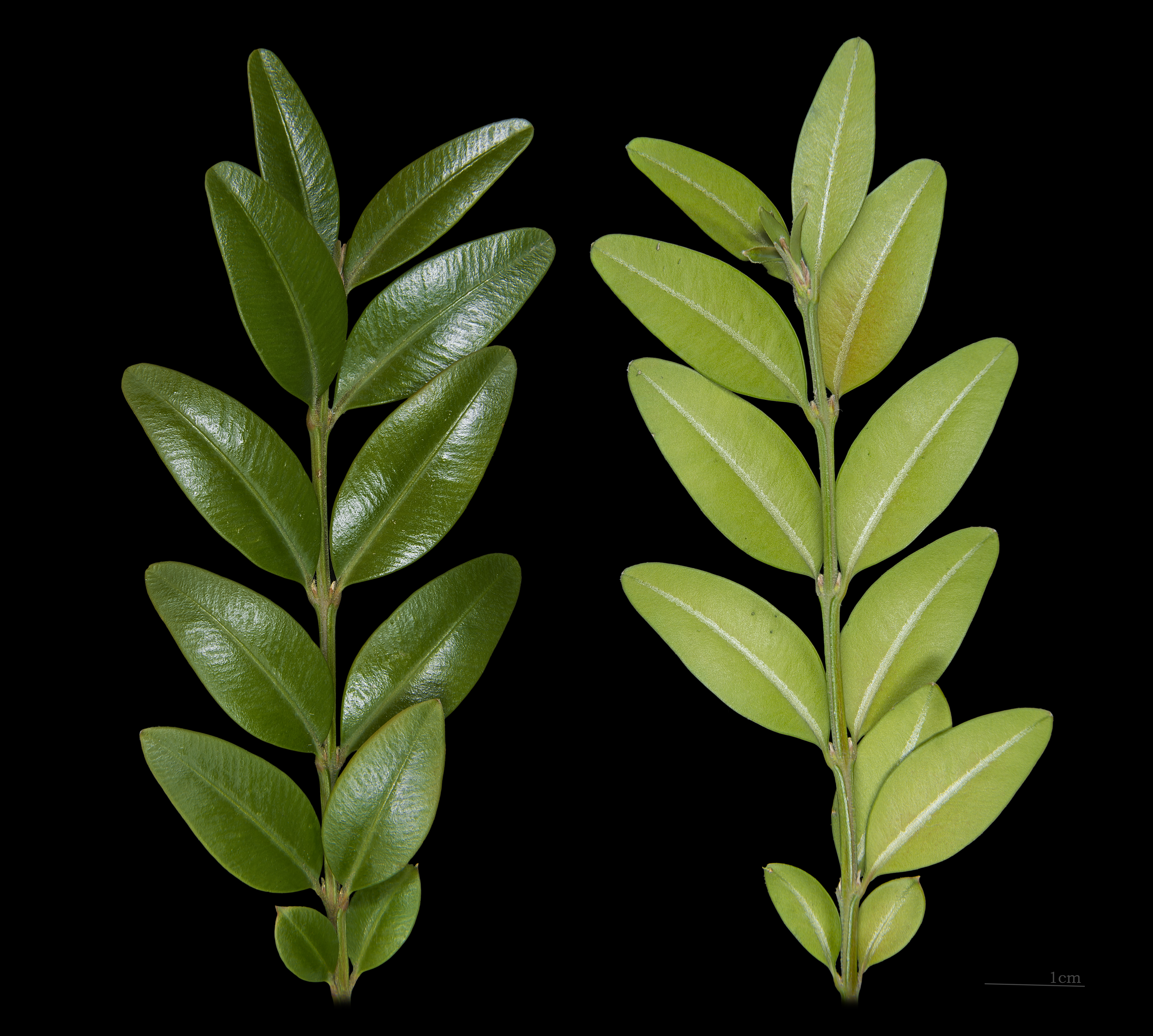
Foliage

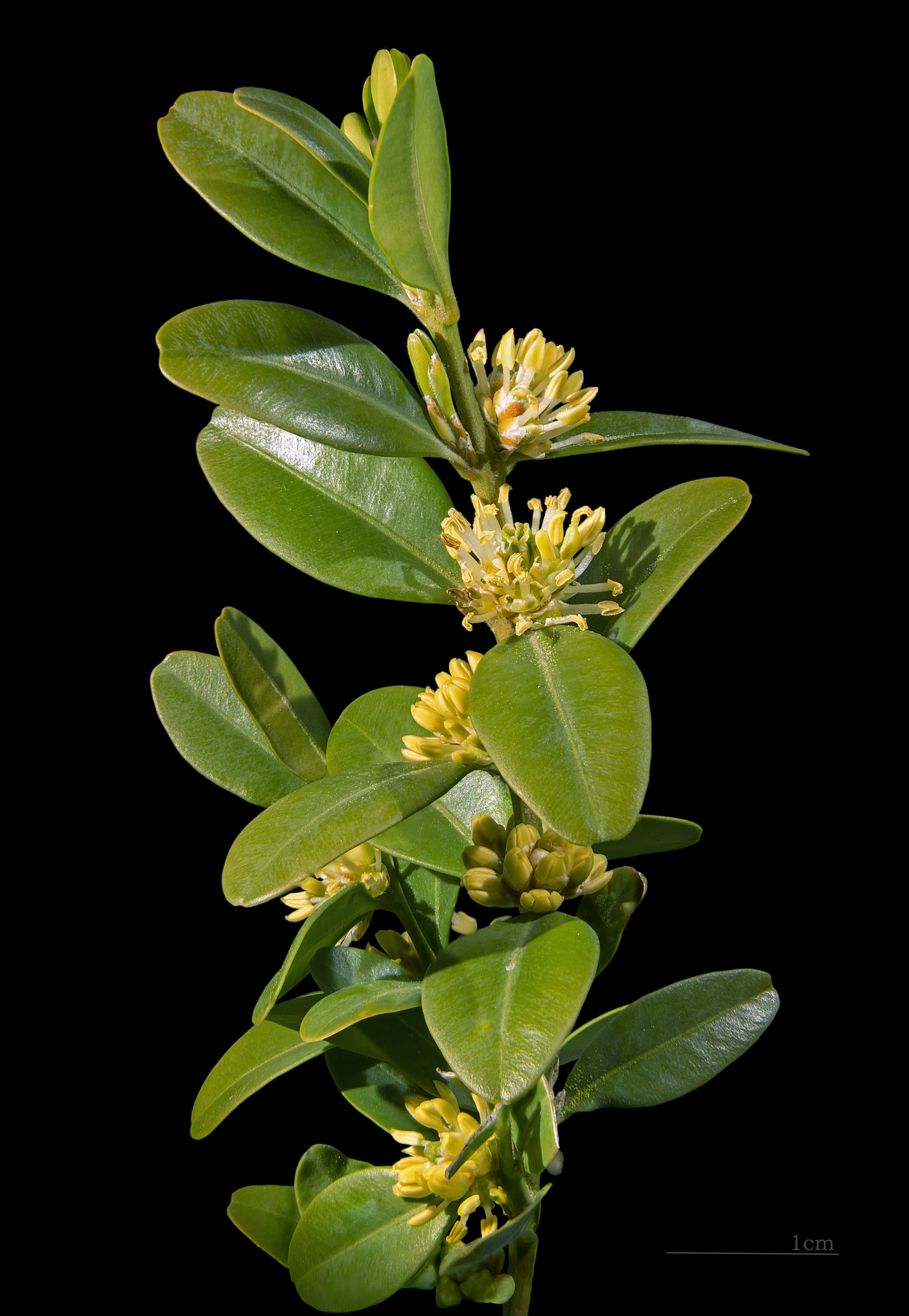
Flowers

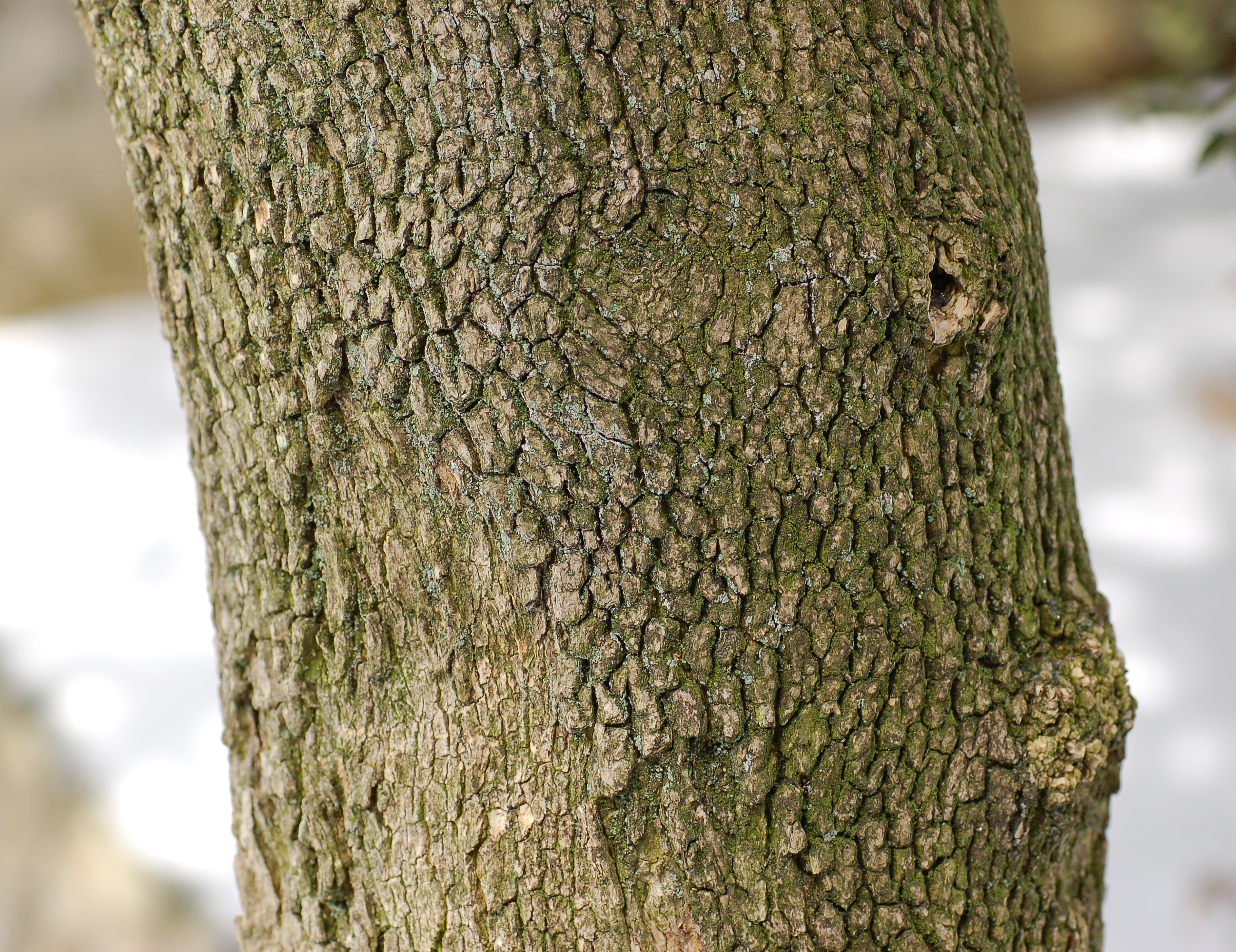
Bark of B. sempervirens 'Arborescens'

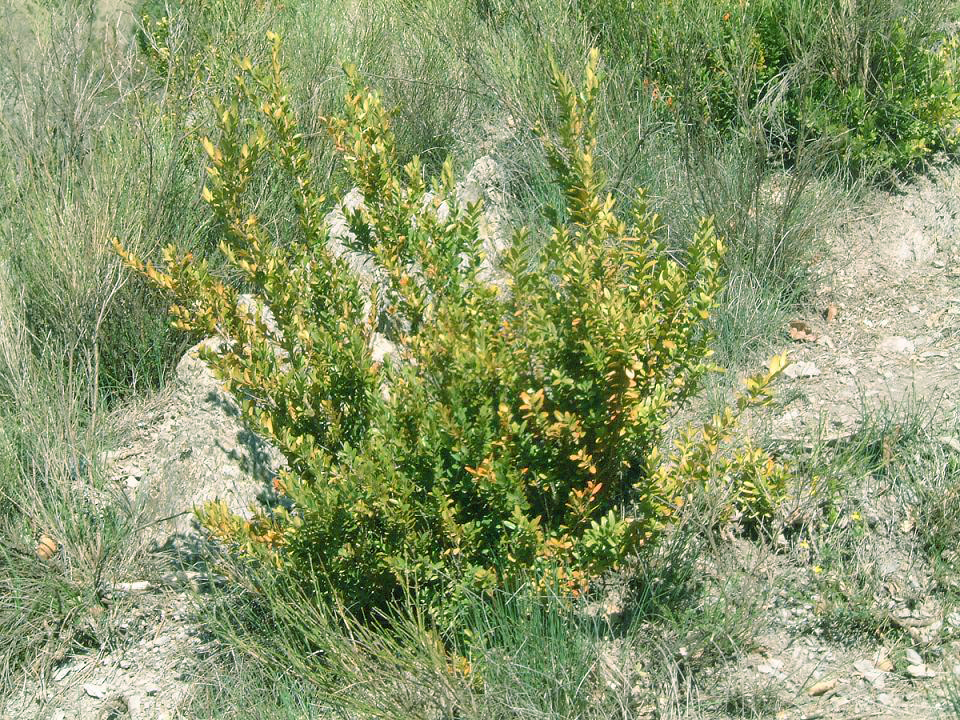
Plant growing in dry Mediterranean scrub

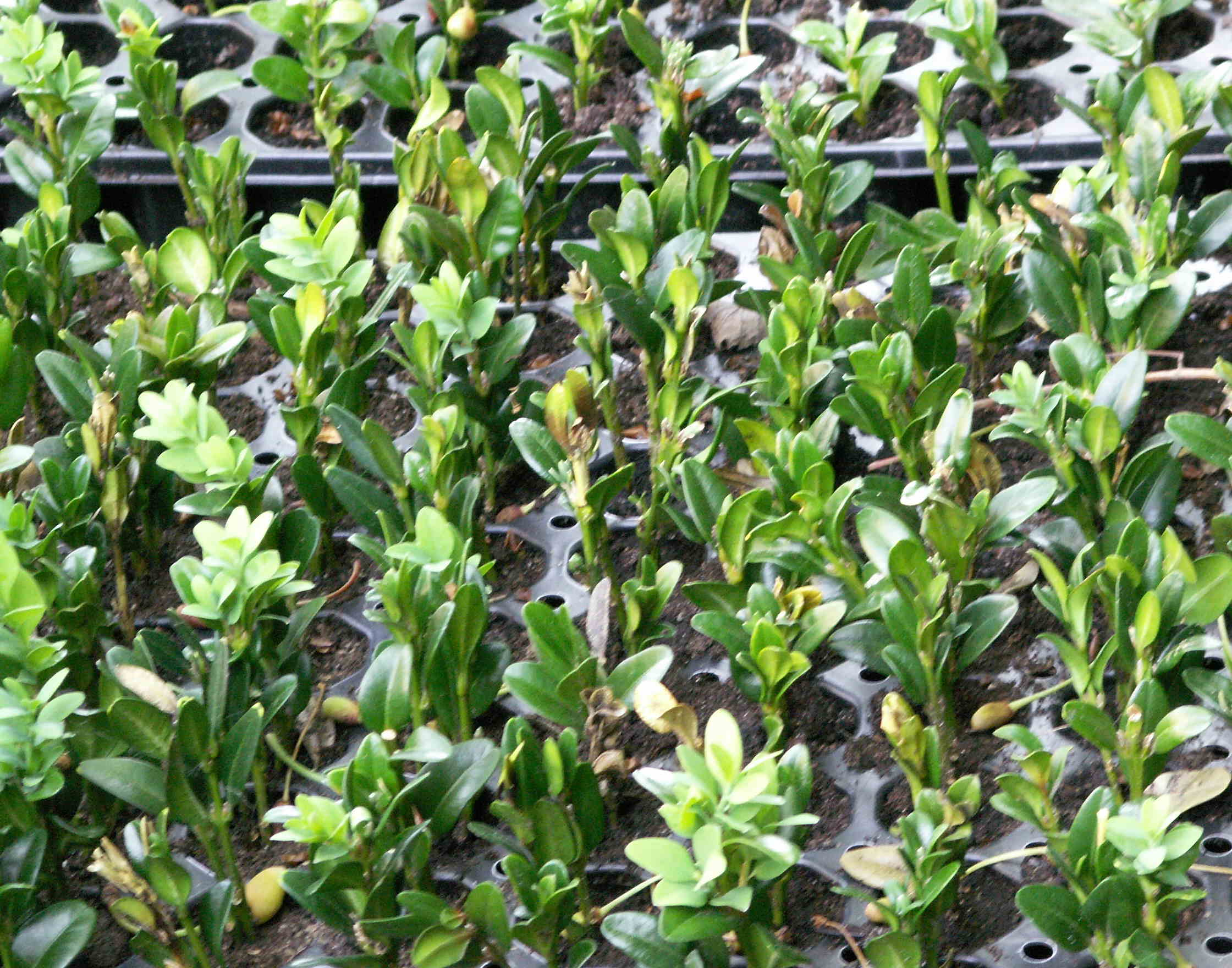
Cuttings

Buxus sempervirens is a medicinal plant used to treat many diseases. It contains steroidal alkaloids such as cyclobuxine. It also contains flavonoids.

B. sempervirens was not known for its medical use until the beginning of the 1600s. After this it was found that the leaves (containing alkaloids, oils and tannin), the bark (containing chlorophyll, wax, resin, lignin and minerals) and the oil from the wood had a medical effect. It then was used to treat gout, urinary tract infections, intestinal worms, chronic skin problems, syphilis, hemorrhoids, epilepsy, headache and piles, but also had the reputation of curing leprosy, rheumatism, HIV, fever and malaria. For treating malaria it was used as a substitute for quinine, but because of the side effects and the fact that there are better medicinal alternatives than B. sempervirens it is normally not used any more to treat these diseases.

Homeopaths still make use of the leaves against rheumatism. While herbalists have used box leaf tea to lower fevers, it is very rarely used today.

In Turkey, where the plant is called Adi şimşir, this tea (one glass a day) is still consumed for antihelminthic, diaphoretic, and cholagogue purposes. Also, the leaves from B. sempervirens were used as an auburn hair dye.

The plant Buxus sempervirens has been well investigated chemically. During late 1980s, Dildar Ahmed while working on his PhD thesis under the supervision of Prof Atta-ur-Rahman, isolated a number of steroidal alkaloids from the leaves of the plant. A new system of nomenclature for buxus alkaloids was also proposed based on buxane nucleus. He also isolated a flavonoid glycoside, and named it galactobuxin based on the fact that it contains a galactose ring.

== See also ==
- Boxwood blight
- Box tree moth
- Gothic boxwood miniature
