= Order of Free Gardeners =

Fraternal society founded in Scotland in the middle of the 17th century

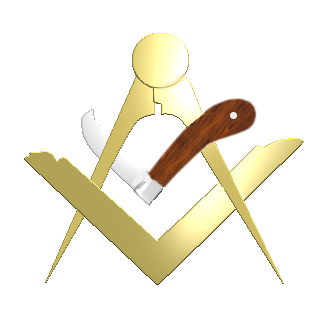
Insignia of the Order of Free Gardeners

The Order of Free Gardeners is a fraternal society that was founded in Scotland in the middle of the 17th century and later spread to England and Ireland. Thereafter, Free Gardenery spread to many other parts of the world initially to countries of the Empire. As with numerous other friendly societies of the time, its principal aim was the sharing of secret knowledge relevant to the profession of gardening, and mutual aid. Other such societies which were, and are, similar to Free Gardeners and Freemasons include, for example: Free Fishermen, Free Wrights (Carpenters), Free Colliers amongst several others. In the latter part of the 19th century, the activities of the Free Gardeners local mutual insurance, paying benefits for sickness, unemployment and funeral expenses began to dominate its activities to the detriment of initiation by ritual. By the end of the 20th century, the Order of Free Gardeners had become almost extinct.

In 1849, The Ancient Order of Free Gardeners Scotland, (a Grand Lodge similar to those of Freemasonry) was formed at Lasswade, Midlothian. The stated purpose of this body was to bring all existing lodges, in Scotland, under its control. It failed in this aim. Another attempt was made to create a single national governing body in 1859 at Edinburgh to which all known Free Gardeners lodges had been invited. That also was a failure but resulted in the formation of two Grand Lodges one for the east of Scotland and another for the west of the country.

In 1956, due to falling attendances in Scotland, the Grand Lodge charter was transferred to Cape Town, South Africa. In September 2005, the Ancient Order returned to Scotland when the Countess of Elgin Lodge No. 105, received its Charter to meet in Dysart, Fife. 2006 sees the return of the Grand Lodge of Free Gardeners Scotland from Cape Town to Scotland.

Although the Free Gardeners have always remained independent of Freemasonry, the history and organisation of the two orders show numerous similarities. Some commentators have pointed to possible mutual influences in the ancient history of the two organisations.

== History ==
The most ancient evidence of the order is a record of the minutes of the Haddington lodge, opened 16 August 1676, which begins with a compilation of fifteen rules called Interjunctions for ye Fraternity of Gardiners of East Lothian.

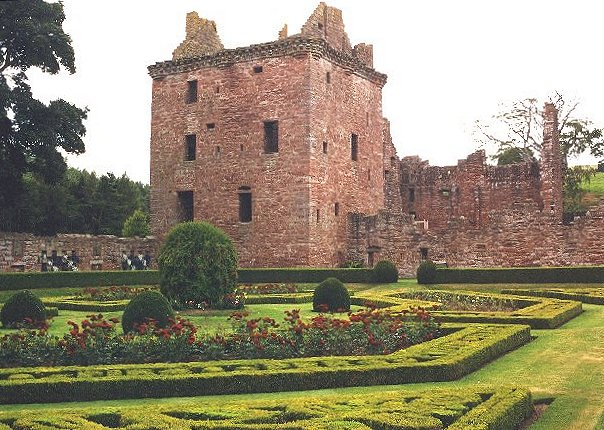
Edzell Castle's walled garden, Scotland, dates back to 1604.

Scotland was, in the 17th century, subject to civil unrest and intermittent famines. Rich landowners were interested in Renaissance architecture and the design of formal gardens for their vast estates. The first members of the Haddington lodge were not gardeners by profession, but small landowners and farmers who practised gardening for pleasure. Not practising an urban profession, they could not obtain the status of an incorporation (similar to a guild in England) and modelled their organisation on that of the masons, who had an organisation which was additional to and independent of, the incorporation: the lodge.

This organisation set up in Haddington could be viewed as a primitive form of trade union. It organised co-operation between members, provided practical training and ethical development, and supported the poor, widows, and orphans. The lodges of gardeners were also the first to organise floral exhibitions, from 1772.

About 1715, a lodge similar to Haddington was founded in Dunfermline, supported by two members of the local aristocracy, the Earl of Moray and the Marquess of Tweeddale. From its origin, it admitted numerous non-gardeners as members. It created a charitable society to benefit the widows, orphans, and poor of the lodge, sponsored a horse race and organised an annual horticultural fair before transforming itself little by little into a mutual aid society. It reached a membership of 212.

The lodges of Haddington and Dunfermline expanded their recruitment area widely without authorising creation of new lodges. It was only in 1796 that three new lodges were created: at Arbroath, Bothwell, and Cumbnathan.

During the 18th century, about twenty other lodges were created, always in Scotland, and on 6 November 1849, they organised a meeting with a view to create a Grand Lodge. Establishments then accelerated, and in 1859, in Edinburgh, the Grand Lodge gathered representatives from more than 100 lodges, including three established in the USA.

At the peak of the movement there were more than 10,000 Free Gardeners for the Lothians alone, belonging to more than 50 lodges.

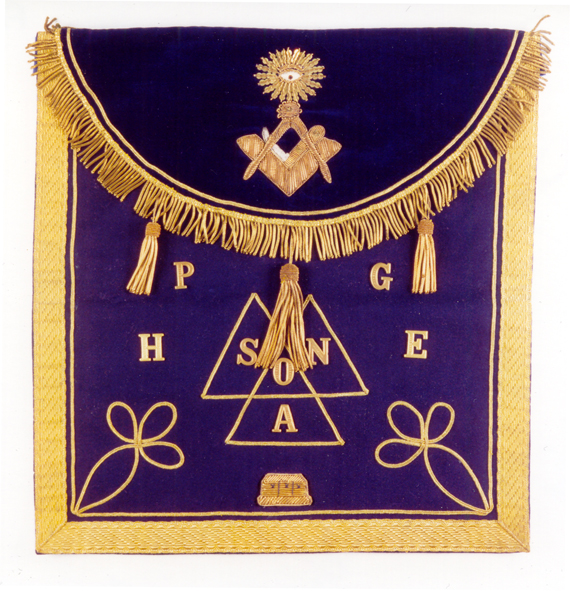
Free Gardeners' Apron, c.1920

Encouraged by this success, competing horticultural societies appeared during the 19th century. Unlike the Free Gardeners, they did not have a charitable role, mutual help, or rituals, and they would accept anybody, male or female, who paid their dues.

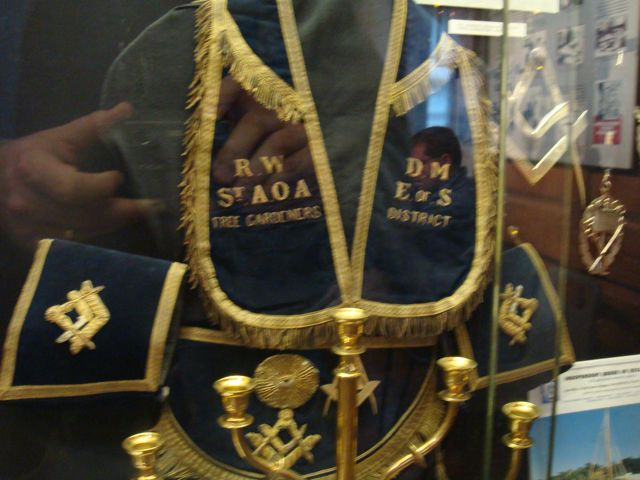
Free Gardener regalia on display in Edinburgh

In the 20th century, the two World Wars called up most of the members. The economic crisis of 1929 weakened their charitable capacities. The social protection laws weakened the attraction of mutual aid, before the National Insurance Act 1946 removed their entire purpose. Even before the Second World War, the number of deaths exceeded the number of admissions to the lodges. In 1939, the minutes of the Haddington lodge were interrupted until 1952, when its eight last members attempted in vain to relaunch it. Despite the recruitment of new members, the Haddington fraternity pronounced its dissolution on 22 February 1953. The Dunfermline lodge lasted until the middle of the 1980s.

These disappearances were part of a wider social change. In 1950 there were around 30,000 Friendly Societies in the UK, while in 2000 there were fewer than 150. In 2000, the research of Robert L. D. Cooper counted no more than a single lodge (in Bristol) for Great Britain, but mentioned the survival of the Order of Free Gardeners in the Antilles (Caribbean British Order of Free Gardners) and in Australia. In 2002, a conservation society was created in Scotland with aims of research and conservation of the traditions of this Order and some lodges were revived on this occasion.

As of 2013, The Grand United Order of Free Gardeners still operates in Victoria, Australia from the East Kew Masonic Centre. It meets monthly under the auspices of the Victorian Grand Lodge No. 1, and is the only known lodge operating in the southern hemisphere. In the 2020s, Free Gardeners experienced a significant growth spurt, with new lodges being formed in Schwetzingen, Germany, Edmonton, Canada and elsewhere, with a lineage back to the Scottish Grand Lodge (but not directly affiliated with it).

== Ritual ==
Fraternity documents from the end of the 17th century reveal no trace of secret knowledge or rituals. However, the interest rapidly shown by the members of the aristocracy suggests this association did not exclusively deal with mutual assurance.

The oldest known mention of the existence of an initiation secret in this order appears on 28 January 1726, when the fraternity studied an internal complaint that accused one of its members of defaming certain of its officers in saying they could not correctly give its words and signs. In 1772, other documents established that the fraternity of the Free Gardeners had 'Words' and 'Secrets'. An 1848 document mentions a teaching, in the form of 'Signs, Secrets and Grips'. Historians have at their disposal complete rituals of the Apprentice, Companion and Master dating from 1930. Minutes of the lodges show that the ritual of the order progressively developed, from a fairly basic ceremony of transmission of the 'Word' at its very beginnings, to a system of three grades similar to that of Freemasonry at the end of the 19th century.

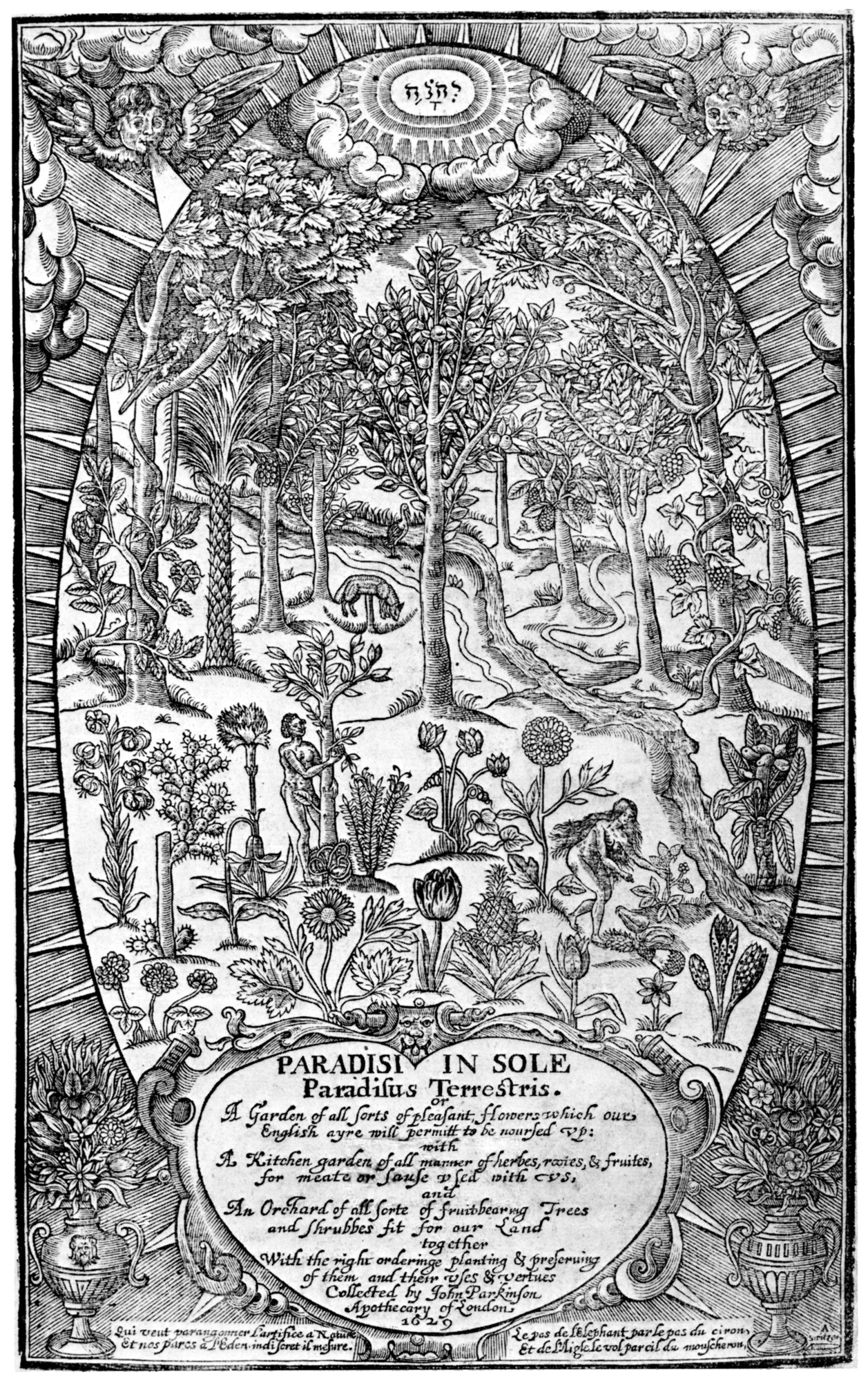
Frontispiece of Paradisi in Sole Paradisus Terrestris (1629) by Swiss artist Christopher Switzer

A conference of 1873 indicates that Free Gardening used the cultivation of soil as the symbol of the nurturing of the spirit in intelligence and virtue and made reference to the Garden of Eden.

- The admission ritual of the Free Gardeners' apprentices shows many similarities to that of Freemason apprentices. Adam could thus symbolically be the first Free Gardener. Use is made of the compass and the square, to which is added the pruning knife, presented as 'the simplest tool of gardening', allowing 'pruning the vices and propagating virtues by cuttings'. At the end of this ceremony, the apprentice received the apron of his grade.
- The second degree made reference to Noah, the 'second Gardener' and made the Companion symbolically accomplish a voyage that led him towards the Garden of Eden then towards that of Gethsemane.
- The third degree made reference to Solomon, the 'third Gardener', and to the symbol of the olive tree.

The aprons are of two types:

- Long aprons, reaching the ankle, embroidered with numerous symbols relating to the legends of the order.
- Shorter aprons, with a semi-circular bib, strongly resembling the aprons of the Freemasons of Scotland. That of the president is embroidered with the letters P, G, H, E, initials of Pishon, Gihon, Hiddekel (Tigris) and Euphrates (the four rivers of the Garden of Eden) and A, N, S, initials of Adam, Noah and Solomon, to which is added the letter O, probably for 'Olive'.

Generally, the symbolism used by the Free Gardeners seems to have been strongly influenced during the 19th century by that of Freemasonry.

On numerous objects of the order dating from the very beginning of the 20th century, one finds an emblem composed of a square, a compass and a grafting knife. As there is not a trace of this emblem in the earlier documents, it is probable that it had also been inspired lately by that of Freemasonry.

== The first members ==
There is little information on the professions of the members before the end of the 17th century. During this period the Haddington lodge included merchants, tailors and clerks as well as gardeners. All the members of the lodge were originally from the county. On the other hand, the lodge at Dunfermline, former capital of Scotland, prided itself on counting among its members "numerous renowned persons of Edinburgh, as well as East Lothian including the Marquess of Tweeddale, the count of Haddington (Earl of Haddington), Lord William Hay etc".

The first record of the Dunfermline lodge was established in 1716 with the signatures of 214 members. At this time the membership was composed of a majority of gardeners by trade, but also numerous artisans and two members of the local aristocracy. Rapidly, the membership grew and the social level rose—to the point that the professional gardeners no longer formed the majority of new members—but the recruitment remained local. In 1721, 101 new members of all social statuses were admitted into the lodge, from gardeners and butchers to the Duke of Atholl. The following years saw a fairly large number of aristocrats initiated in Free Gardening in the Dunfermline lodge, even while they remain on the edge of the Haddington lodge, which remains mainly active. Most of these people possess famous gardens. Starting from 1736, the date of the creation of the (Masonic) Grand Lodge of Scotland, this tendency ceased and there were no more initiations of aristocrats in the Dunfermline lodge.

Religiously, all the members of this time were Protestants and belonged to the Church of Scotland. Politically, on the other hand, there were all types.

== Comparisons with Freemasonry ==
In the 1720s, Scotland had a profusion of societies, fraternities, and clubs. Freemasonry and the Order of Free Gardeners are merely those that spread the furthest and lasted the longest.

Those two orders present important similarities concerning their organisation and development. Both were born in Scotland in the middle of the 17th century among groups of professional workers who very quickly accepted members from other professions. In both cases, members of the original profession became minorities from the beginning of the 18th century. In both orders also, certain lodges open very rapidly to 'accepted' members and in particular to the local nobility, whereas others, like that of Haddington for the Free Gardeners and that of Edinburgh for the Freemasons, are more reticent.

Almost all known members who belonged to the two orders were Free Gardeners before becoming Freemasons. The largest group of Free Gardeners who later became Freemasons joined the Kilwinning Scots Arms Masonic lodge founded in 1729. There were nine members of the free gardeners Dunfermline lodge. None of them were gardeners by trade; they were aristocrats and soldiers.

Freemasonry expanded rapidly in England and, after creation of the Grand Lodge in London in 1717, across the entire world. On the other hand, the Order of Free Gardeners remained principally Scottish. In both cases, the Scottish lodges seemed to have difficulties grouping together into larger structures called Grand Lodges. In the case of the Order of Free Gardeners, the first Grand Lodge only formed in 1849, and 15 lodges remained independent until the disappearance of the order. In both cases, it is in particular the lodges founded before their Grand Lodge that remain the most reluctant to renounce their independence.

== Miscellaneous ==
Ancient Free Gardeners, an indie-rock band in Melbourne, Australia, takes its name from the Free Gardeners, though the group has no association. The inspiration came from a visit to the Melbourne branch of the Free Gardeners, situated in Elizabeth Street, one block north of the Victoria Market. Whilst the Free Gardeners no longer meet at that location, the building still bears its logo and inscription.

== See also ==
- Freemasonry
- Friendly Society
- Secret society
