= Cyclobuxine =

Names
- IUPAC name (20S)-14-Methyl-3β,20-bis(methylamino)-4-methylidene-9,19-cyclo-5α,9β-pregnan-16α-ol
- Systematic IUPAC name (1S,2R,3aS,3bS,5aR,7S,9aR,10aS,12aR)-3a,12a-Dimethyl-7-(methylamino)-1-[(1S)-1-(methylamino)ethyl]-6-methylidenetetradecahydro-1H,10H-cyclopenta[a]cyclopropa[e]phenanthren-2-ol
- Other names Cyclobuxine D

Identifiers
CAS Number	2241-90-9
3D model (JSmol)	Interactive image
ChemSpider	228595
KEGG	c10797
PubChem CID	260437
UNII	RP83EW60V2
CompTox Dashboard (EPA)	DTXSID101046371
- InChI: InChI=1S/C25H42N2O/c1-15-17-7-8-20-23(4)13-19(28)21(16(2)26-5)22(23,3)11-12-25(20)14-24(17,25)10-9-18(15)27-6/h16-21,26-28H,1,7-14H2,2-6H3/t16-,17-,18-,19+,20-,21-,22+,23-,24+,25-/m0/s1 Key: BSNZFQANPMIOIU-WZBMPAQFSA-N
- SMILES: C[C@@H]([C@H]1[C@@H](C[C@@]2([C@@]1(CC[C@]34[C@H]2CC[C@@H]5[C@]3(C4)CC[C@@H](C5=C)NC)C)C)O)NC

Properties
Chemical formula	C_{25}H_{42}N_{2}O
Molar mass	386.624 g·mol^{−1}
- Except where otherwise noted, data are given for materials in their standard state (at 25 °C [77 °F], 100 kPa). Infobox references

Cyclobuxine is an alkaloid, which can be found in Buxus sempervirens (family Buxaceae) better known as common boxwood, and is derived from the cholesterol skeleton. Alkaloids can be found in the whole plant, but the largest amounts of alkaloids (up to 3%) including cyclobuxine can be found in the leaves and bark.

== Occurrence ==
Cyclobuxine is one compound of B. sempervirens, which grows in Europe, northwest Africa and southwest Asia. Also it can be found in the eastern United States as Virginia, Tennessee, Ohio, New York and North Carolina. This broad, thick, leathery-leaf, evergreen shrub is commonly cultivated as a hedge and to sculpture with it.

== History ==
B. sempervirens was not known for its medical use until the beginning of the 1600s. After this it was found that the leaves (containing alkaloids, oils and tannin), the bark (containing chlorophyll, wax, resin, lignin and minerals) and the oil from the wood had a medical effect. It then was used to treat gout, urinary tract infections, intestinal worms, chronic skin problems, syphilis, hemorrhoids, epilepsy, headache and piles, but also had the reputation of curing leprosy, rheumatism, HIV, fever and malaria. For treating malaria it was used as a substitute for quinine, but because of the side effects and the fact that there are better plants to help people than B. sempervirens it is normally not used any more to cure these diseases.

Homoeopathy still made use of the leaves against rheumatism, HIV and fever by brewing tea from them. In Turkey this tea (one glass a day) is still consumed for antihelminthic, diaphoretic, and cholagogue purposes and is called "Abi Şimşir". Also, the leaves from B. sempervirens were used as an auburn hair dye.

== Structure and reactivity ==
Cyclobuxine is a steroidal alkaloid and thus an organic polycyclic compound. It contains cyclopropane ring containing 9β,19-cyclopregnane cyclic structure (some related alkaloids have 9(10→19)-abeopregnane structure, and can have an amino function at C3 and/or C-20). Cyclobuxine possesses a 4-methylene-group. The molecule has a substitution pattern at C-4 and C-14 which is intermediate in the biogenetic scheme between lanosterol- and cholesterol-type steroids.

== Synthesis ==
The biosynthetic precursor of cyclobuxine is cycloartenol. It can be synthesized by a side chain degradation of the 17β-side chain. However, it is often not synthesized but extracted from the plant itself.

== Mechanisms of action ==
Cyclobuxine can cause different reactions in the body. It is known as a toxin, but was also proven to have beneficial properterties.

In 1999 a study of the B. sempervirens revealed toxic effects on humans. Intoxication in humans and animals was not uncommon. Initial excitement was followed by growing mobilization and finally death was caused by paralysis, i.e. respiratory failure.

The nucleic interactions of cyclobuxine has been well-studied in one particular research. It was found that cyclobuxine has a biphasic effect on the stability of nucleic acids. This means that at low concentrations, cyclobuxine has a favourable effect of stabilization on the original conformation of DNA and other polydeoxynucleotides, it has an adverse effect of destabilization on the original structure at high concentrations. This effect of cyclobuxine on nucleic acids is however reversible and was found to have no effect on strand separation or re-combination. The simplest explanation of this effect by the toxin is probably one which states that stabilization is caused by strong and preferential binding of cyclobuxine molecules to certain sites on the native DNA B helix, presumably involving a bridged structure using both amino groups. Destabilization is caused by a weaker interaction with sites on the coils that become unmasked, at least in part, as denaturation progresses and the structure become more and more disordered. This means that the conformational stability of a highly ordered polynucleotide (DNA, RNA etc.) can be manipulated either by the addition of a cyclobuxine-like molecules in small increments, or in its presence at quite low concentration, by fluctuations in ionic strength. This may form the basis for a model of the mode of action of steroid hormones at the polynucleotide level.

== Metabolism ==
Alkaloids are known to play an important role in the defense of plants against herbivores. Cyclobuxine is no exception as it protects the Buxus plant from herbivores.

The exact pathways of the metabolism are yet poorly understood. Due to new techniques researchers can investigate the complex biology of alkaloid pathways much better, which will contribute to more effective as well as reliable research on the pathway(s) of cyclobuxine in the future. As cyclobuxine is presumed to act/interfere in the pathway which results in HIV/AIDS, it is the most understood pathway. The antiretroviral effect of SPV-30 was first identified by Durant, which is an herbal extract (containing cyclobuxine) from B. sempervirens. Cyclobuxine is one of the five most active alkaloids that are present in this extract. It targets the reverse transcriptase enzyme and thereby has inhibitory effect on HIV by seemingly delaying the decrease in CD4 cell counts. Although these findings seem promising, further scientific evidence is needed to show the exact pathways and effects of cyclobuxine.

The most important and best investigated negative pathway of cyclobuxine would be the inhibition of acetylcholinesterase (AChE). This process would increase the acetylcholine levels and would have cholinergic effects. This could interact with several diseases and conditions in the human body. Cyclobuxine could also have a positive effect on Alzheimer's disease, as acetylcholinesterase inhibitors are an important therapeutic strategy in Alzheimer's disease.

== Indications ==
Indications of toxification with cyclobuxine include nausea, vomiting, dizziness, diarrhea, dyspnea, ataxia, spasms and possibly death by respiratory arrest. Not all these individual symptoms are a direct indication of cyclobuxine. Other chemicals or diseases could lead to the same indications because a causal relationship of cyclobuxine has not yet been determined. Examination of the individual would be necessary for a correct diagnosis.

== Research ==
Cyclobuxine has been studied for the treatment of HIV/AIDS and other diseases involving tumor necrosis factor (TNF). A medical study has reported that trail dose administration of extract from the Buxus plant (SPV30) to HIV patients leads to a delay in the progression of HIV and that no severe side-effects were observed. There is evidence that 990 mg of extract from the Buxus plant per day might delay the disease progression of HIV-infected patients. In this extract there is cyclobuxine present. CD4 cell count decrease seems delayed with this dose of extract per day. A higher dose of 1980 mg per day has no effect, which is possibly due to the oxidative stress that is induced by flavonoids in the extract.

== Adverse effects ==
Cyclobuxine falls under the following classes of toxins: inflammatory, cytotoxic, neurotoxic. Cytotoxins can interfere with important cellular functions by targeting biological membranes (which control the import and export of metabolites and ions in cells), several enzymes and proteins as well as DNA/RNA and related processes. Neurotoxins can affect important ion channels of neuronal cells, such as Na+, K+ and Ca2+ channels by either permanent activation or inhibition. Both inhibition and activation block the transduction of neuronal signals and thereby prohibit the activity of the central nervous system as well as neuromuscular signaling.

Ingestion of the cyclobuxine (among other steroidal alkaloids found in extracts of the Buxus plant) has several adverse effects on animals. Due to lack of knowledge on the mode of action of cyclobuxine, (adverse) effects of the toxin are seen as general responses, as mentioned under Indications.

== Toxicity ==
According to oral toxicity, cyclobuxine falls under the Ib toxicity class, which defines its effect as being highly hazardous (5 to 50 mg/kg body weight). Compounds within this class of toxicity are known to interfere with central functions in animals. Cyclobuxine is generally considered mildly toxic to humans. However, for animals (cats, dogs and especially horses), it is estimated to be highly toxic and can even be fatal. The (registered) lethal dose of cyclobuxine (leaves up to 1% dry weight) is 0.1 g/kg for dogs and 750 g leaves or levels approaching 0.15% of the body weight for horses.

== Effects on animals ==
Cyclobuxine is known to cause disturbance of the gastrointestinal (GI) tract and is, as previously mentioned, poisonous to animals, particularly herbivores (e.g. horses). An experimental study in the isolated rat uterus has led to the presumption that cyclobuxine has an inhibitory effect (a decrease in peak tension and duration) on acetylcholine, oxytocin and Ba2+-induced contraction of the smooth muscle, which may be due to blocking of potassium-activated calcium channels, voltage-sensitive calcium channels.

In consecutive studies done by Lee et al., beneficial effects of cyclobuxine have been reported. In one study, it is suggested that cyclobuxine has an anti-inflammatory activity, by reducing prostaglandin production and leukocyte migration (in inflammatory exudates, both in vitro and in vivo) in a dose-dependent manner. This effect may be explained by a reduction in the availability of arachidonic acid due to simultaneous inhibition of both pathways of arachidonic acid oxygenation. In another, more recent study, cyclobuxine was also found to have a protective effect on myocardial cells against ischemia and reperfusion (in an isolated rat heart model). Cyclobuxine was proven to inhibit the release of ATP metabolites and prevent the release of creatine phosphokinase that is induced by ischemia. Cyclobuxine was in this way able to suppress the damage (myocardial injury) produced by ischemia.

As indicated above, research on animals has been done on the effects of cyclobuxine. However, whether these findings can be extrapolated to other species remains to be seen.
