= Christopher Switzer =

Swiss line engraver and woodcutter

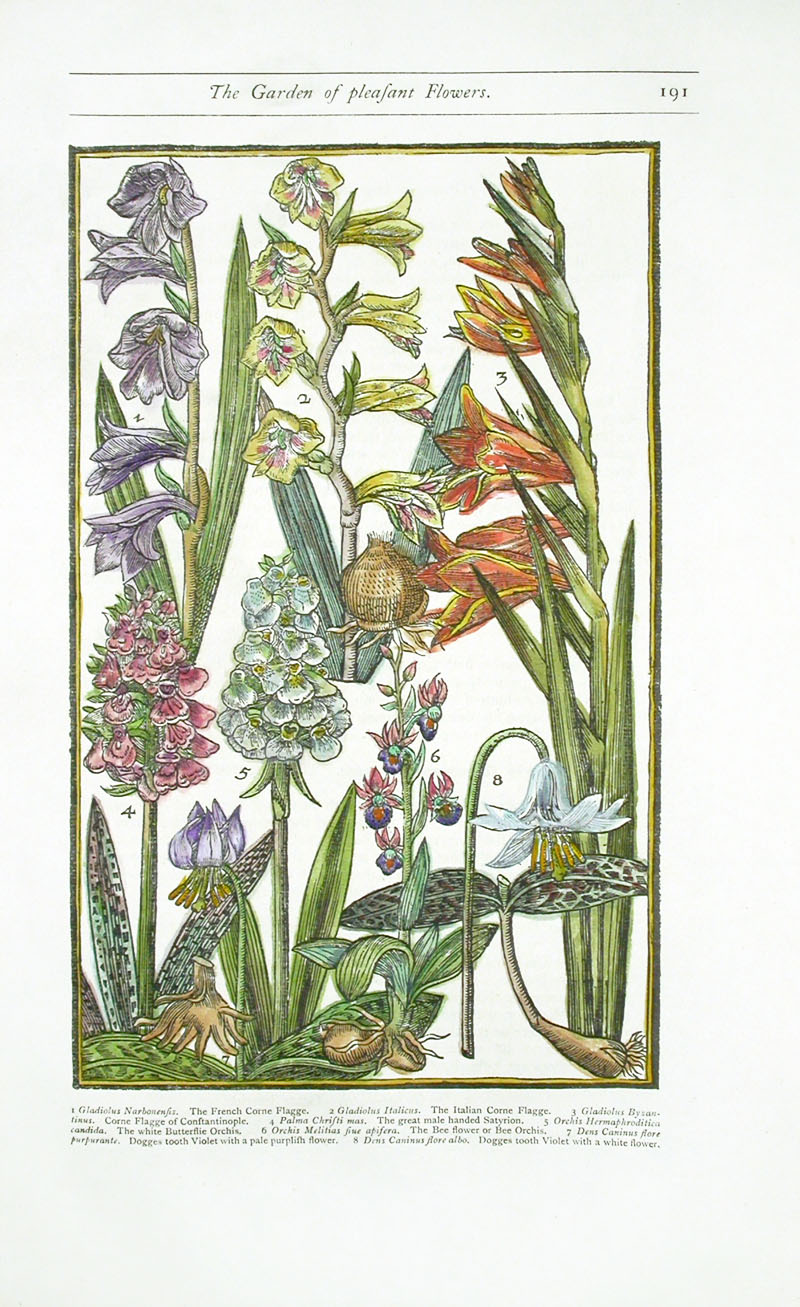

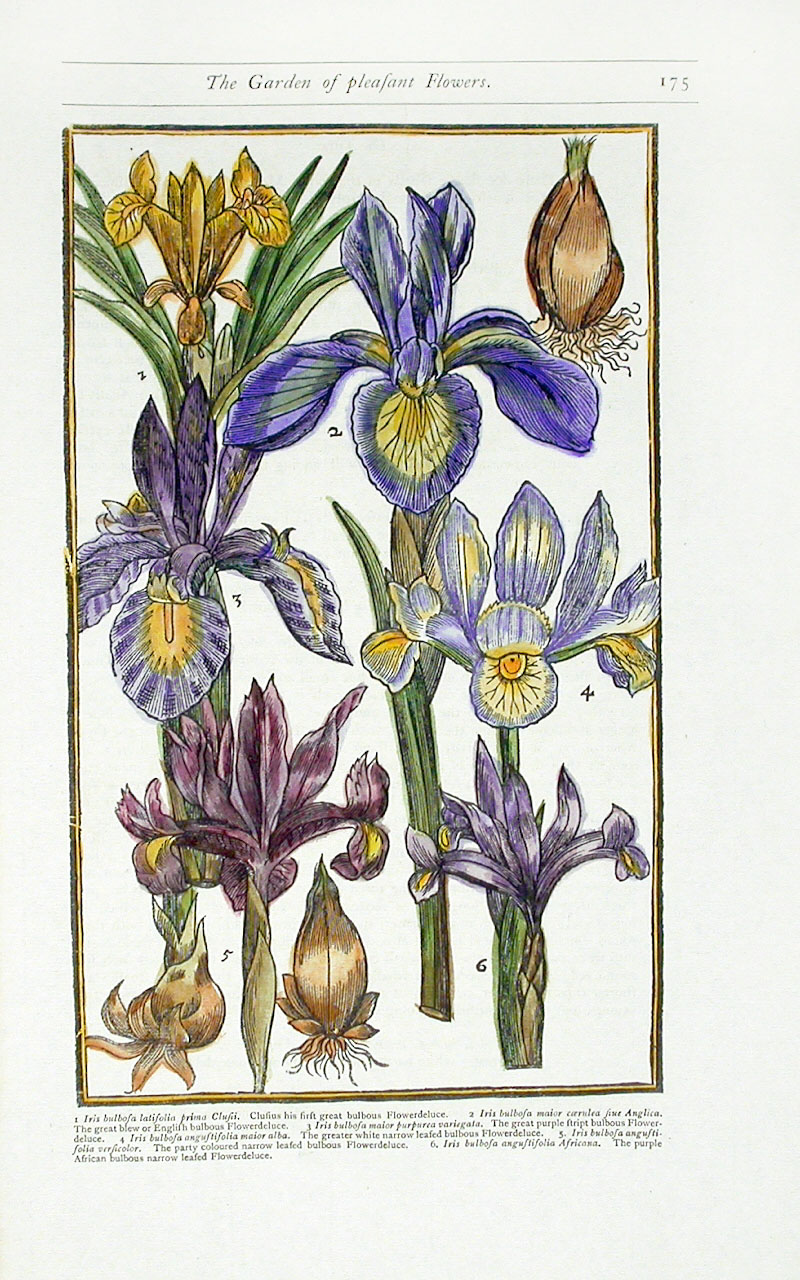

Christopher Switzer^{a} (fl c. 1593–1611) was a Swiss line engraver and woodcutter known for providing the illustrations for Matthias de l'Obel's Stirpium adversaria nova (1571), John Norden (such as his 1595 map of Sussex), John Speed's History of Great Britaine (1611) and John Parkinson's Paradisi in Sole Paradisus Terrestris (1629).

He was acknowledged by John Speed as "the most exquisite and curious hand of our age" for his woodcuts of altars, seals and coins in the margin of Speed's History of Great Britaine in 1661, though John Jackson judged the same woodcuts to "abundantly testify that he [Switzer] was a very ordinary workman" in his Treatise on Wood Engraving in 1839.

Switzer either enjoyed a long career with some of his work published posthumously (such as with Parkinson's Paradisi in Sole Paradisus Terrestris), or the works of a similarly named father and son have been confused. In 1662 John Evelyn wrote that the woodcuts for Parkinson and l'Obel were by the father, with other unnamed works by the son. John Jackson agreed with Evelyn, however in 1839 he asserted that "of the younger Switzer’s abilities I have had no means of judging, never having seen a single cut which was known to be of his engraving".

== Notes ==
a.Arthur M. Hind records the following variations of Christopher's surname; Schweitzer, Schweytzer, Schweizer, Schwytzer, Schwyzer, Shwytzer, Schwitzer, Swytzer, Switzer, Switser and Swister.
