= John Parkinson (botanist) =

English herbalist and botanist (1567–1650)

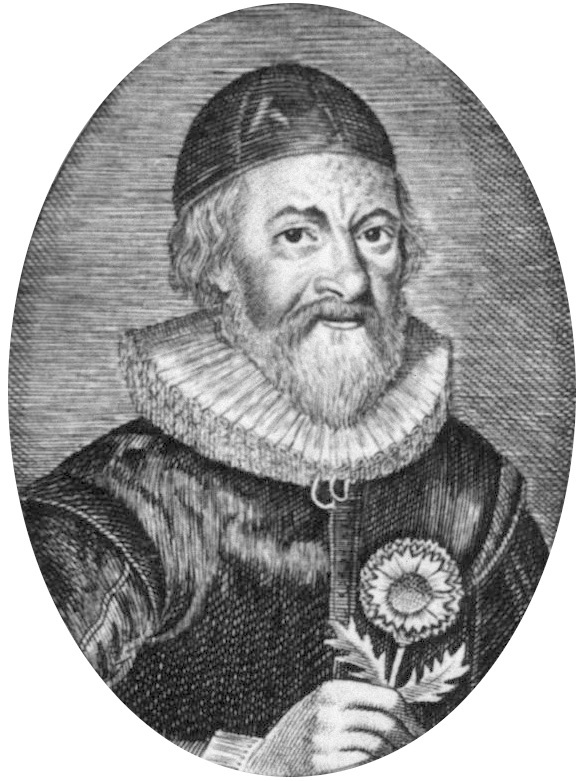
- An engraving of Parkinson from his monumental work Theatrum Botanicum (1640), reprinted in Agnes Arber's Herbals (1912).
- Born: 1567
- Died: Summer 1650 (aged 82–83) ; buried 6 August 1650; Probably London, England
- Known for: Publishing Paradisi in Sole, Paradisus Terrestris (1629) and Theatrum Botanicum (1640)
- Scientific career
- Fields: Herbalism and botany

John Parkinson (1567–1650; buried 6 August 1650) was the last of the great English herbalists and one of the first of the great English botanists. He was apothecary to James I and a founding member of the Worshipful Society of Apothecaries in December 1617, and was later Royal Botanist to Charles I. He is known for two monumental works, Paradisi in Sole Paradisus Terrestris (Park-in-Sun's Terrestrial Paradise, 1629), which generally describes the proper cultivation of plants; and Theatrum Botanicum (The Botanical Theatre or Theatre of Plants, 1640), the most complete and beautifully presented English treatise on plants of its time. One of the most eminent gardeners of his day, he kept a botanical garden at Long Acre in Covent Garden, today close to Trafalgar Square, and maintained close relations with other important English and Continental botanists, herbalists and plantsmen.

== Life ==
Parkinson, born in 1567, spent his early life in Yorkshire. He moved to London at the age of 14 years to become an apprentice apothecary. Rising through the ranks, he eventually achieved the position of apothecary to James I, and a founding member of the Worshipful Society of Apothecaries in December 1617; until 1622 he also served on the Court of Assistants, the Society's governing body. In addition, he assisted the Society in obtaining a grant of arms and in preparing a list of all medicines that should be stocked by an apothecary. He was on the committee that published their Pharmacopœia Londinensis (London Pharmacopœia) in 1618.

Then, on the cusp of a new science, he became botanist to Charles I. Anna Parkinson, a "distant descendant" of Parkinson asserts that in 1625 when Charles I's 15 year old bride, Henrietta Maria of France, came to live at St. James's Palace, "he took on the role of introducing the young queen to horticulturally sophisticated circles." When he summed up his experience in writing Paradisi in Sole Paradisus Terrestris (Park-in-Sun's Terrestrial Paradise, 1629 – "Park-in-Sun" is a pun on "Parkinson"), with the explanatory subtitle A Garden of all sorts of pleasant flowers which our English ayre will permit to be noursed up, it was natural that he dedicated this work, which he called his "Speaking Garden", to the queen. Blanche Henrey called the work the "earliest important treatise on horticulture published in England", while the Hunt catalogue described it as "a very complete picture of the English garden at the beginning of the seventeenth century, and in such delightful, homely, literary style that gardeners cherish it even to the present day."

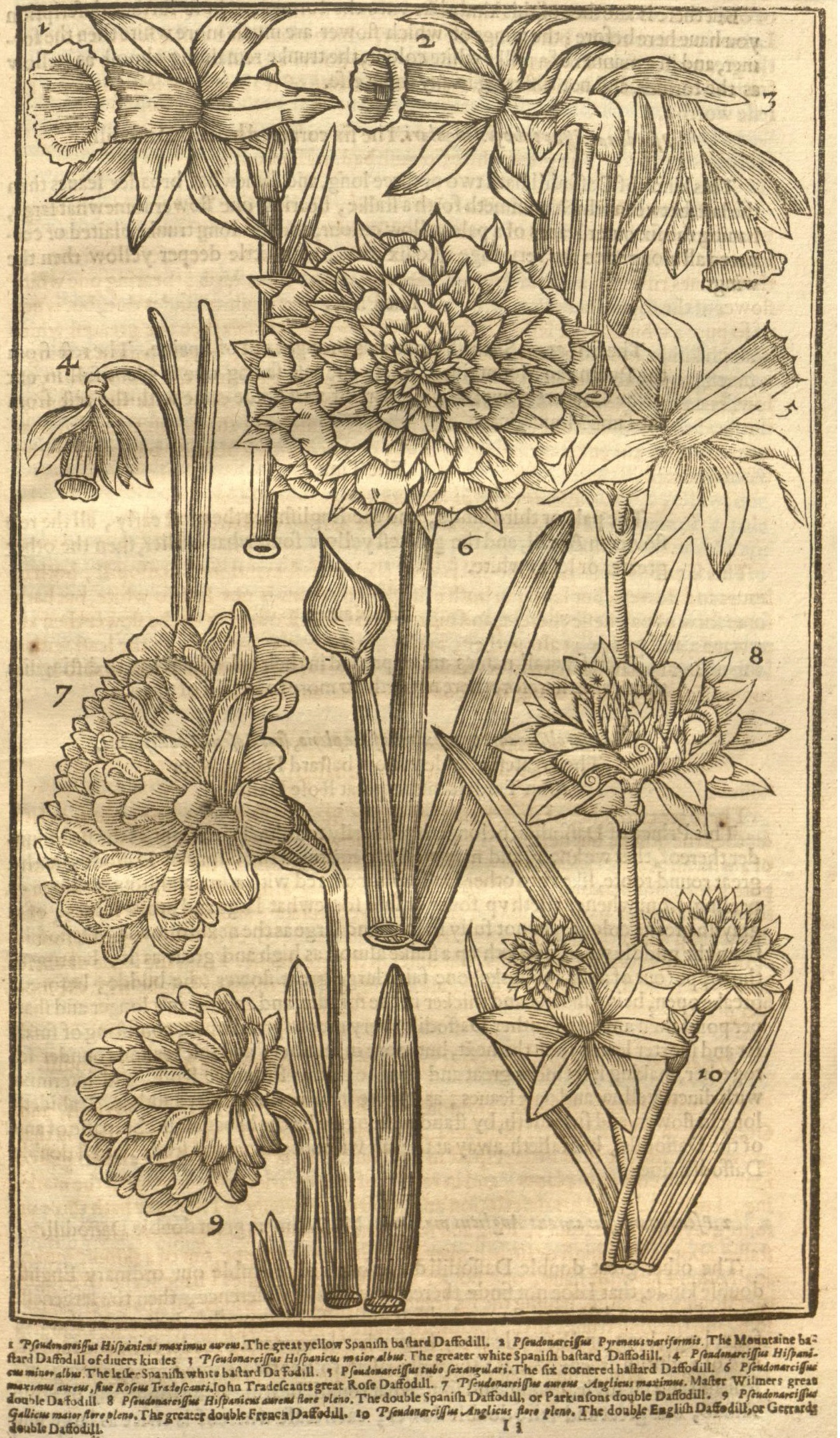
Narcissi, Paradisus Terrestris 1629. 8. Great Double Yellow Spanish Daffodil

Parkinson actively sought new varieties of plants through his contacts abroad and by financing William Boel's plant-hunting expedition to Iberia and North Africa in 1607–1608. He introduced seven new plants into England and was the first gardener in England to grow the great double yellow Spanish daffodil (Pseudonarcissus aureus Hispanicus flore pleno or Parkinson's Daffodil, see illustration). ("I thinke none ever had this kind before myselfe nor did I myself ever see it before the year 1618 for it is of mine own raising and flowering first in my own garden".)

His piety as a Roman Catholic is evident from Paradisi in Sole. In his introduction, Parkinson saw the botanical world as an expression of divine creation, and believed that through gardens man could recapture something of Eden. Nonetheless, a short French poem at the foot of the title page warned the gardener against hubris and in having excessive regard for his efforts, for whoever tries to compare Art with Nature and gardens with Eden "measures the stride of the elephant by the stride of the mite and the flight of the eagle by that of the gnat". However, struggles between Protestants and Catholics compelled Parkinson to keep a low profile. He did not attend any parish church. At the height of his success, the English Civil War (1642–1651) tore his family apart.

Parkinson's London house was in Ludgate Hill, but his botanical garden was in suburban Long Acre in Covent Garden, a district of market-gardens, today close to Trafalgar Square. Not much is known about the garden, but based on a study of the writings of Parkinson and others, John Riddell has suggested that it was at least 2 acres (0.81 ha) in size and probably surrounded by a wall. Four hundred and eighty-four types of plant are recorded as having been grown in the garden. Thomas Johnson and the Hampshire botanist, John Goodyer, both gathered seeds there.

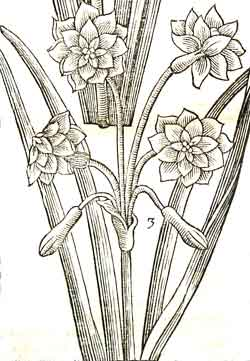
An illustration of a Double Daffodil from the second edition of Paradisi in Sole (1656).

Parkinson has been called one of the most eminent gardeners of his day. He maintained close relations with other important English and Continental botanists, herbalists and plantsmen such as William Coys, John Gerard, John Tradescant the elder (who was a close friend), Vespasian Robin, and the Frenchman Matthias de Lobel (also known as Matthias de L'Obel or Matthaeus Lobelius). Together, they belonged to the generation that began to see extraordinary new plants coming from the Levant and from Virginia, broadly speaking. In his writings, de Lobel frequently mentioned the Long Acre garden and praised Parkinson's abilities. Parkinson, on his part, edited and presented in Theatrum Botanicum the papers of de Lobel, who had spent the final years of his life in Highgate supervising the gardens of Edward la Zouche, the 11th Baron Zouche.

Parkinson died in the summer of 1650, and was buried at St Martin-in-the-Fields, London, on 6 August. He is commemorated in the Central American genus of leguminous trees Parkinsonia. Paradisi in Sole also inspired the children's writer Juliana Horatia Ewing (1841–1885) to write the story Mary's Meadow, which was first published from November 1883 to March 1884 in Aunt Judy's Magazine (1866–1885), produced by her mother Margaret Gatty. In the story, some children read Paradisi in Sole and are inspired to create their own garden. The magazine received much favourable correspondence about the story, and in July 1884 it was suggested that a Parkinson Society should be formed. The objects of the society were to "search out and cultivate old garden flowers which have become scarce; to exchange seeds and plants; to plant waste places with hardy flowers; to circulate books on gardening amongst the Members... [and] to try to prevent the extermination of rare wild flowers, as well as of garden treasures."

== Work ==
Paradisi in Sole Paradisus Terrestris describes the proper cultivation of plants in general, and is in three sections: the flower garden, the kitchen garden, and the orchard garden. It does not include specific growing instructions for each type of plant, but at the start of each main section Parkinson provides instructions on "ordering" each type of garden, advising on situating and laying out a garden, tools, soil improvement, grafting, planting and sowing and the types of plants that should be included in each type of garden.

It contains illustrations of almost 800 plants in 108 full-page plates. Most of these were original woodcuts made by the Swiss artist Christopher Switzer, but others appear to have been copied from the works of Matthias de Lobel, Charles de l'Écluse and the Hortus Floridus of Crispijn van de Passe the Elder.

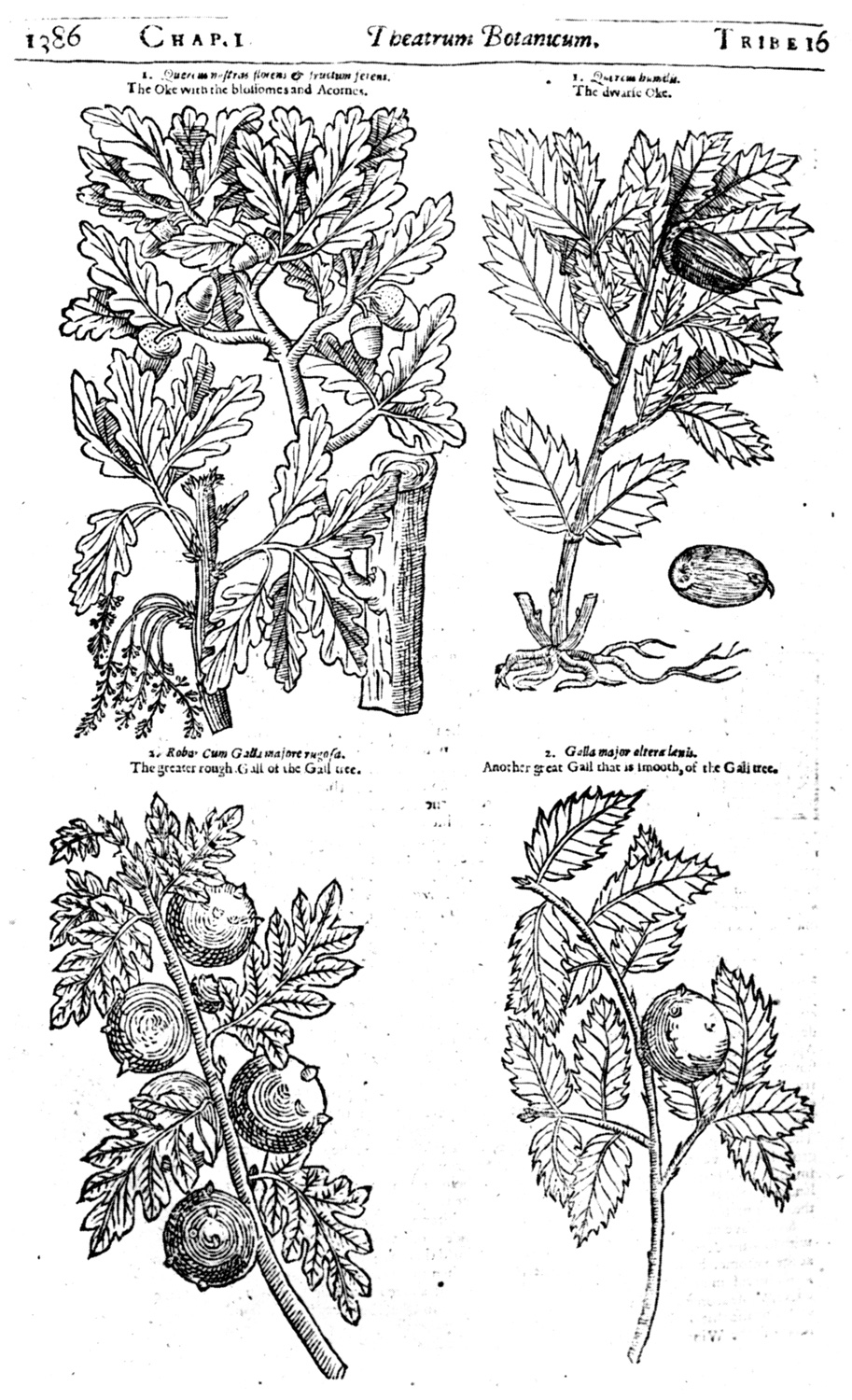
Illustrations of parts of an oak tree from page 1386 of Theatrum Botanicum (1640).

In Paradisi in Sole Parkinson hinted that he hoped to add a fourth section, a garden of simples (medicinal herbs). He delivered the promise in his other great book, the monumental Theatrum Botanicum (The Botanical Theatre or Theatre of Plants) which he published in 1640 at the age of 73 years. The release of this work was delayed due to the popularity of Thomas Johnson's edition of John Gerard's book The Herball or Generall Historie of Plantes (1597). Theatrum Botanicum, with 1,688 pages of text, describes over 3,800 plants and was the most complete and beautifully presented English treatise on plants of its day. It was the first work to describe 33 native plants, 13 of which grew near Parkinson's Middlesex home. Some of these plants, such as the Welsh poppy, were very common, while others grew in limited areas, such as the Strawberry Tree and the Lady's Slipper. However all had gone unnoticed or at least unrecorded. He intended the book to be a reliable guide for apothecaries, and it remained so for more than a hundred years after his death. Parkinson presented the work to Charles I, who conferred on him the title "Botanicus Regis Primarius" ("Royal Botanist of the First Rank") though this came without a salary.

== Published works ==
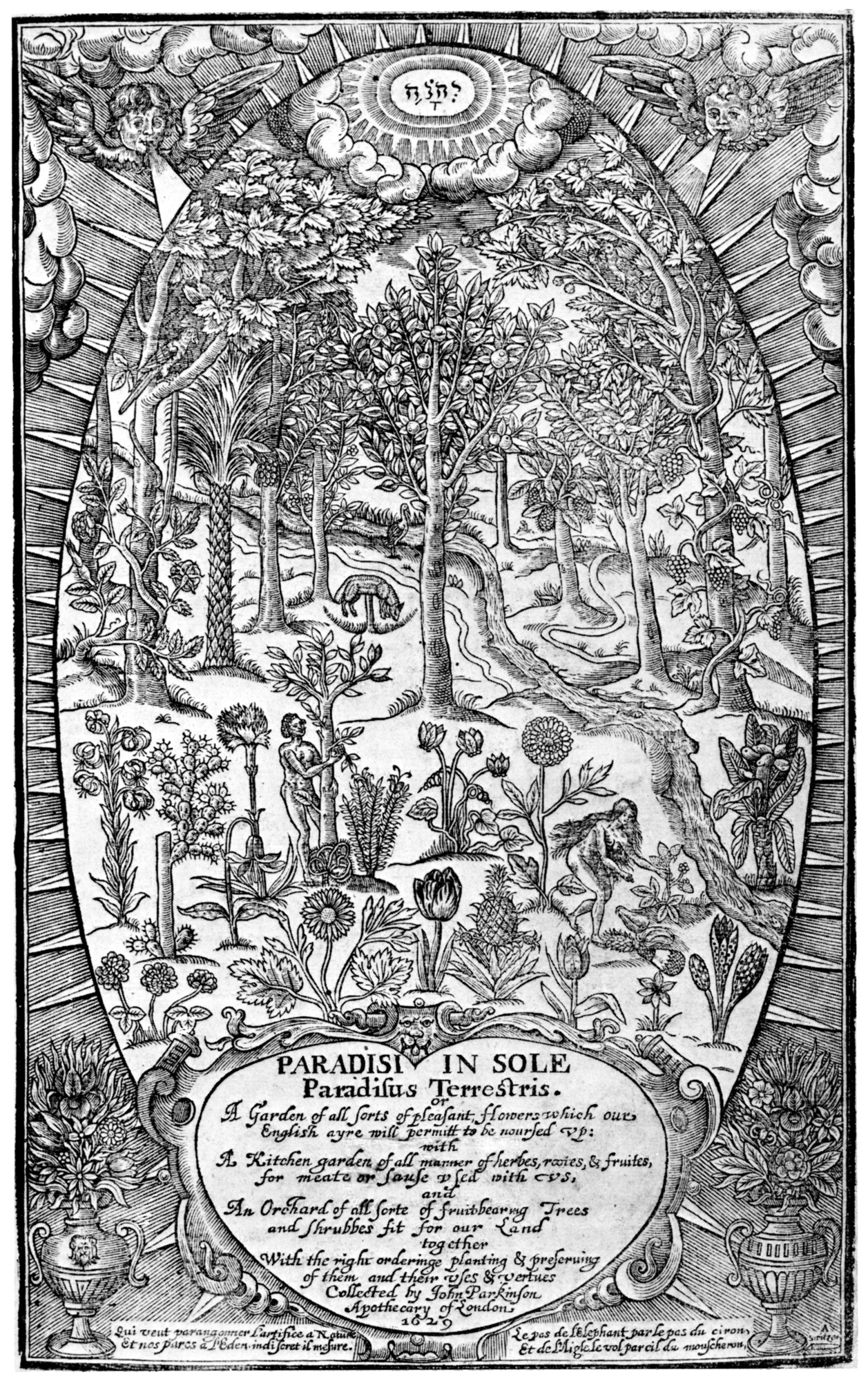
Frontispiece of Paradisi in Sole Paradisus Terrestris (1629) by Swiss artist Christopher Switzer. Of interest is a depiction of a Vegetable Lamb of Tartary near the river behind the figure of Adam.

- Parkinson, John (1629). Paradisi in Sole Paradisus Terrestris: Or A Garden of All Sorts of Pleasant Flowers which our English Ayre will Permitt to be Noursed Vp. With a Kitchen Garden of All Manner of Herbes, Rootes, & Fruites, for Meate or Sause Vsed with Vs, and an Orchard of All Sorte of Fruitbearing Trees and Shrubbes Fit for Our Land. Together with the Right Orderinge, Planting & Preserving of Them and Their Uses and Vertues Collected by Iohn Parkinson Apothecary of London. London: Printed by Hvmfrey Lownes and Robert Yovng at the Signe of the Starre on Bread-Street Hill. doi:10.5962/bhl.title.7100. Folio. In some copies the title page is woodcut; in others it is printed (dated 1635).

Later editions and reprints

  - Parkinson, John (1635) [1629]. Paradisi in Sole Paradisus Terrestris, Or A Garden of All Sorts of Pleasant Flowers which Our English Ayre Will Permit to be Noursed Up ... Together with the Right Ordering, Planting, and Preserving of Them; and Their Uses and Vertues. London: Tho[mas] Cotes and are to be sold by Robert Allot.
  - Parkinson, John (1656). Paradisi in Sole Paradisus Terrestris, or, A Choise Garden of All Sorts of Rarest Flowers with their Nature, Place of Birth, Time of Flowering, Names, and Vertues to Each Plant, Useful in Physic or Admired for Beauty: To which is Annext a Kitchin-Garden Furnished with All Manner of Herbs, Roots, and Fruits, for Meat or Sauce Used with Us, with the Art of Planting an Orchard... All Unmentioned in Former Herbals. London: Printed by R.N. and are to be sold by Richard Thrale at his shop at the signe of the Cross-Keys at S. Pauls-gate, going into Cheap-side. Folio.
  - Parkinson, John; Alfred H. Hyatt (1904). A Garden of Pleasant Flowers: Being a Description of the Most Familiar of Our English Garden Flowers from the Famous Collection of John Parkinson. London: T. N. Foulis.
  - Parkinson, John (1904). Paradisi in Sole Paradisus Terrestris... Faithfully Reprinted from the Edition of 1629. London: Methuen & Co. doi:10.5962/bhl.title.24488.
  - Parkinson, John (1975). Paradisi in Sole Paradisus Terrestris, etc. [The English Experience; no. 758]. Amsterdam; Norwood, N.J.: Theatrum Orbis Terrarum; Walter J. Johnson. Facsimile of the 1629 edition without the letterpress title page, made from copies in the Bodleian Library.
  - Parkinson, John (1976). Paradisi in Sole, etc. New York, N.Y.: Dover Publications. ISBN 0-486-23392-8. Facsimile of the 1629 edition.
  - Parkinson, John (1976). A Garden of Pleasant Flowers. New York, N.Y.; London: Dover Publications; Constable. ISBN 0-486-23392-8.
- Parkinson, John (1640). Theatrum Botanicum: The Theater of Plants. Or, An Herball of a Large Extent: Containing therein a More Ample and Exact History and Declaration of the Physicall Herbs and Plants that are in Other Authours, Encreased by the Accesse of Many Hundreds of New, Rare, and Strange Plants from All the Parts of the World, with Sundry Gummes, and Other Physicall Materials, than hath beene hitherto Published by Any before; and a Most Large Demonstration of their Natures and Vertues. Shevving vvithall the Many Errors, Differences, and Oversights of Sundry Authors that have Formerly Written of Them; and a Certaine Confidence, or most Probable Conjecture of the True and Genuine Herbes and Plants. Distributed into Sundry Classes or Tribes, for the More Easie Knowledge of the Many Herbes of One Nature and Property, with the Chiefe Notes of Dr. Lobel, Dr. Bonham, and Others Inserted therein. Collected by the Many Years Travaile, Industry, and Experience in this Subject, by Iohn Parkinson Apothecary of London, and the Kings Herbarist. And Published by the Kings Majestyes Especiall Priviledge. London: Thomas Cotes. Folio. Reprints:
  - Parkinson, John (1967). A Fragment from Theatrum Botanicum, "or An Herball of a Large Extent". Falls Village, Conn.: Herb Grower Press.
  - Parkinson, John (1982). Theatrum botanicum: Or an Herball of a Large Extente. [S.l.]: Remous.

== Gallery ==
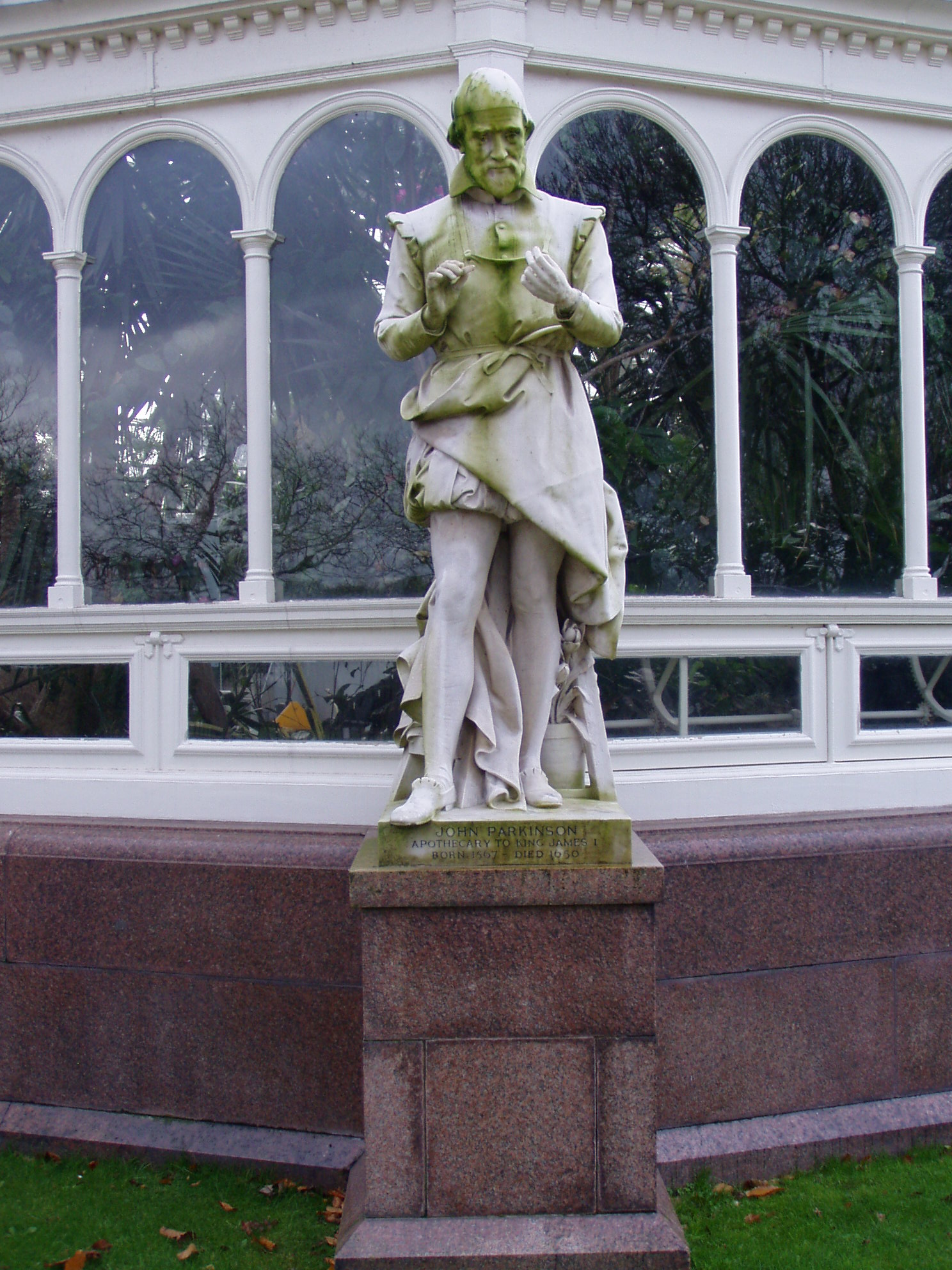
John Parkinson marble by Léon-Joseph Chavalliaud (1899), outside the Palm House at Sefton Park, Liverpool
