= Paradisi in Sole Paradisus Terrestris =

1629 book about gardening

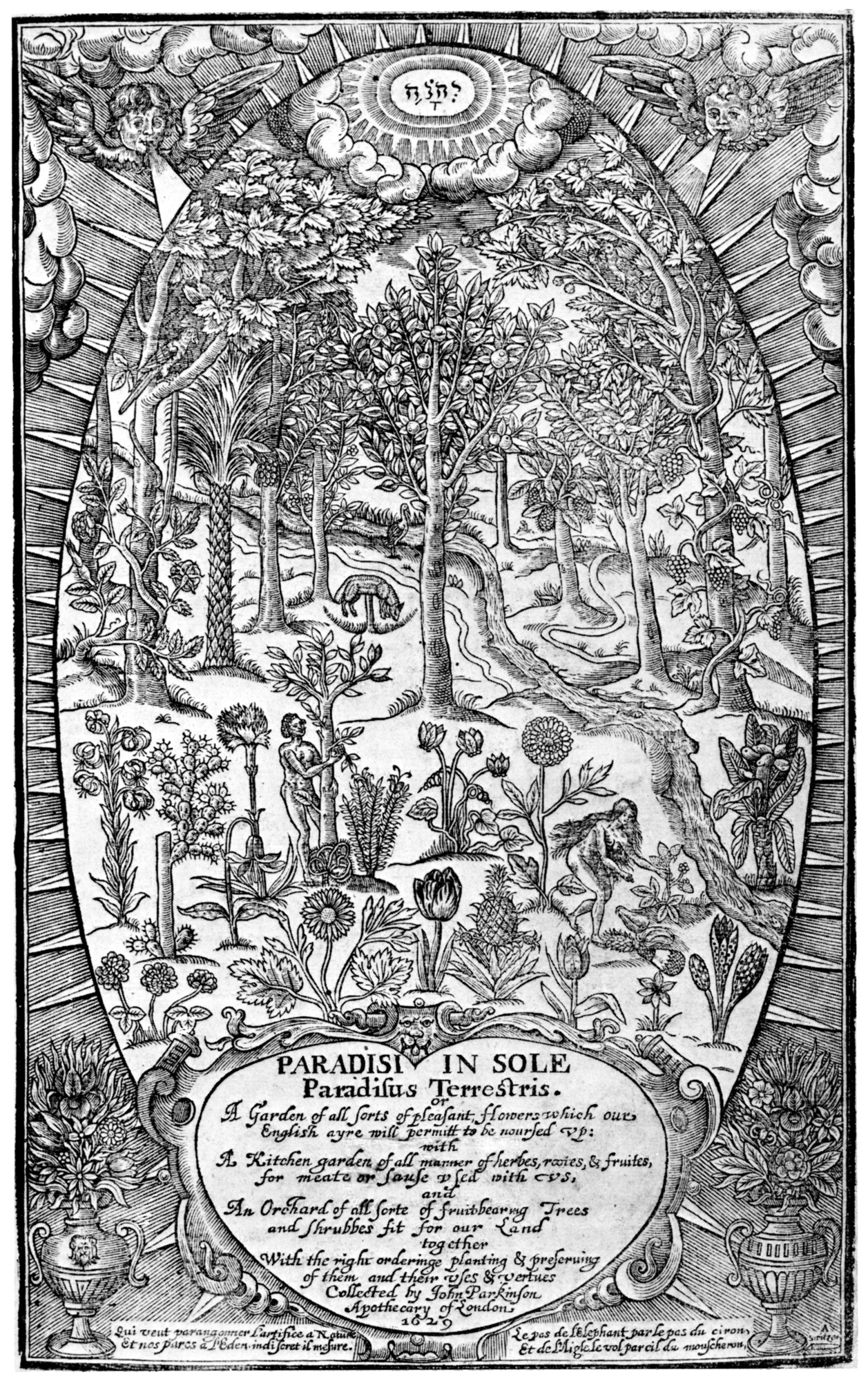
- Frontispiece of 1629 edition
- Author: John Parkinson
- Publication date: 1629
- OCLC: 6977113

Paradisi in Sole Paradisus Terrestris is a work of garden writing by John Parkinson, first published in 1629. Regarded as one of, if not the first, literary works on gardening in England, Paradisi covers nearly 1,000 plants and includes over 100 woodcut illustrations. It combines practical gardening advice with remarks on the beauty of gardens. It is divided into sections for different types of gardens—for food, pleasure, and flowers—outlining Parkinson's views on the best ways to design each of them.

== Publication ==
Paridisi was first published in 1629, dedicated to Queen Henrietta Maria. A folio, it runs to 612 pages (not including several indexes). At the time, it was a luxury good; it is lavishly illustrated and far more expensive than other works on gardens available in the contemporary English book market.

Charles I granted Parkinson the title of "botanicus regius primarius" (roughly, the king's botanist) in recognition of the Paradisi.

Contemporary editions were published in 1656, by "R. N.", and 1669, by H. Lownes and R. Young. Methuen published a reprint edition in 1904. Dover published a facsimile in 1976, with 612 pages including illustrations.

== Content ==
Paradisi is one of the first works on British gardening. Its title is an interlingual pun: "paradisi in sole" means "park in sun" ("Parkinson"). "Paradisus terrestris", or terrestrial paradise, means the Garden of Eden. Eden gives Paradisi its frontispiece.

The work contains 108 full-page woodcut illustrations of plants that grew in Britain at the time, describing almost 1,000 plants in all.

Paradisi is divided into sections for several different kinds of gardens, including the pleasure garden, flower garden, kitchen garden, and orchard garden. Parkinson describes the geographic origin of each of the plants to be included in these types of garden and outlines his view of their appropriate order and structure. For the orchard garden, the correct order or "Modell" is a quincunx.

Throughout Paradisi, Parkinson refers to his friend John Tradescant. Tradescant's copy of the Paradisi is held at the Bodleian Library. It includes references to plants that Tradescant added to his own garden between 1629 and 1633.

== Analysis ==
Paradisi is neither simply an herbal nor a gardening guide. It is also an aesthetic document that celebrates the beauty of flowers. Its aesthetic focus was a novelty, as gardens were traditionally viewed as either sources of food or medicine but not objects of beauty. The literary scholar Rebecca Bushnell views Paradisi as trying to exceed the boundaries of the herbal genre and itemize plants not (solely) according to practical use, but according to their value as ornament. The historian Jill Francis argues that the work is targeted at an elevated "sort", the gentry, and accordingly develops a hierarchy of plants and types, or designs, of garden.

Despite its focus on beauty, however, Paradisi also acknowledges real-world limitations. Just as people have homes that may not be ideal, the garden attached may also not be a complete aesthetic paragon. Leighton calls Parkinson's down-to-earth pragmatism a "radical departure from the contemporary European standard of excellence in garden design".

== Works cited ==
- Bartos, Jim (2010). "The Spirituall Orchard: God, Garden and Landscape in Seventeenth-Century England Before the Restoration". Garden History. 38 (2): 177–193. ISSN 0307-1243. JSTOR 41411753.
- Bushnell, Rebecca Weld (2018). Green Desire: Imagining Early Modern English Gardens. Cornell University Press. ISBN 978-1-5017-2245-5. Project MUSE 59972.
- Francis, Jill (2008). "Order and Disorder in the Early Modern Garden, 1558–c. 1630". Garden History. 36 (1): 22–35. ISSN 0307-1243. JSTOR 25472392.
- Hadfield, Miles (1971). Topiary and Ornamental Hedges: Their History and Cultivation. A & C Black. ISBN 978-0-7136-1193-9.
- Henrey, Blanche (1999) [1975]. British Botanical and Horticultural Literature before 1800. Oxford University Press; Sandpiper Books. ISBN 978-0-19-211548-5.
- Howell, Catherine Herbert (2009). Flora Mirabilis: How Plants Have Shaped World Knowledge, Health, Wealth, and Beauty. National Geographic. ISBN 978-1-4262-0509-5.
- Leighton, Ann (1986). Early American Gardens: For Meate or Medicine. University of Massachusetts Press. ISBN 978-0-87023-530-6.
- Scott-James, Anne (1977). The Pleasure Garden: An Illustrated History of British Gardening. J. Murray. ISBN 978-0-7195-3438-6. OCLC 988248971.
- Sotheby's (1920). Sales Catalogue.
