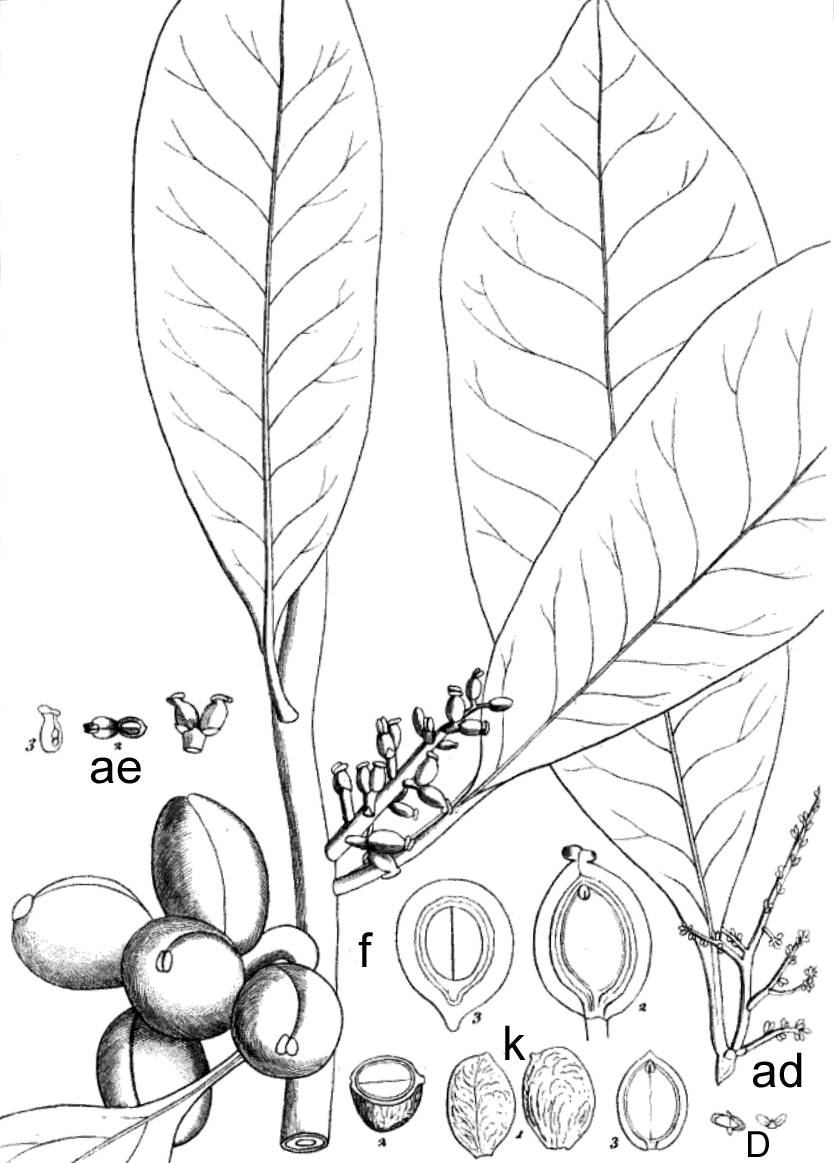
- Labels: ae = pistillate (carpellate, "female") flower, natural size; f = fruit, natural size; k = seed, natural size; ad = staminate ("male") flower, natural size; D = stamens, enlarged

Scientific classification
- Kingdom: Plantae
- Clade: Embryophytes
- Clade: Tracheophytes
- Clade: Spermatophytes
- Clade: Angiosperms
- Clade: Eudicots
- Order: Buxales
- Family: Buxaceae
- Genus: Didymeles; Thouars

Species
- Didymeles integrifolia J.St.-Hil. Didymeles madagascarensis Willd. Didymeles perrieri Leandri

= Didymeles =

Genus of trees

Didymeles is a genus of flowering plants. Though it was formerly treated as the only genus of the family Didymelaceae, it is in the family Buxaceae as in the APG IV system.

The genus Didymeles is restricted to Madagascar and the Comoros. In Madagascar, the two species are found in humid montane habitats, up to 1,500 m, in two disconnected areas in the north-east and south-east of the island. Fossils assignable to this genus have been found in New Zealand, suggesting a much wider distribution in the past.

The conservation status of D. integrifolia has been assessed as of "least concern".

== Description ==
Species are dioecious (i.e. "male" and "female" flowers occur on separate plants). Individual flowers have a very simple structure, without obvious petals or sepals. Female flowers have been interpreted in different ways, either as having two carpels or as occurring close together in pairs, each with a single carpel.

Didymeles species are evergreen trees. The simple leaves are leathery in texture, with untoothed (entire) margins. There are no stipules. The flowers are unisexual, with the two kinds borne on separate plants (i.e. the species are dioecious). The staminate ("male") flowers are arranged in short panicles. Each flower basically consists only of two stamens. The carpellate ("female") flowers are arranged in thyrses (spike-like structures). At the base of the inflorescence there are a number of empty bracts followed by up to 15 bracts arranged in a spiral, each of which is at the base of a side branch of the inflorescence. At the apex of each side branch there is a structure made up of two larger "scales", each with a smaller "scale" at its base, and two carpels, somewhat separated from one another, often with a small "hump" in between. The pollen of Didymeles is distinctive. The grain has three furrows (colpi), as is commonly the case for eudicots; but each colpus then contains two circular openings or pores.

The carpellate flowers have been interpreted differently. When the genus was first described, the two carpels were considered to belong to a single flower, each "female" flower having two carpels just as the "male" flowers had two stamens. This interpretation has been accepted by some later researchers. The "scales" then correspond to tepals of the single flower. The alternative interpretation, preferred by von Balthazar et al., is that there are two flowers very close together, each with a single carpel. Only the smaller "scale" might then correspond to a tepal.

Each carpel has a broad two-crested stigma on a short style, and usually contains a single ovule. The integument – the covering on the outside of the ovule – is in the form of a long coiled tube, an unusual feature in flowering plants. The fruit which forms after fertilization is a fleshy drupe, to which the stigma remains attached.

== Taxonomy ==
=== Genus ===
The genus was first described by Louis-Marie Aubert du Petit-Thouars in 1804. He described the staminate ("male") flowers as composed only of two stamens and the pistillate (carpellate, "female") flowers as composed only of two pistils. For this reason he named the genus from the Greek διδύμος "twin" and μελὲς "members". He described the genus as containing a tree from Madagascar, but did not name the species. In 1805, Jean Henri Jaume Saint-Hilaire established Didymeles integrifolia as the name of the type species of the genus.

Placement in a family was uncertain for a long time: von Balthazar et al. list 9 families or orders it was placed in, or allied with, between 1873 and 1974. Placed in a family of its own, Didymelaceae, it was associated with the Buxaceae from the 1980s onwards, based on chemical, leaf, pollen and wood characters. More recently, molecular phylogenetic studies have repeatedly shown that the genus is sister to the Buxaceae. As of 2017, two treatments are in use. The APG III system of 2009 and the APG IV system of 2016 put Didymeles in the Buxaceae. Other sources keep Didymelaceae as a separate family in the order Buxales.

=== Species ===
The genus consists of three species of evergreen trees.

- Didymeles integrifolia J.St.-Hil. (syns Didymeles excelsa Baill., Didymeles madagascarensis Willd.) — Madagascar, Comoros
- Didymeles madagascarensis Willd. — Madagascar, Comoros
- Didymeles perrieri Leandri — Madagascar

There may also be other species, undescribed as of 2013.

=== Phylogeny ===
One possible evolutionary relationship among the genera of the Buxales is shown below:

- Buxales
  - Didymeles
  - - - Buxus
      - Haptanthus
    - - Sarcococca
      - - Pachysandra
        - Styloceras
