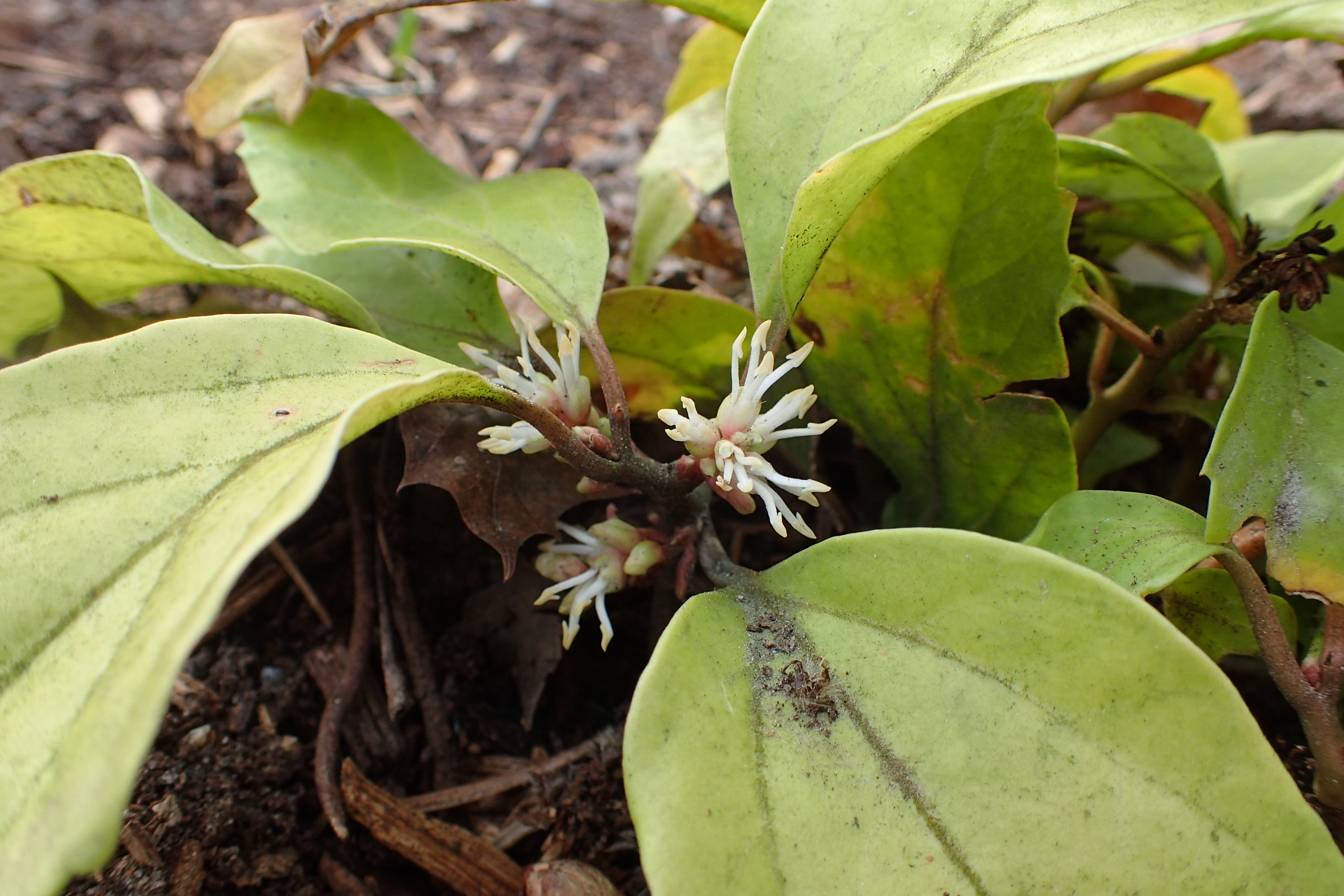
- Closeup— inflorescence and foliage.

Scientific classification
- Kingdom: Plantae
- Clade: Tracheophytes
- Clade: Angiosperms
- Clade: Eudicots
- Order: Buxales
- Family: Buxaceae
- Genus: Pachysandra
- Species: P. axillaris

Binomial name
- Pachysandra axillaris Franchet, Pl. Delavay

= Pachysandra axillaris =

Species of flowering plant

Pachysandra axillaris is a species of plant in the family Buxaceae. In its native China, it is known as 板凳果 (Bǎndèng guǒ).

== Description ==
- Height: Reaches 30-50 cm at maturity.
- Leaves: Leaves range in shape from ovate to oblong, are finely hairy (tomentose) along the midrib and lateral veins, and measure 5-16 cm in length by 3-10 cm in width.
- Flowers: Flower colour ranges from white to red, and the inflorescences range from erect or pendulous.
- Fruit: Measuring about 1 mm in diameter, the spherical fruits range in colour from yellow to reddish purple when ripe.

== Range and distribution ==
Native to China, including Fujian, Guangdong, Jiangxi, Shaanxi, Sichuan, and Yunnan provinces. Also occurs in Taiwan.

== Varieties ==
Two varieties of these species are known to botanists: P. axillaris var. axillaris, and P. axillaris var. stylosa.

== Etymology ==
Pachysandra is derived from the Ancient Greek word παχύς (pachýs, 'thick') and the Neo-Latin -androus ('of or pertaining to stamens'), and means 'thick stamens'. It was named in reference to its stout filaments.

Axillaris is Latin, literally meaning 'in the armpit' but more figuratively meaning 'arising from leaf axils' or 'axillary'.
