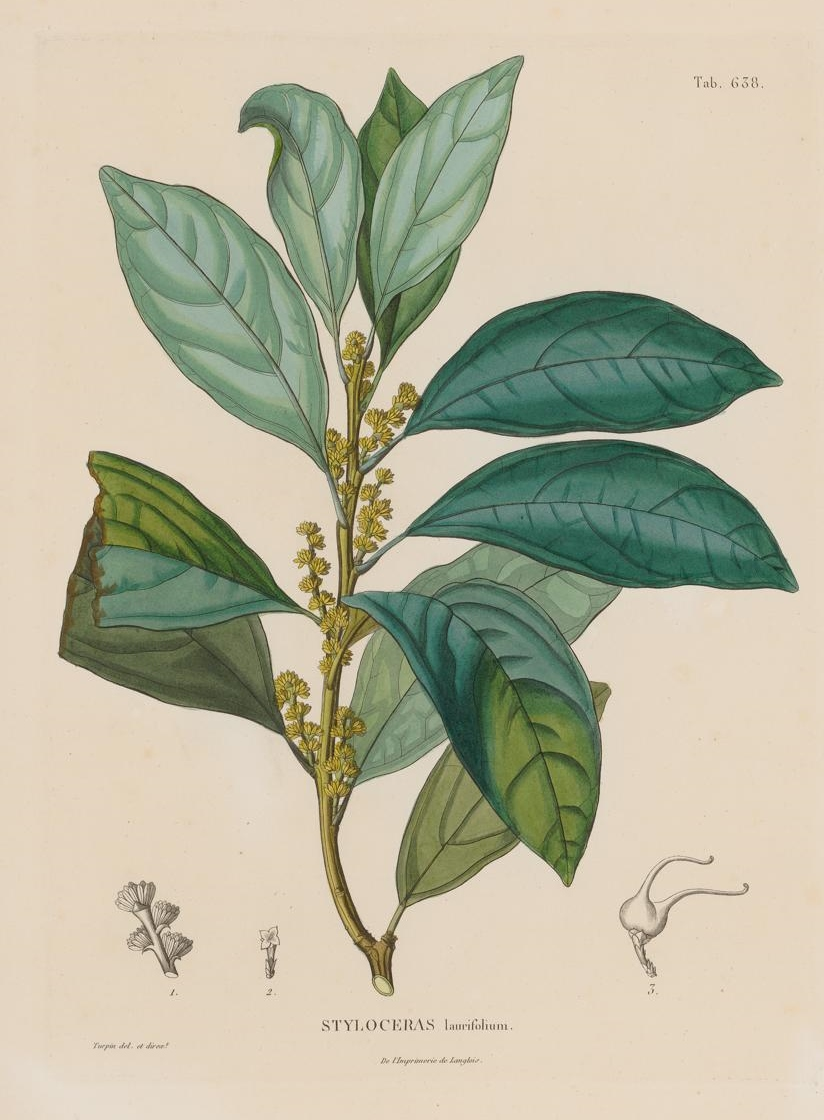

Scientific classification
- Kingdom: Plantae
- Clade: Tracheophytes
- Clade: Angiosperms
- Clade: Eudicots
- Order: Buxales
- Family: Buxaceae
- Genus: Styloceras
- Species: S. laurifolium

Binomial name
- Styloceras laurifolium (Willd.) Kunth

Synonyms
- Trophis laurifolia Willd.

= Styloceras laurifolium =

Species of tree

Styloceras laurifolium is a species of tree in the family Buxaceae. It is found in South America.
