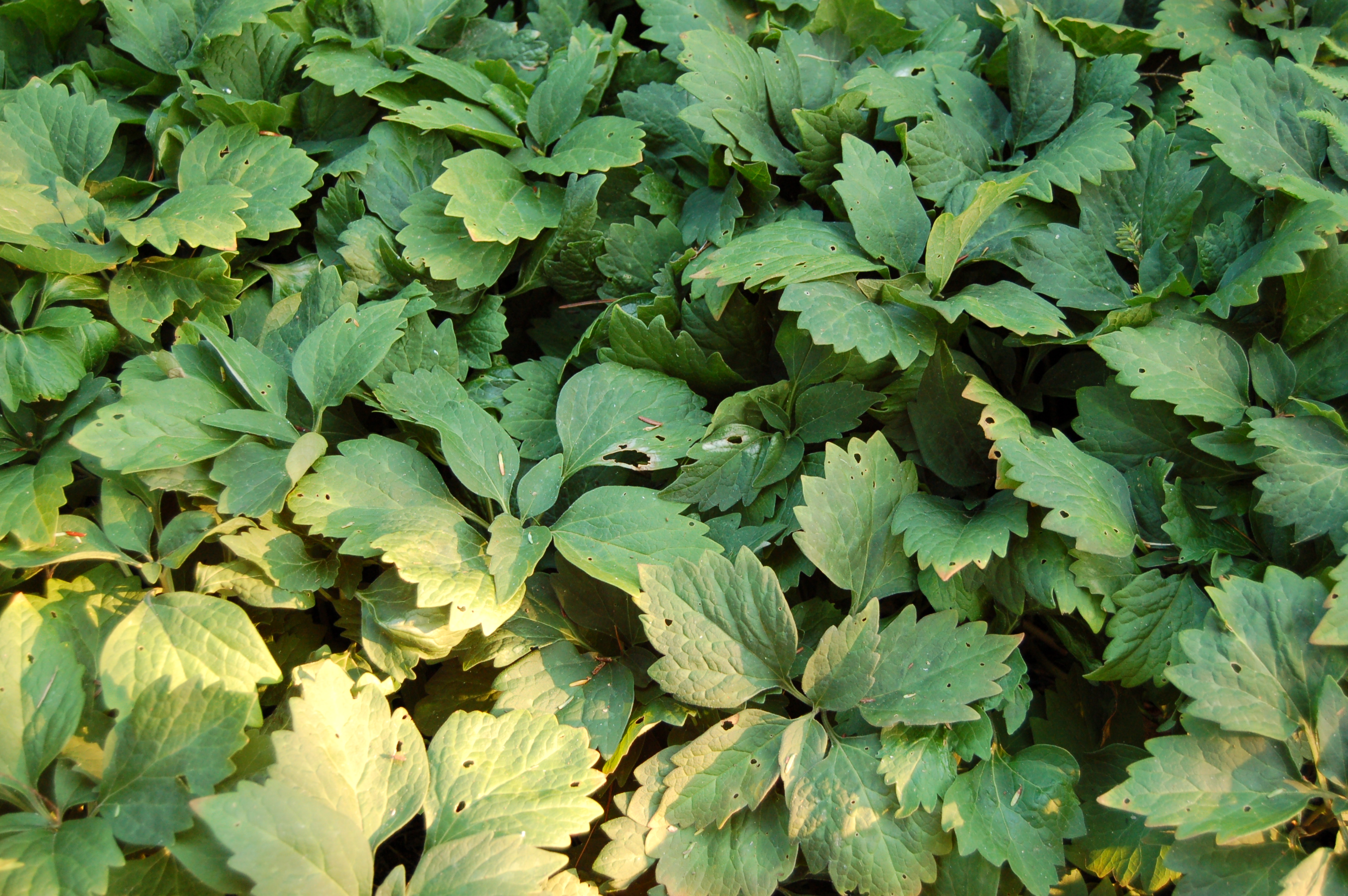

Scientific classification
- Kingdom: Plantae
- Clade: Tracheophytes
- Clade: Angiosperms
- Clade: Eudicots
- Order: Buxales
- Family: Buxaceae
- Genus: Pachysandra
- Species: P. procumbens

Binomial name
- Pachysandra procumbens Michx.

Synonyms
- Pachysandra erecta (Baillon)

= Pachysandra procumbens =

Species of flowering plant

Pachysandra procumbens, the Allegheny pachysandra or Allegheny spurge, is a flowering plant in the family Buxaceae, native to the southeast United States from West Virginia and Kentucky south to Florida, and west to Louisiana. The name Allegheny is sometimes spelled Alleghany.

It is an evergreen subshrub, growing to at most 30 cm high, usually less. The leaves are 5–10 cm long, with a coarsely toothed margin. The flowers are small, white, produced several together on a terminal raceme 2–3 cm long.

== Description ==
Pachysandra procumbens is a shrubby ground cover which grows 8-12" tall and spreads indefinitely by rhizomes to form a dense carpet of matte blue-green leaves mottled with purple and white. It is native to woodlands from North Carolina and Kentucky south to Florida and Texas. Ovate to suborbicular leaves (to 3" long) are coarsely toothed at the apex but untoothed at the base. Leaves are typically deciduous in USDA Zones 5 and 6 but semi-evergreen to evergreen in Zones 7 to 9. Even where evergreen, the leaves may appear worn and tattered by mid winter. Tiny, fragrant, greenish white to white flowers bloom in terminal spikes (2-4" long) in early spring before the new leaves arrive.

Genus name comes is in reference to the male parts of the flower (thick stamens). Specific epithet from Latin means trailing in reference to the rhizomatous ground cover habit.

It spreads slowly to form a dense carpet 8-10” tall. Allegheny pachysandra performs well in a variety of soils from moist to dry and a range of soil pH as long as it is growing in partial to full shade. This woodland plant is also considered by many to be very deer and drought resistant.

== Gallery ==
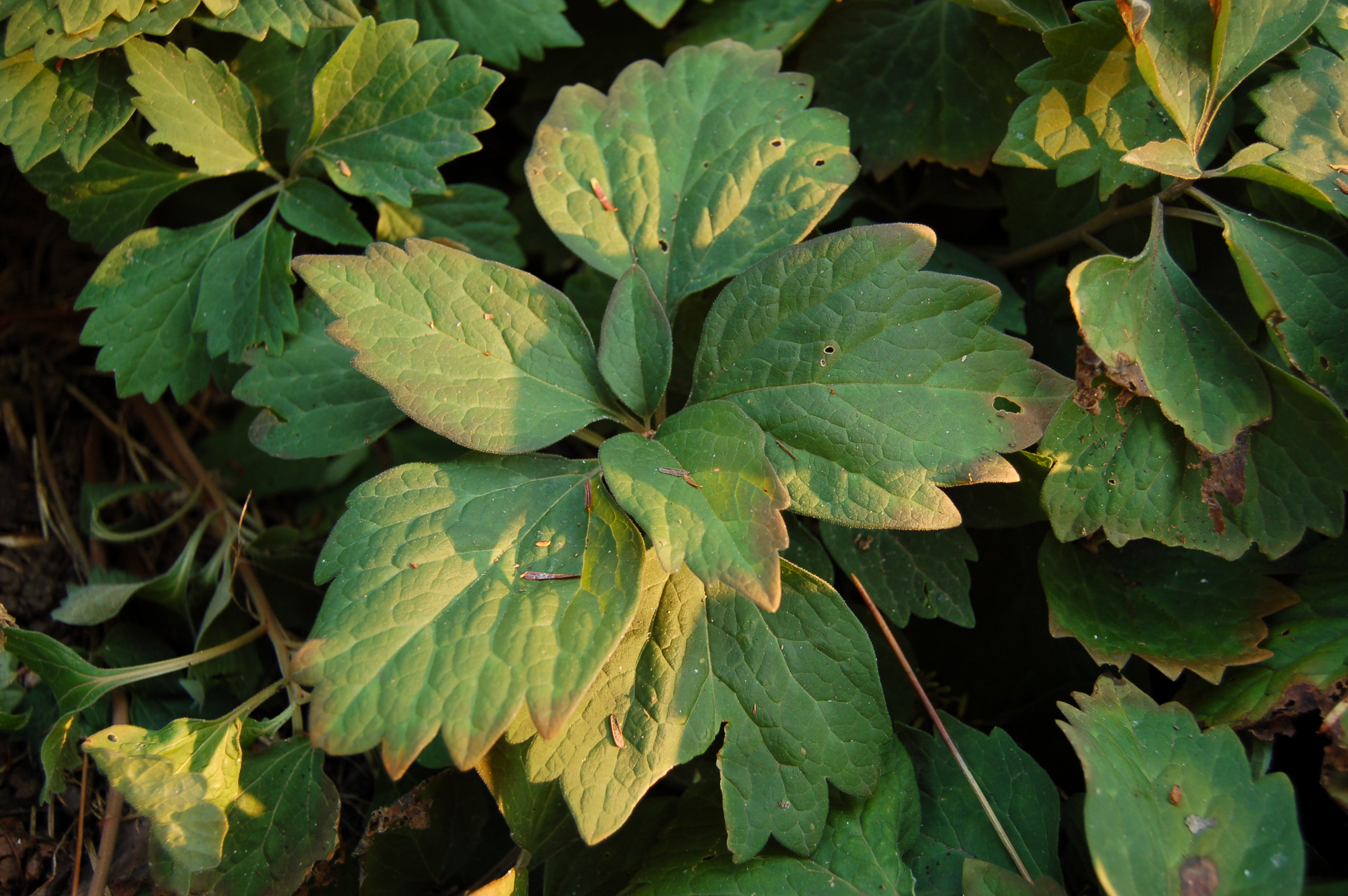
A leaf cluster

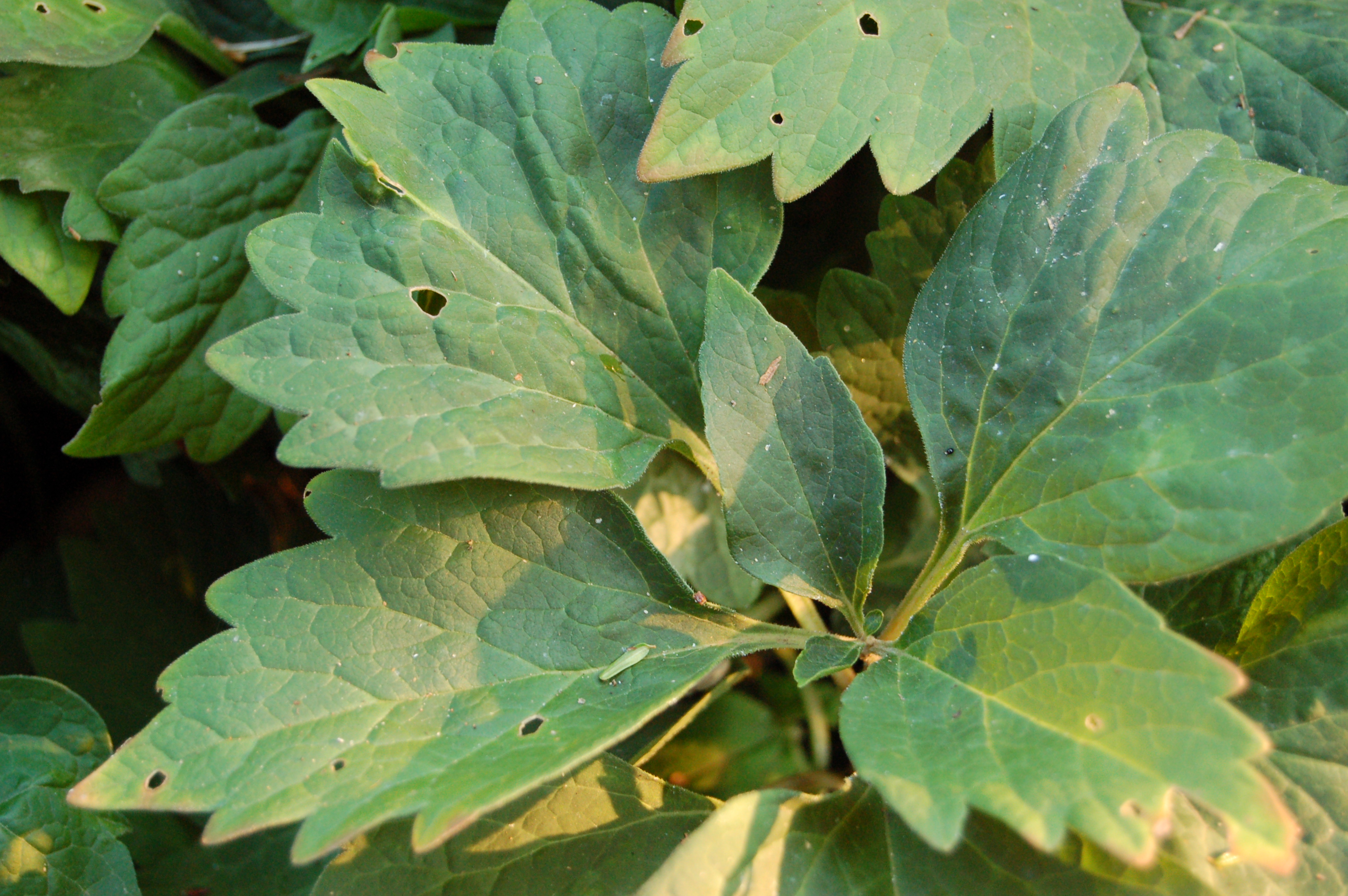
Leaves

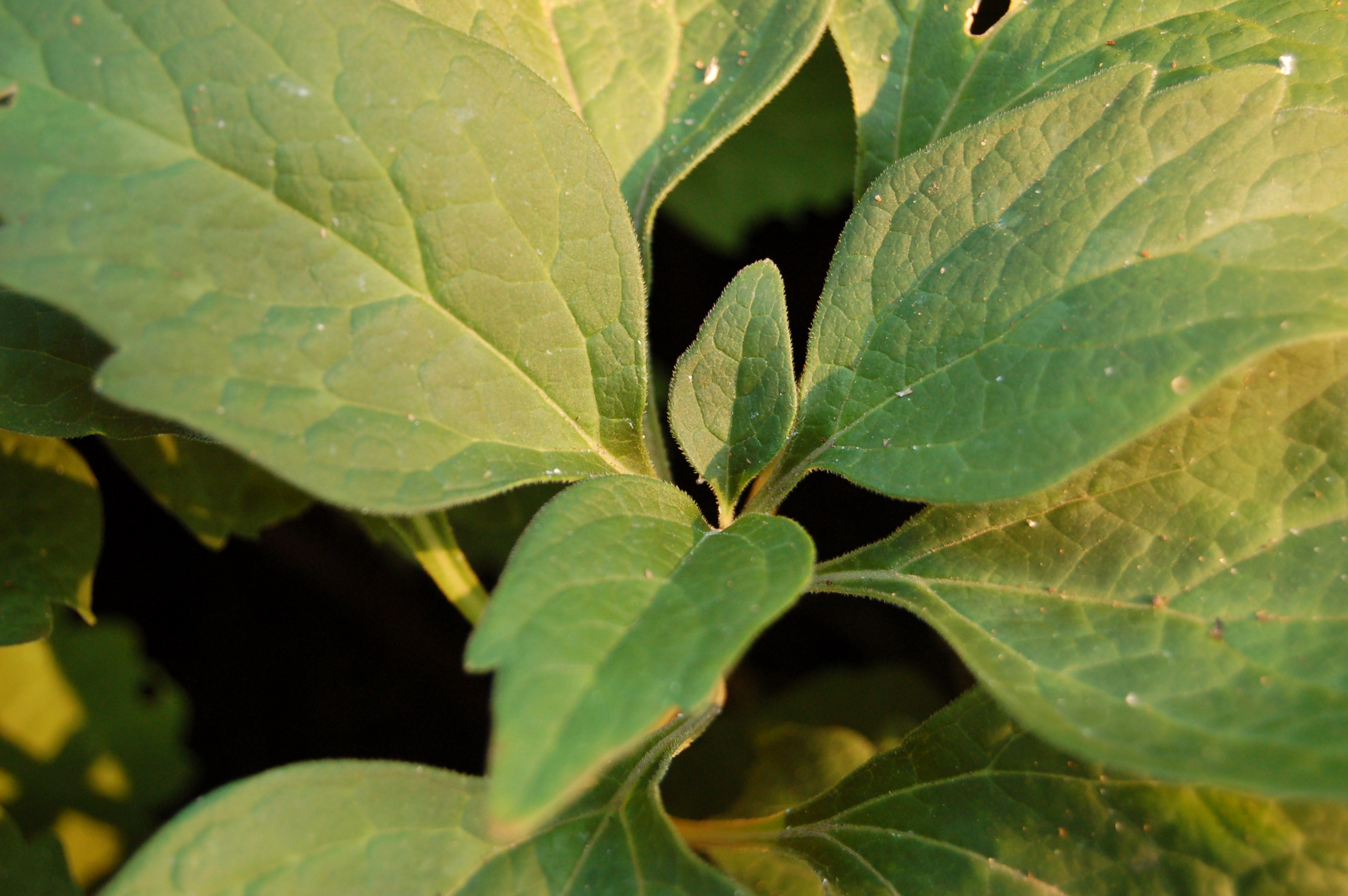
Closeup of the leaves

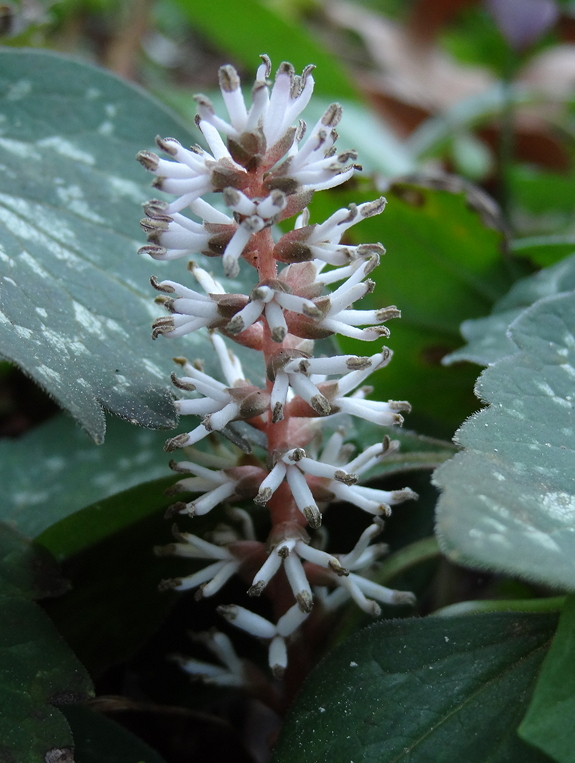
Closeup of flower

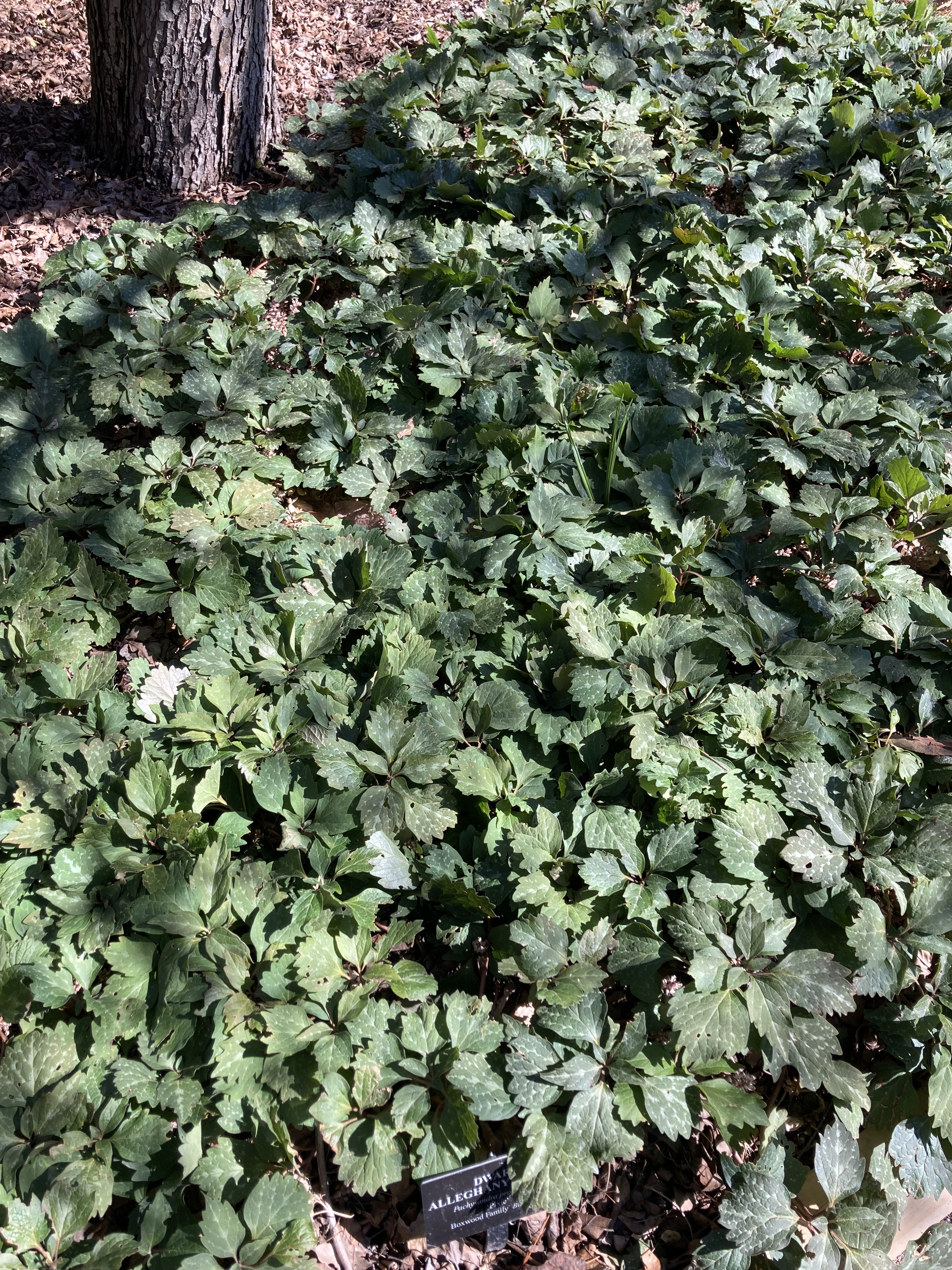
Pachysandra procumbens in the Cornell Botanic Gardens.
