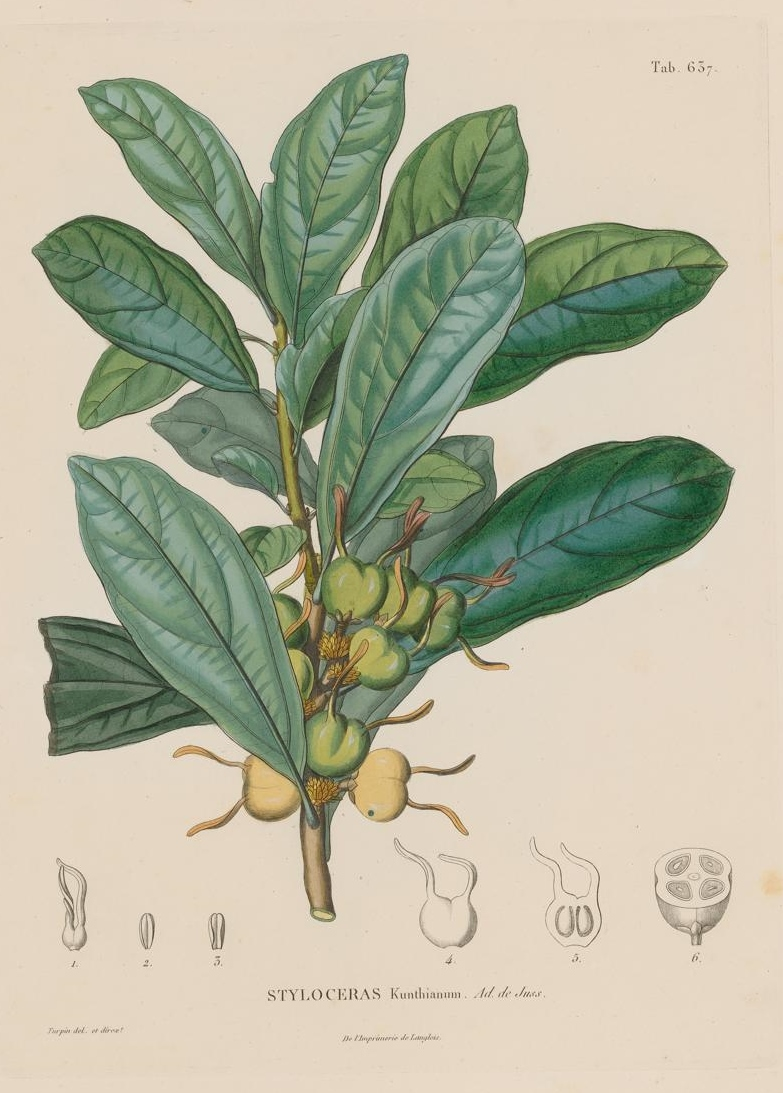

Conservation status
- Endangered (IUCN 3.1)

Scientific classification
- Kingdom: Plantae
- Clade: Tracheophytes
- Clade: Angiosperms
- Clade: Eudicots
- Order: Buxales
- Family: Buxaceae
- Genus: Styloceras
- Species: S. kunthianum

Binomial name
- Styloceras kunthianum Juss.

= Styloceras kunthianum =

Species of flowering plant

Styloceras kunthianum is a species of plant in the family Buxaceae. It is endemic to Ecuador. Its natural habitat is subtropical or tropical moist montane forest. It is threatened by habitat loss.
