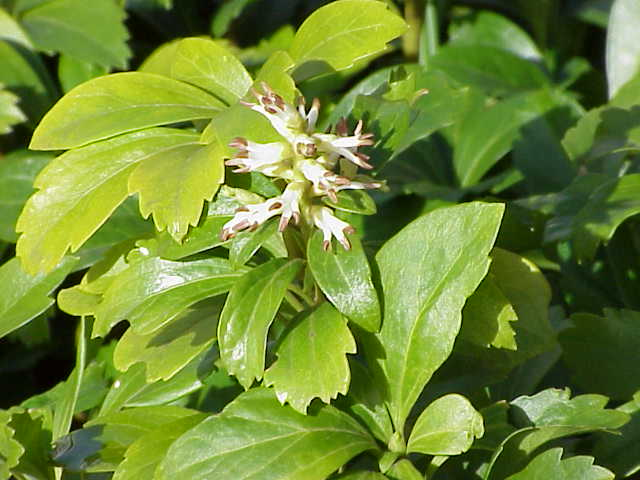
- Closeup—inflorescence and foliage.

Scientific classification
- Kingdom: Plantae
- Clade: Tracheophytes
- Clade: Angiosperms
- Clade: Eudicots
- Order: Buxales
- Family: Buxaceae
- Genus: Pachysandra
- Species: P. terminalis

Binomial name
- Pachysandra terminalis Siebold & Zucc.

= Pachysandra terminalis =

Species of flowering plant

Pachysandra terminalis, the Japanese pachysandra, carpet box or Japanese spurge, is a species of flowering plant in the boxwood family Buxaceae, native to Japan, Korea and China and introduced to eastern North America. It is a slow-growing, spreading evergreen perennial growing to 10 cm (4 in) tall by 60 cm (24 in) broad, with alternate, simple, glossy leaves, and creeping stems. The leaves may yellow in direct sunlight or in winter. When growing in a spreading mass of many plants, a dense cover is formed.

The flowers are white, borne above the foliage. In temperate Northern Hemisphere sites they appear late in the month of March and throughout the month of April. The plant is very cold hardy.

The specific epithet terminalis means "ending", and refers to the clusters of leaves which appear at the end of the short stems.

== Cultivation ==
Pachysandra terminalis is cultivated as an ornamental plant, for use as a massed groundcover, low grouped element, or accent plant in the ground. It is a suitable lower plant for container gardening, and shaded or "northside" window boxes. It takes about three years to establish a solid groundcover in suitable climates, when new plantings are spaced 15–30 cm (6–12 in) apart. It spreads by new stems sprouting from the spreading root system.

The plant prefers a moist and well-drained soil that is both acidic and rich. A humus amended loam (acidic pH) soil, with regular organic fertilizer applications and watering-rainfall is optimal. However, the plant is tolerant of neutral to slightly alkaline pH soils, and to periodic dryness, especially in humid and non-arid climates.

=== Cultivars ===
Numerous cultivars have been developed for garden use, of which 'Variegata' has gained the Royal Horticultural Society's Award of Garden Merit.

=== Propagation ===
Pachysandra terminalis can be propagated by dividing and transplanting clumps, by rooting stem cuttings, or by removing seedlings that have grown through the spread of roots from the main flower.

== Invasiveness ==
While Pachysandra terminalis is considered highly invasive in the United States and Canada, this is usually vegetative spread from individual planting sites, as it rarely self-seeds. Brought to North America from Asia as an ornamental groundcover, it spreads aggressively via underground rhizomes. It forms dense, evergreen mats that expand across property lines, crowding out native species and altering forest ecosystems. There are many native groundcovers that can be substituted for Japanese pachysandra.
