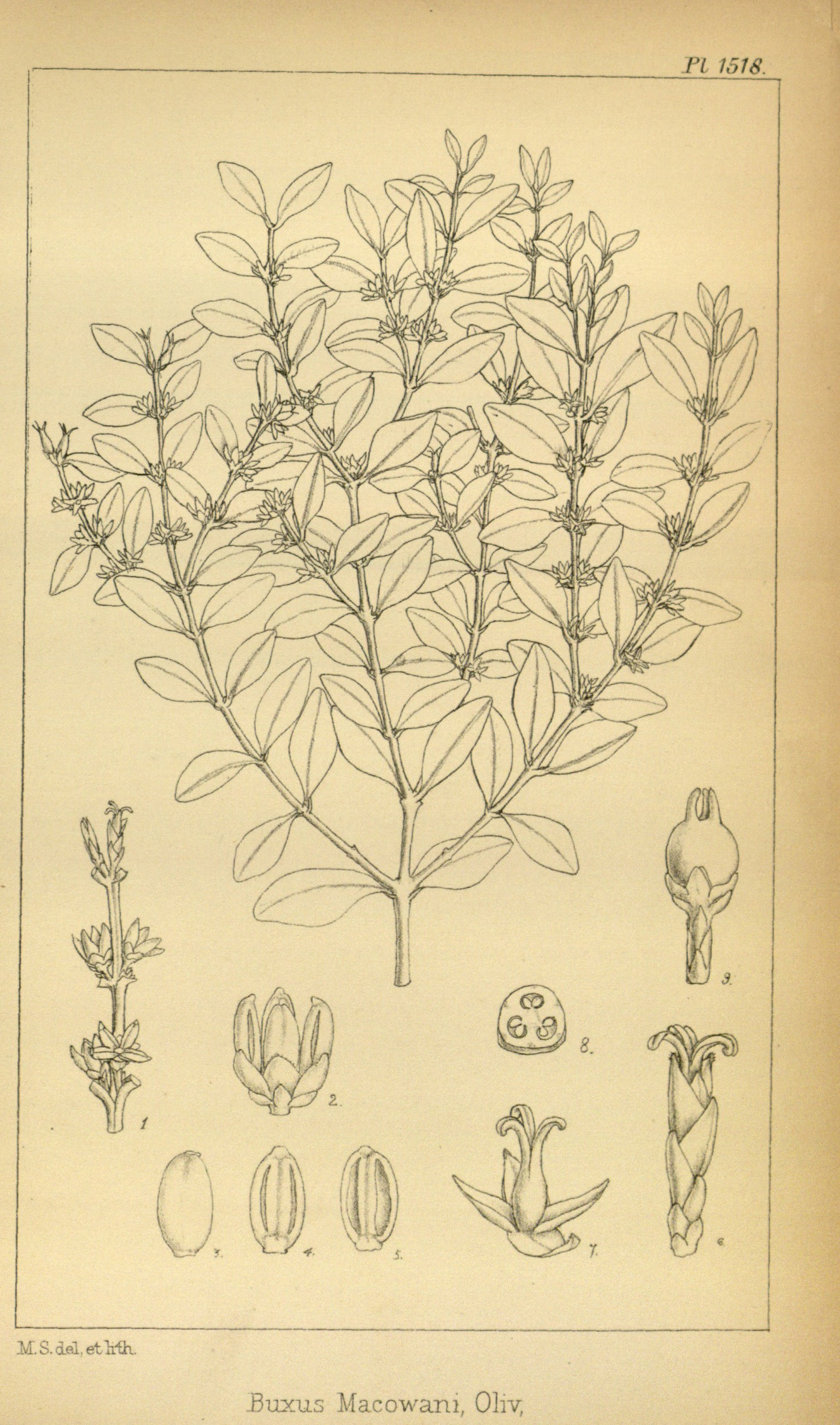
- Plate by Matilda Smith (1854–1926)

Scientific classification
- Kingdom: Plantae
- Clade: Embryophytes
- Clade: Tracheophytes
- Clade: Spermatophytes
- Clade: Angiosperms
- Clade: Eudicots
- Order: Buxales
- Family: Buxaceae
- Genus: Buxus
- Species: B. macowanii

Binomial name
- Buxus macowanii Oliv. (1886)

Synonyms
- Buxella macowanii (Oliv.) Tiegh.; Notobuxus macowanii (Oliv.) E. Phillips

= Buxus macowanii =

Species of tree

Buxus macowanii, a.k.a. Cape box, is an evergreen species of boxwood endemic to South Africa, where it occurs in two disjunct populations - in coastal forest and shady ravines from the Eastern Cape to southern Natal, and in the Waterberg of the central Transvaal. The genus Buxus, comprising more than 100 species, is found worldwide, but is absent from Australia.

Cape box is a small, evergreen, slow-growing tree reaching about 10m in height, with glabrous, opposite and entire leaves, some 2.5 cm long. Fruit spherical and trilete, crowned by the 3 persistent styles or horns.

The species' commercial value was first realised in 1884 when David Hutchins, the Conservator of Forests in King William's Town, reported "the coast forests have come into notice during the year, by the discovery that the so-called Cape box is of value for engraving and other purposes for which real boxwood is used. The area of box-producing forest in the Buffalo River valley is estimated at fifteen square miles. Box also occurs in the valley of the Keiskama River, near the coast, but has not as yet been detected west of this in the valleys of the Fish River, Kowie River and the Bushman's River".

The specific name honours Peter MacOwan, who received specimens of the plant from Hutchins and passed them on to Hooker - the word 'buxus' is ancient Latin for the boxwood tree.

== Gallery ==
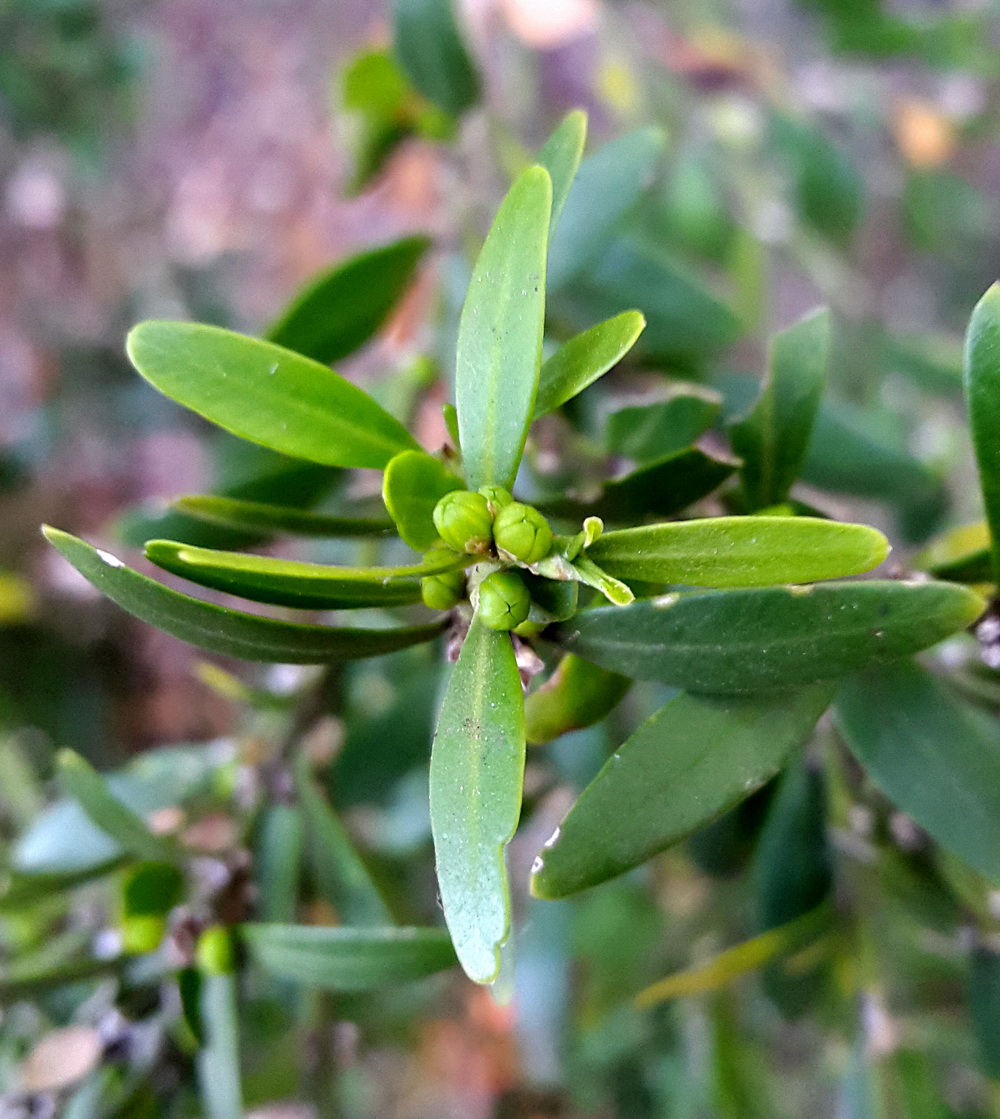
Male flower buds

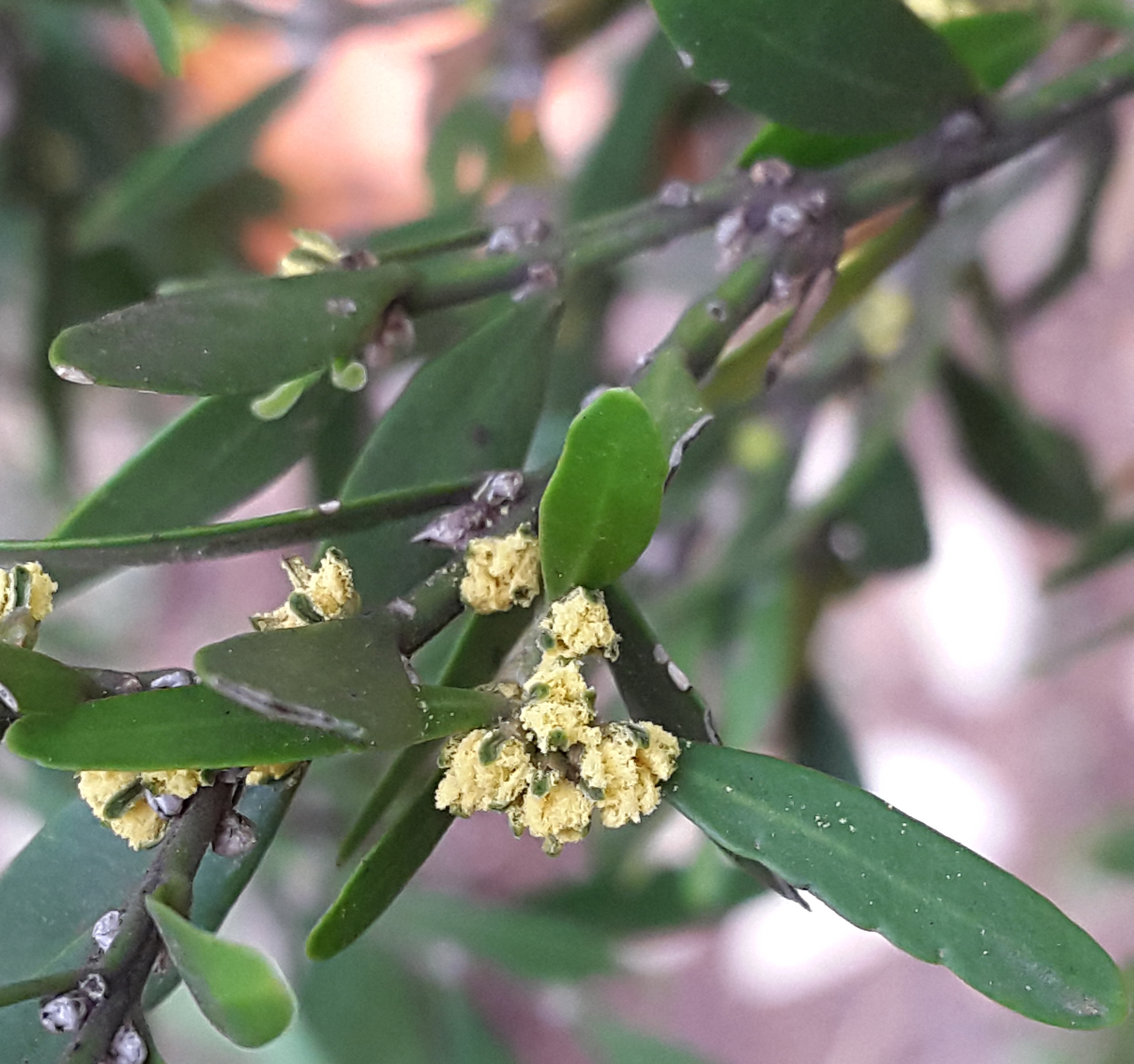
Male flowers - pollen
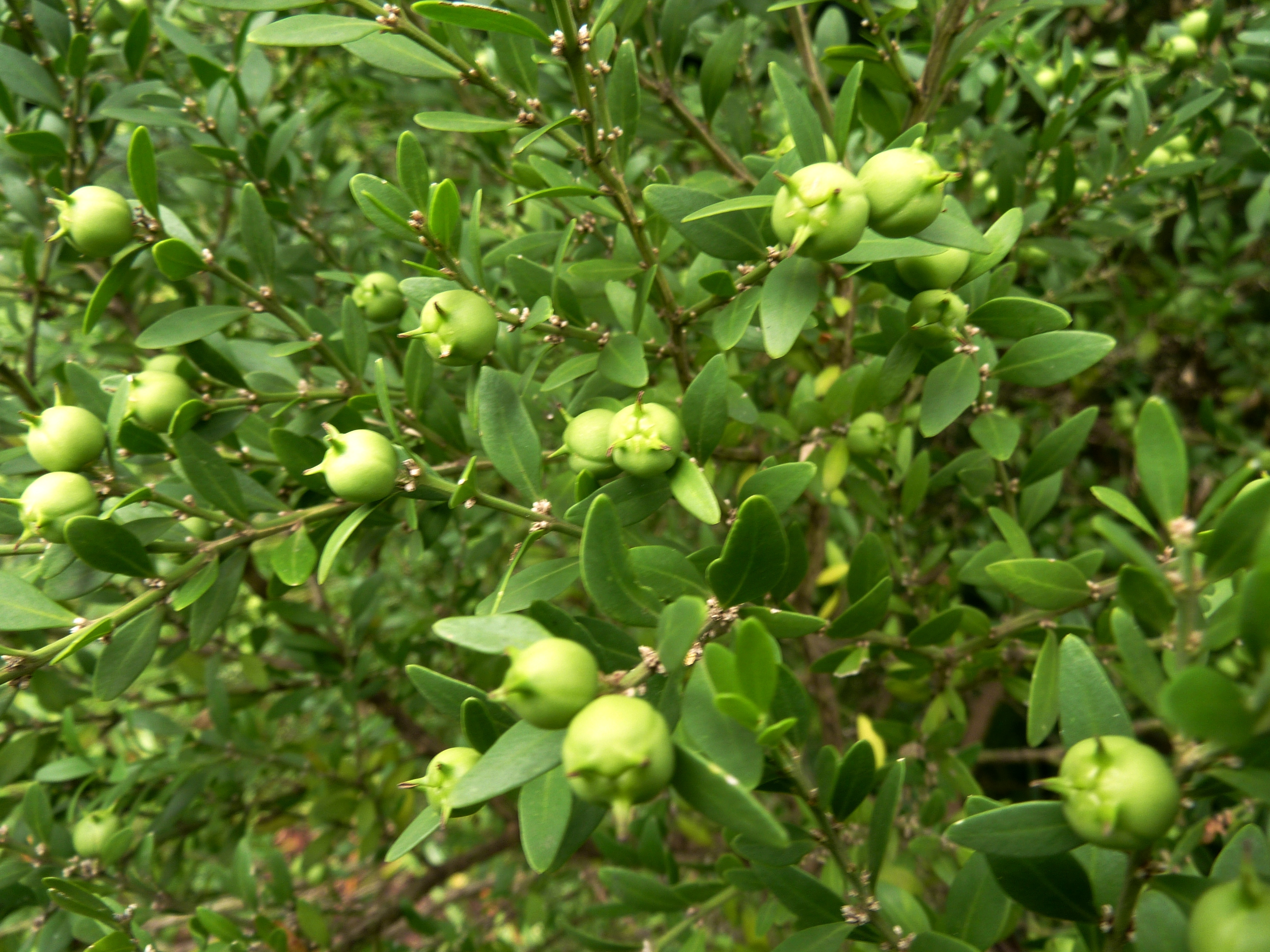
Trilete fruits crowned by persistent styles

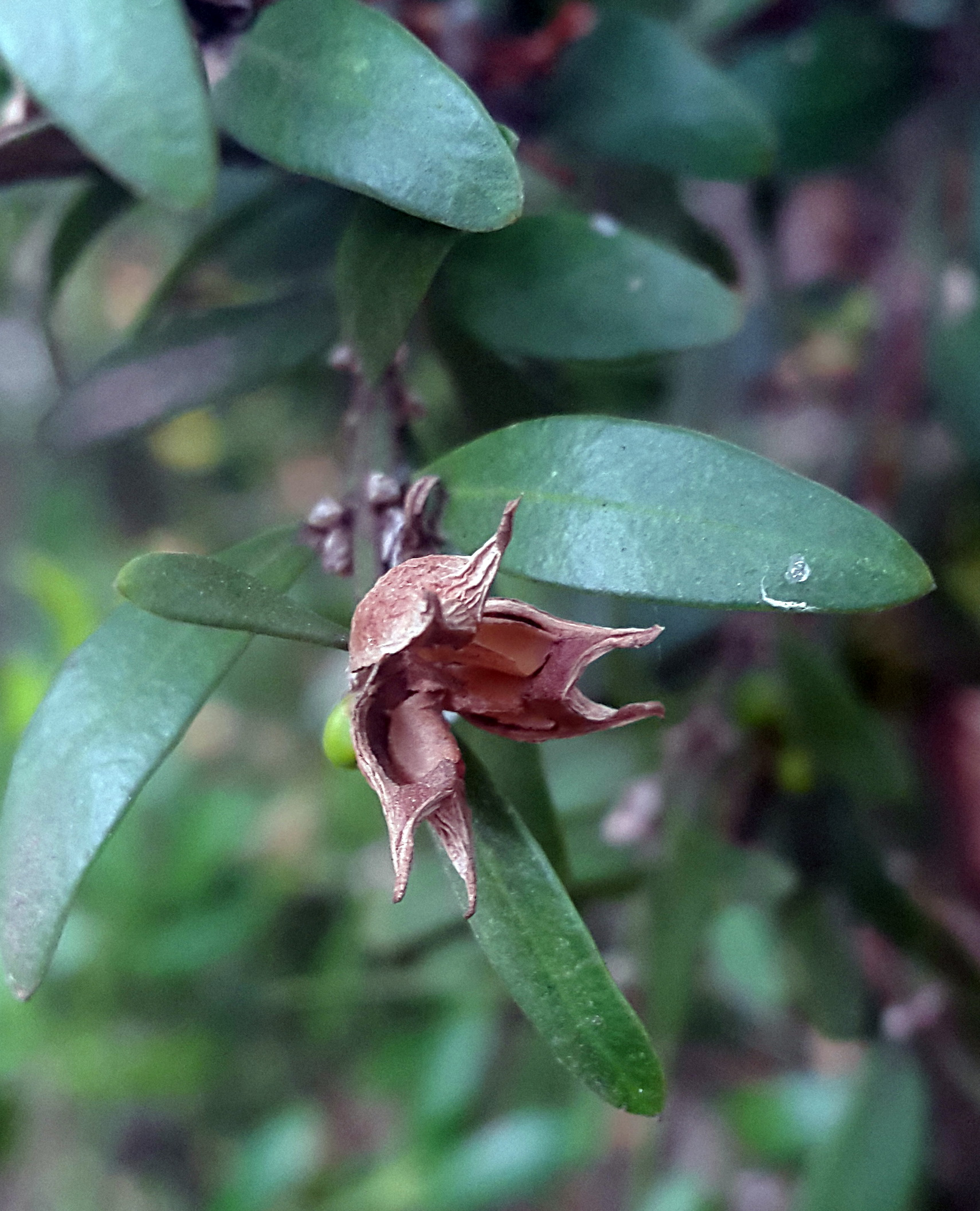
Dehisced fruit showing persistent styles
