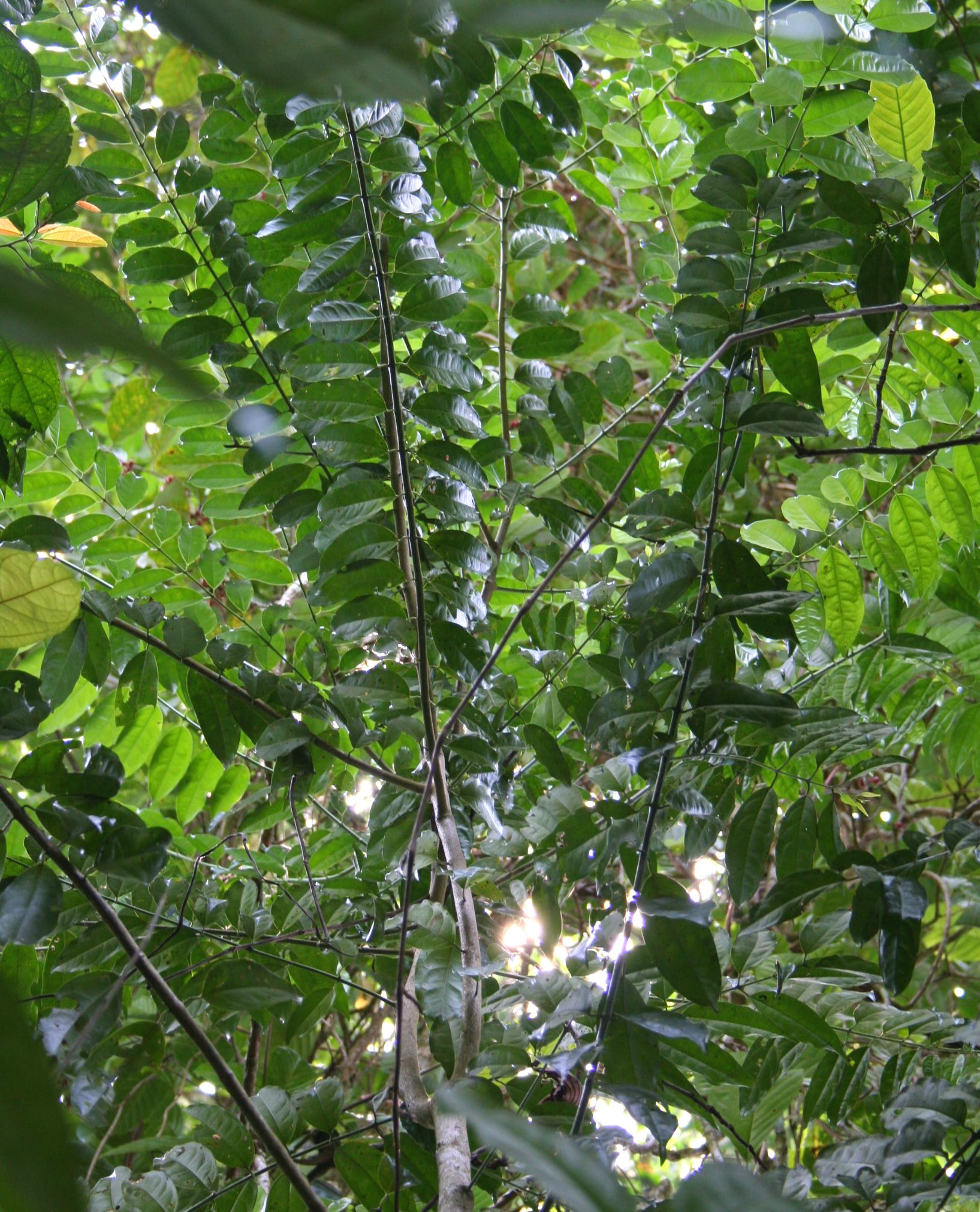
- Tree from re-discovery in 2010

Scientific classification
- Kingdom: Plantae
- Clade: Tracheophytes
- Clade: Angiosperms
- Clade: Eudicots
- Order: Buxales
- Family: Buxaceae
- Genus: Haptanthus; Goldberg & C.Nelson
- Species: H. hazlettii

Binomial name
- Haptanthus hazlettii Goldberg & C.Nelson

= Haptanthus =

Genus of shrub

Haptanthus is a monotypic genus containing the sole species Haptanthus hazlettii, a shrub or small tree known only from the locality of Matarras in the Arizona Municipality in Honduras. Its flowers are unique among the flowering plants. A single "female" (carpellate) flower has two branches on either side which carry "male" (staminate) flowers. The flowers are very simple, lacking obvious sepals or petals. The family placement of the genus has been uncertain but based on molecular phylogenetic research, it is included in the family Buxaceae as of September 2014. Very few individuals have ever been found, and its habitat is threatened by logging.

== Description ==
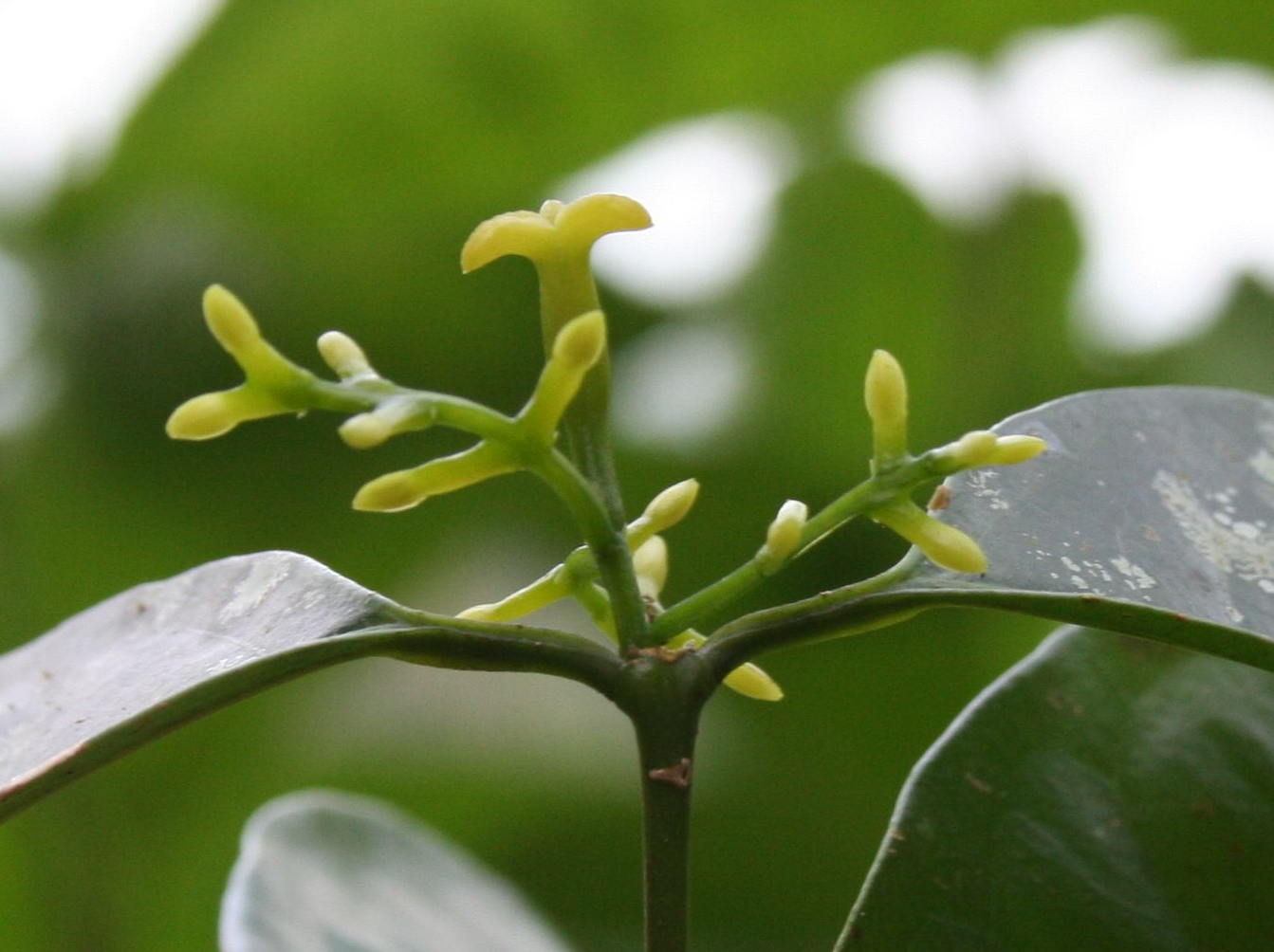
Inflorescence showing central carpellate flower and lateral staminate flowers

Haptanthus hazlettii is a shrub or tree. It has opposite leaves spaced at 5.5–6.0 cm (2.2–2.4 in) apart, usually arranged in two ranks (distichous). The leaves are simple with untoothed (entire) margins. There are no stipules. The leaf stalk (petiole) is short, 7–8 mm (0.28–0.31 in) long, the leaf blade (lamina) 10–13.5 cm (3.9–5.3 in) long by 4.1–5.6 cm (1.6–2.2 in) wide. The entire plant is hairless (glabrous).

The flowers are unisexual, carried on the same inflorescence (i.e. the plant is monoecious). One (or occasionally two) inflorescences emerge from a leaf axil, with at least five inflorescence-bearing axils per fertile branch. The inflorescences have a unique structure among flowering plants. In the centre there is a single carpellate ("female") flower. This lacks obvious petals or sepals (although there are small bracts below the flower which some researchers have suggested may be the remnants of the perianth), and consists solely of a single-celled (unilocular) ovary, 5 mm (0.20 in) long by 2 mm (0.08 in) wide, surmounted by three curved 4 mm (0.16 in) long stigmas. On either side of the solitary carpellate flower there are two branches each with five or six staminate ("male") flowers arranged at 1–3 mm (0.04–0.12 in) intervals.

The structure of the staminate flowers has been interpreted differently. The original describers of the species, Aaron Goldberg and Cirilo Nelson, considered that each staminate flower was basically just a single stamen, with a flattened filament about 3–5 mm (0.12–0.20 in) long grading into an anther about 2.5 mm (0.10 in) long. Two staminate flowers from the original specimen were re-examined by Andrew Doust and Peter Stevens. They concluded that each staminate flower definitely had two anthers, closely pressed together. They were unable to make a firm choice between two interpretations. The first is that the staminate flowers are basically as described by Goldberg and Nelson, except there are two stamens with fused or closely pressed filaments and anthers rather than one. The second, which they preferred, is that Goldberg and Nelson's "filament" is actually a pedicel (i.e. a stem on which the parts of the flower are carried) and that their "anther" consists of two closely pressed structures each made up of a tepal with a fused anther inside it. Either way, the flowers of Haptanthus hazlettii have "a morphology unlike that of any other angiosperm".

== Taxonomy ==
The sole species was first discovered in 1980 when a single specimen was collected by Donald L. Hazlett. It was described scientifically in 1989 by Goldberg and Nelson, as a new genus and species, Haptanthus hazlettii. Initially Goldberg and Nelson were unable to assign Haptanthus to a family. Nelson later placed it in its own family, Haptanthaceae. In 2005, an attempt was made to obtain DNA for sequencing from the only known specimen, but this failed. Based on an analysis of the morphology of the specimen, Doust and Stevens suggested that Haptanthus was possibly related to the Buxales. The APG III system of 2009 accepted the family Haptanthaceae, placing it in the order Buxales, along with the Buxaceae. The close relationship with the Buxaceae was confirmed in 2011 when DNA was successfully obtained from a newly collected specimen. Molecular phylogenetic analysis showed that Haptanthus belongs inside the family Buxaceae rather than in a family of its own. The APG IV system of 2016 includes Haptanthus in the family Buxaceae.

== Distribution, habitat and conservation ==
Haptanthus hazlettii has only been found in a very small area of tropical rain forest on the northern coast of Honduras, close to Matarras in the Arizona Municipality. After the original specimen was collected in 1989, numerous attempts were made to find the species again but without success; the area had become covered with grass following tree clearance. It was thought that the species was perhaps extinct. In 2010 an expedition organized by Alexey B. Shipunov and Ekaterina Shipunova found a single tree 2 km (1.2 mi) from the original collection point. A few more were later found nearby. Work to conserve the species is being led by the Lancetilla Botanical Garden of Tela, Honduras.
