= Cirilo Nelson =

Honduran botanist (1938–2020)

Cirilo Nelson (30 July 1938 – 26 December 2020) was a Honduran botanist and researcher at the Department of Biology of the Universidad Nacional Autónoma de Honduras. In 1965, he earned his master's degree at the University of Colorado Boulder. In the mid 1980s, he collected plants with the likes of David Ruiz and Sandra Gomez in the Swan Islands. He is particularly renowned for his catalogue of Honduran plants, around 10,127 described species, believed to be representative of about 60 percent of what exists.
