= Arizona, Atlántida =

Arizona
- Municipality
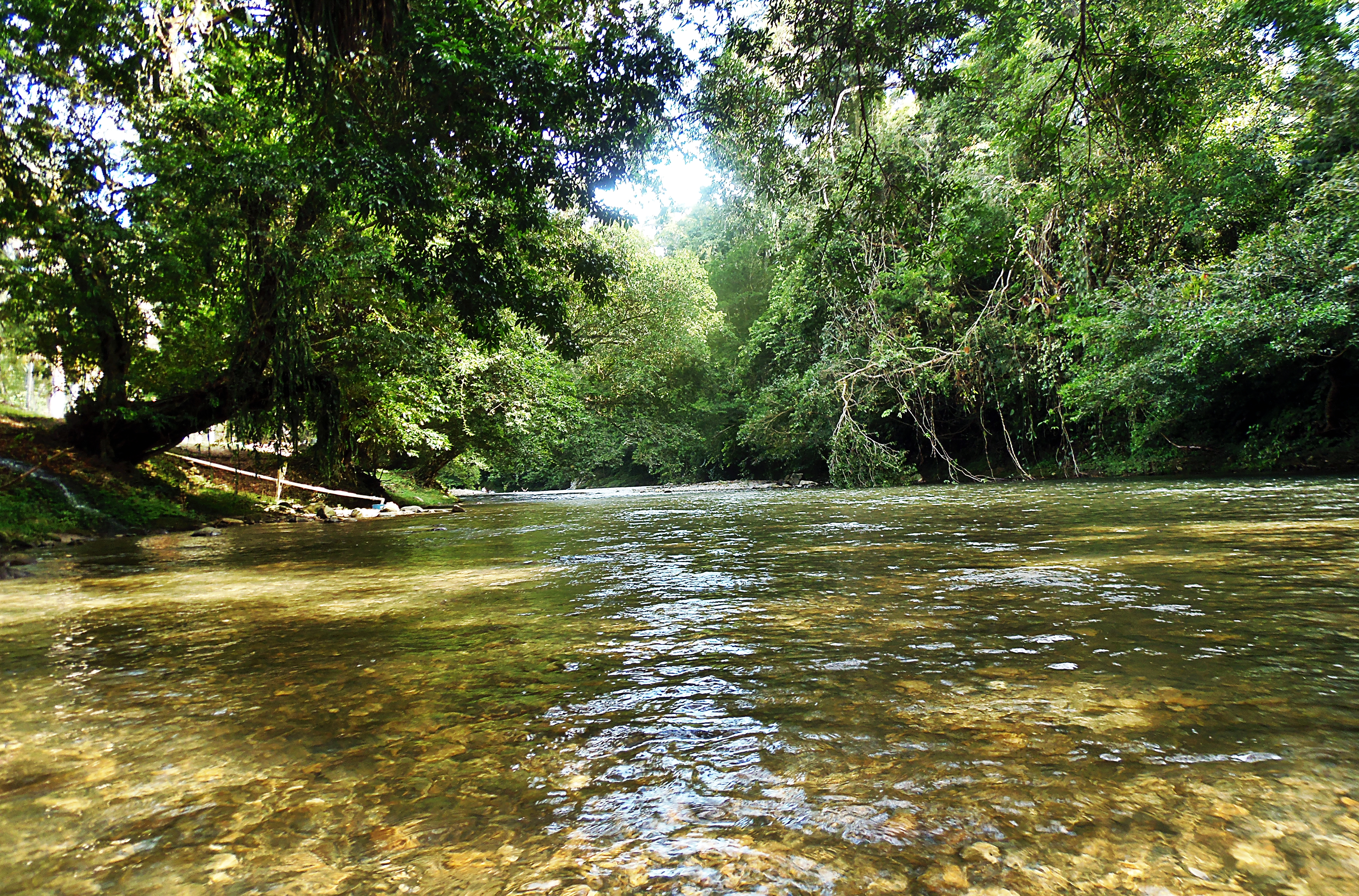

- Location in Honduras
- Coordinates: 15°41′N 87°20′W
- Country: Honduras
- Department: Atlántida
- Foundation: 24 January 1990; 36 years ago

Government
  - Mayor: Carlos Arnaldo Chacón Mencía (PL)

Area
  - Municipality: 531 km^{2} (205 sq mi)

Population (2020 projection)
  - Municipality: 25,320
  - Density: 47.7/km^{2} (123/sq mi)
  - Urban: 12,558
- Time zone: UTC−06:00 (CST)
- Postal code: 31801
- Administrative code: 0108
- Climate: Af

Arizona (Spanish pronunciation: [aɾiˈsona]) is a town, with a population of 5,779 (2013 census), and a municipality in the Honduran department of Atlántida.

The villages of Cangelica, Chiquito, El Cedro, El Coco, El Retiro, Hicaque, Jilamo, Las Palmas, Los Bolos, Matarras, Mezapa, Mojiman, Oropendolas, Planes de Hicaque, Quebradas de Arena, Santa Maria, Uluasito and Zapote are located in Arizona.

== History ==
On 29 October 2022, the municipality decided in an open council against the construction of a hydroelectric power plant, as well as against concessions for model cities and mining projects in the region.
