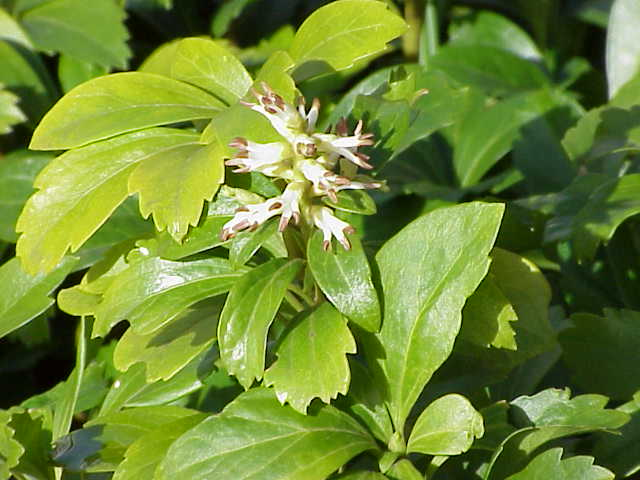
- Pachysandra terminalis

Scientific classification
- Kingdom: Plantae
- Clade: Embryophytes
- Clade: Tracheophytes
- Clade: Spermatophytes
- Clade: Angiosperms
- Clade: Eudicots
- Order: Buxales
- Family: Buxaceae
- Genus: Pachysandra; Michx.

Species
- See text

= Pachysandra =

Genus of flowering plants

Pachysandra /ˌpækiˈsændrə/ is a genus of five species of evergreen perennials or subshrubs, belonging to the boxwood family Buxaceae. The species are native to eastern Asia and southeast North America, some reaching a height of 20–45 cm (7.9–17.7 in), with only weakly woody stems. The leaves are alternate, leathery, with a coarsely toothed margin, and are typically 5–10 cm (2.0–3.9 in) long. The small uni-sexual blooms are greenish-white and produced in late spring or early summer.

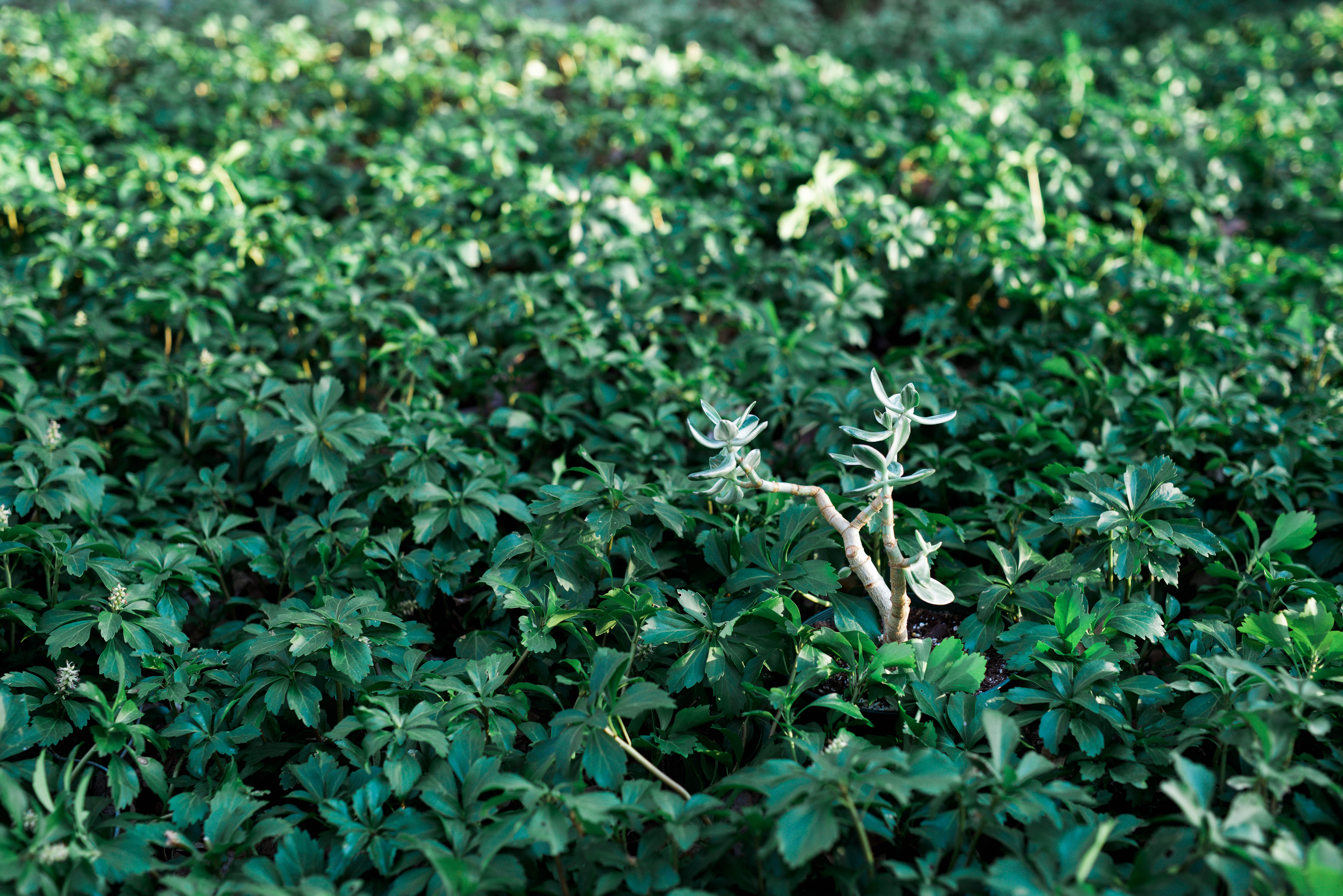
Variegated Jade among Pachysandra. Pachysandra is often used as a ground cover.

== Etymology ==
Pachysandra is derived from the Ancient Greek words παχύς (pachýs, 'thick') and ἀνήρ, genitive ἀνδρός (anḗr, genitive andrós, "man"), and is a reference to the thick stamens.

== Species ==
- Pachysandra axillaris - China
- Pachysandra coriacea (sometimes classified as Sarcococca coriacea) - India, Nepal, Myanmar
- Pachysandra procumbens - Allegheny Pachysandra (southeast United States)
- Pachysandra stylosa - China (sometimes treated as a variety of P. axillaris)
- Pachysandra terminalis - China, Japan

== Cultivation and uses ==
Pachysandra can grow in deep-shade areas and is thus well-suited and popular as ground cover for shade gardens. There are several varieties used in the garden landscape, all of which are deer-resistant:

- The most commonly used species is P. terminalis, or Japanese spurge, which is an aggressively spreading evergreen ground cover.
- 'Variegata' has leaves attractively variegated green and creamy white, with a slower growth/spreading rate as P. terminalis.
- 'Green Sheen' Pachysandra has extra glossy dark green leaves and slowly spreads.
- 'Green Carpet' Pachysandra has deeper semi glossed green leaves than the common P. Terminalis, with prominent veining, more toothed serrations to the leaf edge, and a shorter more compact growth habit.

All species in this genus prefer a well-drained soil with a high humus content.
