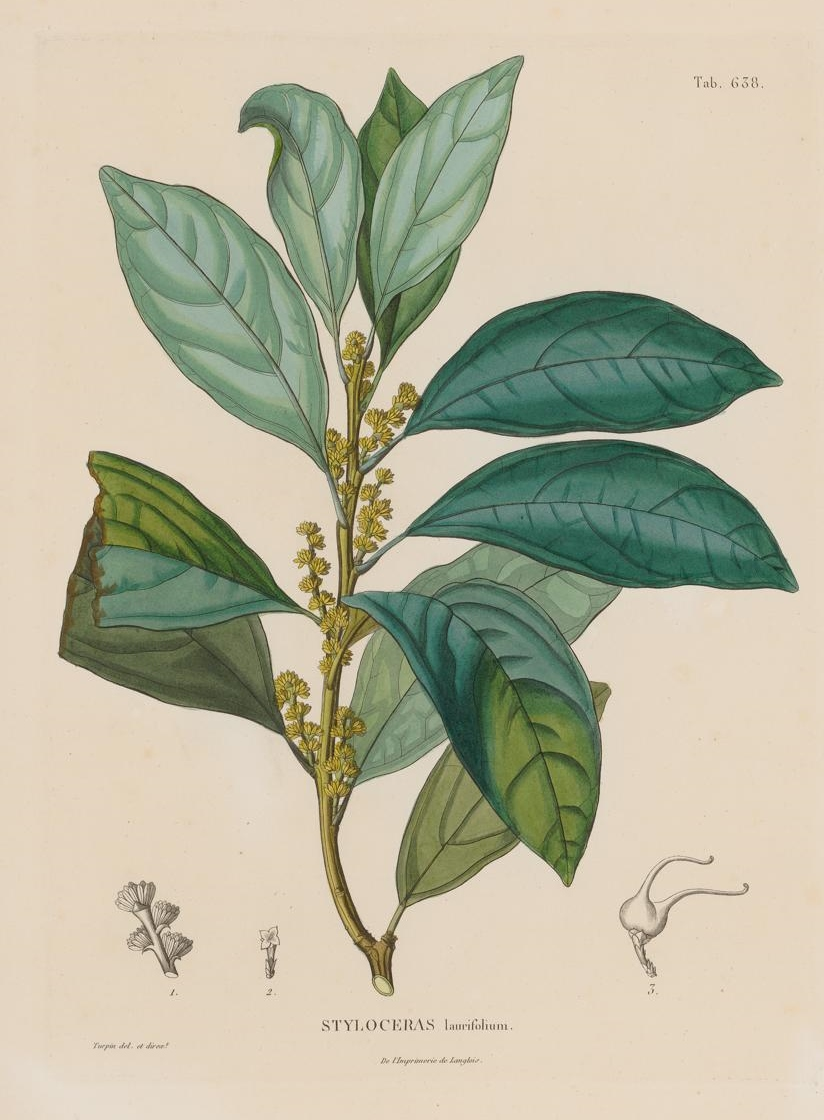
- Styloceras laurifolium

Scientific classification
- Kingdom: Plantae
- Clade: Tracheophytes
- Clade: Angiosperms
- Clade: Eudicots
- Order: Buxales
- Family: Buxaceae
- Genus: Styloceras; Kunth ex A.Juss.

= Styloceras =

Family of shrubs and trees

Styloceras is a genus of shrubs and trees in the family Buxaceae. It is native to South America.

== Taxonomy ==
The following species are currently recognized:

- Styloceras brokawii A.H.Gentry & R.B.Foster
- Styloceras columnare Müll.Arg.
- Styloceras connatum Torrez & P.Jørg.
- Styloceras kunthianum A.Juss.
- Styloceras laurifolium (Willd.) Kunth
- Styloceras penninervium A.H.Gentry & G.A.Aymard
