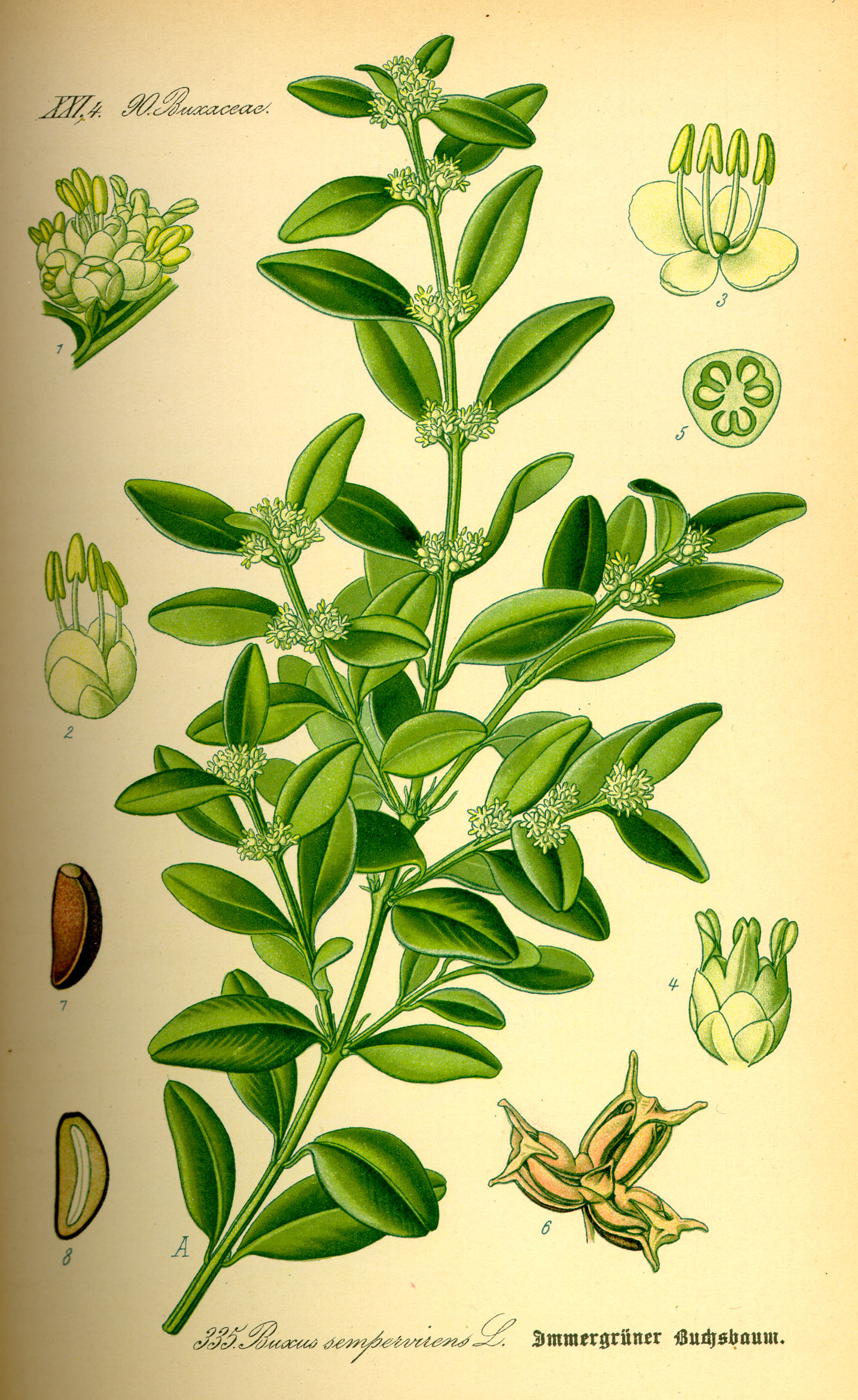
- Buxus sempervirens

Scientific classification
- Kingdom: Plantae
- Clade: Embryophytes
- Clade: Tracheophytes
- Clade: Angiosperms
- Clade: Eudicots
- Order: Buxales; Takht. ex Reveal

Families
- Buxaceae Dumort., nom. cons.; Didymelaceae Leandri (may be included in Buxaceae; see text); Haptanthaceae C.Nelson (may be included in Buxaceae; see text)

= Buxales =

Order of eudicot flowering plants

The Buxales are a small order of eudicot flowering plants, recognized by the APG IV system of 2016. The order includes the family Buxaceae; the families Didymelaceae and Haptanthaceae may also be recognized or may be included in the Buxaceae. Many members of the order are evergreen shrubs or trees, although some are herbaceous perennials. They have separate "male" (staminate) and "female" (carpellate) flowers, mostly on the same plant (i.e. they are mostly monoecious). Some species are of economic importance either for the wood they produce or as ornamental plants.

== Description ==
The Buxales have relatively few obvious shared features distinguishing them from related groups of plants (i.e. few obvious synapomorphies). One is the presence of a particular type of alkaloid or pseudoalkaloid, pregnane steroids. They have unisexual flowers (i.e. separate staminate or "male" flowers and carpellate or "female" flowers), most being monoecious. The flowers are small, less than 7 mm across. The tepals have a single vascular bundle (trace). Other characters common to the order include leaves with entire (untoothed) margins, flowers arranged in racemes, small styles capable of receiving pollen along their entire length rather than having a separate stigma, one to two ovules per carpel, and seeds with testae (coats) made up of several cell layers.

Didymeles, the sole genus in the family Didymelaceae, consists of two species of evergreen tree occurring only in Madagascar. It is dioecious, i.e. with staminate and carpellate flowers on separate plants. Buxaceae (including Haptanthaceae) is more diverse, with five or six genera totalling about 115 species, and is found in most temperate and tropical areas of the world. Most species are evergreen shrubs or small trees, but some (such as those of Pachysandra) are herbaceous perennials.

== Taxonomy ==
In the APG III system of 2009, the order includes two families, Buxaceae and Haptanthaceae. Unlike previous classifications (including the APG II system of 2003), APG III does not recognize the family Didymelaceae, but includes the genus Didymeles in Buxaceae. Subsequent research published in 2011 suggests that the Haptanthaceae are embedded in the Buxaceae, possibly as the sister to Buxus, and as of September 2014 the Angiosperm Phylogeny Website no longer recognizes Haptanthaceae. In the 2016 APG IV system, Haptanthaceae is incorporated into Buxaceae, which leaves Buxaceae the only family under Buxales.

=== Phylogeny ===
The Buxales are placed within the eudicots but outside the core eudicots, in a paraphyletic group of basal eudicots. The monophyly of the order and its general position relative to other eudicots has been confirmed by many studies. One possible phylogenetic tree is shown below, where the precise ordering of the basal eudicots is still uncertain.

- eudicots
  - Ranunculales
  - - Proteales and Sabiales
    - - Trochodendrales
      - - Buxales
        - core eudicots

One difference between the basal eudicots and the core eudicots is that the latter appear to have undergone a complete triplication of the nuclear genome which is absent in the former. Molecular phylogenetic studies have produced slightly different internal arrangements of the families and genera within the order; hence the variation in the number of families into which it is divided.

=== Genera ===
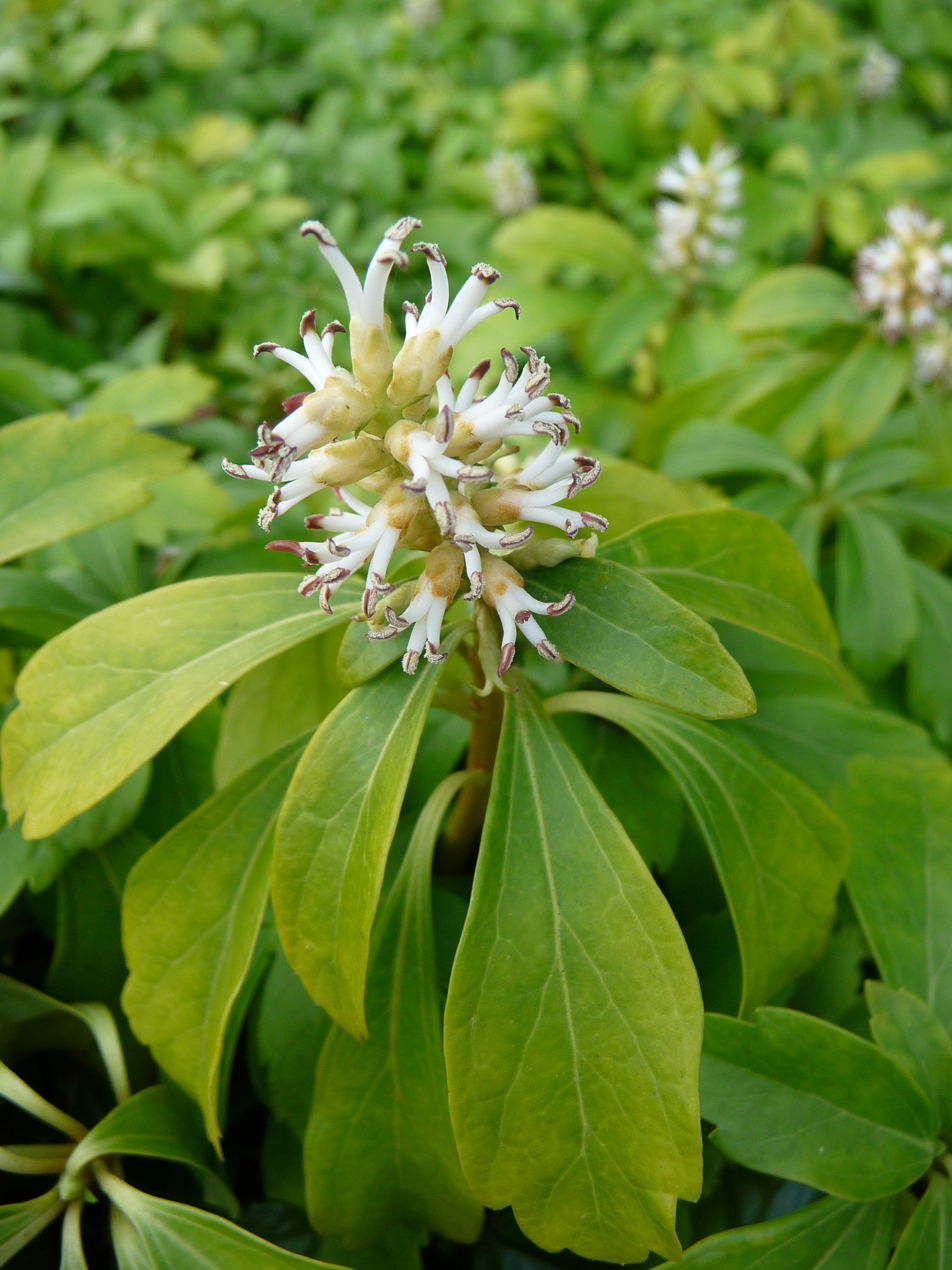
Pachysandra terminalis

Didymelaceae or Buxaceae

- Didymeles Thouars

Buxaceae

- Buxus L. (including Notobuxus Oliver)
- Pachysandra Michx.
- Sarcococca Lindl.
- Styloceras Kunth ex A.Juss.

Buxaceae or Haptanthaceae

- Haptanthus Goldberg & C.Nelson

=== Former treatment ===
In the Cronquist system of 1981, the Buxaceae were associated with the Euphorbiaceae s.l., and the Didymelaceae were given their own order. In the APG II system of 2003, the Buxaceae were a family unplaced as to order in the eudicots, optionally including the genus Didymeles, which could alternatively be placed in its own family.

=== Age ===
According to molecular clock calculations, the lineage that led to Buxales split from other plants about 129 million years ago or 120 million years ago.

== Uses ==
Some species of the Buxaceae are of economic importance. Buxus sempervirens (common box) and Buxus macowanii (Cape box) produce hard wood valued for carving and engraving. Species are also used as ornamental garden plants and for bonsai. Common box is used for hedging and border edging. Species of Pachysandra are used as ground cover. Species of Sarcococca produce small but strongly scented flowers in the winter.
