= List of Hungarian botanists =

The below list contains most important Hungarian botanists in alphabetical order, indicating their main biographical dates and fields of botany in which they have been researching.

== A ==
- Sámuel Ab Hortis (1729–1792) plant physiology
- Éva Ács (born 1964) phycology
- József Agnelli (1852–1923) agricultural botany, medical botany
- László Almádi (born 1936) herbology, plant systematics
- István Ambrózy (1869–1933) floristics, horticulture
- József Andrasovszky (1889–1943) ampelography
- Gábor Andreánszky (1895–1967) phytogeography, paleobotany
- Lambert Angeli (1916–1971) agricultural botany
- Dezső Angyal (1852–1936) pomology
- Dániel Antal (1901–1972) agricultural botany, pomology
- Béla Augustin (1877–1954) medical botany

== B ==
- Nándor Bacsó (1904–1974) plant ecology
- Leona Baksay (1915 – c. 2005) plant physiology, plant systematics
- Sándor Bálint (1860–1922) ampelography
- József Balogh (1750 – c. 1781) floristics
- Henrik Band (1840–1913) floristics, horticulture
- Zoltán Barabás (1926–1993) agricultural botany
- Aurél Baranyai (1903–1983) medical botany
- Zoltán Baráth (1924–1982) phytosociology, plant systematics, floristics
- Béla Barna (1931–1979) agricultural botany, pomology
- Beáta Mária Barnabás (born 1948) agricultural botany
- Károly Baross (1865–1905) ampelography
- László Baross (1865–1938) agricultural botany
- István Barra (1900–1986) ampelography, phytopathology
- István Barra (1805–1865) plant systematics
- József Barth (1833–1915) floristics
- Bertalan Baskay Tóth (1903–1976) agricultural botany
- Károly Bátky (1794–1859) agricultural botany
- János Keresztély Baumgarten (1756–1843) floristics
- Jenő Bayer (1932–1970) phytochemistry
- Zoltán Bedő (born 1951) agricultural botany
- László Beke (1881–1950) agricultural botany, phytopathology
- Miklós Békésy (1903–1980) agricultural botany, medical botany
- László Benedek (1901–1977) agricultural botany
- Dániel Benkő (1799–1883) agricultural botany
- Máté Bereczki (1824–1895) pomology
- Lajos Bontovics (1929–1987) agricultural botany
- József Benkő (1740–1814) floristics, medical botany
- Jenő Bernátsky (1873–1944) phytosociology, plant systematics, phytopathology, mycology
- Péter Betegh (1884–1969) medical botany
- István Beythe (1532–1612) floristics, mycology
- Gyula Bihari (1889–1977) herbology
- Gyula Bittera (1893–1970) agricultural botany, medical botany
- Miklós Bittera (1887–1947) agricultural botany
- Tibor Blattny (1883–1969) forestry
- Béla Bodnár (1932–1960) floristics, phytogeography
- János Bodnár (1889–1953) phytochemistry
- István Bodócs (1887–1965) plant morphology
- Pál Bodor (1773–1828) pomology
- György Bodrogközy (born 1924) phytosociology, plant ecology
- János Bolla (1806–1881) floristics, mycology
- Pál Bolza (1861–1947) horticulture
- Vinczé von Borbás (1844–1905) floristics, plant systematics, phytosociology
- Attila Borhidi (born 1932) plant systematics, floristics, phytosociology
- Ádám Boros (1900–1973) floristics, bryology, phycology
- Rezső Boros (1925–1968) pomology
- Olga Borsos (1926–2025) plant systematics, plant morphology
- György Böckh (1822–1874) phytogeography
- János Bruder (1913–1982) agricultural botany
- József Budai (1851–1939) pomology, floristics

== C ==
- Béla Jenő Cholnoky (1899–1972) phycology
- László Cholnoky (1899–1967) phytochemistry
- Kornél Chyzer (1836–1909) floristics
- Ottó Claader (1907–1985) phytochemistry
- József Csapó (1734–1799) medical botany
- József Csapó M. (1911–1979) agricultural botany
- István Csapody (1930–2002) forestry, floristics
- Vera Csapody (1890–1985) floristics, plant systematics, plant physiology
- Kálmán Csatári-Szüts (1912–1973) agricultural botany
- János Csató (1833–1913) floristics
- Adolf Cserey (1851–1918) plant systematics
- Farkas Cserey (1773–1842) floristics
- Sándor Cserháti (1852–1909) agricultural botany
- József Csókás (1824–1905) ampelography
- János Csolsch (fl. 18th–19th century) horticulture
- Szabó István Csonti (1895–1960) agricultural botany
- Zoltán Csorba (1904–1981) phytopathology, mycology
- István Csűrös (1914–1998) floristics, phytosociology
- Kálmán Czakó (1843–1895) agricultural botany
- Nándor Czeiner (1850–1928) ampelography
- Antal Czetz (1801–1865) floristics
- Gyula Czimber (born 1936) herbology

== D ==
- Ágnes Dániel (1929–1986) phytochemistry, plant physiology
- Lajos Dániel (1902–1978) pomology
- Ferenc Darvas (1883–1934) medical botany
- Zsolt Debreczy (born 1941) dendrology, bryology
- János Kristóf Deccard (1686–1764) floristics
- János Vilmos Deccard (1722–1778) floristics
- Árpád Degen (1866–1934) floristics, plant morphology, agricultural botany
- Imre Deininger (1844–1918) agricultural botany, paleoethnobotany
- Károly Demeter (1852–1890) bryology
- Dezső Dicenty (1879–1965) ampelography
- Sámuel Diószegi (1760–1813) plant systematics
- Géza Károly Doby (1877–1968) phytochemistry
- Gábor Doleschall (1813–1891) plant physiology
- János Domokos (1904–1978) horticulture
- József Dorner (1808–1873) plant morphology
- Lajos Dőry (1904–1977) agricultural botany

== E ==
- István László Endlicher (1804–1849) plant systematics
- Ferenc Entz (1805–1877) ampelography
- József Ercsei (1792–1868) floristics
- József Ernyey (1874–1945) history of botany

== F ==
- Sándor Fáber (1874–1933) agricultural botany
- János Fábry (1830–1907) floristics
- Géza Facsar (born 1941) plant systematics, paleoethnobotany, horticulture
- Béla Faludi (1909–1984) plant morphology
- Gábor Farkas (1925–1986) plant physiology, plant morphology, phytopathology
- Edit Éva Farkas (born 1959) lichenologist
- Loránd Farkas (1914–1986) phytochemistry
- Mihály Farkas (1833–1900) agricultural botany
- Mihály Fazekas (1766–1828) plant systematics
- Dániel Fehér (1890–1955) forestry, plant physiology
- Sándor Feichtinger (1817–1907) floristics
- Gábor Fekete (born 1930) floristics, phytogeography, phytosociology
- József Fekete (1842–1905) horticulture
- Lajos Fekete (1837–1916) forestry
- Zoltán Fekete (1877–1962) forestry, phytogeography
- Lajos Felföldy (born 1920) phycology
- Ferenc Fellner (1847–1913) horticulture
- Lajos Fialowski (1846–1909) history of botany
- Nándor Filarszky (1858–1941) phycology, plant morphology, plant systematics
- Károly Flatt (1853–1906) agricultural botany, history of botany
- Rudolf Fleischmann (1879–1950) agricultural botany
- Ferenc Fóriss (1892–1977) floristics, lichenology
- János Földi (1755–1801) plant systematics
- Rezső Francé (1874–1943) phytopathology, phycology
- Alfonz Sándor Freh (1832–1915) floristics
- Vilmos Frenyó (1908–1998) plant physiology
- János Fridvaldszky (1730–1784) dendrology
- Loránd Fridvaldszky (1923–1994) plant morphology
- Imre Frivaldszky (1799–1870) floristics
- Mihály Fucskó (1885–1914) plant morphology, plant physiology
- Mihály Fuss (1814–1883) floristics

== G ==
- Miklós Galántai (1937–2005) horticulture
- László Gallé (1908–1980) phytopathology, lichenology
- Gyula Gáyer (1883–1932) plant systematics, phytogeography, floristics
- Samuel Genersich (1768–1844) floristics
- János Ádám Gensel (1677–1720) floristics
- István GergelyGunnar Larsson (swimmer) (1877–1960) pomology
- Guido Gerhárdt (1876–1939) agricultural botany
- Rezső Geschwind (1829–1910) horticulture
- György Lajos Gillemot (1813–1892) horticulture
- Nándor Gimesi (1892–1953) plant physiology, plant morphology, phycology
- Rudolf Giovannini (1891–1963) medical botany
- Károly Gomba (1889–1916) plant morphology
- Endre Gombocz (1882–1945) floristics, plant systematics, history of botany
- István Gondola (1922–1970) agricultural botany, herbology
- Jenő Görög (1920–1978) phytopathology, mycology
- Emil Grabner (1878–1955) agricultural botany, medical botany
- Pál Greguss (1889–1984) plant physiology, plant morphology
- Ferenc Greinich (1867–1942) floristics
- Irma Greisiger (1882–1947) bryology floristics
- György Griger (1879–1946) horticulture
- Béla Gróf (1883–1936) agricultural botany, phytopathology
- Ferenc Gruber (1905–1971) agricultural botany
- Ignác Grundl (1813–1878) floristics
- Antal Gulyás (1884–1980) phytopathology
- József Gulyás (1917–1979) phytochemistry
- József Gyárfás (1875–1965) agricultural botany
- Barna Győrffy (1911–1970) plant physiology
- István Győrffy (1880–1959) bryology
- József György (1813–1862) floristics
- Antal Gyürki (1817–1890) ampelography

== H ==
- Károly Haberle (1764–1832) plant systematics
- Lilla Hably (born 1953) paleobotany
- Márta Halász (1905–1971) phycology
- János Halmai (1903–1973) medical botany
- Lajos Haracsi (1898–1978) erdészeti phytopathology
- Árpád Haraszty (1907–1987) plant morphology, plant physiology
- Zoltán Hargitai (1912–1945) floristics, phytosociology
- Lajos Haynald (1816–1891) floristics
- András Háznagy (1913–1987) medical botany
- Bertalan Hazslinszky (1902–1966) plant morphology, veterinary botany
- Frigyes Ákos Hazslinszky (1818–1896) floristics, mycology, lichenology, bryology, phycology
- Dezső Hegyi (1873–1926) phytopathology, mycology
- Árpád Hensch (1847–1913) agricultural botany
- Márton Herczeg (1936–1987) agricultural botany
- László Heszky (born 1945) agricultural botany
- János Heuffel (1800–1857) floristics
- Ede Heykal (1844–1929) horticulture, pomology
- Ferenc Hollendonner (1882–1935) plant morphology, paleoethnobotany
- László Hollós (1859–1940) mycology, floristics
- András Horánszky (born 1928) floristics, plant systematics, dendrology
- János Horn (1881–1958) pomology
- Miklós Horn (1899–1965) agricultural botany
- Tibor Hortobágyi (1912–1990) phycology, plant systematics, agricultural botany
- Adolf Olivér Horvát (1907–2006) floristics, phytosociology
- Ernő Horváth (1929–1990) floristics
- Imre Horváth (1926–1979) plant ecology, forestry
- József Horváth (born 1936) agricultural botany, phytopathology
- János Hulják (1883–1942) floristics
- Béla Husz (1892–1954) phytopathology, mycology

== I ==
- József Igmándy (1897–1950) floristics, bryology
- Zoltán Igmándy (1925–2000) forestry, mycology
- Károly Irk (1882–1924) medical botany
- István Isépy (born 1942) medical botany
- Gyula Istvánffi (1860–1930) plant morphology, phycology, mycology, ampelography

== J ==
- Jenő Jablonszky (1892–1975) plant systematics, paleobotany
- Miklós József Jacquin (1727–1817) floristics
- István Jakobey (1901–1971) agricultural botany
- Pál Jakucs (1928–2000) phytosociology, plant ecology
- Béla Jámbor (1917–1971) plant physiology, plant morphology
- Viktor Janka (1837–1890) floristics, plant systematics
- Andor Jánossy (1908–1975) agricultural botany
- Sándor Jávorka (1883–1961) floristics, plant systematics
- József Jeanplong (born 1919) floristics, phytogeography, phytosociology
- Endre Jeney (1891–1970) phytochemistry
- Miklós Juhász (born 1938) palynology
- Pál Juhász-Nagy (1935–1993) plant ecology
- Lajos Jurányi (1837–1897) plant morphology, plant physiology

== K ==
- János Kabay (1896–1936) medical botany
- Ágoston Kanitz (1843–1896) floristics, history of botany
- Károly Kaplonyi (1918–1971) agricultural botany, plant physiology
- Bertalan Karmacsi (1898–1977) pomology
- Rezső Károly (1868–1945) agricultural botany
- Árpád Károlyi (1907–1972) floristics, bryology
- István Kárpáti (1924–1989) phycology
- Zoltán Kárpáti (1909–1972) floristics, phytogeography, plant systematics, dendrology
- Mihály Dénes Katona (1782–1874) agricultural botany
- Zsigmond Katona (1828–1902) pomology, ampelography
- Gusztáv Adolf Kayser (1817–1878) floristics
- Miklós Kedves (1933–2003) palynology
- Jenő Keller (1917 – c. 1945) plant systematics
- Kálmán Kenessey (1822–1913) agricultural botany
- József Kerekes (1924–1973) agricultural botany, medical botany
- Elek Kerényi (1916–1963) horticulture
- Herman Kern (1876–1957) phytopathology, mycology
- Kálmán Kerpely (1864–1940) agricultural botany
- Pál Kitaibel (1757–1817) floristics
- Gyula Klein (1844–1915) phycology, mycology, plant morphology
- Antal Kodolányi (1835–1910) agricultural botany, plant morphology
- Erzsébet Kol (1897–1980) phycology
- Károly Kolbai (1901–1972) agricultural botany
- Pál Kolbány (1758–1816) phytochemistry
- Kálmán Kolecsányi (1886–1960) horticulture
- Magda Komlódi (born 1931) floristics, palynology
- István Koren (1805–1893) floristics
- Gyula Korponay (1888–1975) pomology, gyümölcskórtan
- Tamás Kosutány (1848–1915) agricultural botany, plant physiology
- Ervin Iván Kovács (1934–1987) plant morphology
- János Kovács (1816–1906) floristics
- Margit Kovács (1930–1977) floristics, phytosociology
- Ferenc Kovács Huszka (1869–1944) floristics
- Ferenc Kováts (1873–1956) plant systematics
- Gyula Kováts (1815–1873) paleobotany, floristics
- Károly Kovatsits (1876–1929) agricultural botany
- Dénes Kozma (1875–1925) herbology
- Vilmos Kőfaragó-Gyelnik (1906–1945) lichenology
- Tamás Kőmíves (born 1944) agricultural botany
- Ferenc Kövessi (1875–1945) plant physiology, ampelography
- János György Kramer (1684–1744) plant systematics, medical botany
- András Kubacska (1871–1942) plant morphology, kertészeti növénytan
- Ágoston Kubinyi (1799–1873) floristics
- Samu Kupcsok (1850–1914) floristics
- Jenő Béla Kümmerle (1876–1931) plant morphology, pteridológia
- István Kwaysser (1915–1982) ampeleológus

== L ==
- Adolf Ferenc Láng (1795–1863) floristics
- Géza Láng (1916–1980) agricultural botany
- Samuel Lasz (1859–1930) climatology, zoology, and geology
- Gábor László (1878–1960) ősnövénytan, phytosociology
- Ödön Legány (1876–1944) agricultural botany
- Ferenc Legányi (1884–1964) paleobotany
- Ödön Lehner (1887–1938) pomology
- János Leibitzer (1763–1817) pomology
- Géza Lengyel (1884–1965) agricultural botany, floristics
- Lajos Letenyei (1822–1868) agricultural botany
- Viktor Ligeti (1912–1986) phytochemistry
- Károly Limbacher (1868–1937) pomology
- György Linhart (1844–1925) agricultural botany, phytopathology
- János Lippai (1606–1666) pomology
- Károly Frigyes Loew (1699–1741) floristics
- Hugó Lojka (1844–1887) floristics, lichenology
- István Lumnitzer (1747–1806) floristics

== M ==
- Sándor Mágócsy-Dietz (1855–1945) plant physiology, dendrology, mycology
- Gyula Magyar (1884–1945) agricultural botany, pomology, horticulture
- Pál Magyar (1895–1969) forestry, plant systematics, phytosociology
- Gyula Magyary-Kossa (1865–1944) medical botany
- Antal Majer (1910–1996) forestry
- Móric Májer (1815–1904) floristics
- György Mándy (1913–1976) agricultural botany, plant morphology
- István Manninger (1920–1990) agricultural botany, phytopathology
- Ferenc Marc (1813–1900) kertészeti növénytan
- Antal Margittai (1880–1939) floristics
- Sándor Márkus (1831–1867) phycology, floristics
- László Martos (1930–1957) plant physiology
- Imre Máthé, sr. (1911–1993) floristics, plant ecology, agricultural botany, phytochemistry, medical botany
- Imre Máthé, jr. (born 1942) phytochemistry, plant ecology
- Tamás Mauksch (1749–1832) floristics, mycology
- Gyula Méhes (1897–1970) medical botany
- Juhász Péter Méliusz (1532–1572) floristics
- László Menyhárth (1849–1897) floristics
- Ákos Mesterházy (born 1945) agricultural botany, phytopathology
- Lajos Mészáros (1913–1969) agricultural botany, plant morphology
- Gyula Mészöly (1910–1974) agricultural botany
- Gyula Mezey (1861–1922) phytopathology
- István Milkovits (born 1937) plant systematics
- László Miltényi (1901–1936) agricultural botany, plant morphology
- József Misák (1866–1939) horticulture
- Vidor Modor (1910–1979) medical botany, plant morphology
- Gusztáv Moesz (1873–1946) mycology, phytopathology, floristics, phytogeography
- Sámuel Mokry (1832–1909) agricultural botany
- Ádám Molnár (1713–1780) floristics
- Dezső Morbitzer (1879–1945) kertészeti növénytan
- Vilmos Mühle (1845–1908) kertészeti növénytan
- Ferenc Mygind (1710–1789) floristics

== N ==
- István Nagy (1905–1974) floristics
- Zoltán Nagy (1921–1987) agricultural botany
- Miksa Natter-Nád (1893–1982) plant systematics
- Márton Németh (1910–1986) ampelography
- Ernő Nemky (1909–1986) forestry, plant ecology
- Károly Nendtvich (1811–1892) floristics
- Tamás Nendtvich (1782–1858) floristics
- Antal Nowotarski (1825–1901) agricultural botany
- Antal Nyárády (1920–1982) floristics, phytosociology
- Erazmus Gyula Nyárády (1881–1966) floristics, plant systematics

== O ==
- Ernő Obermayer (1888–1969) agricultural botany, plant physiology
- Iván Okályi (1900–1968) pomology
- Miklós Olgyay (1904–1958) phytopathology
- Sándor Orbán (born 1947) bryology
- Miklós Ormándy (1846–1911) plant morphology
- Ottó Orsós (1911–1939) plant morphology

== P ==
- Árpád Paál (1889–1943) plant physiology
- Piroska Palik (1895–1966) phycology
- Gyula Pálinkás (1883–1957) ampelography
- József Pantocsek (1846–1916) phycology, floristics
- György Pántos (1924–1986) forestry, plant ecology
- József Papp (1900–1985) agricultural botany, dendrology
- Béla Páter (1860–1938) agricultural botany, medical botany
- Ármin Pecz (1820–1896) horticulture
- Antal Pénzes (1895–1984) pomology, floristics
- József Péterffy (1827–1888) agricultural botany
- István Péterfi (1906–1978) plant morphology, plant physiology, phycology
- Márton Péterfi (1875–1922) bryology
- Ferenc Petrányi (1890–1935) horticulture
- Sándor Pettenkoffer (1868–1946) ampelography
- Benő Pillitz (1825–1910) floristics
- Tamás Pócs (born 1933) floristics, bryology, phytosociology
- János Podhradszky (1914–1968) phytopathology
- György Pogácsás (1919–1977) agricultural botany, plant physiology, phytopathology
- Sándor Polgár (1876–1944) floristics, phytogeography
- Béla Pozsár (1922–1981) agricultural botany, plant physiology, phytochemistry
- István Précsényi (1926–2007) phytosociology, plant ecology
- Szaniszló Priszter (1917–2011) floristics, plant systematics, history of botany
- György Purkircher (1530–1577) medical botany

== Q ==
- József Quint (1882–1929) phycology, plant physiology

== R ==
- Ferenc Raffensberger (1851–1936) horticulture
- Miklós Rajczy (?) bryology
- László Rakcsányi (1901–1967) ampelography
- Rajmund Rapaics (1885–1954) phytogeography, plant systematics, phytosociology
- Klára M. Rásky (1908–1971) paleobotany
- Károly Rayger (1641–1707) medical botany
- Rezső Rédl (1895–1942) floristics, phytogeography
- Dezső Révy (1900–1954) phytopathology
- Aladár Richter (1868–1927) plant morphology
- Gusztáv Ritter (1846–1926) pomology
- Zoltán Roboz (1861–1905) ampelography
- Antal Rochel (1770–1847) floristics
- Pál Rom (1902–1962) medical botany
- István Rudinai Molnár (1850–1920) ampelography, pomology

== S ==
- István Saágy (1865–1945) horticulture
- József Sadler (1791–1849) floristics, plant systematics, pteridológia, mycology
- László Sántha (1886–1954) ampelography, phytopathology, lichenology
- Aladár Scherffel (1865–1939) phycology, mycology
- Vilmos Aurél Scherffel (1835–1895) floristics, mycology
- Károly Schilberszky (1863–1935) phytopathology, mycology
- Zsigmond Schiller (1847–1920) floristics
- József Schneider (1888–1963) horticulture
- Ferdinánd Schur (1799–1878) floristics
- János Schuster (1777–1839) plant systematics
- Tibor Simon (born 1926) floristics, plant systematics, phytosociology
- Lajos Simonkai (1851–1910) floristics, plant systematics, dendrology
- Károly Rezső Soó (1903–1980) floristics, phytogeography, phytosociology, plant systematics
- István Soós (1902–1959) ampelography
- Móric Staub (1842–1914) paleobotany, floristics
- János Suba (born 1929) floristics, plant physiology
- Zoltán Szabó (1882–1944) floristics, plant systematics, plant physiology
- Kálmán Szász (1910–1978) medical botany
- Ödön Szatala (1889–1958) lichenology
- Gusztáv Szelényi (1904–1982) phytopathology
- Gábor Szemes (1906–1993) phycology
- Imre Szenczy (1798–1860) floristics
- Gabriella Szentpéteri (1927–1969) plant morphology
- Rezső Szép (1860–1918) floristics
- Júlia Szepes (1913–1987) plant morphology, phytopathology
- János Szepesfalvy (1882–1959) bryology, paleobotany
- Zoltán Szilády (1878–1947) floristics
- István Szodfridt (born 1930) dendrology, history of botany
- Miklós Szontágh (1843–1899) floristics
- Gyula Szökő (1934–1974) phytopathology
- Mihály Szörényi (1881–1963) horticulture
- Júlia Szujkóné Lacza (born 1930) floristics, dendrology, plant morphology
- Frigyes Szutorisz (1854–1926) floristics

== T ==
- Pál Tallós (1931–1968) forestry, phytosociology
- Géza Tamássy (1887–1971) floristics
- Károly Tamássy (1806–1885) pomology
- Gyula Ágoston Tauscher (1832–1882) floristics
- Károly Téglás (1864–1916) forestry
- András Terpó (born 1925) pomology
- Lajos Thaisz (1867–1937) agricultural botany, floristics
- Lajos Timár (1918–1956) floristics, phytosociology, mycology
- György Timkó (1881–1945) lichenology
- Lajos Tőkés (1873–1951) floristics, phytogeography
- Róbert Trautmann (1873–1953) plant systematics
- János Tuzson (1870–1943) plant morphology, plant systematics, floristics, phytopathology, mycology, paleobotany

== U ==
- Gábor Ubrizsy (1919–1973) phytopathology, mycology, herbology
- Gábor Uherkovich (1912–2002) phycology
- József Ujhelyi (1910–1979) floristics, plant systematics
- Miklós Ujvárosi (1913–1981) agricultural botany, floristics, herbology
- Ferenc Uzonyi (1884–1972) phytopathology

== V ==
- Dezső Vágújfalvi (born 1936) plant physiology, phytochemistry
- Ernő Vajda (1889–1980) floristics
- László Vajda (1890–1986) floristics
- Oszkár Varga (1873–1947) plant physiology
- István Velich (1870–1960) pomology
- Klára Verseghy (1930–2020) lichenology
- Antal Veszelszki (c. 1730 – 1798) floristics
- György Vette (1645–1704) phytopathology
- Gábor Vida (1935–2022) floristics, plant systematics, pteridológia
- Aladár Visnya (1878–1959) bryology
- Márton Vrabély (1808–1877) floristics

== W ==
- János Wágner (1870–1955) floristics, dendrology
- Richárd Wagner (1905–1972) plant ecology
- Antal Waisbecker (1835–1916) floristics
- Ferenc Ádám Waldstein-Wartenberg (1759–1823) floristics
- Lajos Walz (1845–1914) floristics
- János Jakab Wernischek (1743–1804) plant systematics
- Péter Wierzbicki (1794–1847) floristics
- János Teofil Windisch (1689–1732) floristics
- József Jakab Winterl (1739–1809) plant systematics, pomology
- András Rafael Wolny (1759–1827) floristics

== Z ==
- Vilmos Zoltán (1869–1929) floristics
- Bálint Zólyomi (1908–1997) növényszármazástan, phytosociology, palynology
- Zoltán Zsák (1880–1966) agricultural botany, floristics, herbology

== See also ==
- List of botanists

== Sources ==
- Magyar életrajzi lexikon 1000–1990 [Hungarian biographical encyclopaedia from 1000 until 1990], Budapest, Arcanum, 2001.
- Magyarország a XX. században [Hungary in the 20th century], vol. 4, Szekszárd, Babits, 2000, pp. 481–489.
- Homepage of the Hungarian Academy of Sciences
