= Paal =

Paal may refer to:

== Places ==
- Paal, Belgium, a town in Limburg
- Paal, Netherlands, a village in Zeeland
- Paal, Mainpuri, or Pal, a village in Uttar Pradesh, India

== People ==
- Paal Kibsgaard (born 1967), Norwegian petroleum engineer and businessman, chairman and CEO of Schlumberger
- Árpád Paál (1889–1943), Hungarian plant physiologist
- György Paál, Hungarian astronomer
- Heinrich Paal, Estonian footballer
