= Atanasie Marian Marienescu =

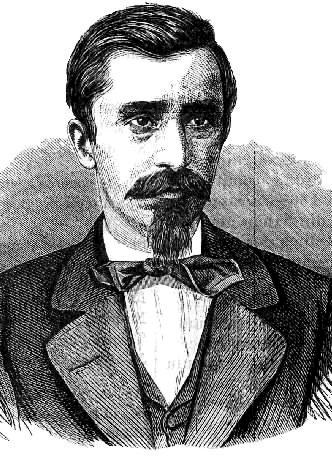
Atanasie Marian Marienescu

Atanasie Marian Marienescu (March 21 [O.S. March 9] 1830 – January 20 [O.S. January 7] 1915) was an Austro-Hungarian ethnic Romanian folklorist, ethnographer and judge.

Born in Lipova, Arad County, in the Banat region, his father Ion Marian was a trader, while his mother Persida (née Șandor) came from Nădlac. After completing the Romanian-language primary school in his native town in 1842, he enrolled in the Minorite gymnasium of Arad. He finished six grades there, interrupting his studies for a year due to the 1848 revolution. He took grade seven in Timișoara and the final year in Pest, prior to entering the law faculty of the Royal University of Pest. While in the city, he frequently visited Emanoil Gojdu. He studied there for three years before transferring to the University of Vienna, from which he graduated in 1856. He received a doctorate in 1861 and settled in Lugoj, working as deputy notary. The following year, he became an assessor, which marked the beginning of his career in the magistracy; he worked in the town until 1869. Active within the Romanian Orthodox Church, he served the Arad Diocese in a lay capacity.

In 1865, he married Ana, one of eleven children born to Ioan Brote of Rășinari, Sibiu County; her brother was the politician Eugen Brote. Following his work in Lugoj, he became an assessor at Oravița, where he befriended Simeon Mangiuca, and transferred to Timișoara in 1876. In 1880, he was appointed to the Curia Regia in Budapest, and became a full member in 1885. He then moved to the Curia Regia in Oradea, serving until his retirement in 1900. From that point until his death, he lived in Sibiu. He is buried next to his wife in the Dumbrava Sibiului cemetery. The couple had a daughter and a son.

Aside from law, Marienescu's interests lay in literature, ethnography, history and especially folklore. He made his published debut in 1848, with a poem that appeared in Pest's Amicul Poporului. Over the ensuing years, Marienescu contributed to numerous publications, mainly from Transylvania: Foaia pentru minte, animă și literatură, Gazeta de Transilvania, Familia, Telegraful Român, Aurora română, Albina, Almanahul Societății de Lectură "Petru Maior" (Budapest), Amicul școalei, Analele Academiei Române, Aurora română, Calendarul diecezan, Columna lui Traian, Concordia, Dâmbovița, Educatorul, Ethnographia, Ethnologische Mitteilungen aus Ungarn, Federațiunea, Foișoara Telegrafului român, Gazeta poporului, Luminătorul, Naționalul, Opinca, Romänische Revue and Transilvania.

While a student in Pest, he diligently researched archives and libraries for historic and topographic data related to the origin of the Romanians. His first folklore collections, the 1859 Poesie poporală. Balade culese și corese and Colinde, were published with funds donated by Andrei Mocioni and received an enthusiastic endorsement from Iacob Mureșianu. The former marked the first Transylvanian collection of ballads, while the latter was the first anthology of Christmas carols in all the Romanian lands. Poesia popurala. Balade culese și corese appeared in 1867, followed by Doi feți cotofeṭi sau doi copii cu părul de aur (1871), Seran și Zoran (1872) and Steaua Magilor sau Cântece la Nașterea Domnului Isus Cristos (1875). His novella Petru Rareș, principele Moldovei appeared in 1862. He was elected a corresponding member of the Romanian Academy in 1877, rising to titular member in 1881; his reception speech, on Petru Maior, was hailed by V. A. Urechia. In 1884, Sărbătorile și datinile romane vechi, the first volume of a planned monumental Cultul păgân și creștin appeared; he was unable to complete the remainder of the treatise. A diary of his survives covering two periods: his student days from 1853 to 1858, and two months in the summer of 1875. He was described by Ovidiu Bârlea as a "notorious polymath" who "delved into nearly every branch of the humanities: literature, history, ethnography, folklore, political economy" and became "Transylvania's first important folklorist".
