= András Lévai =

András Lévai may refer to:

- András Lévai (engineer) (1908–2003), Hungarian engineer
- András Lévai (footballer) (born 1973), Hungarian footballer
