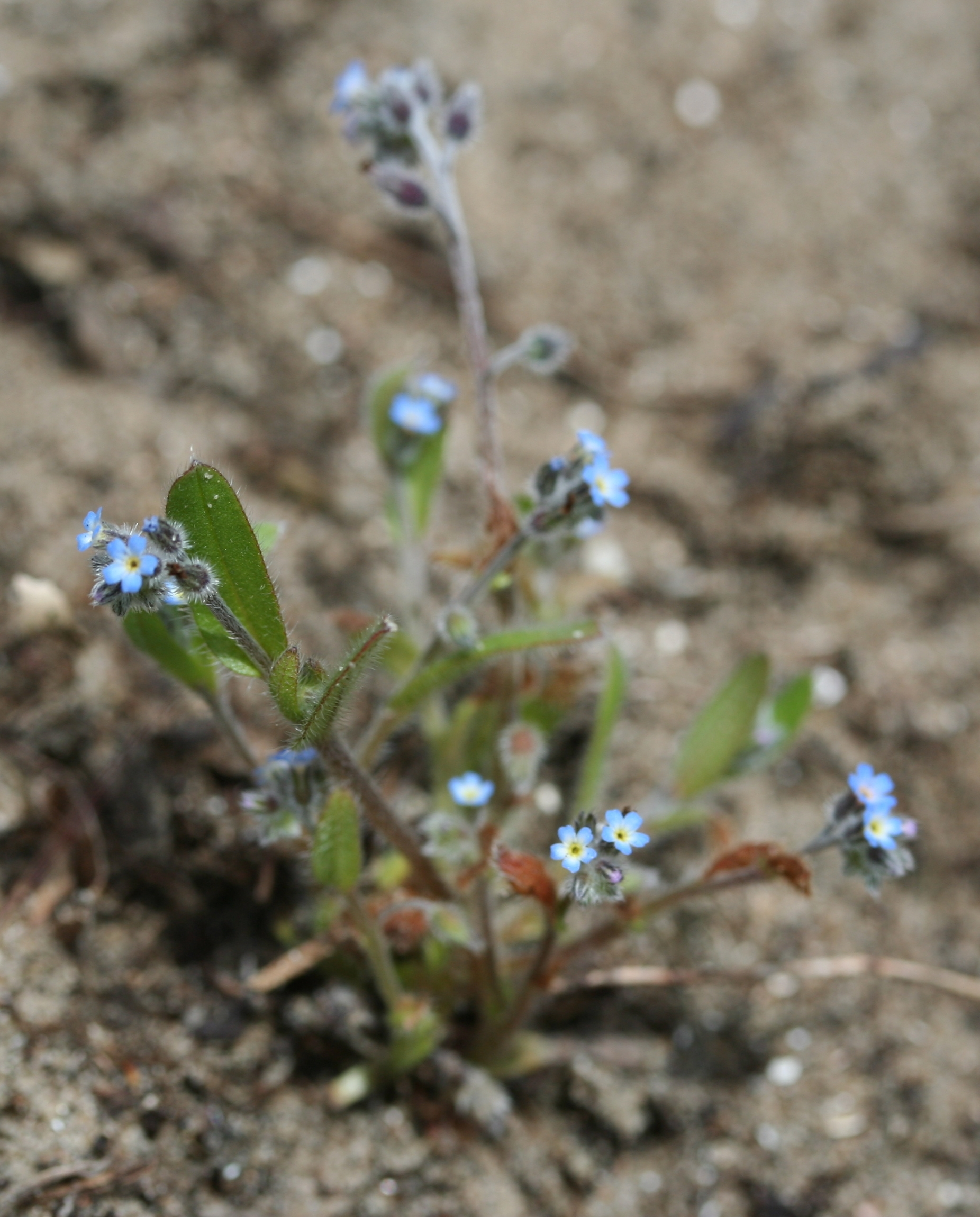

Scientific classification
- Kingdom: Plantae
- Clade: Tracheophytes
- Clade: Angiosperms
- Clade: Eudicots
- Clade: Asterids
- Order: Boraginales
- Family: Boraginaceae
- Genus: Myosotis
- Species: M. ramosissima

Binomial name
- Myosotis ramosissima Rochel

= Myosotis ramosissima =

Species of flowering plant

Myosotis ramosissima, the early forget-me-not, is a flowering plant species in the family Boraginaceae. Its habitats include prairies, roadsides, and grassy embankments.
