= Carex fritschii =

Scientific classification
- Kingdom: Plantae
- Clade: Tracheophytes
- Clade: Angiosperms
- Clade: Monocots
- Clade: Commelinids
- Order: Poales
- Family: Cyperaceae
- Genus: Carex
- Species: C. fritschii

Binomial name
- Carex fritschii Waisb.

Synonyms
- Carex montana subsp. fritschii (Waisb.) O.Schwarz

Species of grass-like plant

Carex fritschii is a species of sedge (family Cyperaceae), native to central Europe. Preferring to grow in sandy or gravelly soils in well-lit oak woodlands, its chromosome number is 2n = 30.
