= JAV =

JAV or Jav may refer to:

== Places ==
- Ilulissat Airport (IATA airport code JAV), Greenland
- Jebel Ali Village, a neighbourhood in Dubai, UAE

== People ==
- Javier (name), diminutive "Jav"
- Sándor Jávorka (1883–1961), Hungarian botanist

== Groups, organizations ==
- Jordan Aviation (ICAO airline code JAV), an airline based in Jordan
- Jugend- und Auszubildendenvertretung, the German Youth and Trainees Council

== Other uses ==
- Japanese Adult Video
- Javanese language (ISO 639 language code jav)
- Yav or Jav, the material world in Eastern Slavic mythology

== See also ==
- Journal of the American Viola Society (JAVS)
