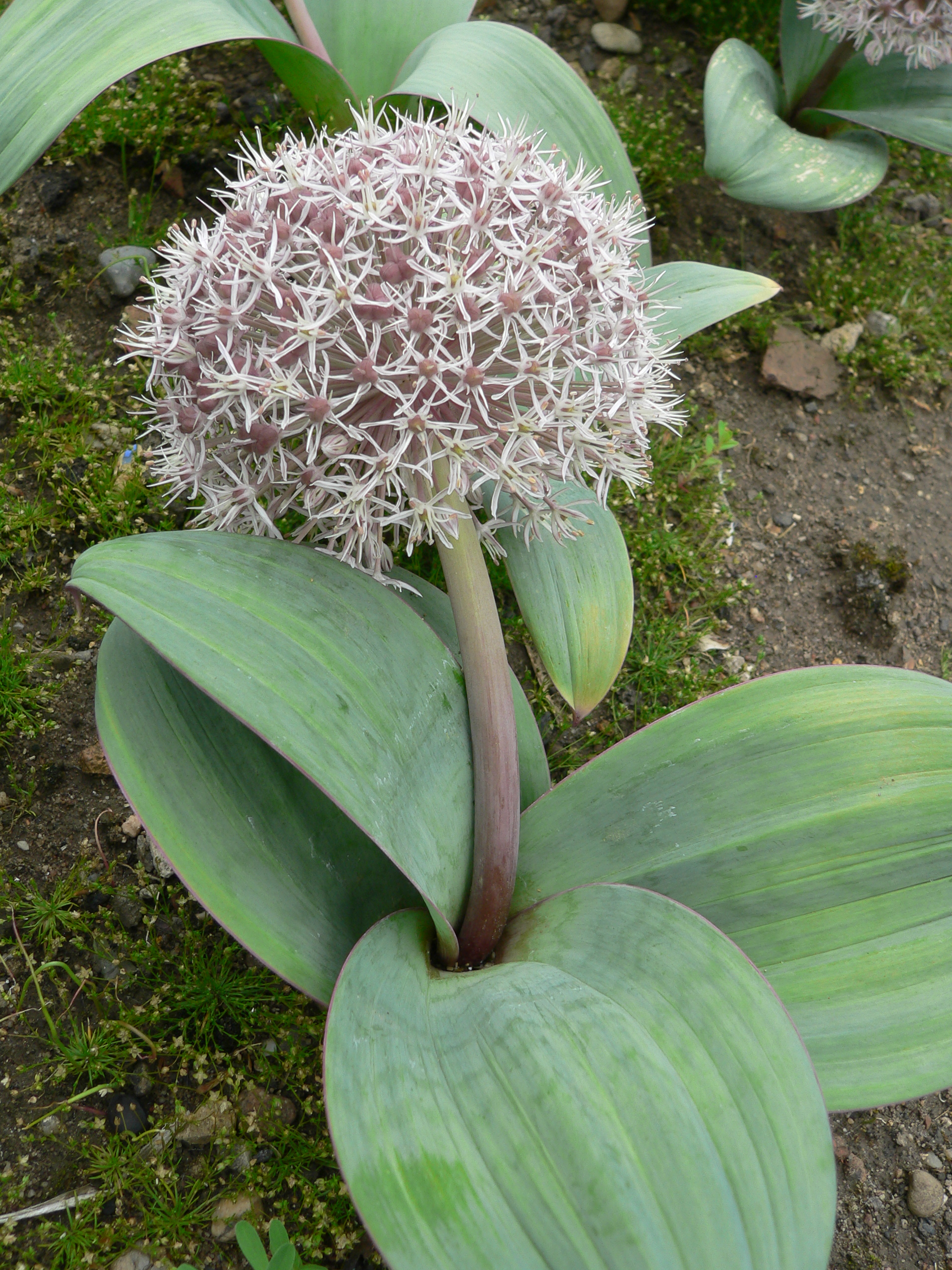

Scientific classification
- Kingdom: Plantae
- Clade: Tracheophytes
- Clade: Angiosperms
- Clade: Monocots
- Order: Asparagales
- Family: Amaryllidaceae
- Subfamily: Allioideae
- Genus: Allium
- Subgenus: Allium subg. Melanocrommyum
- Species: A. karataviense

Binomial name
- Allium karataviense Regel

Synonyms
- Allium cabulicum (Baker); Allium karataviense var. granitovii (Priszter); Allium karataviense subsp. henrikii (Rukšans 2007, not validly published because described in seed catalog without Latin description); Allium singulifolium (Rech.f.)

= Allium karataviense =

Species of flowering plant

Allium karataviense is a species of onion in the Amaryllis family. It is commonly known as Turkistan onion or ornamental onion.

It is native to Afghanistan, Kazakhstan, Kyrgyzstan, Tajikistan, and Uzbekistan, and is cultivated elsewhere as an ornamental plant. It has been selected for the Great Plant Picks list of outstanding plants for the maritime Pacific Northwest. The Latin specific epithet karataviense means of the Karatau Mountains in Kazakhstan, in reference to the plant's native range.

== Description ==
Allium karataviense is an herbaceous, bulb-forming species. It produces a basal rosette of wide, arching leaves. Basal leaves are broad-elliptic, spreading, gray-green, and appear in pairs. Flowers are lilac to pink in color and have a mild fragrance.
