= Hugó Lojka =

Hungarian lichenologist

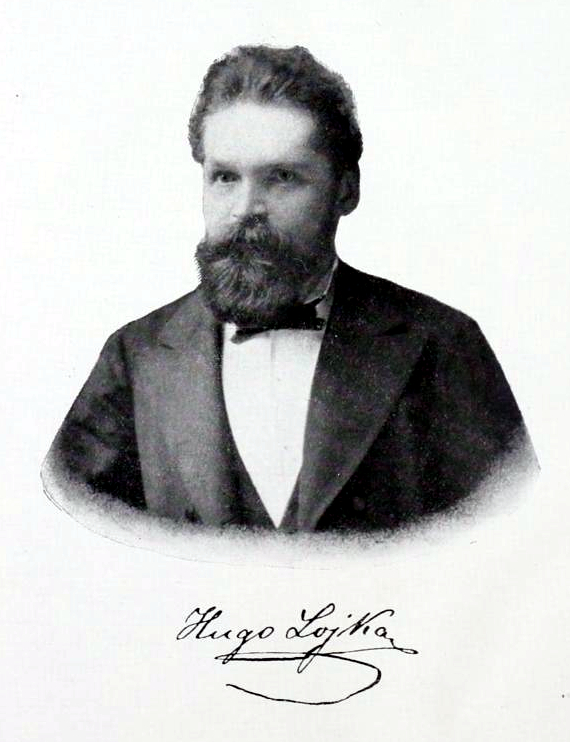
- Photograph and signature of Lojka
- Born: 6 January 1845; Sahirne (Stryj), Ukraine
- Died: 7 September 1887 (aged 42); Budapest, Hungary
- Scientific career
- Fields: Botany, cryptogamology, lichenology
- Author abbrev. (botany): Lojka

Hugó Lojka (6 January 1845 – 7 September 1887) was a teacher and lichenologist. He was one of the first researchers of Hungarian cryptogams, especially lichens. He was an ethnic Hungarian working in Austria-Hungary.

== Life ==
Lojka was born on 6 January 1845 in Gelsendorf (Zahirne) in Galicia. His father was an evangelical minister from Moravia who had become a naturalized citizen of Hungary, and instilled a love of Hungarian nationality in his children. The young Lojka attended elementary school in Stryi, four classes of middle school in Lviv, and the remainder of his schooling in Eperjes, where the relatives of his father's first wife lived. Lojka attended the University of Vienna during 1862 to 1868. He studied to become a physician, although he spent much of his time in the study of botany. Circumstances prevented him from completing his medical degree, so he went to Budapest. There he obtained a teacher's certificate in mathematics, physics, and chemistry, and went on to become a teacher. He taught first at a junior high school, later at an urban girls' school, and finally at the state girls' high school. In 1884, Lojka collected lichens in Tirolia distributing them under the title Iter Tirolense 1884. In 1886, on his return from an extended journey in Transylvania, he contracted pleurisy, which compelled him to give up teaching. He died on 7 September 1887, at the age of 42.

Lojka collected lichens from all over Hungary from 1862 until his death with an exsiccata called Lichenotheca regni Hungarici exsiccati (1882–1884). His herbarium was purchased by the Vienna National History Museum. Outside of Europe, specimens collected by Lojka are held by Te Papa and the National Herbarium of Victoria, Royal Botanic Gardens Victoria. Lojka was also sent specimens from foreign collectors for identification or for circulation in his published exsiccatae (sets of dried herbarium specimens for limited distribution). Examples include lichens collected by New Zealand physician and botanist Charles Knight and by Australian naturalist Richard Helms that were included in Lojka's Lichenotheca Universalis (1885–1886).

== Eponymy ==
Lojka has had many species named in his honour. These include:

Amphisphaeria lojkae Rehm (1906); Biatora lojkana J.Lahm; Biatorina lojkana J.Lahm (1876); Caloplaca lojkae Servít & Nádv. (1936); Gloniopsis lojkae Rehm (1906); Helminthocarpon lojkanum Müll.Arg. (1887); Lachnea lojkaeana Rehm (1895); Lecanora lojkae Vain. (1899); Lecanora lojkaeana Szatala (1954); Lecanora lojkahugoi S.Y.Kondr., Lőkös & Hur (2015); Lecidea lojkae Szatala (1932); Lichinella lojkana Hue (1898); Parmelia lojkana Gyeln. (1932); Polyblastia lojkana Zschacke (1914); Puccinia lojkaiana Thüm. (1876); Pyrenopeziza lojkae Rehm (1870); Ramalina lojkana Motyka (1961); Ranunculus lojkae Sommier et Levier; Sagedia lojkana Poetsch (1872); Sordaria lojkaeana Rehm (1888); Sychnogonia lojkana Hazsl. (1884); Thelidium lojkanum Szatala (1925); Thelopsis lojkana Nyl. (1881); and Verrucaria lojkae Servít (1946).

== See also ==
- List of Hungarian botanists
