= Oravice =

Oravice may refer to:

- Oravița, a town in southwestern Romania
- Oravice (Slovakia), a town in northern Slovakia
