= Simeon Mangiuca =

Austro-Hungarian ethnic Romanian folklorist

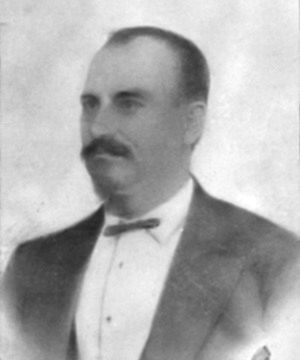
Simeon Mangiuca

Simeon Mangiuca (2 September 1831 – 4 December [O.S. 22 November] 1890) was an Austro-Hungarian ethnic Romanian folklorist.

Born in Broșteni, Caraș-Severin County, in the Banat region, his father Ioachim was a Romanian Orthodox priest; his mother Calina (née Berceanu) died of tuberculosis when Simeon and his brother were young. Following primary school in his native village, he attended secondary school in nearby Oravița before going on to Szeged, Lugoj and Oradea. He studied law at the Royal University of Pest from 1852 to 1855. While there, he began learning the Romance languages, particularly Italian and Spanish. He subsequently went to Vršac (Vârșeț), where he took theology from 1856 to 1858, upon his father's insistence. Later, his theological studies would be useful in his research on folk practices, and he also learned Serbian while in the town. In 1858, he was named a government lawyer in Timișoara and a teacher of Romanian language and literature at the gymnasium in the same city. Also in 1858, he married Ana Miletici, the daughter of a large landowner from Oravița. As a teacher, he was intensely involved in Romanian cultural activity. When political conditions allowed, he pressed for the establishment of a Romanian-language newspaper in Timișoara, believing that this was the best means of organizing a populace that had become passive following the 1848 revolution. In 1861, he was elected chief administrator for the Jamu Mare district by the voters of his county, and he held the post for some eight years. In 1868, he passed the bar examination; the following year, he left government administration and settled as a lawyer in Oravița.

Popular with those around him, Mangiuca was a leader of the local Romanian community. He was friends with Atanasie Marian Marienescu, whom some claim introduced Mangiuca to folklore, although this is disputed. While Marienescu was an ardent collector of folklore, Mangiuca's collecting activity was limited to the songs for the dead published in two studies. By contrast, he was more valued as a historian, linguist and ethnologist, an exegete of folklore. He dedicated his free time to study and to writing. He regularly contributed articles to a number of Romanian publications in the empire, especially Albina (Vienna), Luminătoriul (Timișoara) and Familia (Oradea). In the latter magazine, he published studies about Baba Dochia, Romanian botanical terminology and Latin-origin words specific to the Banat dialect. He also wrote a number of books, and the Romanian Academy elected him an honorary member in March 1890. He suffered from a heart condition that threw him into depression, and he died later that year. He donated his rich personal library to Astra.
