= Adolf Humborg =

Austrian painter (1847–1921)

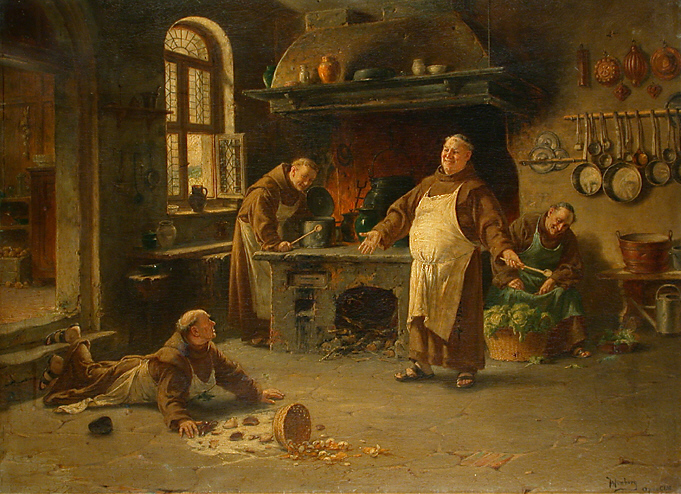
"In der Klosterküche" (In the Cloister's Kitchen)

Adolf Humborg (January 18, 1847 Oraviţa - April 14, 1921 Munich) was an Austrian painter. Humborg studied at the Art Academy in Vienna between 1867 and 1872. He then completed his studies at the Academy of Arts in Munich, where he attended the class of professor Alexander von Wagner (1838-1904).

Humborg specialized in painting scenes of monastic life and was renowned for his depictions of monks in humorous situations. The Glaspalast in Munich frequently exhibited his work between 1879 and 1911. Based on his success there, Humborg became a permanent resident of Munich in 1913. He also exhibited in London, where he was awarded the silver medal in 1893 and the bronze medal in 1894 for his work.

== Sources ==
- Revue roumaine d'histoire de l'art, Académie des Sciences Sociales et politiques de la République Socialiste de Roumanie, 1979, p. 70
