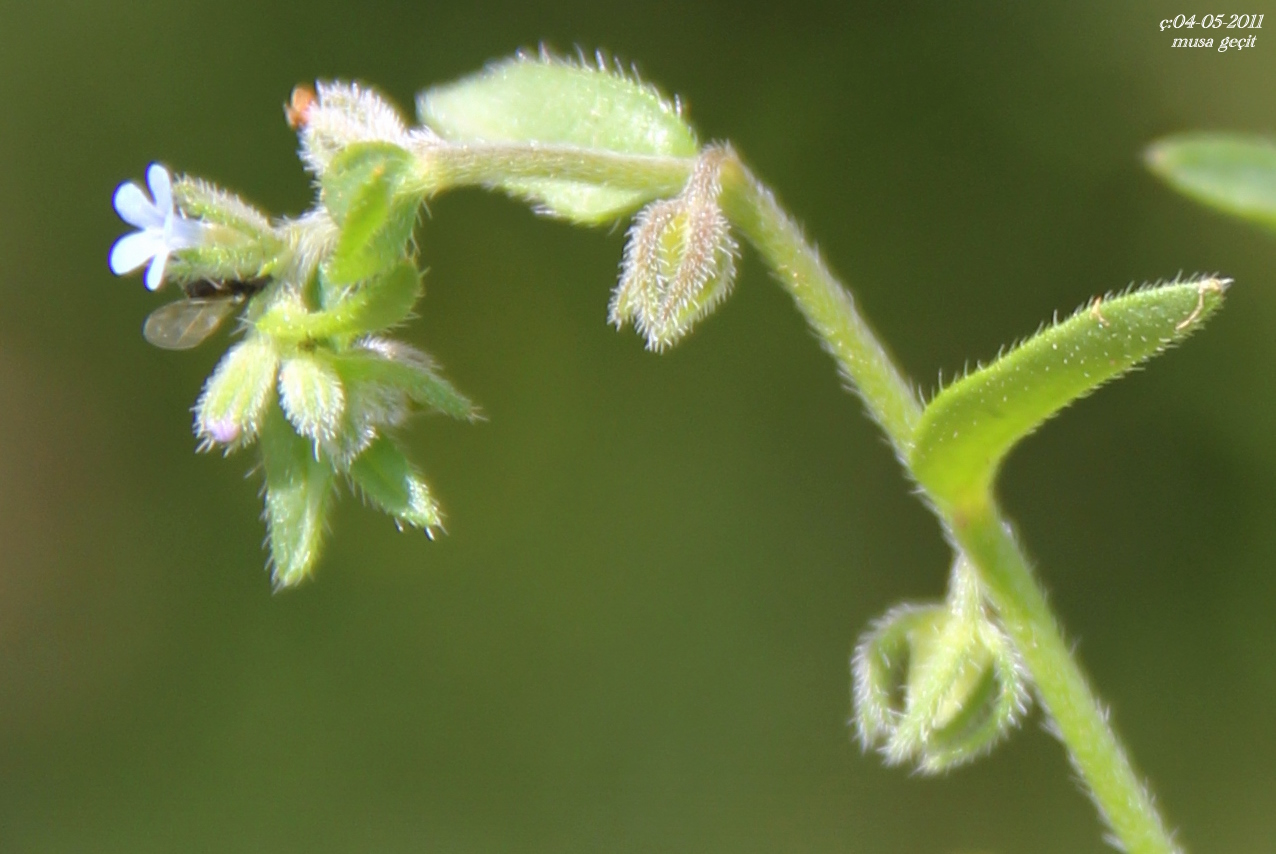
- Rochelia disperma, Mardin, Turkey

Scientific classification
- Kingdom: Plantae
- Clade: Tracheophytes
- Clade: Angiosperms
- Clade: Eudicots
- Clade: Asterids
- Order: Boraginales
- Family: Boraginaceae
- Genus: Rochelia; Rchb.

Synonyms
- Cervia Rodr. ex Lag.; Raclathris Raf.

= Rochelia =

Genus of plants

Rochelia is a genus of flowering plants belonging to the family Boraginaceae. It is also in subtribe Eritrichiinae.

Its wide native range extends from Europe (within Albania, Austria, Baltic States, Belarus, Belgium, Bulgaria, Central European Russia, Corsica, Crimean Peninsula, Czechoslovakia, Denmark, East European Russia, the Faroe Islands, Finland, France, Germany, Great Britain, Greece, Hungary, Iceland, Ireland, Italy, Netherlands, North European Russia, Norway, Poland, Romania, South European Russis, Spain, Sweden, Switzerland, Ukraine and Yugoslavia) to Asia (in Altai, Kazakhstan, Kyrgyzstan, Mongolia, North Caucasus, Tajikistan, Transcaucasus, Turkey, Turkmenistan, Tuva, Uzbekistan and Western Himalaya), Tibet and Xinjiang, (in China), north-western Africa (in Algeria, Morocco and Tunisia) and Western Asia (Afghanistan, Iran, Iraq, Lebanon, Syria, Oman, Pakistan and Palestine).

The genus name of Rochelia is in honour of Anton Rochel (1770–1847), an Austrian surgeon and naturalist, known for his botanical investigations of Banat and the Carpathians (Mountains). It was first described and published in Flora Vol.7 on page 243 in 1824.

The genus is recognized by the United States Department of Agriculture and the Agricultural Research Service and was last updated on 31 July 2018, but they only list 2 species; Rochelia disperma (L. f.) K. Koch and Rochelia stylaris Boiss.

It was found by DNA analysis, that Rochelia is not monophyletic but paraphyletic (has more than one common ancestor).

== Known species ==
According to Kew:

- Rochelia bungei Trautv.
- Rochelia campanulata Popov & Zakirov
- Rochelia cancellata Boiss. & Balansa
- Rochelia cardiosepala Bunge
- Rochelia chitralensis Y.J.Nasir
- Rochelia claviculata Popov & Zakirov
- Rochelia disperma (L.f.) K.Koch
- Rochelia drobovii (Popov) Khoshsokhan & Kaz.Osaloo
- Rochelia jackabaghii (Lipsky) Pavlov
- Rochelia laxa I.M.Johnst.
- Rochelia leiocarpa Ledeb.
- Rochelia leiosperma (Popov) Golosk.
- Rochelia mirheydari Riedl & Esfand.
- Rochelia pamirica Dengub.
- Rochelia peduncularis Boiss.
- Rochelia persica Bunge ex Boiss.
- Rochelia pygmaea Rech.f. & Riedl
- Rochelia rectipes Stocks
- Rochelia retorta (Pall.) Lipsky
- Rochelia retrosepala Khat.
- Rochelia sessiliflora (Boiss.) Khoshsokhan & Kaz.Osaloo
- Rochelia stylaris Boiss.
