= Lecanora lojkahugoi =

Scientific classification
- Kingdom: Fungi
- Division: Ascomycota
- Class: Lecanoromycetes
- Order: Lecanorales
- Family: Lecanoraceae
- Genus: Lecanora
- Species: L. lojkahugoi

Binomial name
- Lecanora lojkahugoi S.Y.Kondr., Lőkös & Hur (2015)

Species of lichen

Lecanora lojkahugoi is a species of saxicolous (rock-dwelling) crustose lichen in the family Lecanoraceae. It is found in the Russian Far East and in South Korea.

== Taxonomy ==
Lecanora lojkahugoi was formally described as a new species in 2015 by lichenologists Sergey Kondratyuk, Laszlo Lőkös, and Jae-Seoun Hur. The type specimen was collected from Khaldoj Bay in Cape Bruce near the Slavyanka settlement (Khasansky District, Primorsky Krai); there, the lichen was found growing on siliceous rocks along the sea coast. The species epithet honours Hungarian lichenologist Hugó Lojka. The authors note that a similar Lecanora species, L. lojkaeana, is also named after Lojka.

== Description ==
The thick, crustose thallus of Lecanora lojkahugoi is bluish grey to whitish grey and measures 1–2 cm (0.4–0.8 in) in diameter, although neighbouring individuals may coalesce to form larger spots up to several centimetres across. Thalli comprise convex areoles that are typically 0.2–0.5 mm across, although sometimes the areoles aggregate together to form larger structures (conareoles) up to 2 mm across. Another feature of the thallus are the accumulations of soredia that aggregate on the edges of or between the areoles. A thin (0.2–0.6 mm) blackish hypothallus is evident at the edges of the thallus, or where the lichen contacts another saxicolous lichen. Apothecia made by Lecanora lojkahugoi are lecanorine in form, with an apothecial margin extending beyond the rim of the brown disc, and a diameter of up to 0.7 mm.

The expected results of standard chemical spot tests are: thallus K+ (yellow), C+ (yellow/orange), KC+ (yellow), and P+ (light yellow).

The morphologically similar and similarly named Lecanora lojkaeana is distinguished from L. lojkahugoi by differences in the thallus structure, including the lack of radiating areoles, concave soralia, and a greenish soredia-like mass.

== Habitat and distribution ==
Shortly after its original description from specimens collected from the type locality in the Russian Far East, Lecanora lojkahugoi was recorded in several locations in South Korea. Associated lichens in these Korean locales include Pertusaria flavescens, Candelaria concolor, Phaeophyscia orbicularis, Buellia stellulata, Yoshimuria spodoplaca, and Lecanora oreinoides.

== See also ==
- List of Lecanora species
