= Anton Rochel =

Austrian naturalist (1770–1847)

Anton Rochel (18 June 1770 in Neunkirchen – 12 May 1847 in Graz) was an Austrian surgeon and naturalist, known for his botanical investigations of Banat and the Carpathians.

Up until 1798 he served as a surgeon in the Austrian army, then from 1798 to 1820 worked as a physician in Moravia and Hungary. From 1820 to 1840 he was a curator at the botanical garden in Pest. In 1835 he undertook a botanical expedition to the Banat with József Dorner and János Heuffel .

The botanical genus Rochelia (in the family Boraginaceae) was named in his honor by Ludwig Reichenbach in 1824.

== Published works ==
- Naturhistorische miscellen uber den nordwestlichen Karpath in ober-Ungarn, 1821 – Natural history notes on the northwestern Carpathians in upper Hungary.
- Plantae Banatus rariores: iconibus et descriptionibus illustratae, 1828.
- Botanische Reise in das Banat im Jahre 1835 nebst Gelegenheits-Bemerkungen, 1838 – Botanical journey to Banat in 1835.
