= Zoltán Szabó (botanist) =

Hungarian botanist (1882–1944)

Zoltán Szabó (1882 -1944) was a Hungarian botanist, geneticist, and professor. He was a full member of the Hungarian Academy of Sciences. His work covered many areas of botany, including plant taxonomy, plant morphology and anatomy, plant geography and floristics, agrobotany and mycology, but he achieved his most significant results in genetic research. Szabó edited the exsiccata Plantae imperii Hungarici. In the taxonomic literature his name abbreviation is "Szabó".

== Career ==
Szabó entered the Eötvös Loránd University in 1900, and obtained his doctorate at the University of Breslau in 1905, where he was assistant professor in the Department of Botany from 1905 to 1905. From 1905 to 1941 he held posts at Eötvös Loránd University, Budapest University of Technology and Economics, the Royal Hungarian Veterinary College, and Pázmány Péter Catholic University.

Sazbo was a member of the Hungarian Academy of Sciences, the Royal Hungarian Society of Natural Sciences, the Hungarian Psychological Society. He was awarded the Corvin Wreath in 1941.

== Major publications ==
- Monographie der Gattung ″Knautia″ Inaugural-Dissertation). Budapest: Akadémia. 1911.
- Útmutató növények gyűjtésére, konzerválására, növénygyűjtemények berendezésére és növénytani megfigyelésre. Budapest: Királyi Magyar Természettudományi Társulat. 1913.
- A növények szervezete: Az általános növénytan elemei. Budapest: Centrum. 1922.
- A növények életmódja. Budapest: Szent István Társulat. 1925.
- A szobai növények élete és gondozása. Budapest: Királyi Magyar Természettudományi Társulat. 1928.
- A kromoszóma. Budapest: Királyi Magyar Természettudományi Társulat. 1936.
- Az átöröklés: Az általános örökléstudomány elemei figyelemmel a gazdasági és orvosi vonatkozásokra. Budapest: Királyi Magyar Természettudományi Társulat. 1938.
- A Cephalaria-génusz monográfiája. Budapest: Magyar Tudományos Akadémia. 1940.
- A sejt szerkezete és élete. Budapest: Egyetemi ny. 1941. (Entz Gézával)
- Származás és öröklődés. Budapest: Magyar Szemle Társaság. 1942.
