= Kálmán Kerpely =

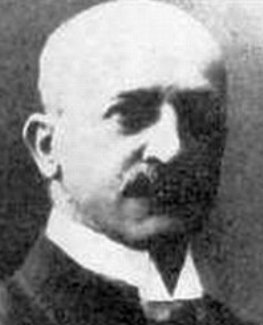
- Born: October 11, 1864
- Died: June 24, 1940 (aged 75)
- Education: Academy of Mining and Forestry, Martin Luther University
- Organization: Hungarian Academy of Sciences
- Known for: Agronomist, agrochemist

Kálmán Kerpely (Oravicabánya, Hungary [today Oraviţa, Romania], 11 October 1864 – Budapest, Hungary, 24 June 1940) agronomist, agrochemist, a corresponding member of the Hungarian Academy of Sciences.

== Education ==
He attended the Academy of Mining and Forestry in Selmecbánya (Hungary, today in Slovakia), then from 1881 until 1884 the Agricultural High College in Keszthely (Hungary).

In 1889-1890 he gained the scholarship of the Ministry of Agriculture to study agricultural matters at the Martin Luther University (Germany).

== Career ==
After his return he was appointed to the Agricultural High College

in Keszthely as professor of the agricultural botany, plant anatomy and phytopathology.

In 1892 he occupied the position offered to him at the Debrecen Agricultural High College, between 1899 and 1904, then from 1908 until 1913 he was the director of the institute. In 1897 he organised a tobacco breeding station near Debrecen (Pallagpuszta). In 1920 he left Debrecen and moved to the Péter Pázmany University where he was the first professor of plant breeding until his retirement in 1935.

His research mainly focused on the soil conditioning and on fertilizers, but he also improved the agrotechnology of tobacco and rye cultivation. He thoroughly studied the physico-chemical properties of soil, relationship between the water content and circuit and the crop quality.

For nearly half a century he was a prominent figure of the Hungarian agricultural education.

== Honors ==
In 1922 he was elected corresponding member of the Hungarian Academy of Sciences.
