= Vera Csapody =

Hungarian botanist (1890–1985)

Vera Csapody (1890–1985) was a Hungarian botanist, author, and botanical illustrator known for studying and painting the flora of Hungary with Sándor Jávorka. Over 11,000 of her illustrations are held by the Hungarian Natural History Museum. The standard author abbreviation Csapody is used to indicate this person as the author when citing a botanical name.
