= András Lévai (engineer) =

Hungarian engineer (1908-2003)

- Born: 22 December 1908; Oravița, Romania
- Died: 23 April 2003 (aged 94); Budapest
- Education: Budapest University of Technology
- Scientific career
- Fields: Electrical engineering

András Lévai (22 December 1908 - 23 April 2003) was a Hungarian scientist in the field of electrical engineering, professor, member of the Hungarian Academy of Sciences.

== Biography ==
He was born in 1908 in Oravița, Romania.

He graduated from the Technical College in Graz in 1926 and continued his education at the Technical College of Vienna, from which he graduated in 1931. After graduation, from 1932 to 1939, he worked as the chief engineer of the Titan-Nedrag-Klan metallurgical plant, and from 1939 to 1940, as an engineer for refining in Ploiești.

In 1940, he immigrated from Romania to [Hungary. From 1940 to 1946, he worked at the steelworks and metallurgical plants in Chepel. From 1962 to 1967, he was deputy minister of heavy industry in Hungary.

In parallel with administrative work, he was engaged in teaching activities. From 1953 to 1976, he was a professor at the Chair of Heat Power Engineering at the Technical University of Budapest, from 1976 to 1978 he was a professor at the university, from 1969 to 1972, he was Deputy President of the Hungarian Academy of Sciences (BME). In the mid-1970s he taught in the Soviet Union to the Moscow Power Engineering Institute. From 1999 until his death, he was an honorary professor at the Technical University.

He was engaged in research on the practical use of various systems of power plants, was engaged in the modernization of existing in the country power plants, increasing their efficiency, eliminating pollution by power plants of the environment. Since the mid-1950s he studied the issues of locating nuclear power plants in the country. In 1982, with his direct participation, the first Hungarian nuclear power plant, the Paks Nuclear Power Plant, was put into operation.

== Literature ==
- Gazdaságossági kérdések egységes megítélésének szempontjai erőművek tervezésénél. Budapest: Mérnöki Továbbképző Intézet. 1951.
- Hőerőművek I–II. Budapest: Jegyzetsokszorosító. 1951.
- Atomerőművek. Budapest: Felsőoktatási Jegyzetellátó. 1956.
- Elméleti reaktortechnika I–III. Budapest: Budapesti Műszaki Egyetem. 1960–1963.
- Hőerőművek. Budapest: Budapesti Műszaki Egyetem. 1961.
- Reaktorszerkezetek. Budapest: Országos Atomenergia Bizottság. 1961.
- Atomtechnika I–IV. Budapest: Tankönyvkiadó. 1964.
- Maschinentechnische Einrichtungen der Wärmekraftwerke I–II. Leipzig: Verlag für Grundstoffindustrie. 1966–1968.
