= Zahirne =

Village in Polohy Raion (district), Zaporizhia Oblast (province), Ukraine

Coordinates: 47°34′04″N 36°10′19″E

Zahirne is a village in Zaporizhzhia Oblast, Ukraine. On June 16, 2024, it was reported that the Russian Army had captured the village.
