= Samuel Lasz =

Hungarian scientist

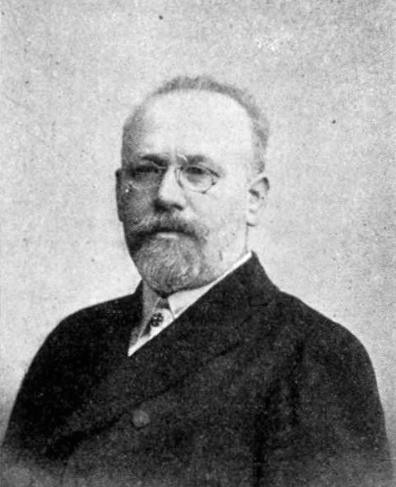

Samuel Lasz (18 December 1859, Szergeny – 8 June 1930, Budapest) was a Hungarian scientist.

Lasz studied at Pápa, Sopron, and Budapest. In 1882 he received an appointment at the state meteorological institute, where he researched climatology, zoology, and geology. In 1904 he was named professor at one of the gymnasiums of Budapest.

Lasz published the following works: A Vulkánizmuszról (Budapest, 1883), on volcanism; Szövő-Fonómesterek (ib. 1885, awarded a prize), on master-spiders; Egy Átkos Kis Légyről (ib. 1894, awarded a prize), on flies; and Lebens- und Charakterbild des Dr. Ludwig Lewis (ib. 1883).
