= Otto Orsós =

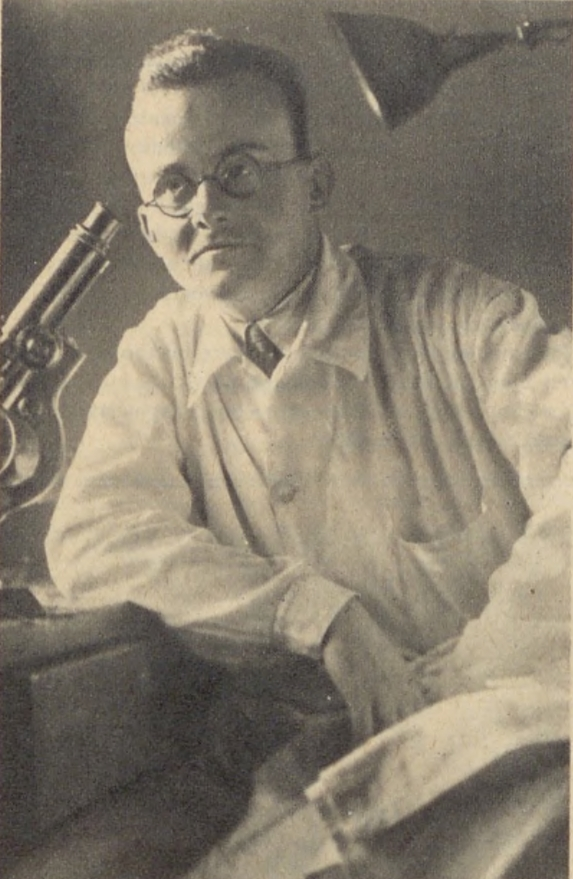

Ottó Orsós Orován (June 24, 1911 – September 1, 1939) was a Hungarian plant physiologist. He pioneered plant tissue culture, noting the effect of various hormones and chemicals to tissue differentiation.

== Life and work ==
Orsós was born in Budapest and studied natural sciences at the University of Budapest and became an assistant to Árpád Paál. He worked on the ideas of Gottlieb Haberlandt on totipotency at the Department of Plant Physiology. He was influenced by the ideas of Tivadar Huzella and around 1934 he conducted experiments to verify Haberlandt's ideas on a "wound hormone" which initiated the healing of plant wounds. He conducted experiments with kohrabi tissue cubes raised on sterile agar-agar cultures in petri dishes. Orsos suggested that the "lepton" of Haberlandt was tyrosine. He looked for the component that caused rhizogenesis by adding various extracts. He was able to regenerate complete plants from callus cultures, possibly among the first to achieve this, a decade ahead of Folke Skoog and Cheng Tsui who found the hormone-nutrient balance needed for callus differentiation in 1948. He committed suicide and died at Balatonfüred to escape fascism.
