= Paal, Netherlands =

Paal
- Hamlet
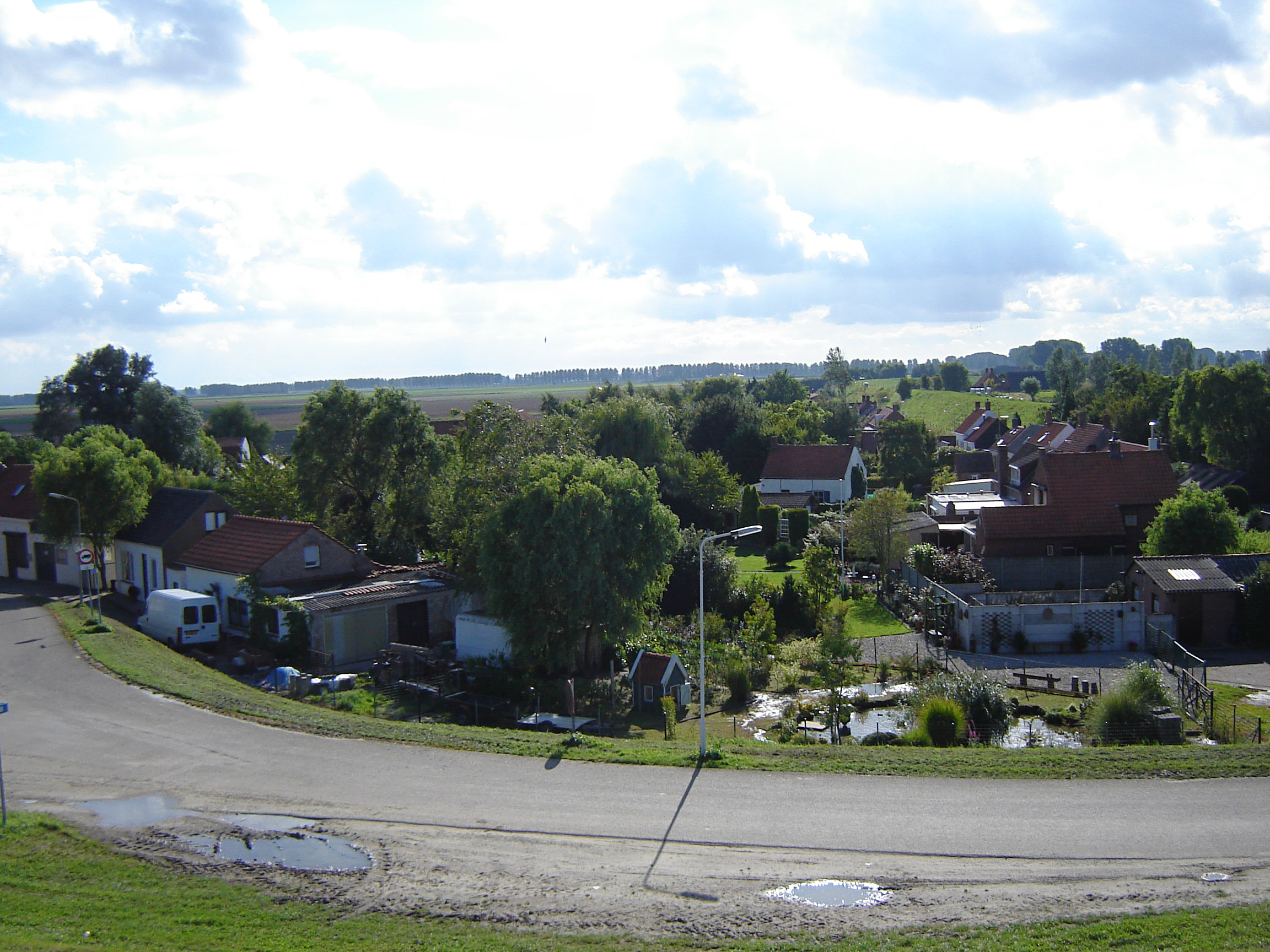
- View on Paal

- Location in the province of Zeeland in the Netherlands Paal (Netherlands)
- Coordinates: 51°21′16″N 04°06′27″E
- Country: Netherlands
- Province: Zeeland
- Municipality: Hulst

Area
  - Total: 0.12 km^{2} (0.046 sq mi)
- Elevation: 0.6 m (2.0 ft)

Population (2021)
  - Total: 75
  - Density: 630/km^{2} (1,600/sq mi)
- Time zone: UTC+1 (CET)
  - Summer (DST): UTC+2 (CEST)
- Postal code: 4569
- Dialing code: 0114

Paal is a hamlet in the southwest Netherlands. It is a part of the municipality of Hulst, Zeeland, and is located 35 km north of Antwerp, Belgium.

The village was first mentioned in 1847 as Paal (De), and refers to a beacon. From at least 1676 until 1874 there was a ferry to Bergen op Zoom at the location.

Paal used to be a fishing village which specialised in mussels. It was home to 412 people in 1840. In 1979, the dike was enlarged and the old harbour disappeared. In 1980, a marina was built instead.

Paal used to be part of the municipality of Graauw en Langendam. In 2003, it was merged into Hulst.

== Gallery ==
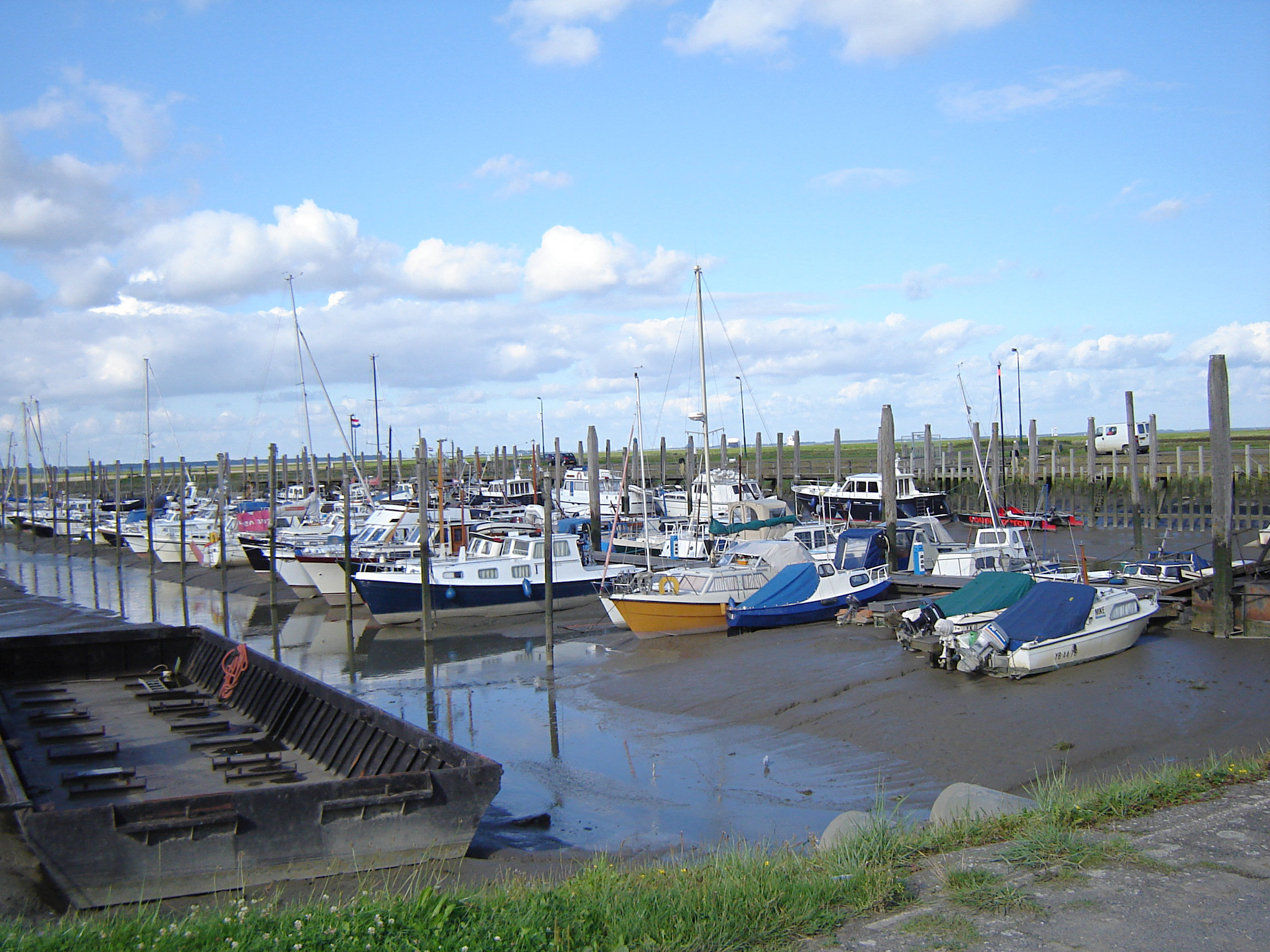
Harbour of Paal

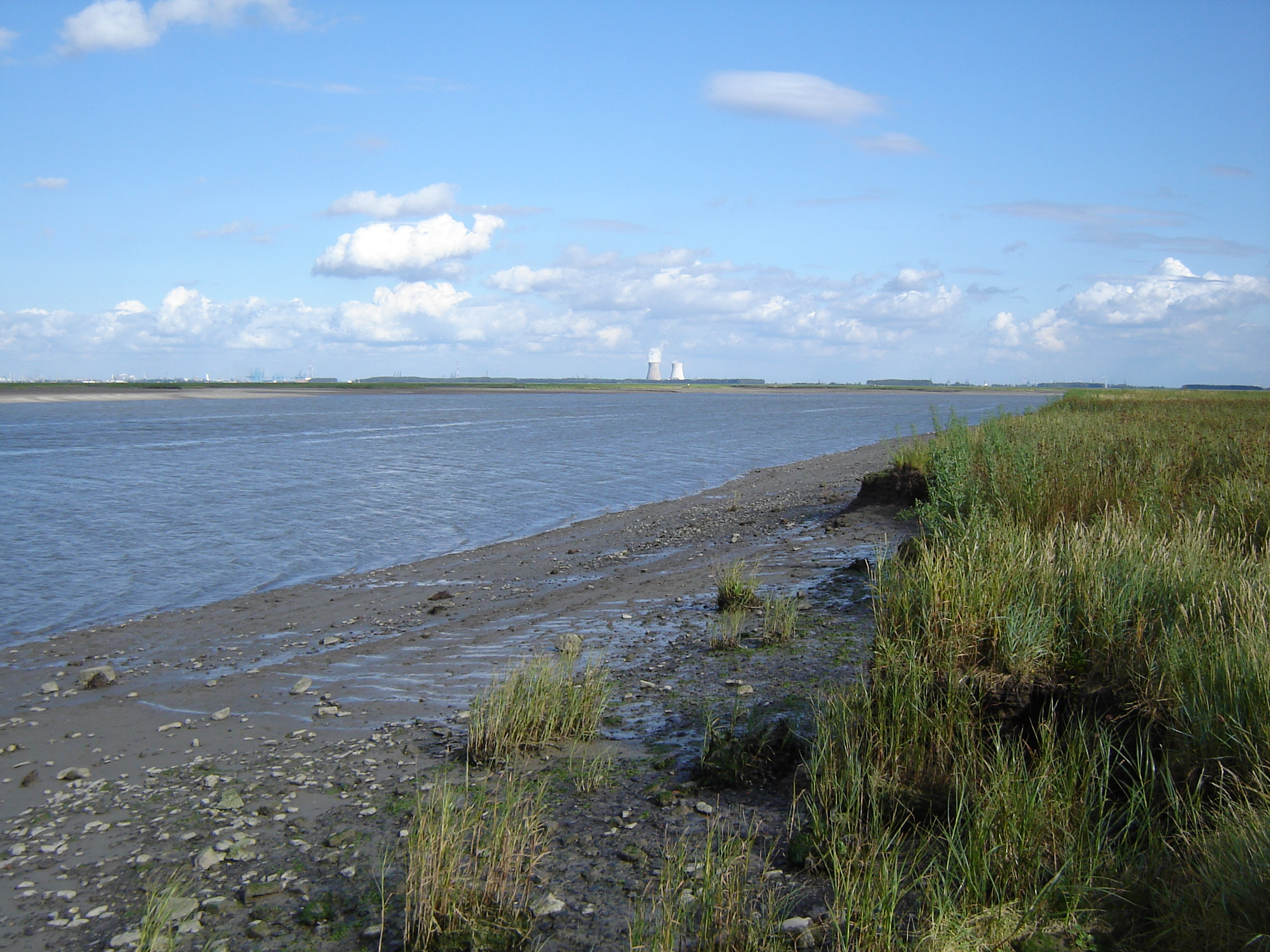
View on the Verdronken Land van Saeftinghe and the nuclear power plant of Doel
