= József Sadler =

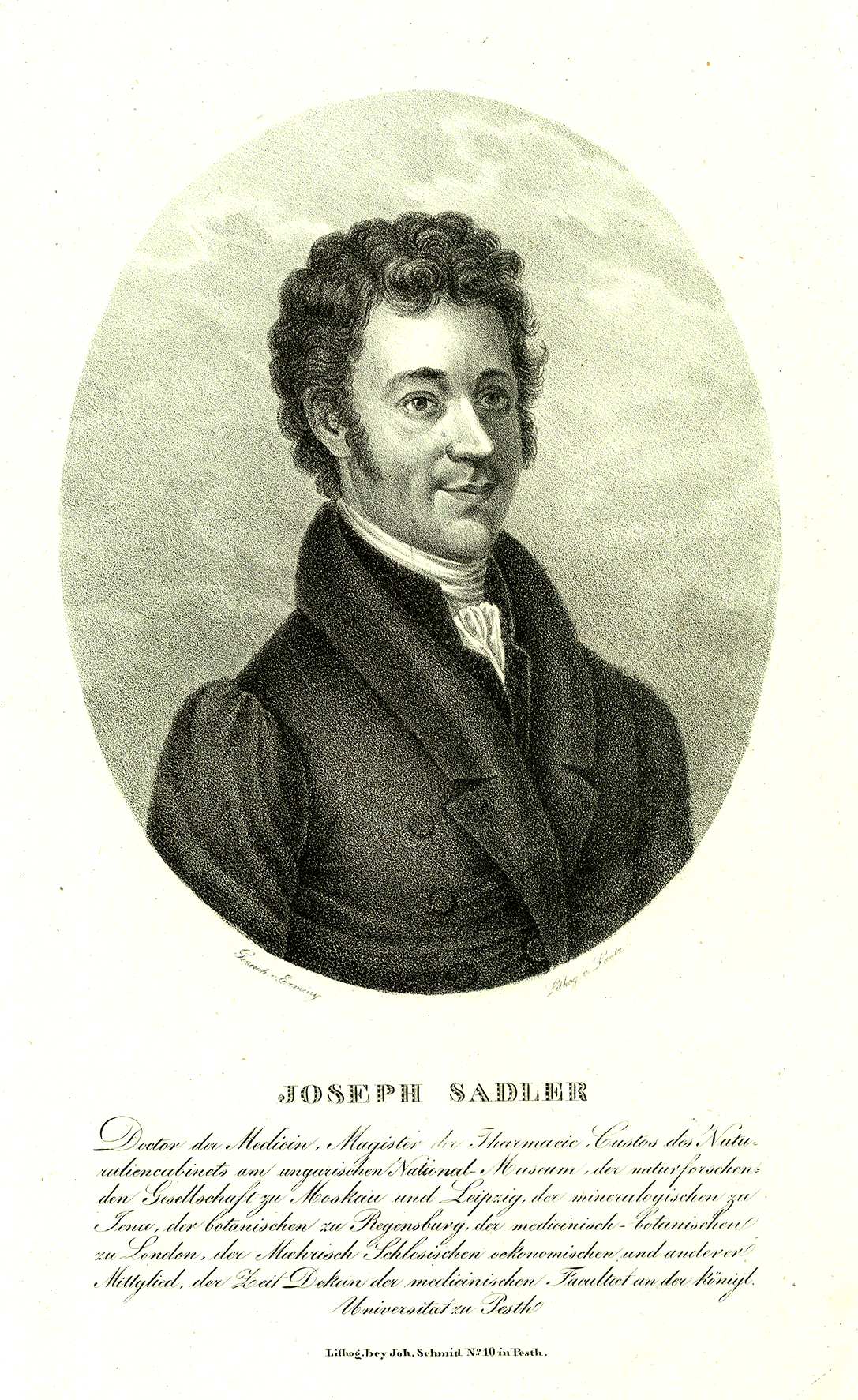
- Born: 6 May 1791; Bratislava
- Died: 12 March 1849 (aged 57)
- Occupation: Botanist, botanical collector, curator, scientific collector

József Sadler (6 May 1791 – 12 March 1849) was a Hungarian medical doctor and botanist. He studied the plants of the Budapest region, and served as a curator of natural history at the Hungarian National Museum. As a professor of botany at the medical school in the University of Pest, he influenced numerous Hungarian naturalists, including József Dorner.

Sadler was born in Pozsony in a family of modest means. After completing high school studies, Sadler became a pharmacist's assistant at the pharmacy of the Order of Mercy. He completed a pharmacy course at the University of Pest and received a master's degree in 1810. He also studied philosophy from 1810 to 1914 and medicine at Pest from 1812 to 1819. Sadler became an assistant to Károly Konstantin Haberle. He became a doctor of medicine in 1820. He was also made assistant keeper of the natural history collection at the National Museum. In 1832 he became an assistant professor of botany at the University of Pest becoming a full professor two years later. He also taught chemistry briefly. His students included the botanist Josif Pančić and the physician Ignaz Semmelweis.

Sadler was a member of the Moscow naturalists association, the Weimar mineralogical society and the Regensburg herbal society. Sadler collected plants extensively from the Budapest region. He edited two exsiccatae, namely A' Magyar Plánták' szárított Gyüjteménye. Collectio plantarum siccatum Hungariae (1823–1830) and Agrostotheca Hungarica (1836–1841). The plant species Potentilla sadleri and Ferula sadleriana and the genus Sadleria were named after him.
