= József Dorner =

Hungarian educator and botanist (1808–1873)

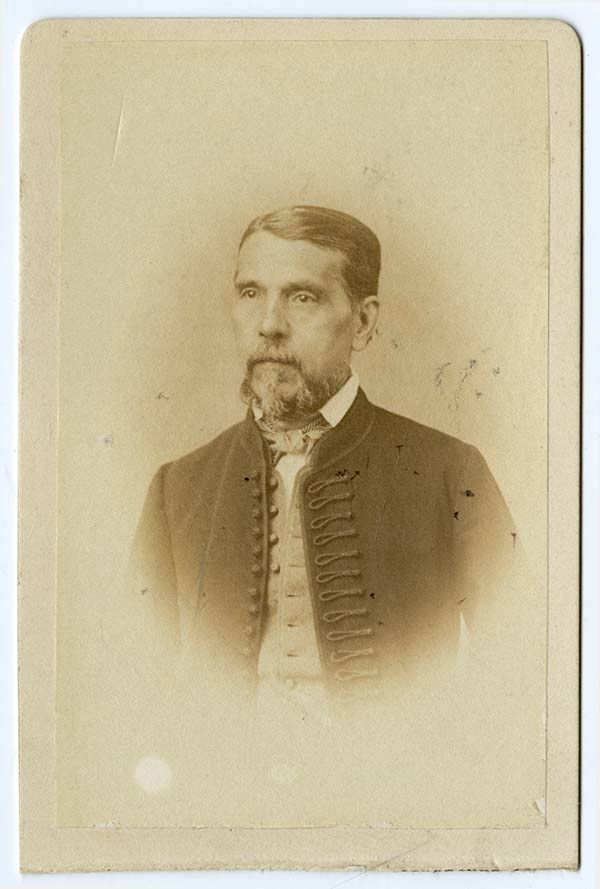
- Portrait of Dorner, 1865.
- Born: József Thurner junior 2 November 1808; Győr
- Died: 9 October 1873 (aged 64) (Note: Vozárová gives his date of death as the 3rd of October, while other sources such as Grundl state it was on the 9th of the month.); Pest, Hungary
- Resting place: Fiume Road Graveyard
- Other names: Dorner József, I. Dorner, Josef Dorner, Joseph von Dorner, Joseph von Dörner, Josef von Dorner, Thurner József.
- Scientific career
- Fields: Botany, chemistry, histology

József Dorner (2 November 1808 – 9 October 1873), was a Hungarian educator and botanist.

He was born József Thurner the Younger, was born to German parents József Thurner the Elder, a merchant, and Zsuzsanna Schmidt. A pharmacist by trade, he also worked as a schoolteacher and is best known today as a botanist.

By 1831, or 1834, he had changed his family name to Dorner at the time of his registration as a nobleman. This spelling is also his botanical author abbreviation Dorner. According to Szmodits, he married in 1845 but they remained childless, with his wife predeceasing him.

== Education, careers in pharmacy and teaching ==
Initially, Dorner went to school in his hometown of Győr, up to lower secondary school. He completed his secondary education in Sopron, and from 1824 to 1827 he undertook further training as an apprentice at the Kochmeister-run Magyar Korona (Hungarian Crown) pharmacy in Sopron, before passing his examinations and receiving an assistantship. With this qualification, he worked as a pharmacy attendant in Pest and Bratislava. Dorner then enrolled at the University of Vienna and the Polytechnic Institute (now TU Vienna) to study pharmacy, including subjects in botany and chemistry, which he completed in 1832.

From 1836 to 1840, he ran a pharmacy in Bratislava called the Arany Korona (Golden Crown), that had been purchased for him by his father. However, he sold the business soon after, and went to take a position in the health department of the Lieutenancy Council in Buda. In 1848, Baron József Eötvös, the minister of religion and public education, offered him a teaching role, which he accepted. By 1853, he had become a professor of natural history at the Lutheran lyceum in Szarvas, and from 1860 until his death, he was a professor at the Pest Evangelical upper-grammar school (Obergymnasium). He also taught at Deák Téri Evangélikus Gimnázium in Budapest. Alongside his specialty of the natural sciences, he also taught German and French.

== Botanical work ==
In the 1830s, Dorner came into contact with other botanists, and in 1835 went on a botanical expedition with János Heuffel and Anton Rochel to the Banat. After the Hungarian Revolution of 1848, he retired from government work and instead pursued botanical studies.

Although Dorner intended to compose a Flora of Hungary with his botanical colleagues József Sadler and János Heuffel, the plans never came to fruition after the death of Sadler in 1849, and the retirement of Heuffel due to ill health. Instead, he wrote smaller monographic works and papers in Hungarian and foreign journals. By 1858, Dorner became a corresponding member of the Hungarian Academy of Sciences and subsequently published 167 articles in the academy's Bulletin. He was also a member of the Imperial-Royal Zoological-Botanical Society (Kaiserlich-königliche zoologisch-botanische Gesellschaft, the predecessor of the Zoological-Botanical Society in Austria).

He was particularly interested in plant anatomy and plant physiology, and in turn, was a skilled microscopist. Dorner also shared his research on the development of cells with German scientists. At the same time, through these professional networks, Dorner was aware of wider innovations in science, including the theory of biological evolution developed by Charles Darwin, and the botanical research of Asa Gray.

The majority of Dorner's botanical specimens were collected within the present-day territory of Hungary, but are now found in herbaria worldwide. This includes the Meise Botanic Garden herbarium, the National Museum of Natural History, France, Kew Herbarium, Universalmuseum Joanneum, and the National Herbarium of Victoria, Royal Botanic Gardens Victoria.

He also named the following species:

- Carex trachyantha Dorner (a synonym of Carex depressa subsp. transsilvanica).
- Quercus cerris var. macrophylla Dorner (a synonym of Quercus cerris).

== Death and burial ==
After a long illness Dorner passed away in October 1873, and was subsequently buried in Plot 9, Row 4, Grave 70 of the Fiume Road Graveyard in Budapest. Before 2007, his grave was marked with a timber gabled cross but it has since been replaced with a stone obelisk.

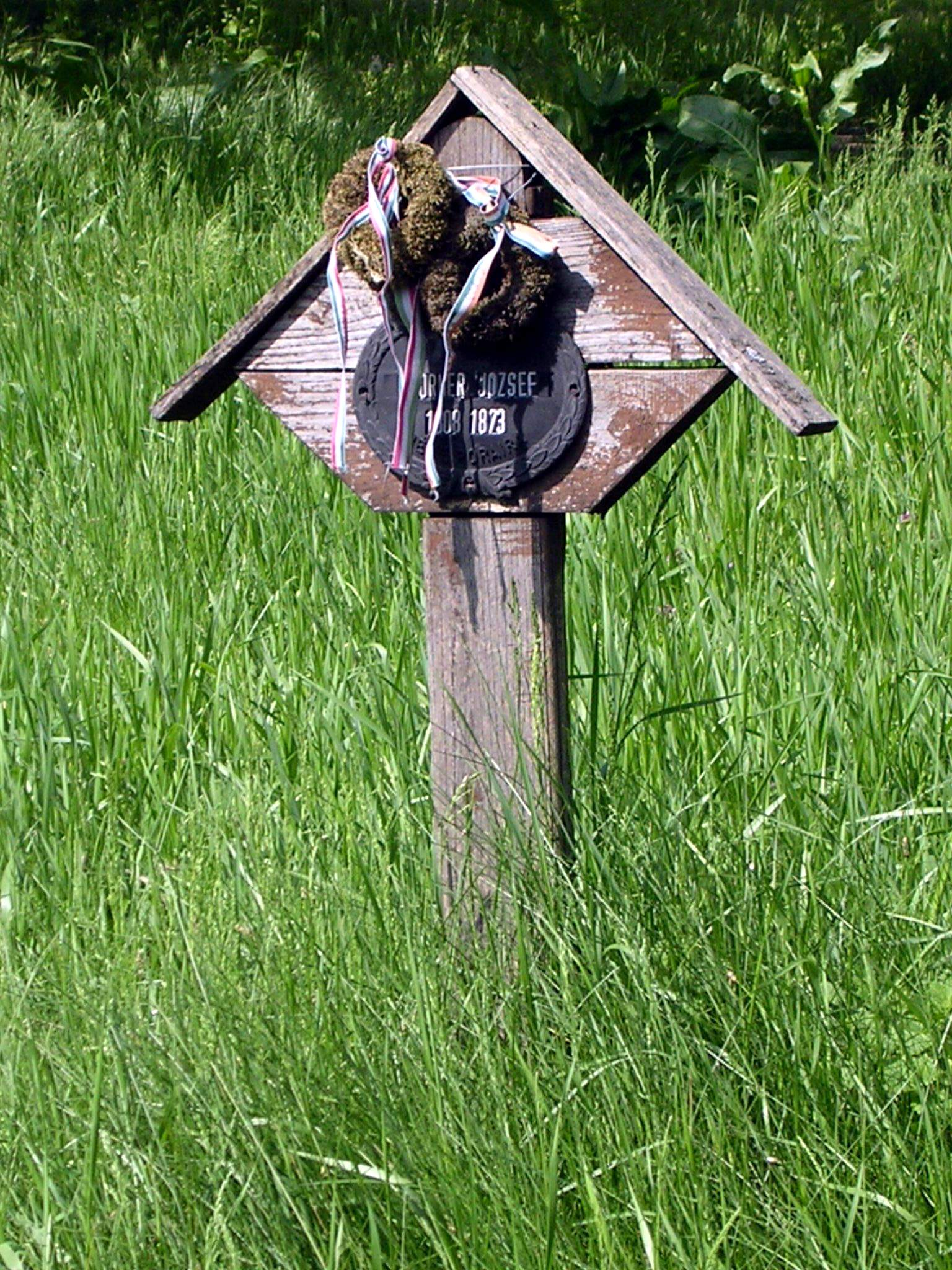
Pre-2007 timber grave marker in the Fiume Road Graveyard.

== Major publications ==
- von Dorner, Joseph. 1839. Das Banat in topographisch-naturhistorischer Beziehung, mit besonderer Berücksichtigung der Herculesbäder nächst Mehadia und ihrer Umgebungen. Nebst einer ausführlichen Schilderung der Reise in die Bäder mit den Dampfschiffen und zu Lande, und einer Beschreibung der an den banatischen Donauufern vorkommenden Alterthümer. (The Banat in its topographical and natural-historical aspects, with special consideration of the Baths of Hercules near Mehadia and their surroundings. Including a detailed account of the journey to the baths by steamboat and by land, and a description of the antiquities found on the banks of the Banatian Danube.) Pressburg (Bratislava).
- von Dorner, Joseph. 1839. Mehadia und die Hercules-Bäder im Cserna-Thale im walachysch-illyrischen Gränzgebiete Königreich Ungarn (Mehadia and the Baths of Hercules in the Cerna Valley, in the Wallachian-Illyrian border region of the Kingdom of Hungary), in Panorama der Oesterreichischen Monarchie oder malerisch-romantisches Denkbuch.
- Dorner, Joseph. 1841. Das Ganze der Essigfabrikation theoretisch und praktisch abgehandelt, oder vollständiger Unterricht, wie der Essig aus den verschiedenartigsten Substanzen mit grösstmöglichem Vortheile sowohl im Kleinen für den Hausbedarf erzeugt, als auch im fabrikmässigen Betrieb genommen werden kann. Mit ausführlicher Beschreibung der neuen Schnell-Essigfabrikations-Methoden nach einem wesentlich abgeäderten Verfahren, nebst einer Anweisung zur Bereitung der verschiedenen Tafel- und aromatischen Essige und zum Einmachen der Früchte. Mit Abbildungen. (The entire process, both theoretically and practically, of vinegar production; or a complete instruction on how vinegar can be produced from the most diverse substances with the greatest possible advantage, both on a small scale for household use and on an industrial scale. Includes a detailed description of new, rapid methods of vinegar-making from a significantly modified procedure, along with instructions for preparing various table and aromatic vinegars and for preserving fruit. With illustrations.)
- Dorner, Joseph. 1843. Der vollständige Betrieb der Branntweinbrennerei nach allen seinen Verzweigungen mit ausführlicher Beschreibung der Malz- und Hefenbereitung, des Maischverfahrens, sowie des gesammten Destillationsprozesses nach den neuesten Erfahrungen und bewährtesten Methoden; enthaltend eine vollständige Belehrung, wie der Ertrag der Getreidekörner und Kartoffeln aufs Höchste gesteigert und der Gehalt, sowie der Werth der Waare unter allen Umständen mit Sicherheit ausgemittelt werden könne. Mit 21 Abbildgen. (The complete operation of a spirit distillery in all of its aspects, with a detailed description of malt and yeast preparation, the mashing procedure, and the entire distillation process according to the latest experience and most best methods; including complete instructions on how to maximize the yield of grain seeds and potatoes, and how to determine the content and value of the product under all circumstances and with certainty. With 21 illustrations.)
- Dorner, Joseph. 1853. Die Traubenkrankheit nach den neuesten Erfahrungen und Ergebnissen. (The grape disease, presented according to the newest research and findings.)
- Az ásványtan elemei algymnasiumok és alreáliskolák számára, Pest, 1858
- Az állattan elemei a gymnasium és ipartanoda alsóbb osztályai számára I–III., Pest, 1863–1864
- A növénytan elemei a gymnasium és ipartanoda alsóbb osztályai számára, Pest, 1864
- Dorner József. 1865. Ásványtan felsőbb tanodák számára (Mineralogy for high school students).
- von Dorner, Josef. 1867–1868. Die cuscuteen der ungarischen Flora (The dodders/Cuscuta of the Hungarian flora).
