= László Menyhárth =

Hungarian missionary and botanist (1849–1897)

László Menyhárth (30 May 1849 – 16 November 1897 in Boroma, South Africa) was a Hungarian missionary and botanical collector.

He studied theology and philosophy in Innsbruck, later serving as a gymnasium teacher in Kalocsa. Here he conducted investigations of the local flora. From around 1890, he worked as a missionary in southern Africa, from where he also performed meteorological observations and collected botanical specimens. Plants collected in Africa were sent to Swiss botanist Hans Schinz for further examination.

== Published works ==
- Kolocsa vidékének növénytenyészete, 1877 – Botany of the Kolocsa environs.
- Meteorologische Beobachtungen, angestellt zu Boroma in Süd-Afrika im Jahre 1891 und 1892 (with Julius Fényi), 1896 – Meteorological observations, from Boroma, South Africa 1891/1892.
- Meteorologische Beobachtungen zu Boroma und Zumbo in Südafrika in den Jahren 1893–1897 (with Julius Fényi), 1905 – Meteorological observations, from Boroma and Zumbo, South Africa 1893–97.
- Plantae Menyharthianae : ein Beitrag zur Kenntnis der Flora des unteren Sambesi (with Hans Schinz), 1905 – "Plantae Menyhartianae", a contribution to the knowledge of flora of the lower Zambezi area.
