= Anton Waisbecker =

Hungarian botanist (1835-1916)

Anton (Antal) Waisbecker (29 January 1835 in Güns in Eisenburg comitatus – 4 April 1916) was a Hungarian physician and botanist.

He served as a district physician in the city of Güns and conducted investigations of local flora. Known for his expertise in the study of Pteridophyta, he also made significant contributions involving research within the genera Rubus, Carex and Potentilla.

== Published works ==
- Köszeg és vidékének edényes nôvényei (1882, second edition in 1891) - Phanerogams of Köszeg and vicinity.
- Beiträge zur Flora des Eisenburger Comitates 1891 - Contribution to the flora of Eisenburg county.
- Ueber die Büschelhaare der Potentillen. 1892
- Carex Fritschii n. sp. 1894
- Ueber die Variationen einiger Carex Arten. 1897
- Bemerkungen über Asplenium Forsteri Sadl. 1898
- Beiträge zur Kenntnis der Gattung Odontites. 1899
- Neue Beiträge zur Flora des Eisenburger Comitats in West-Ungarn. 1903
- Neue Beiträge zur Flora des Comitats Vas in Westungarn. 1905
