= Szaniszló Priszter =

Hungarian botanist

Szaniszló Priszter (1917–2011) was a Hungarian botanist.

== Publications ==
- Móró, mária anna; szaniszló Priszter, lászló gy. Szabó. Plantae Asiaticae Rariores

=== Books ===
- vera Csapody, szaniszló Priszter. 1966. Magyar növénynevek szótára (növenynevek diccionario húngaro). Ed. Budapest, Mezógazdasági Kiadó. 301 pp.
- 1975. Iconographia florae partis austro-orientalis Europae centralis = Iconography of the flora from the south-eastern part of central Europe / Jávorka--Csapody. Ed. Budapest : Adadémiai Kiadó. xl + 576 pp. ISBN 963-05-0502-9. 2ª ed. 1991
- 1979. A magyar flóra képekben. Stuttgart: S. Fischer [Germany], 1979. 703, 79 pp. il.
- Prisztler, szaniszló; attila l. Borhidi. 1983. Arbores fruticesque europae : vocabularium octo linguis redactum / composuit Szaniszló Priszter; operis socii Attila Borhidi ... [et al.]. 300 pp. ISBN 963-05-2946-7
- 1986. Növényneveink, magyar-latin szógyűjtemény (Növényneveink vocabulario húngaro-américano). Mezőgazdasági Kiadó, Budapest. 191 pp. ISBN 963-232-211-8
- zoltan Kadar, szaniszlo Priszter. 1992. Az elovilag Megismeresenek Kezdetei Hazankban: A Magyar Biologia Rovid Kulturtortenete a Kezdetektol a Reformkorig ( -1829) (Comienza la exploración de la vida silvestre en Hungría: el húngaro Asimov Cultural desde el principio de la Reforma). Ed. Akadémiai Kiadó. ISBN 963-05-6372-X
- Vörös, éva: priszter Szaniszló. 1997. Márton József természethistóriai képeskönyvének növénynevei (historia natural de Márton József). 69 pp. ISBN 963-472-086-2
