= Sándor Jávorka =

Sándor Jávorka (12 March 1883 - 28 September 1961) was a Hungarian botanist. His birthplace was Hegybánya, then in the Kingdom of Hungary, now in Slovakia and now called Štiavnické Bane. He died in Budapest. Occasionally he has been referred to as Alexander Jávorka; the Hungarian style of his name is Jávorka Sándor.

== Life and work ==
After attending school in Selmecbánya (now called Banská Štiavnica), Sándor Jávorka studied at the University of Budapest and graduated in 1906 with a thesis on the genus Onosma. Since 1905 he was employed in the Department of Botany of the Hungarian National Museum, where he worked until 1940, latterly as its director. Even after retirement, he remained there still active. In 1939 he became a professor at the University of Budapest. In 1936 he became a corresponding member of the Hungarian Academy of Sciences, and seven years later a permanent member. In 1952 he was awarded the Kossuth Prize.

The focus of Jávorka's scientific work was plant taxonomy and the Flora of Hungary, Bulgaria, Yugoslavia and Albania. From 1903, he published over 220 works, including 18 books. His main works include the Flora Hungarica (1924–25) and the complementary illustrated version Iconographia Florae Partis Austro-Orientalis Europae Centralis (1929 to 1934, with co-author Vera Csapody), besides several identification books and a biography of the Hungarian botanist Pál Kitaibel.

== Book translated into English ==
- Sándor Jávorka, Vera Csapody (1975). Iconography of the flora from the south-eastern part of central Europe. Budapest: Akadémia. pp. 73 + xl + 576.
