= Oravița =

- Town
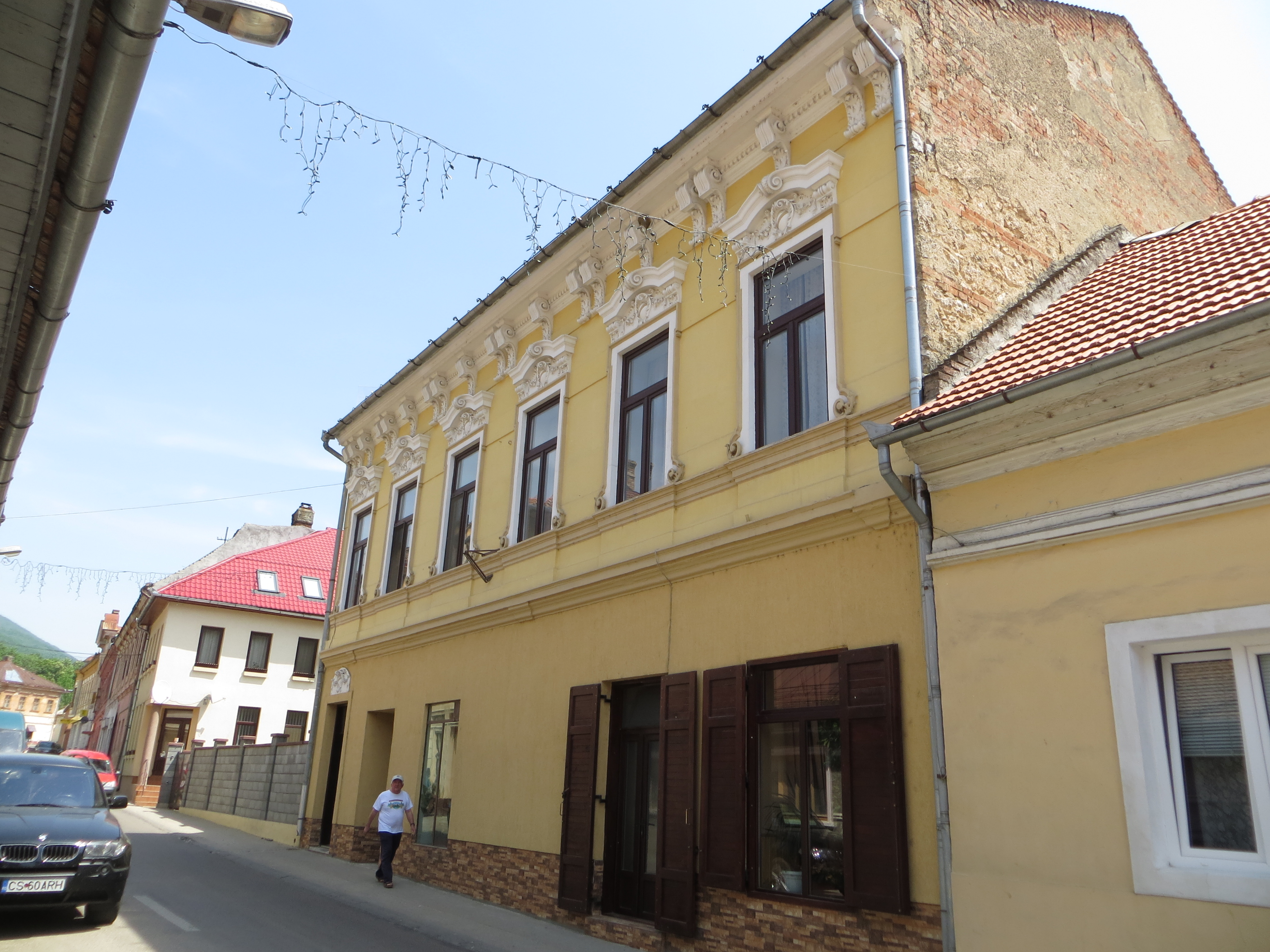

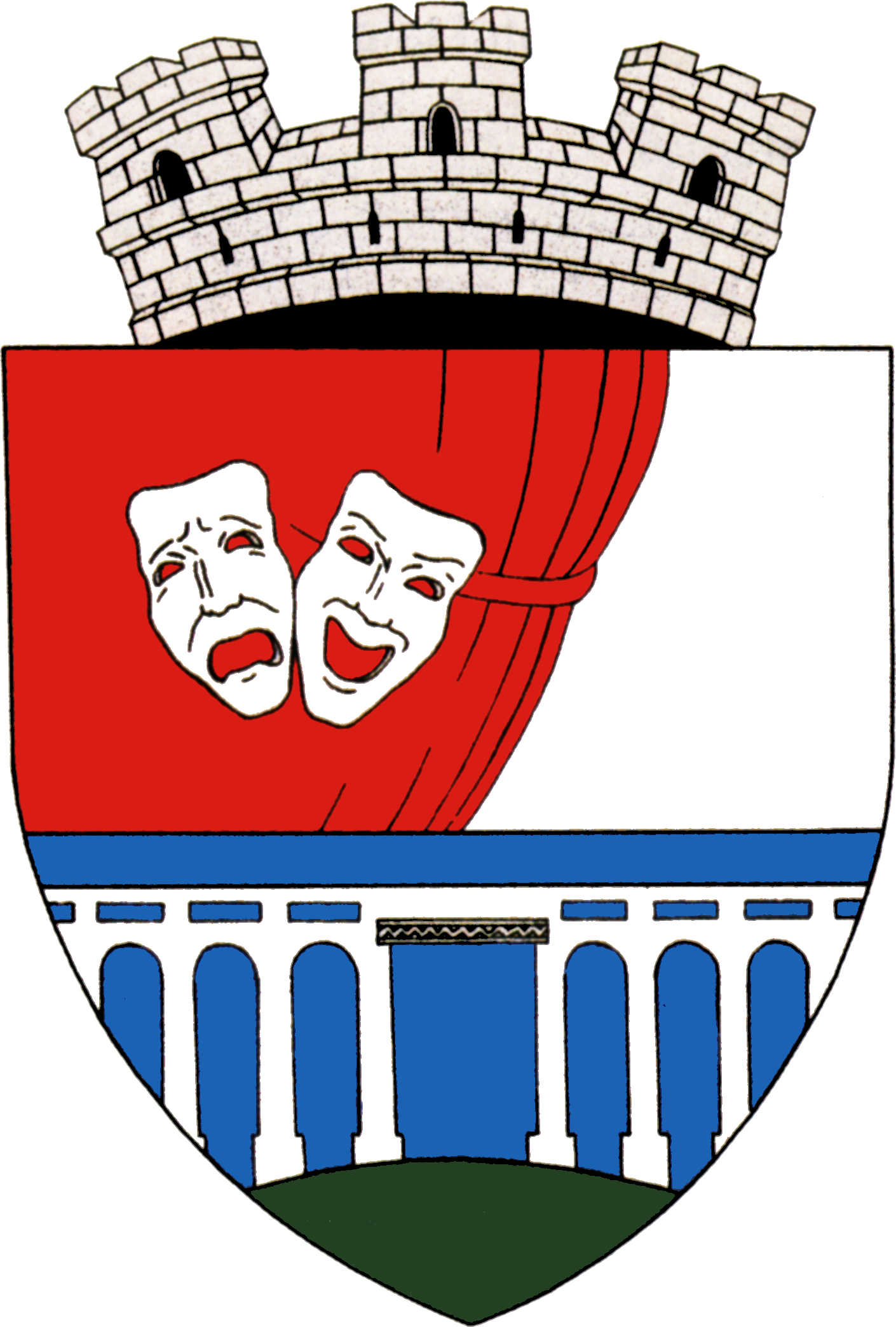
- Coat of arms

- Location in Caraș-Severin County

- Location in Romania
- Coordinates: 45°2′25″N 21°41′7″E
- Country: Romania
- County: Caraș-Severin

Government
  - Mayor (2024–2028): Dumitru Ursu (PSD)
- Area: 162.64 km^{2} (62.80 sq mi)
- Elevation: 253 m (830 ft)
- Population (2021-12-01): 9,346
  - Density: 57.46/km^{2} (148.8/sq mi)
- Time zone: UTC+02:00 (EET)
  - Summer (DST): UTC+03:00 (EEST)
- Postal code: 325600
- Area code: +(40) 0255
- Vehicle reg.: CS
- Website: oravita.ro

Oravița (Romanian pronunciation: [oˈravit͡sa]; Hungarian: Oravicabánya; German: Orawitz; Czech: Oravice; Serbo-Croatian: Oravica/Оравица) is a town in the Banat region of Romania, in Caraș-Severin County, with a population of 9,346 in 2021. Its theater is a fully functional scaled down version of the old Burgtheater in Vienna.

Six villages are administered by the town: Agadici (Agadics; Agaditsch), Brădișoru de Jos (until 1960 Maidan; Majdán), Broșteni (Brostyán), Ciclova Montană (Csiklóbánya; Montan-Tschiklowa), Marila (Marillavölgy; Marillathal), and Răchitova (Rakitova).

== Etymology ==
The name of the town is derived from the Slavic word orah(ov), meaning "(of) walnut" with suffix -ița.

== Villages ==
=== Agadici ===
The history of Agadici can be traced back to at least the 17th century, when records noted a population of "800 souls". Today, there are fewer than 200 people living in Agadici. Agadici is a word derived from Turkish: Aga meaning 'colonel' and dici meaning 'daughter'. Therefore, Agadici means "daughter of the colonel". The town was supposedly named after a colonel's daughter when the Ottoman Empire occupied the land that is now the Banat (see the Temeşvar Eyalet).

=== Ciclova Montană ===
The second-oldest beer in what is now Romania was produced in Ciclova; it is first attested in a document of 1728. In the beginning, production was under the management and patronage of the local Catholic monastery. Known as "bere Ciclova" in later years, the firm went bankrupt in 1996.

== Natives ==
- Florin Bătrânu (born 1971), footballer
- Cristian Boldea (born 1985), footballer
- Radu Pavel Gheo (born 1969), fiction writer and essayist
- Adolf Humborg (1847–1921), Austrian painter
- Kálmán Kerpely (1864–1940), Hungarian agronomist
- András Lévai (1908–2003), Hungarian engineer and academic
- Simeon Mangiuca (1831–1890), folklorist
- Kálmán Mihalik (1896–1922), Hungarian physician and composer
- Ena Rottenberg (1893–1952), Hungarian-Austrian craftswoman, draftswoman, and ceramist

== Climate ==
Oravița has a humid continental climate (Cfb in the Köppen climate classification) with strong Mediterranean influences, characterized by mild winters and high overnight temperatures. The town is protected from cold winds due to its location between the Oravița Hills and the Anina Mountains, which increases its exposure to solar radiation.

Because of these geographic factors, Oravița has recorded several national meteorological anomalies. It is one of the few low-altitude stations in Romania where the temperature has never fallen below −25 °C (−13 °F); its absolute minimum is −22.7 °C (−8.9 °F), recorded in January 1963. Conversely, the town held the national January maximum record for 22 years after reaching +22.2 °C (+72.0 °F) in 2001.

Summers feature high temperatures, and Oravița retains the national absolute maximum record for the month of June at +42.0 °C (+107.6 °F), established in 1938. The local topography frequently traps overnight heat, making the town unique in Romania for registering tropical nights as early as March and as late as October.

This microclimate was observed during a heatwave in July 2024. The town surpassed its own 24-year-old national record for the highest daily minimum temperature in Romanian history on consecutive days. On July 17, 2024, the overnight minimum temperature reached 29.8 °C (85.6 °F), which is approximately 13 °C (23.4 °F) above the seasonal average.

Climate data for Oravița (elevation 309m, 2014–2026 normals, extremes 1955–present)
Month	Jan	Feb	Mar	Apr	May	Jun	Jul	Aug	Sep	Oct	Nov	Dec	Year
Record high °C (°F)	22.2 (72.0)	23.3 (73.9)	27.5 (81.5)	28.7 (83.7)	32.4 (90.3)	42.0 (107.6)	41.8 (107.2)	40.6 (105.1)	37.7 (99.9)	30.6 (87.1)	26.4 (79.5)	20.7 (69.3)	42.0 (107.6)
Mean daily maximum °C (°F)	5.1 (41.2)	8.8 (47.8)	12.8 (55.0)	17.4 (63.3)	21.7 (71.1)	27.1 (80.8)	29.4 (84.9)	29.5 (85.1)	24.4 (75.9)	17.9 (64.2)	12.0 (53.6)	7.0 (44.6)	17.8 (64.0)
Daily mean °C (°F)	1.9 (35.4)	5.1 (41.2)	8.5 (47.3)	12.5 (54.5)	16.7 (62.1)	21.6 (70.9)	23.7 (74.7)	23.9 (75.0)	19.5 (67.1)	13.7 (56.7)	8.5 (47.3)	4.1 (39.4)	13.3 (56.0)
Mean daily minimum °C (°F)	−1.3 (29.7)	1.4 (34.5)	4.2 (39.6)	7.6 (45.7)	11.6 (52.9)	16.1 (61.0)	17.9 (64.2)	18.3 (64.9)	14.6 (58.3)	9.5 (49.1)	5.1 (41.2)	1.2 (34.2)	8.9 (47.9)
Record low °C (°F)	−22.7 (−8.9)	−21.0 (−5.8)	−15.3 (4.5)	−6.4 (20.5)	−0.4 (31.3)	5.1 (41.2)	6.4 (43.5)	7.0 (44.6)	0.6 (33.1)	−5.5 (22.1)	−10.9 (12.4)	−16.9 (1.6)	−22.7 (−8.9)
Average precipitation mm (inches)	64.3 (2.53)	47.2 (1.86)	51.7 (2.04)	65.3 (2.57)	102.8 (4.05)	83.9 (3.30)	103.2 (4.06)	70.9 (2.79)	68.5 (2.70)	57.9 (2.28)	68.6 (2.70)	54.2 (2.13)	838.5 (33.01)
Average precipitation days (≥ 1.0 mm)	10.8	6.8	7.3	8.7	11.1	8.2	7.1	6.4	7.2	7.2	9.9	8.3	99
Average snowy days	10.2	4.6	2.4	1.2	0	0	0	0	0	0	2.2	4.8	25.4
Source 1: Meteomanz (2014-2026); Infoclimat (1980-2010);
Source 2: Stația Meteorologică Oravița (1955-2012)

== Anina–Oravița railway ==
The rail line from Anina to Oravița was the first mountain railway in Hungary and today's Romania. Opened in 1863, it is still in use today for touristic purposes, and is sometimes considered one of the most beautiful railways in Europe due to its landscapes, viaducts, and long tunnels.

Historical population
Year	Pop.	±%
1930	9,585	—
1948	6,974	−27.2%
1956	8,175	+17.2%
1966	9,912	+21.2%
1977	14,987	+51.2%
1992	15,293	+2.0%
2002	15,222	−0.5%
2011	10,225	−32.8%
2021	9,346	−8.6%
Source: Census data

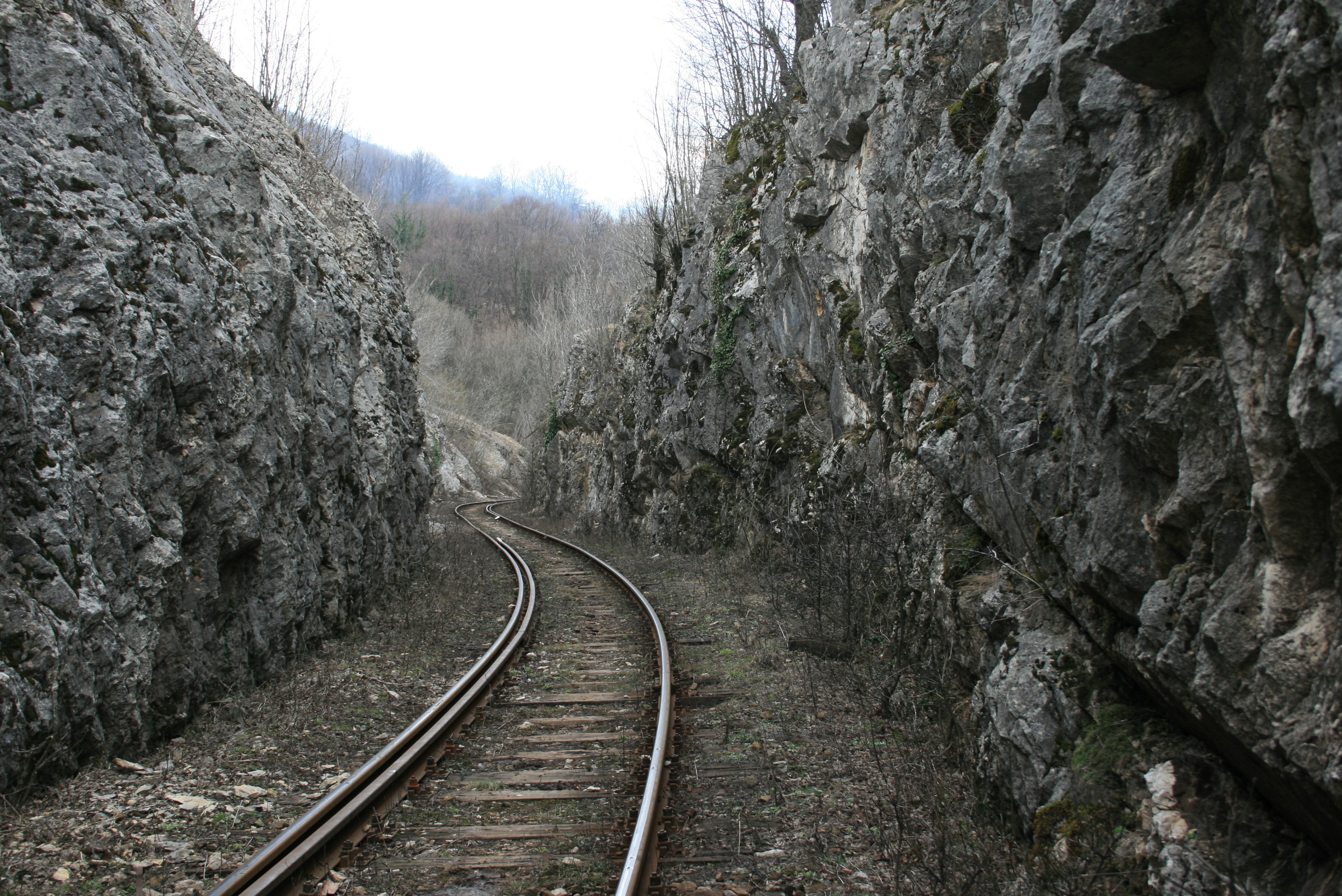
View from the Oravița–Anina mountain railway in 2010

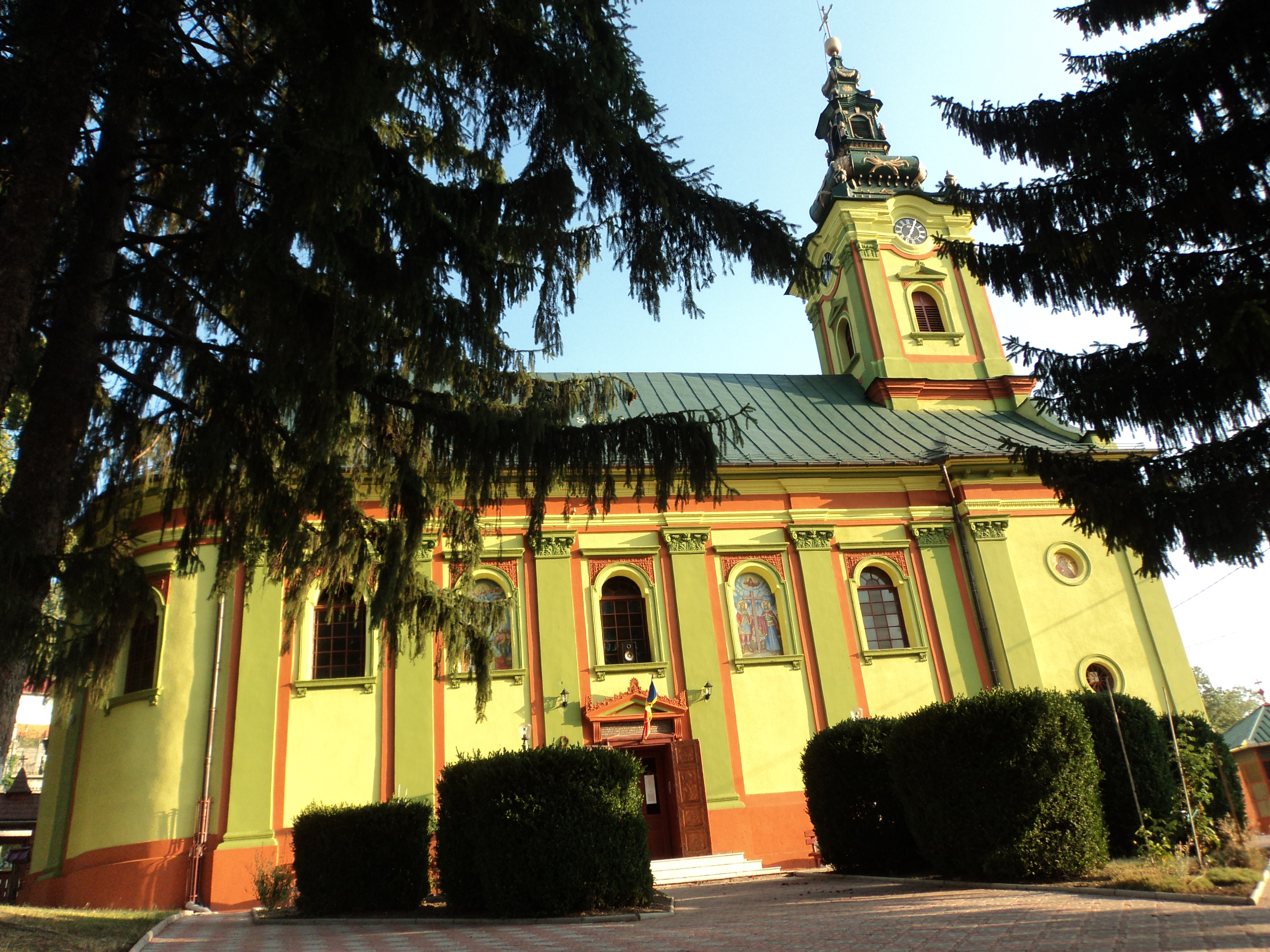
Church of the Assumption, Oravița (1781–1784)
