= Árpád Paál =

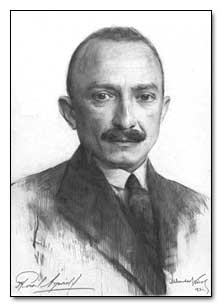

Árpád Paál (15 April 1889 – 9 April 1943) was a Hungarian botanist and plant physiologist who was among the first to experimentally demonstrate the existence of auxins. He taught at the University of Budapest where he established a plant physiology institute.

== Life and work ==
Paál was born in Budapest to Árpád and Anna Dávid. He received a doctorate in the humanities from the University of Budapest (1911) and then travelled through Europe. From 1915 he worked at the botany and pathology station under the ministry of agriculture. In 1918 he became a private lecturer at Budapest University. He became an assistant professor in 1922 and headed the botany department from 1929 when he succeeded Sándor Mágócsy-Dietz. He studied plant growth and the response to stimuli. He conducted experiments on the bending of the growing apex of plants towards light. In 1919 he conducted experiments to show that the coleoptile of Avena when cut and placed on gelatin bends towards light as demonstrated earlier by Boysen-Jensen. He however took it further by taking the dark-grown coleoptile and placed it on either side of the base of the cut growing stem and was able to show that some substance in it caused the bending to either side without the need for the light stimulus. This substance was able to pass even through a layer of gelatin. This was later retested by Fritz Went who came up with the word auxin in 1928 for the plant growth hormone. He established the Hungarian plant physiology institute and was a member of the board of the Hungarian Natural History Society.

Paál died from coronary atherosclerosis and was survived by his wife Mária Jozefa Solt. His students included Otto Orsós (1911-1939) who pioneered plant tissue culture.
