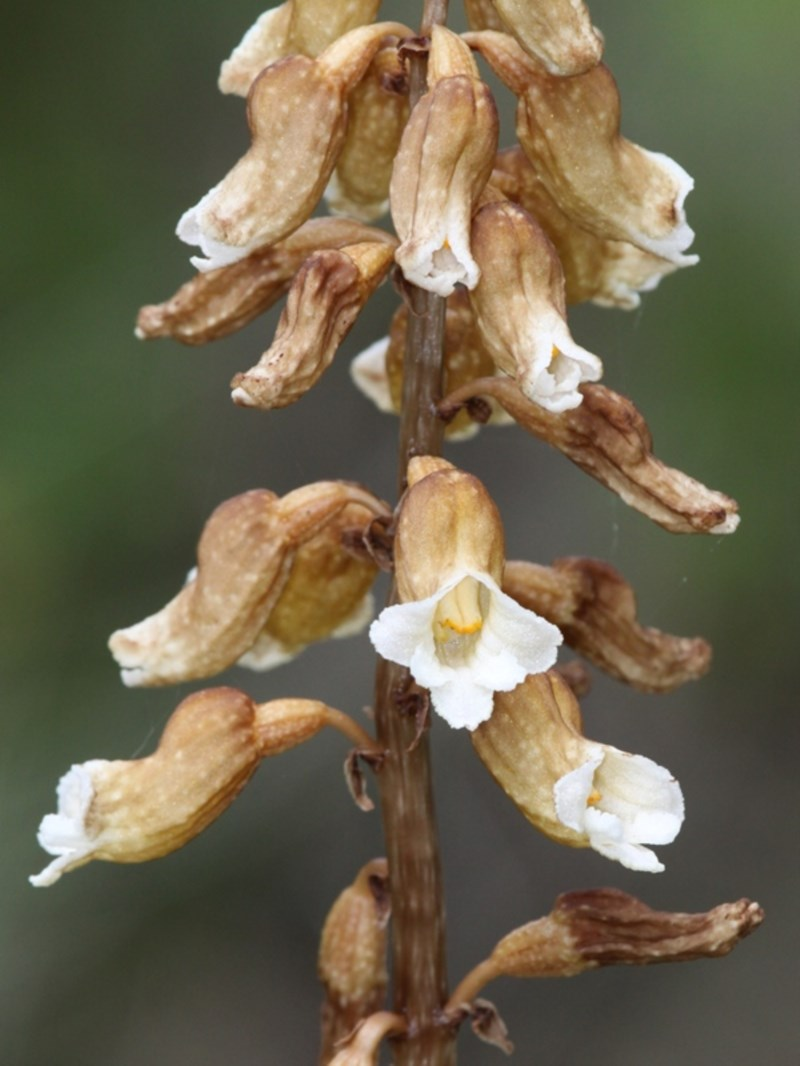
- In the Namadgi National Park

Scientific classification
- Kingdom: Plantae
- Clade: Tracheophytes
- Clade: Angiosperms
- Clade: Monocots
- Order: Asparagales
- Family: Orchidaceae
- Subfamily: Epidendroideae
- Tribe: Gastrodieae
- Genus: Gastrodia
- Species: G. entomogama

Binomial name
- Gastrodia entomogama D.L.Jones

= Gastrodia entomogama =

Brindabella potato orchid

Species of orchid

Gastrodia entomogama, previously known as Brindabella potato orchid, is now accepted as a synonym of Gastrodia procera, by Plants of the World Online, the Australian Plant Census and the Royal Botanic Garden, Sydney.
