= Gastrodia spatulata =

Scientific classification
- Kingdom: Plantae
- Clade: Tracheophytes
- Clade: Angiosperms
- Clade: Monocots
- Order: Asparagales
- Family: Orchidaceae
- Subfamily: Epidendroideae
- Tribe: Gastrodieae
- Genus: Gastrodia
- Species: G. spatulata

Binomial name
- Gastrodia spatulata (Carr) J.J. Wood

Synonyms
- Neoclemensia spathulata Carr

Species of orchid

Gastrodia spatulata is a species of Gastrodia native to Indonesia and Malaysia. It is known from Borneo and Java.

== Taxonomy ==
It was first described by Cedric Errol Carr in 1935, from a dried specimen collected in the Penibukan range in Malaysia's Sabah state in 1933, as belonging to a new monotypic genus, and named Neoclemensia spathulata, on the basis of details of the morphology of the flower -it has a shield-shaped stigma on top of a raised protuberance at the base of the column, as opposed to an oblong or broadly V-shaped stigma above the base of the column in the rest of Gastrodia known at the time.

In 2011 Jeffrey James Wood and colleagues, having found it growing on Mount Kinabalu in Sabah, subsumed it into the genus Gastrodia, apparently misspelling the specific epithet as "spatulata" as opposed to "spathulata". This mistake has been rectified by subsequent authors.

== Description ==
It is morphologically similar to Gastrodia gunatillekeorum, which was discovered in Sri Lanka in 2020.

== Distribution ==
Because, aside from a short flowering time, the species of Gastrodia remain underground throughout their lives, they are extremely cryptic plants and easily overlooked. In 2011 Wood et al. believed the species to be endemic to Mount Kinabalu. The species was first discovered to grow in Indonesia in 2018, when Kenji Suetsugu and colleagues were checking the dried voucher specimens of Gastrodia in the Herbarium Bogoriense, and discovered that one of the specimens of G. javanica which had been collected in western Java was misidentified, and in fact belonged to this species.
