= Gastrodia zeylanica =

Scientific classification
- Kingdom: Plantae
- Clade: Tracheophytes
- Clade: Angiosperms
- Clade: Monocots
- Order: Asparagales
- Family: Orchidaceae
- Subfamily: Epidendroideae
- Tribe: Gastrodieae
- Genus: Gastrodia
- Species: G. zeylanica

Binomial name
- Gastrodia zeylanica Schltr 1906

Synonyms
- Demorchis zeylanica (Schltr.) M. A. Clem.; D. L. Jones 2019

Species of orchid

Gastrodia zeylanica is a species of potato orchids which is endemic to Sri Lanka. It was added to the 2007 Red list of Threatened Fauna and Flora of Sri Lanka as 'critically endangered', on the basis of it having only been collected from a few localities.

== Taxonomy ==
It was first reported from Sri Lanka in 1864 by George Henry Kendrick Thwaites, who classified it as Gastrodia javanica, this was followed by subsequent authors until 1906, when Rudolf Schlechter described the Sri Lankan specimens as a new species which he called G. zeylanica.

In 2019 it was synonymized as Demorchis zeylanica (Demorchis is a synonym of Gastrodia), by Mark Alwin Clements and David Lloyd Jones.

== Distribution ==
It is native to southwest Sri Lanka.

In the 1981 A Revised handbook to the flora of Ceylon, Jayaweera mistakenly included illustrations of a Didymoplexis, possibly D. pallens, titled as Gastrodia zeylanica, and based on these illustrations Khan and Halam identified G. zeylanica as occurring in Bangladesh in 1989. This belief was maintained in Our present knowledge on the Terrestrial Orchidaceae by Khanam et al. Jayaweera's mistake was first pointed out by Fernando and Ormerod in their 2008 publication An Annotated Checklist of the Orchids of Sri Lanka.
