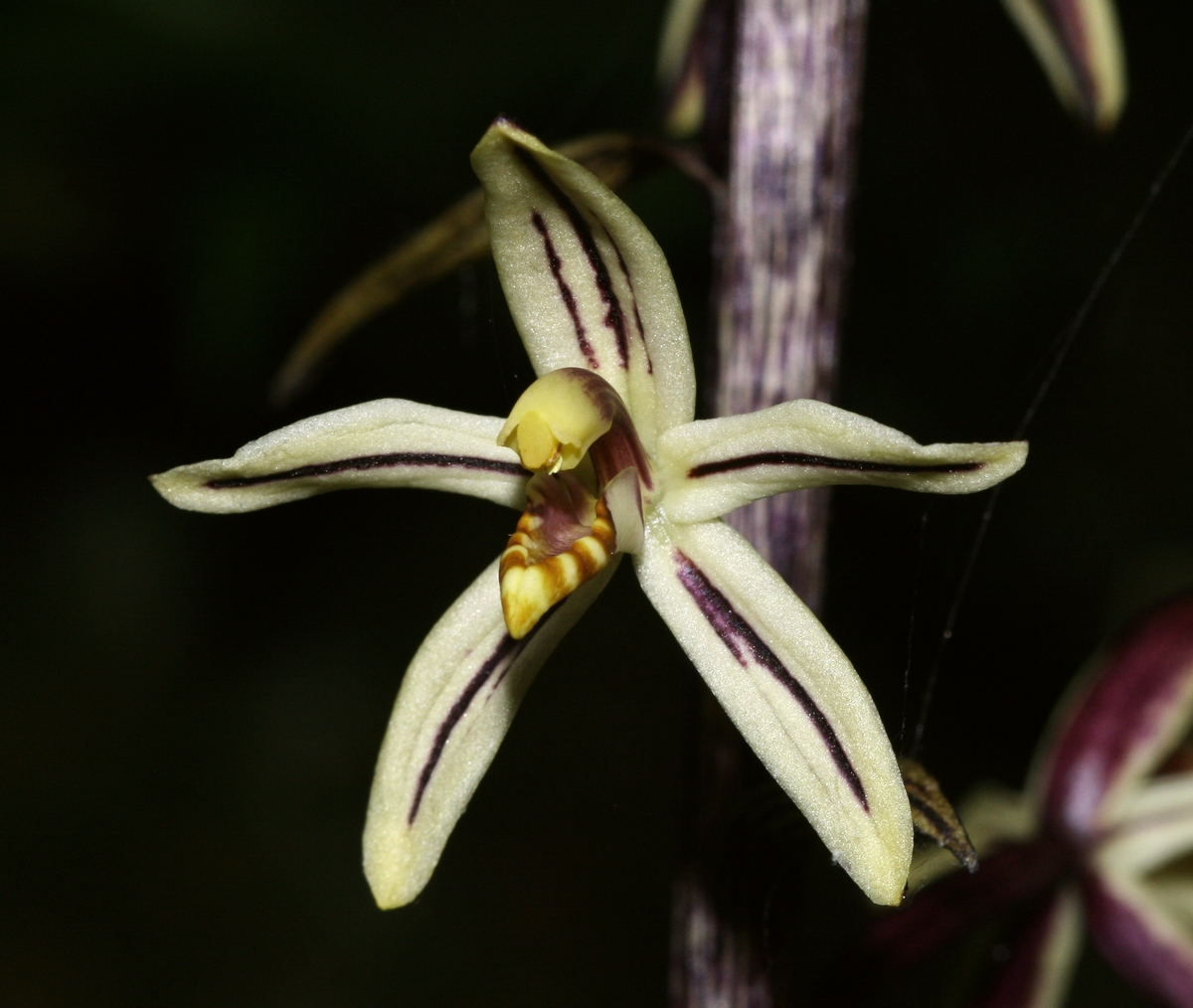
- Aphyllorchis montana in the Gunung Leuser National Park

Scientific classification
- Kingdom: Plantae
- Clade: Embryophytes
- Clade: Tracheophytes
- Clade: Spermatophytes
- Clade: Angiosperms
- Clade: Monocots
- Order: Asparagales
- Family: Orchidaceae
- Subfamily: Epidendroideae
- Tribe: Neottieae
- Genus: Aphyllorchis; Blume

Type species
- Aphyllorchis pallida Blume

Synonyms
- Sinorchis S.C.Chen

= Aphyllorchis =

Pauper orchids

Genus of flowering plants

Aphyllorchis, commonly known as pauper orchids or as 無葉蘭屬/无叶兰属 (wu ye lan shu), is a genus of about twenty species of terrestrial leafless orchids in the family Orchidaceae. Orchids in this genus have fleshy, upright stems and small to medium-sized resupinate flowers with narrow sepals and petals. They are native to a region extending from India east to China and Japan, south to Indonesia, New Guinea and Queensland, Australia.

== Description ==
Orchids in the genus Aphyllorchis are leafless, terrestrial, mycotrophic herbs. A few to many flowers are borne on an erect, usually fleshy, unbranched flowering stem. The flowers are resupinate, more or less cup-shaped with the sepals and petals free from each other and similar in length but with the dorsal sepal curving forwards. The labellum is larger than the sepals and petals, boat-shaped and divided into two main sections, an upper "epichile" and lower "hypochile". The epichile is attached to the base of the column and the hypochile often with two lobes and turned downwards.

== Taxonomy and naming ==
The genus Aphyllorchis was first formally described in 1825 by Carl Ludwig Blume and the description was published in his book Tabellen en Platen voor de Javaansche Orchideeen. The name Aphyllorchis is derived from the Ancient Greek words aphyllos meaning "without leaves" and orchis meaning "testicle" or "orchid".

== List of species ==
The following is a list of species of Aphyllorchis recognised by the World Checklist of Selected Plant Families as at October 2018:

- Aphyllorchis acuminata J.J.Sm.
- Aphyllorchis alpina King & Pantl.
- Aphyllorchis angustipetala J.J.Sm.
- Aphyllorchis anomala Dockrill
- Aphyllorchis arfakensis J.J.Sm.
- Aphyllorchis caudata Rolfe ex Downie
- Aphyllorchis elata Schltr.
- Aphyllorchis evrardii Gagnep.
- Aphyllorchis exilis Schltr.
- Aphyllorchis gollani Duthie
- Aphyllorchis halconensis Ames
- Aphyllorchis kemulensis J.J.Sm.
- Aphyllorchis maliauensis Suetsugu, Suleiman & Tsukaya
- Aphyllorchis montana Rchb.f.
  - Aphyllorchis montana var. montana
  - Aphyllorchis montana f. pingtungensis T.P.Lin
  - Aphyllorchis montana var. rotundipetala (C.S.Leou, S.K.Yu & C.T.Lee) T.P.Lin
- Aphyllorchis pallida Blume
- Aphyllorchis queenslandica Dockrill
- Aphyllorchis siantanensis J.J.Sm.
- Aphyllorchis simplex Tang & F.T.Wang
- Aphyllorchis spiculaea Rchb.f.
- Aphyllorchis striata (Ridl.) Schltr.
- Aphyllorchis sumatrana J.J.Sm.
- Aphyllorchis yachangensis Ying Qin & Yan Liu

== Distribution and habitat ==
Most species in the genus Aphyllorchis grows at low altitudes in wet forests, often near streams. They are found in India, Sri Lanka, China, Japan, Taiwan, Thailand, Myanmar, Malaysia, the Philippines, Indonesia, New Guinea and Australia. Two species are endemic to tropical Queensland and one to China.
