= Gastrodia gunatillekeorum =

Scientific classification
- Kingdom: Plantae
- Clade: Tracheophytes
- Clade: Angiosperms
- Clade: Monocots
- Order: Asparagales
- Family: Orchidaceae
- Subfamily: Epidendroideae
- Tribe: Gastrodieae
- Genus: Gastrodia
- Species: G. gunatillekeorum

Binomial name
- Gastrodia gunatillekeorum Bandara, Priyankara & Kumar

Species of potato orchid

Gastrodia gunatillekeorum is a new species of potato orchid discovered in Morningside area of Sinharaja rainforest and described in 2020. Each with less 100 mature individuals, only three small populations have been discovered as yet. This plant was named after Nimal Gunatilleke and Savithri Gunatilleke.

It is morphologically similar to Gastrodia spatulata, which is native to Indonesia, due to both species having a white flower with yellowish-orange colouring on the inner wall of the perianth tube and the free part of perianth tube reflexed backwards. The two species however differ in respect to the spathulate to linear petals which are shorter than sepals, fused only at the base and present inside the perianth tube; the labellum are elongate-elliptic and column broadest in the middle part in G. spatulata, whereas the petals as long as sepals with apical 1/3rd part free (rest fused with sepals) and reflexed backwards, labellum rhomboid in shape, column broadest towards the apex in G. gunatillekeorum.

The only other Gastrodia species known from Sri Lanka is G. zeylanica, a taller species without any yellow colouration in its dull white flowers.
