= Gastrodia agnicellus =

Scientific classification
- Kingdom: Plantae
- Clade: Tracheophytes
- Clade: Angiosperms
- Clade: Monocots
- Order: Asparagales
- Family: Orchidaceae
- Subfamily: Epidendroideae
- Tribe: Gastrodieae
- Genus: Gastrodia
- Species: G. agnicellus

Binomial name
- Gastrodia agnicellus Hermans & P.J.Cribb

Orchid species

Gastrodia agnicellus is a species of orchid in the genus Gastrodia, found in Madagascar and described in Curtis's Botanical Magazine by Johan Hermans in 2020. It has been said to be "the ugliest orchid in the world", with "brown, fleshy and grotesque" flowers. Like all species in its genus, it is leafless and mycotrophic.

The species name agnicellus means "little lamb" or "lambkin". The name "refers to the woolly covering on the rhizome, the ear-like petals and also alludes to the name of the botanical artist who brought the new species to life in her drawing." For her work on this species the illustrator, Deborah Lambkin, won the 2020 Margaret Flockton Award, an annual award "for excellence in scientific botanical illustration" made by the Royal Botanic Garden, Sydney.

== Distribution and habitat ==
Gastrodia agnicellus has only been found in the Vatovavy-Fitovinany region in the southeast of Madagascar. It lives in the shade in the forests of Madagascar, often under leaf litter and humus.
