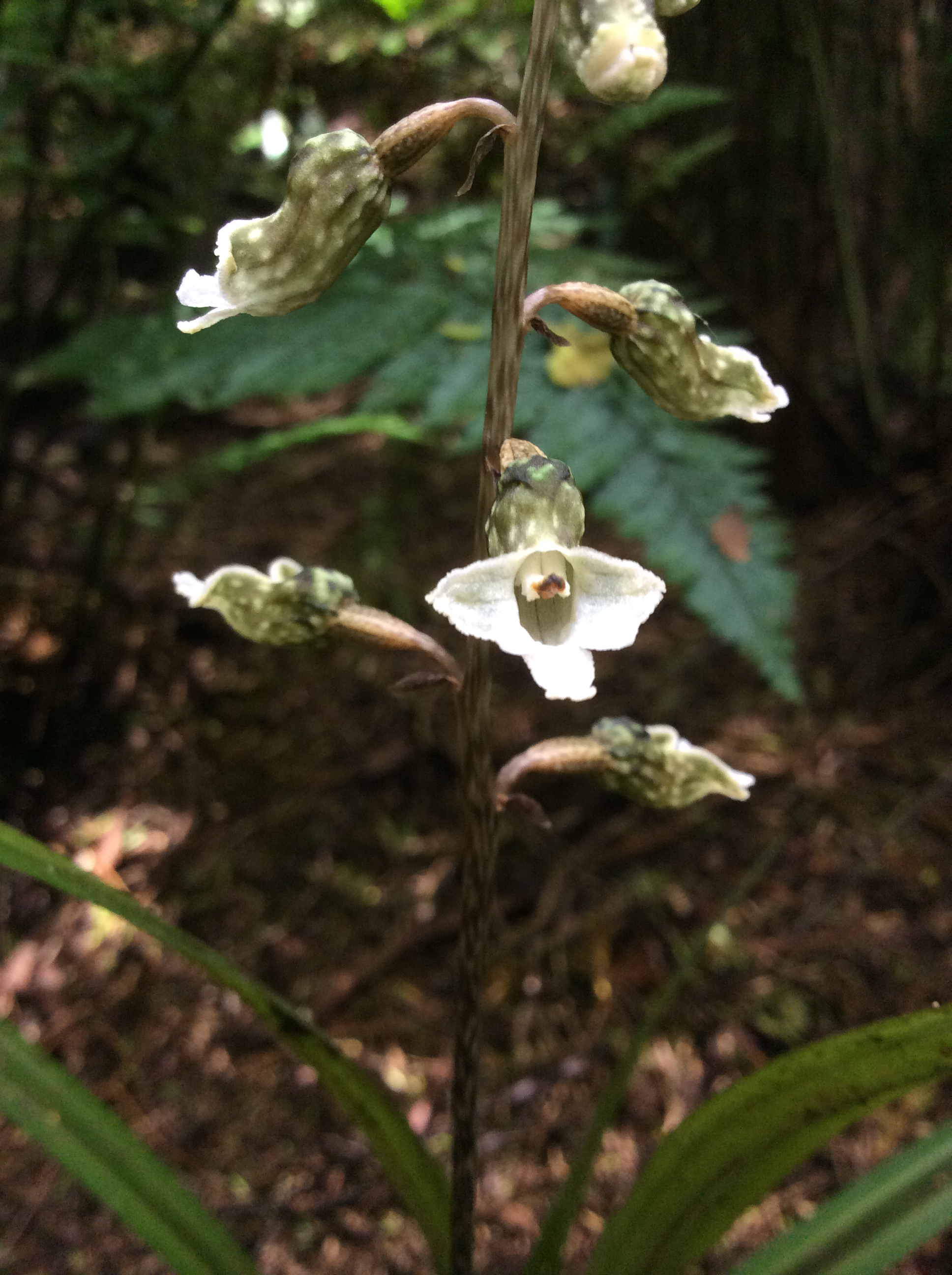
- Gastrodia cunninghamii in Invercargill

Conservation status
- Not Threatened (NZ TCS)

Scientific classification
- Kingdom: Plantae
- Clade: Tracheophytes
- Clade: Angiosperms
- Clade: Monocots
- Order: Asparagales
- Family: Orchidaceae
- Subfamily: Epidendroideae
- Tribe: Gastrodieae
- Genus: Gastrodia
- Species: G. cunninghamii

Binomial name
- Gastrodia cunninghamii Hook.f.

= Gastrodia cunninghamii =

Species of orchid

Gastrodia cunninghamii, or black orchid, black potato orchid, or perei in Māori, is a species of parasitic orchid, endemic to New Zealand. It grows in the North Island, south of the Waikato, and in the South Island, Stewart Island, and the Chathams. It is not threatened, and is widespread in forested areas.

== Description ==
The orchid grows to a height of 100 cm (39 in), and has an erect stem and swollen rhizomes. It can be distinguished from other members of Gastrodia due to its short column, not visible at the flower mouth.

== Taxonomy ==
The species was first described in 1853 by Joseph Dalton Hooker. The type specimen was gathered in the Ruahines.

== Etymology ==
The species epithet refers to botanist Allan Cunningham. Māori language names include perei and hūperei. Common names in English include black orchid, potato orchid and black potato orchid.

== Ecology ==
Gastrodia cunninghamii is a parasitic orchid, which does not photosynthesise, and has no leaves. It is dependent upon a symbiotic relationship with a fungus, Armillaria novae-zelandiae for nutrients, which in turn takes nutrients from host trees. It is often found near Nothofagus trees.

The species flowers between November to February.

== Distribution and range ==
The species is endemic to New Zealand, growing in the North Island, south of the Waikato, and in the South Island, Stewart Island, and the Chathams. It is commonly found in forested areas, thriving in dark undergrowth.

== In Māori culture ==
The rhizomes are valued as a traditional food by Māori.

== Gallery ==
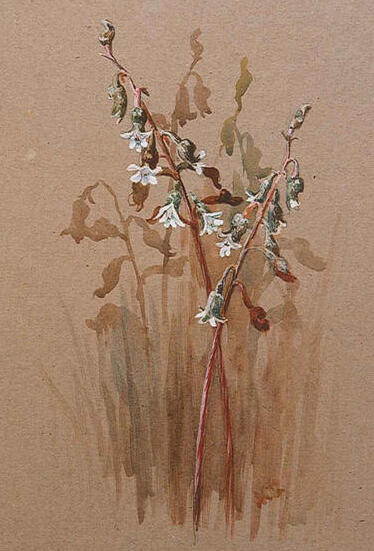
Botanic illustration by Nina Jones, c. 1920

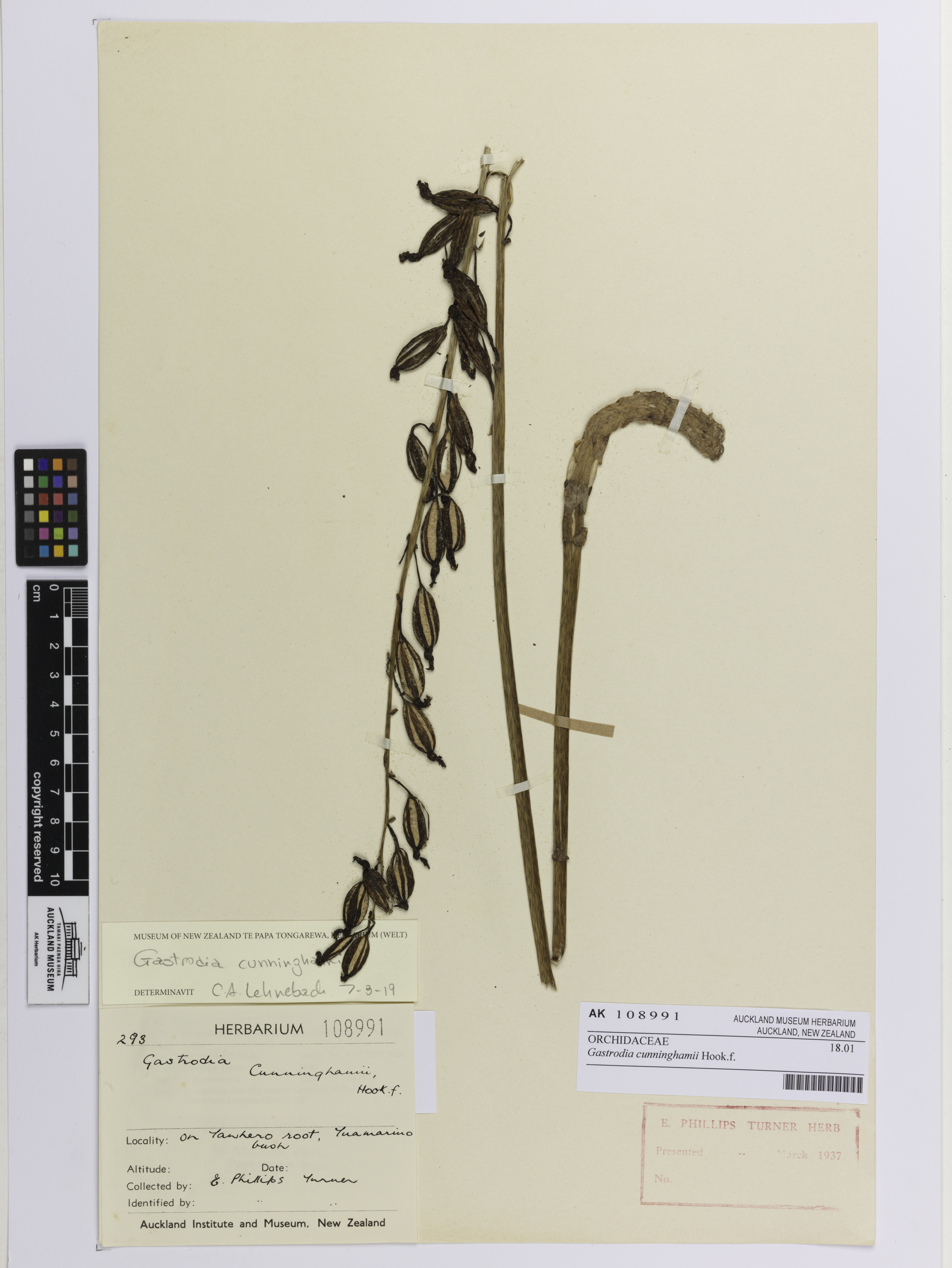
Herbarium specimen

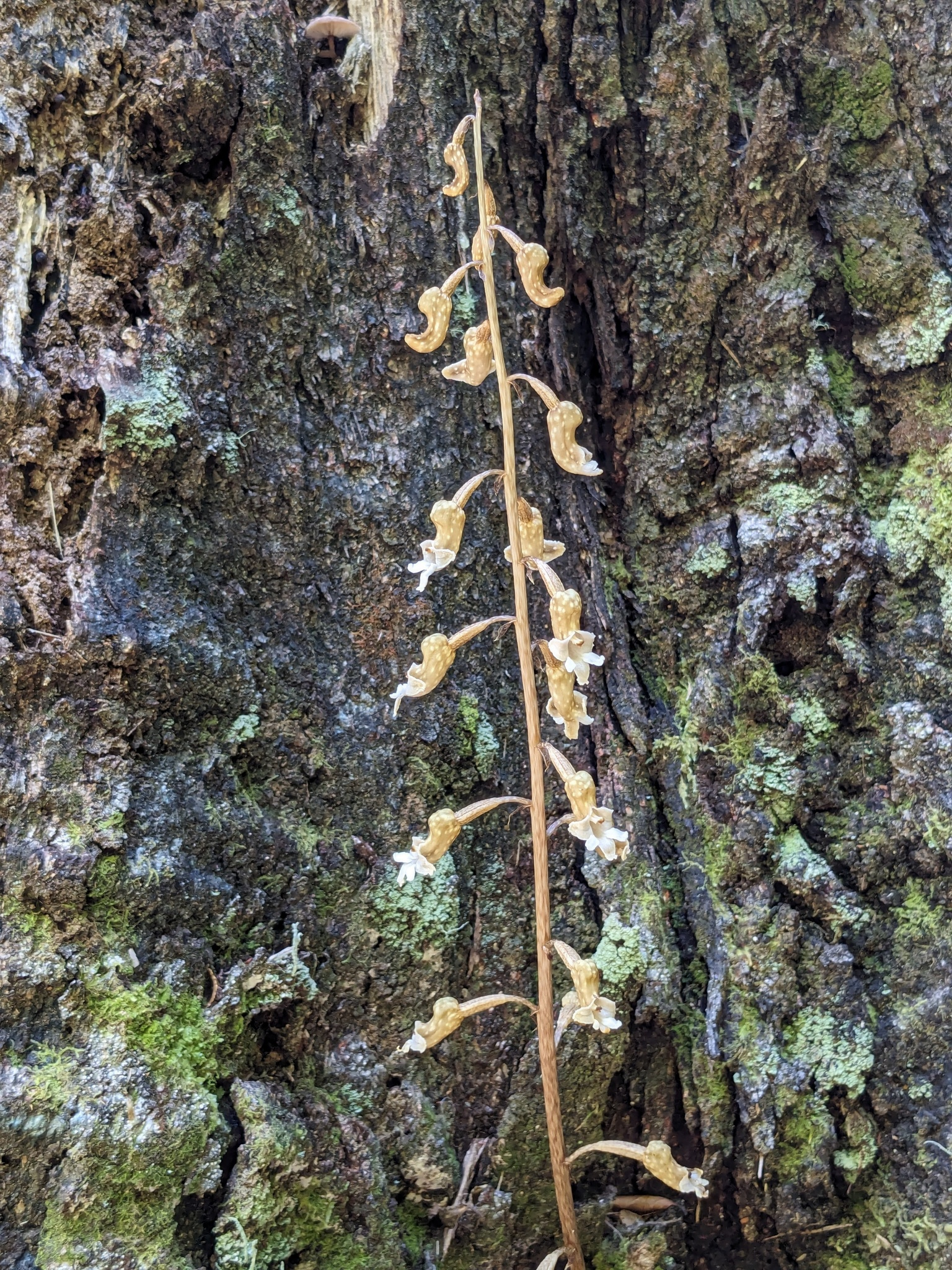
Growing in a forested area

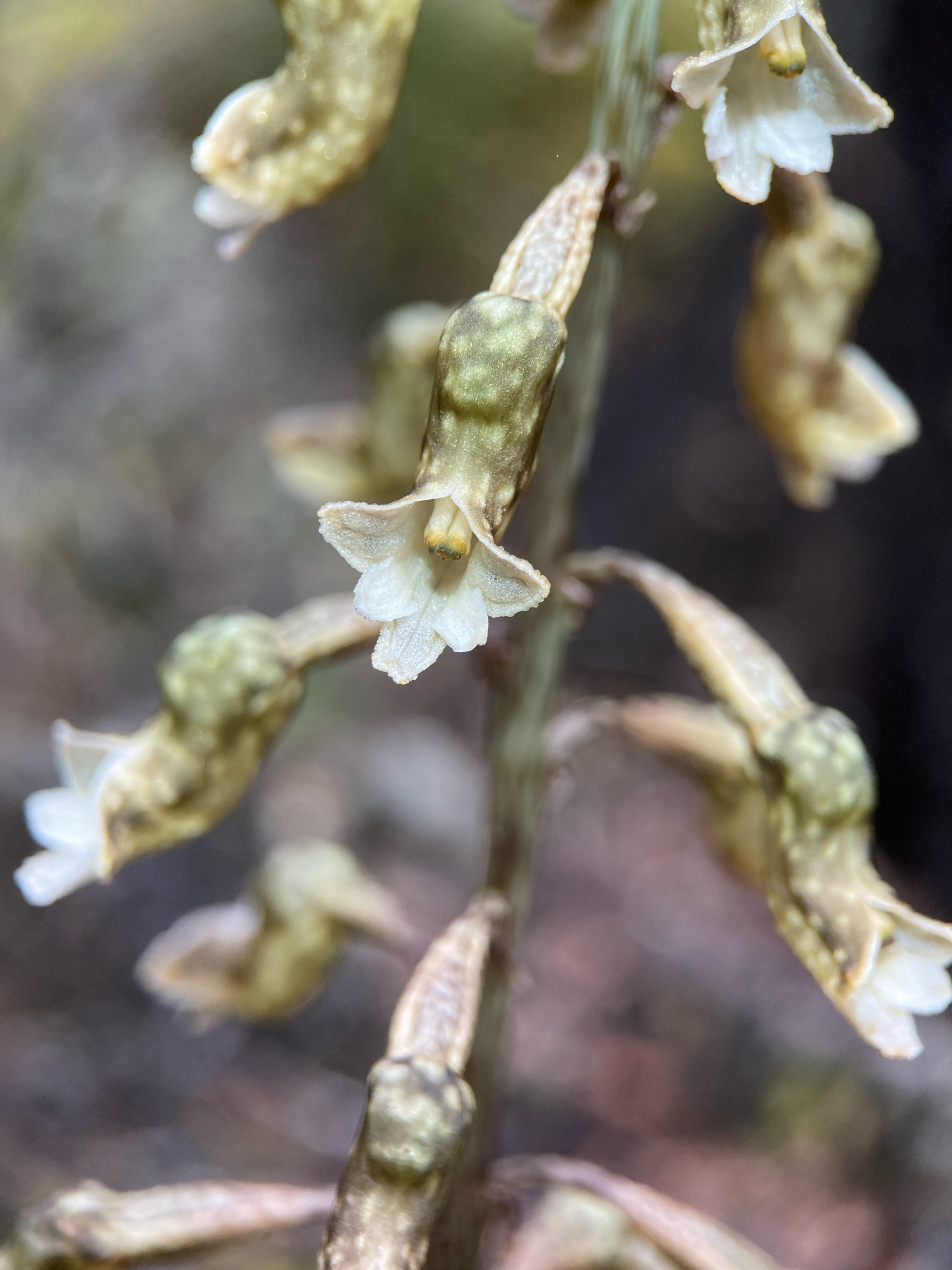
Flowers
