= Gastrodia crebriflora =

Dense potato orchid

Scientific classification
- Kingdom: Plantae
- Clade: Tracheophytes
- Clade: Angiosperms
- Clade: Monocots
- Order: Asparagales
- Family: Orchidaceae
- Subfamily: Epidendroideae
- Tribe: Gastrodieae
- Genus: Gastrodia
- Species: G. crebriflora

Binomial name
- Gastrodia crebriflora D.L.Jones

Species of orchid

Gastrodia crebriflora, commonly known as dense potato orchid, is a leafless terrestrial mycotrophic orchid in the family Orchidaceae. It has a pale brown flowering stem and up to thirty-five crowded, drooping, white to pale brown flowers. It is only known from the Blackdown Tableland in Queensland, Australia.

== Description ==
Gastrodia crebriflora is a leafless terrestrial, mycotrophic herb that has a shiny, fleshy, pale brown flowering stem bearing ten and thirty-five flowers pale brown to white, drooping, tube-shaped flowers. The sepals and petals are joined, forming a tube about 12–14 mm (0.5–0.6 in) long with spreading tips. The tube has a warty base and is white inside. The labellum is about 10–12 mm (0.4–0.5 in) long, about 3.5 mm (0.1 in) wide and completely enclosed in the tube. Flowering occurs from September to October but the flowers are self-pollinating and short-lived.

== Taxonomy and naming ==
Gastrodia crebriflora was first formally described in 1991 by David Jones from a specimen collected on the Blackdown Tableland in 1988. The description was published in Australian Orchid Research. The specific epithet (crebriflora) means "crowded - flowered".

== Distribution and habitat ==
The dense potato orchid grows in loose groups in tall forest on the Blackdown Tableland.

== Conservation ==
This orchid is classed as "vulnerable" under the Queensland Government Nature Conservation Act 1992.
