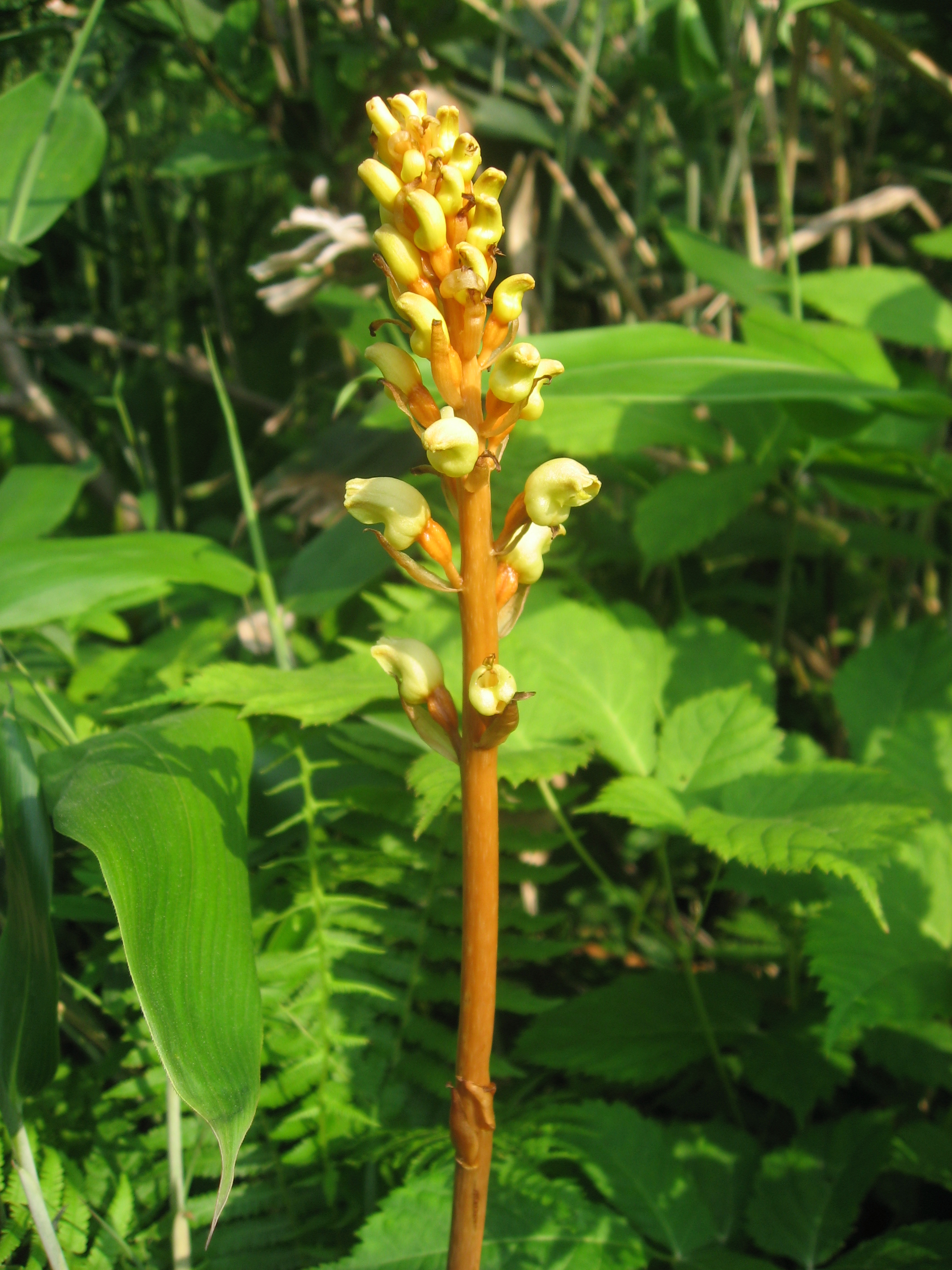
- Gastrodia elata in Fukushima Prefecture

Scientific classification
- Kingdom: Plantae
- Clade: Tracheophytes
- Clade: Angiosperms
- Clade: Monocots
- Order: Asparagales
- Family: Orchidaceae
- Subfamily: Epidendroideae
- Tribe: Gastrodieae
- Genus: Gastrodia; R.Br.

Synonyms
- Demorchis D.L.Jones & M.A.Clem.; Epiphanes Blume; Gamoplexis Falc. ex Lindl.; Leptogastrodia M.A.Clem. & D.L.Jones; Neoclemensia Carr

= Gastrodia =

Potato orchids

Genus of orchids

Gastrodia, commonly known as potato orchids, is a genus of terrestrial leafless orchids in the family Orchidaceae, about ninety of which have been described. Orchids in this genus have fleshy, upright stems and small to medium-sized resupinate flowers with narrow sepals and petals. They are native to Asia (China, the Russian Far East, Japan, Korea, Southeast Asia, the Indian subcontinent), Australia, New Zealand, central Africa, and various islands of the Indian and Pacific Oceans.

== Description ==
Orchids in the genus Gastrodia are leafless, terrestrial, mycotrophic herbs with a fleshy, underground rhizome and an upright flowering stem with a few to many brownish, resupinate flowers. The sepals and petals are fused to form a bell-shaped or irregular tube with the tips free. The petals are usually much smaller than the sepals and the labellum has three lobes and is fully enclosed in the tube.

== Taxonomy ==
The genus Gastrodia was first formally described in 1810 by Robert Brown and the description was published in Prodromus Florae Novae Hollandiae et Insulae Van Diemen. The type species is Gastrodia sesamoides.

== List of species ==
The following is a list of species of Gastrodia recognised by Plants of the World Online as of September 2021:

- Gastrodia abscondita J.J.Sm. - Java
- Gastrodia africana Kraenzl. - Cameroon
- Gastrodia agnicellus Hermans & P.J.Cribb - Madagascar
- Gastrodia albida T.C.Hsu, & C.M.Kuo - Taiwan
- Gastrodia albidoides Y.H.Tan & T.C.Hsu - Yunnan
- Gastrodia amamiana Suetsugu - Japan
- Gastrodia angusta S.Chow & S.C.Chen - Yunnan
- Gastrodia appendiculata C.S.Leou & N.J.Chung
- Gastrodia arunachalensis S.N.Hegde & A.N.Rao – Arunachal Pradesh
- Gastrodia ballii P.J.Cribb & Browning - Malawi, Zimbabwe, Mozambique
- Gastrodia bambu Metusala - Java
- Gastrodia bawanglingensis Z.Heng Chen, Z.Yang Zhang & X.Q.Song
- Gastrodia boninensis Tuyama - Ogasawara-shoto (Bonin Islands of Japan)
- Gastrodia cajanoae Barcelona & Pelser - Java, Taiwan
- Gastrodia callosa J.J.Sm. - Java, Taiwan
- Gastrodia celebica Schltr. - Sulawesi
- Gastrodia clausa T.C.Hsu, S.W.Chung & C.M.Kuo - Taiwan, Okinawa
- Gastrodia confusa Honda & Tuyama - Taiwan, Korea, Japan, Bonin Islands, Ryukyu Islands
- Gastrodia confusoides T.C.Hsu, S.W.Chung & C.M.Kuo - Taiwan
- Gastrodia cooperae Lehnebach & J.R.Rolfe - New Zealand
- Gastrodia crassisepala L.O.Williams - New Guinea
- Gastrodia crebriflora D.L.Jones - Queensland
- Gastrodia crispa J.J.Sm. – Java
- Gastrodia cunninghamii Hook.f. - Vanuatu, New Zealand (including Chatham Island)
- Gastrodia damingshanensis A.Q.Hu & T.C.Hsu
- Gastrodia daweishanensis A.Q.Hu & T.C.Hsu
- Gastrodia dewildeorum Schuit.
- Gastrodia dyeriana King & Pantl. - Sikkim, Darjiling
- Gastrodia effusa P.T.Ong & P.O'Byrne - Sabah, Peninsular Malaysia
- Gastrodia elata Blume - much of China (including Tibet and Taiwan), Japan, Korea, Russian Far East, Assam, Bhutan, Nepal
- Gastrodia elatoides W.C.Huang, G.W.Hu & Q.F.Wang - Madagascar
- Gastrodia exilis Hook.f. - India, Assam, Thailand, Sumatra
- Gastrodia falconeri D.L.Jones & M.A.Clem. - Pakistan, northern India, Nepal
- Gastrodia fimbriata Suddee - Thailand
- Gastrodia flavilabella S.S.Ying - Taiwan
- Gastrodia flexistyla T.C.Hsu & C.M.Kuo - Taiwan
- Gastrodia foetida Koidz.
- Gastrodia fontinalis T.P.Lin - Taiwan
- Gastrodia fujianensis Liang Ma, Xin Y.Chen & S.P.Chen - China (Fujian)
- Gastrodia gracilis Blume - Taiwan, Honshu
- Gastrodia grandilabris Carr - Sabah
- Gastrodia gunatillekeorum Bandara, Priyankara & Kumar - Sri Lanka
- Gastrodia holttumii Carr
- Gastrodia huapingenisi X.Y.Huang, A.Q.Hu & Yan Liu
- Gastrodia indica M.Khanal
- Gastrodia isabelensis T.C.Hsu
- Gastrodia javanica (Blume) Lindl. - Indonesia, Malaysia, Philippines, Thailand, Taiwan, Fujian, Ryukyu Islands
- Gastrodia kachinensis X.H.Jin & L.A.Ye – Myanmar
- Gastrodia kaohsiungensis T.P.Lin – Taiwan
- Gastrodia kuroshimensis Suetsugu - Japan
- Gastrodia lacista D.L.Jones - Western Australia
- Gastrodia leoui T.C.Hsu & C.M.Kuo
- Gastrodia leucochila T.C.Hsu & Z.H.Chen
- Gastrodia longiflora Suetsugu
- Gastrodia longistyla Q.Liu, J.D.Ya & X.H.Jin
- Gastrodia longitubularis Q.W.Meng, X.Q.Song & Y.B.Luo - Hainan
- Gastrodia madagascariensis H.Perrier ex Martos & Bytebier - Madagascar
- Gastrodia major Aver. - Vietnam
- Gastrodia maliauensis Suetsugu, Suleiman & Tsukaya - Borneo (Sabah)
- Gastrodia menghaiensis Z.H.Tsi & S.C.Chen - Yunnan
- Gastrodia minor Petrie - New Zealand
- Gastrodia mishmensis A.N.Rao, Harid. & S.N.Hegde
- Gastrodia molloyi Lehneback & J.R.Rolfe - New Zealand
- Gastrodia munasingheae Atthan., C.Bandara & Kumar
- Gastrodia nantoensis T.C.Hsu, C.M.Kuo ex T.P.Lin
- Gastrodia nipponica Honda) Tuyama - Taiwan, Japan, Ryukyu Islands
- Gastrodia nipponicoides Suetsugu
- Gastrodia × nippouraiensis Suetsugu & T.C.Hsu - Nansei-shoto
- Gastrodia okinawensis Suetsugu
- Gastrodia papuana Schltr. - New Guinea
- Gastrodia peichatieniana S.S.Ying
- Gastrodia phangngaensis Suddee
- Gastrodia procera G.W.Carr - N.S.W., Vic., A.C.T., Tas.
- Gastrodia pubilabiata Y.Sawa - Taiwan, Japan
- Gastrodia punctata Aver. - Vietnam
- Gastrodia pushparaga Gopallawa, A.Perera & Madola
- Gastrodia putaoensis X.H.Jin - Myanmar
- Gastrodia qingyunshanensis Jiu X.Huang, H.Xu & H.J.Yang
- Gastrodia queenslandica Dockrill - Queensland
- Gastrodia rubinea T.P.Lin - Taiwan
- Gastrodia rwandensis Eb.Fisch. & Killmann - Rwanda
- Gastrodia sabahensis J.J.Wood & A.L.Lamb
- Gastrodia selabintanensis Tsukaya & Hidayat
- Gastrodia sesamoides R.Br. - Australia
- Gastrodia shimizuana Tuyama - Iriomote, Taiwan
- Gastrodia sikkimensis M.Khanal & S.Sarkar
- Gastrodia silentvalleyana C.S.Kumar, P.C.S.Kumar, Sibi & S.Anil Kumar - Kerala
- Gastrodia similis Bosser - Réunion
- Gastrodia solomonensis T.C.Hsu
- Gastrodia spatulata (Carr) J.J.Wood - Sabah
- Gastrodia stapfii Hayata
- Gastrodia sui C.S.Leou, T.C.Hsu & C.R.Yeh - Taiwan
- Gastrodia surcula D.L.Jones - New South Wales
- Gastrodia taiensis Tuyama - Vietnam
- Gastrodia takeshimensis Suetsugu
- Gastrodia tembatensis P.T.Ong & P.O'Byrne - Peninsular Malaysia
- Gastrodia theana Aver. - Vietnam
- Gastrodia thilakapremae Atthan., C.Bandara & Kumar
- Gastrodia tonkinensis Aver. & Averyanova
- Gastrodia tuberculata F.Y.Liu & S.C.Chen - Yunnan
- Gastrodia umbrosa B.Gray - Queensland
- Gastrodia uraiensis T.C.Hsu & C.M.Kuo - Taiwan
- Gastrodia urceolata D.L. Jones - Queensland
- Gastrodia verrucosa Blume - Thailand, Peninsular Malaysia, Java, Sumatra
- Gastrodia vescula D.L.Jones - South Australia
- Gastrodia wuyishanensis Da M.Li & C.D.Liu - Fujian
- Gastrodia zeylanica Schltr. - Sri Lanka
