= Gastrodia vescula =

Small potato orchid

Scientific classification
- Kingdom: Plantae
- Clade: Tracheophytes
- Clade: Angiosperms
- Clade: Monocots
- Order: Asparagales
- Family: Orchidaceae
- Subfamily: Epidendroideae
- Tribe: Gastrodieae
- Genus: Gastrodia
- Species: G. vescula

Binomial name
- Gastrodia vescula D.L.Jones

Species of orchid

Gastrodia vescula, commonly known as small potato orchid, is a leafless terrestrial mycotrophic orchid in the family Orchidaceae. It has a very thin, brittle, light brown flowering stem with up to three pale brown flowers that are white on the inside. It is only known from a small area near the border between South Australia and Victoria.

== Description ==
Gastrodia vescula is a leafless terrestrial, mycotrophic herb that has a very thin, brittle pale brown flowering stem 50–200 cm (20–80 in) tall with up to three, mostly drooping, smooth light brown flowers. The sepals and petals are joined, forming a tube about 10–12 mm (0.4–0.5 in) long and white inside with the lobes about 2 mm (0.08 in) long. The labellum is about 9–11 mm (0.35–0.43 in) long, about 3 mm (0.12 in) wide with three lobes and completely enclosed in the tube. Flowering occurs from November to December.

== Taxonomy and naming ==
Gastrodia vescula was first formally described in 1991 by David Jones from a specimen collected in a nature reserve near Mount Gambier in 1988. The description was published in Australian Orchid Research. The specific epithet (vescula) is a Latin word meaning "little" or "trifling" referring to the habit of this orchid.

== Distribution and habitat ==
The small potato orchid is only known from small area in the far southeast of South Australia and far western Victoria where it grows in dense, heathy forest.
