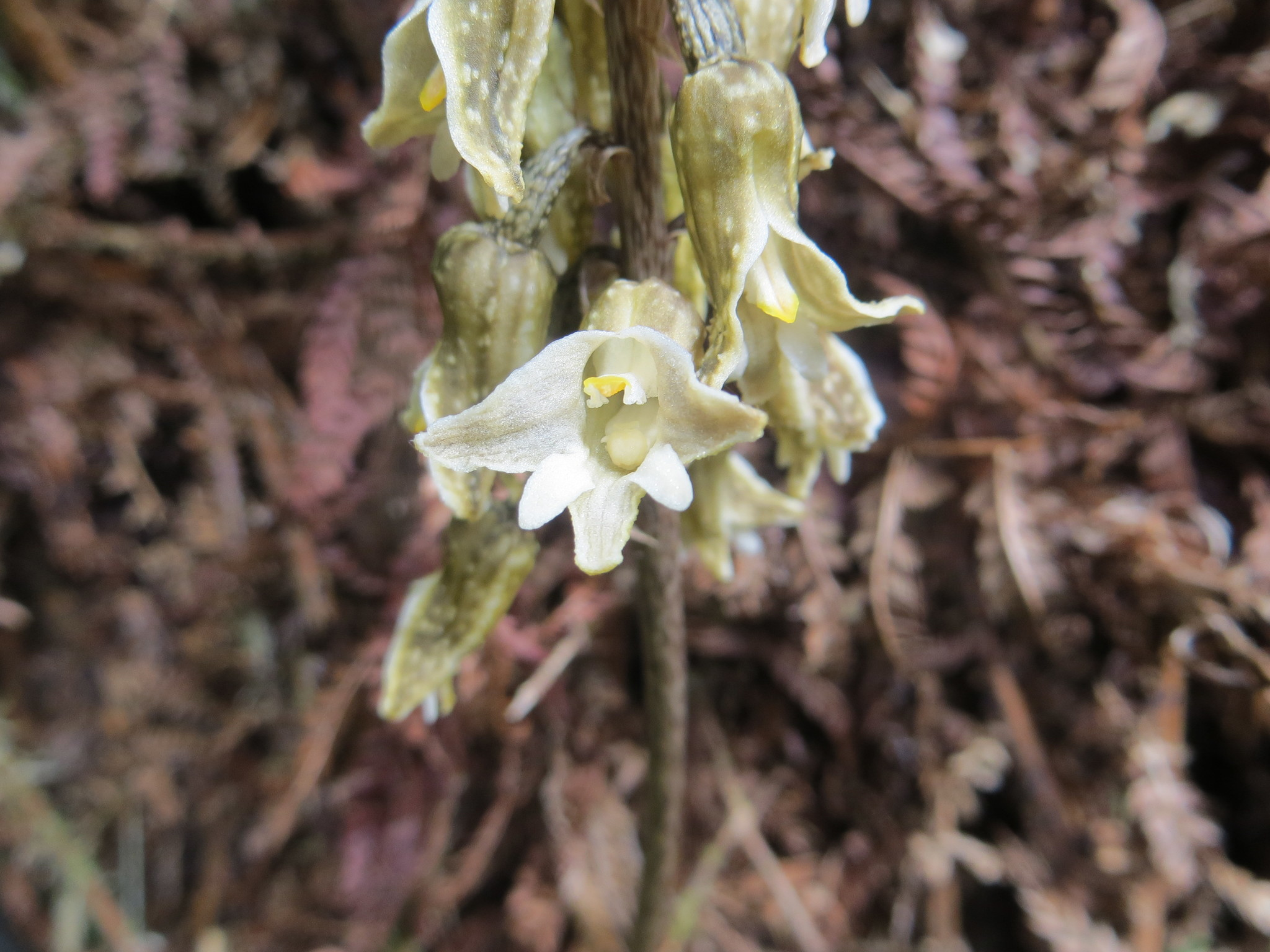

Conservation status
- Not Threatened (NZ TCS)

Scientific classification
- Kingdom: Plantae
- Clade: Tracheophytes
- Clade: Angiosperms
- Clade: Monocots
- Order: Asparagales
- Family: Orchidaceae
- Subfamily: Epidendroideae
- Tribe: Gastrodieae
- Genus: Gastrodia
- Species: G. molloyi

Binomial name
- Gastrodia molloyi Lehnebach & J.R.Rolfe

= Gastrodia molloyi =

Species of orchid

Gastrodia molloyi is a species of plant in the family Orchidaceae. It is endemic to New Zealand. It was first formally described in 2016 by Carlos Adolfo Lehnebach and Jeremy Rolfe and the description was published in the journal Phytotaxa. The specific epithet (molloyi) honours the New Zealand botanist, Brian Molloy.

== Gallery ==
Flower showing column

whole plant

Habitat
