= Gastrodia tuberculata =

Conservation status
- Endangered (IUCN 3.1)

Scientific classification
- Kingdom: Plantae
- Clade: Tracheophytes
- Clade: Angiosperms
- Clade: Monocots
- Order: Asparagales
- Family: Orchidaceae
- Subfamily: Epidendroideae
- Tribe: Gastrodieae
- Genus: Gastrodia
- Species: G. tuberculata

Binomial name
- Gastrodia tuberculata F.Y.Liu & S.C.Chen

Species of orchid

Gastrodia tuberculata is a species of plant in the family Orchidaceae. It is endemic to China.
