= Diana Grenfell =

British plantswoman (1935–2021)

- Born: Diana Margaret Eva; 29 March 1935
- Died: 19 March 2021 (aged 85)
- Known for: breeding hostas

Diana Grenfell (29 March 1935 – 19 March 2021) was a British gardener and horticultural writer who was a world expert on hostas, a genus of ornamental plants.

== Personal life ==
Diana Margaret Eva was born 29 March 1935 in Surrey, England. She was married to Roger Grounds. She used Diana Grenfell as her professional name.

She died 19 March 2021.

== Career ==
She started her own hosta collection and later, with her husband, founded and owned the Apple Court Gardens and Nursery in Hampshire. This contained around 1000 varieties, including at one time the plants that formed a National Collection of Hostas within the National Council for the Conservation of Plants and Gardens scheme. She introduced new cultivars.

In 1981 she was one of the founders of the British Hosta and Hemerocallis Society.

== Publications ==
She wrote several books about hostas and daylilies including The New Encyclopedia of Hostas (2009), RHS Wisley Handbook: Hostas (2008) Octopus Publishing Group, pp96, ISBN 9781845333829, The Gardener's Guide to Growing Hostas (2001) David & Charles, 160pp, ISBN 9780715312773, The Gardener's Guide to Growing Daylilies (2001) David & Charles, 160pp, ISBN 9780715306956 and Hosta: The Flowering Foliage Plant (illustrations by Jenny Brasier) (1990) Pavilion Books, 192pp, ISBN 9780713450729. She also co-authored The New Encyclopedia of Hostas with Michael Shadrack (Second edition 2009, Timber Press, ISBN 9780881929607).

== Awards ==
In 1987 she was awarded the Alex J. Summers Distinguished Merit Award by the American Hosta Society. Grenfell was awarded the Royal Horticultural Society Veitch Memorial Medal in 2016.
