= Gastrodia queenslandica =

Rainforest bells

Scientific classification
- Kingdom: Plantae
- Clade: Embryophytes
- Clade: Tracheophytes
- Clade: Spermatophytes
- Clade: Angiosperms
- Clade: Monocots
- Order: Asparagales
- Family: Orchidaceae
- Subfamily: Epidendroideae
- Tribe: Gastrodieae
- Genus: Gastrodia
- Species: G. queenslandica

Binomial name
- Gastrodia queenslandica Dockrill

Synonyms
- Demorchis queenslandica (Dockrill) D.L.Jones & M.A.Clem.

Species of orchid

Gastrodia queenslandica, commonly known as rainforest bells, is a leafless terrestrial mycotrophic orchid in the family Orchidaceae. It has one or two small, yellowish brown, tube-shaped flowers on a thin, brittle flowering stem and grows in rainforest in tropical north Queensland, Australia.

== Description ==
Gastrodia queenslandica is a leafless terrestrial, mycotrophic herb that has a thin, fleshy, brittle, light brown flowering stem bearing one or two yellowish brown, tube-shaped flowers that are orange-coloured inside. The sepals and petals are joined, forming a tube about 10 mm (0.4 in) long with spreading tips. The tube is rough on the outside and orange-coloured and smooth inside. The labellum is about 5.5 mm (0.2 in) long, 3 mm (0.1 in) wide and completely enclosed in the tube. Flowering occurs from November to January.

== Taxonomy and naming ==
Gastrodia queenslandica was first formally described in 1964 by Alick William Dockrill who published the description in The North Queensland Naturalist. In 2004, David Jones and Mark Clements changed the name to Demorchis queenslandica but the change has not been accepted by Plants of the World Online.

== Distribution and habitat ==
Rainforest bells grows in near coastal rainforest between the Russell River and the McIlwraith Range but is rarely seen.

== Conservation ==
This orchid is classed as "near threatened" under the Queensland Government Nature Conservation Act 1992.
