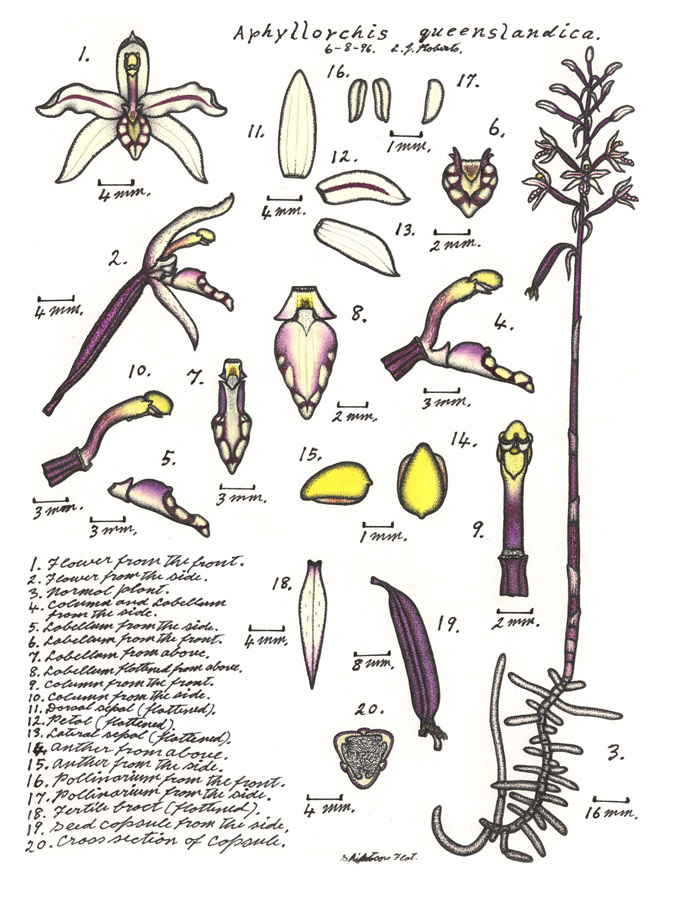
- Illustration by Lewis Roberts

Conservation status
- Near Threatened (NCA)

Scientific classification
- Kingdom: Plantae
- Clade: Tracheophytes
- Clade: Angiosperms
- Clade: Monocots
- Order: Asparagales
- Family: Orchidaceae
- Subfamily: Epidendroideae
- Genus: Aphyllorchis
- Species: A. queenslandica

Binomial name
- Aphyllorchis queenslandica Dockrill

= Aphyllorchis queenslandica =

Yellow pauper orchid

Species of flowering plant

Aphyllorchis queenslandica, commonly known as the yellow pauper orchid, is a leafless terrestrial mycotrophic orchid in the family Orchidaceae. It has up to twelve dull yellow flowers on a thin, fleshy, purple flowering stem and is endemic to tropical north Queensland where it grows in rainforest.

== Description ==
Aphyllorchis queenslandica is a leafless, terrestrial mycotrophic herb that has a thin, fleshy purple flowering stem 300–700 mm (10–30 in) long with white flecks. The plants lack true leaves but have colourless, leaf-like bracts on the flowering stem, each bract 5–30 mm (0.2–1 in) long and 6–11 mm (0.2–0.4 in) wide with three longitudinal, parallel veins. There are between six and twelve resupinate, dull yellow flowers 8–10 mm (0.3–0.4 in) long and 10–12 mm (0.4–0.5 in) wide. The dorsal sepal is 6–7 mm (0.2–0.3 in) long, about 2 mm (0.08 in) wide. The lateral sepals are 5–6 mm (0.20–0.24 in) long, about 2 mm (0.08 in) wide, curved and spread widely apart from each other. The labellum is a similar size to the petals, more or less boat-shaped and has three lobes. The middle lobe projects forwards and the side lobes curve upwards. Flowering occurs between May and October.

== Taxonomy and naming ==
Aphyllorchis queenslandica was first described in 1965 by Alick William Dockrill from a specimen collected near Helenvale and the description was published in The Orchadian.

== Distribution and habitat ==
The yellow pauper orchid is found between Cooktown and Babinda from close to sea level up to an altitude of about 400 m (1,000 ft). It grows in rainforest, often close to streams.

== Conservation ==
This species is listed as "Near threatened" under the Queensland Government Nature Conservation Act 1992.
