= Aphyllorchis anomala =

Simple pauper orchid

Scientific classification
- Kingdom: Plantae
- Clade: Tracheophytes
- Clade: Angiosperms
- Clade: Monocots
- Order: Asparagales
- Family: Orchidaceae
- Subfamily: Epidendroideae
- Tribe: Neottieae
- Genus: Aphyllorchis
- Species: A. anomala

Binomial name
- Aphyllorchis anomala Dockrill

Species of flowering plant

Aphyllorchis anomala, commonly known as the simple pauper orchid, is a leafless terrestrial mycotrophic orchid in the family Orchidaceae. It has up to twenty white flowers with purple markings on a deep purple flowering stem and grows in shady rainforest in tropical north Queensland.

== Description ==
Aphyllorchis anomala is a leafless terrestrial, mycotrophic herb that has a fleshy, brittle, shiny dark purple flowering stem with between four and twenty white flowers with purple markings. The flowers are 10–12 mm (0.39–0.47 in) long and wide. The dorsal sepal is 10–12 mm (0.4–0.5 in) long, about 3 mm (0.12 in) wide and forms a hood over the column. The lateral sepals are a similar size, turn slightly downwards and spread widely apart from each other. The petals are about the same length but slightly narrower and often have twisted tips. The labellum is oblong, 9–11 mm (0.35–0.43 in) long, about 2.5 mm (0.1 in) wide and often has a twisted tip.

== Taxonomy and naming ==
Aphyllorchis anomala was first formally described in 1965 by Alick William Dockrill who published the description in The Orchadian. The specific epithet (anomala) is derived from the Ancient Greek word anomalos meaning "uneven", "irregular", "inconsistent", "abnormal", "unusual" or "deviating from the regular rule".

== Distribution and habitat ==
The simple pauper orchid grows near sea level in moist, shady rainforest mainly between Rossville and the Atherton Tableland and near Airlie Beach.
