= Gastrodia amamiana =

Scientific classification
- Kingdom: Plantae
- Clade: Tracheophytes
- Clade: Angiosperms
- Clade: Monocots
- Order: Asparagales
- Family: Orchidaceae
- Subfamily: Epidendroideae
- Tribe: Gastrodieae
- Genus: Gastrodia
- Species: G. amamiana

Binomial name
- Gastrodia amamiana Suetsugu, K.

Species of orchid

Gastrodia amamiana is a species of mycoheterotrophic orchid in the family Orchidaceae found in Amami-Oshima and Tokunoshima islands, in Japan. The species was first described in 2019, when Kenji Suetsugu of the Kobe University together with independent scientists Hidekazu Morita, Yohei Tashiro, Chiyoko Hara and Kazuki Yamamuro, came across the flower during a flora survey of the islands’ evergreen forests. The species is cleistogamous, and bears fruit without opening its flower.

== Distribution ==
The species present ranges is known only from the two localities, Amami-Oshima and Tokunoshima islands, in Japan.
