= G. africana =

G. africana may refer to:

- Gastrodia africana, an orchid species endemic to Cameroon
- Griffiniella africana, a cockroach species
- Gynacantha africana, a dragonfly species

== See also ==
- Africana (disambiguation)
