= Gastrodia urceolata =

White potato orchid

Scientific classification
- Kingdom: Plantae
- Clade: Tracheophytes
- Clade: Angiosperms
- Clade: Monocots
- Order: Asparagales
- Family: Orchidaceae
- Subfamily: Epidendroideae
- Tribe: Gastrodieae
- Genus: Gastrodia
- Species: G. urceolata

Binomial name
- Gastrodia urceolata D.L.Jones

Species of orchid

Gastrodia urceolata, commonly known as white potato orchid, is a leafless terrestrial mycotrophic orchid in the family Orchidaceae. It has a pale brown, fleshy flowering stem and up to fifty five upright, white to pale brown flowers. It is only known from a single population near Atherton in Queensland.

== Description ==
Gastrodia urceolata is a leafless terrestrial, mycotrophic herb that has a slightly shiny, fleshy, pale brown flowering stem 20–130 cm (8–50 in) tall. There are between ten and fifty upright white flowers which distinguish the species from other gastrodias in Australia. The sepals and petals are joined, forming a tube about 12–14 mm (0.5–0.6 in) long with spreading, warty tips about 2 mm (0.08 in) long. The labellum is about 12–14 mm (0.5–0.6 in) long, 7–8 mm (0.28–0.31 in) wide with three lobes and completely enclosed in the tube. Flowering occurs from October to December and is followed by upright, urn-shaped capsules 6 mm (0.2 in) long and wide.

== Taxonomy and naming ==
Gastrodia urceolata was first formally described in 1991 by David Jones from a specimen collected near Atherton in 1988. The description was published in Australian Orchid Research. The specific epithet (urceolata) is derived from the Latin word urceus meaning "pitcher" or "urn" referring to the shape of the capsule.

== Distribution and habitat ==
The white potato orchid is only known from a single population on the Atherton Tableland where it grows in forest.
