= Jill Smythies Award =

Award of the Linnean Society of London

The Jill Smythies Award of the Linnean Society of London was established in 1986 and is awarded annually to a botanical artist.

The award was established by Bertram Smythies, in honour of his wife, Florence Mary Smythies ("Jill"), whose career as a botanical artist was cut short by an accident to her right hand.

== Recipients of the Jill Smythies Award ==
- HyeWoo Shin (2025)
- Maria Alice de Rezende (2024)
- Sue Wickison (2023)
- Andrew Brown (2022)
- not awarded (2021)
- Alice Tangerini (2020)
- Deborah Lambkin (2019)
- Niki Simpson and Juliet Williamson (2018)
- Karin Douthit and David Williamson (2017)
- Anita Barley (2016)
- Claire Banks (2015)
- Esmee Somers Winkel (2014)
- not awarded (2013)
- not awarded (2012)
- Margaret Tebbs (2011)
- Susan Sex (2010)
- Halina Bednarek-Ochyra (2009)
- Patricia Eckel (2008)
- Jan van Os (2007)
- Bobbi Angell (2006)
- Lesley Elkan (2005)
- Lucy Theres Smith (2004)
- Maya Koistinen (2003)
- Jenny Brasier (2002)
- Juan Luis Castillo (2001)
- Bo Mossberg and Jean Annette Paton (2000)
- Pandora Sellars (1999)
- Rodella Anne Purves (1998)
- Celia Elizabeth Rosser (1997)
- Bent Jonsen (1996)
- Rosemary Wise (1995)
- Joy Claire Allison Dalby (1994)
- Caroline Mary Bates (1993)
- John Mark Fothergill (1992)
- Dale Edna Evans (1991)
- Gillian Condy (1990)
- Christabel King (1989)
- Ann Farrer (1988)

== See also ==
- List of European art awards
