= Gastrodia kuroshimensis =

Scientific classification
- Kingdom: Plantae
- Clade: Tracheophytes
- Clade: Angiosperms
- Clade: Monocots
- Order: Asparagales
- Family: Orchidaceae
- Subfamily: Epidendroideae
- Tribe: Gastrodieae
- Genus: Gastrodia
- Species: G. kuroshimensis

Binomial name
- Gastrodia kuroshimensis Suetsugu

Species of orchid

Gastrodia kuroshimensis is an unusual species of plant that was discovered in April 2016. It is mycoheterotrophic, meaning that it does not engage in photosynthesis like most plants but obtains energy from its host fungi. It is also cleistogamous, meaning that it produces flowers that never open. Since its flowers never open, it is self-fertilizing.

Thus far the species has only been found on the Japanese island of Kuroshima after which it is named.

Due to its dark habitat and cleistogamous flowers, it is not pollinated by insects, unlike most other species of orchids.
