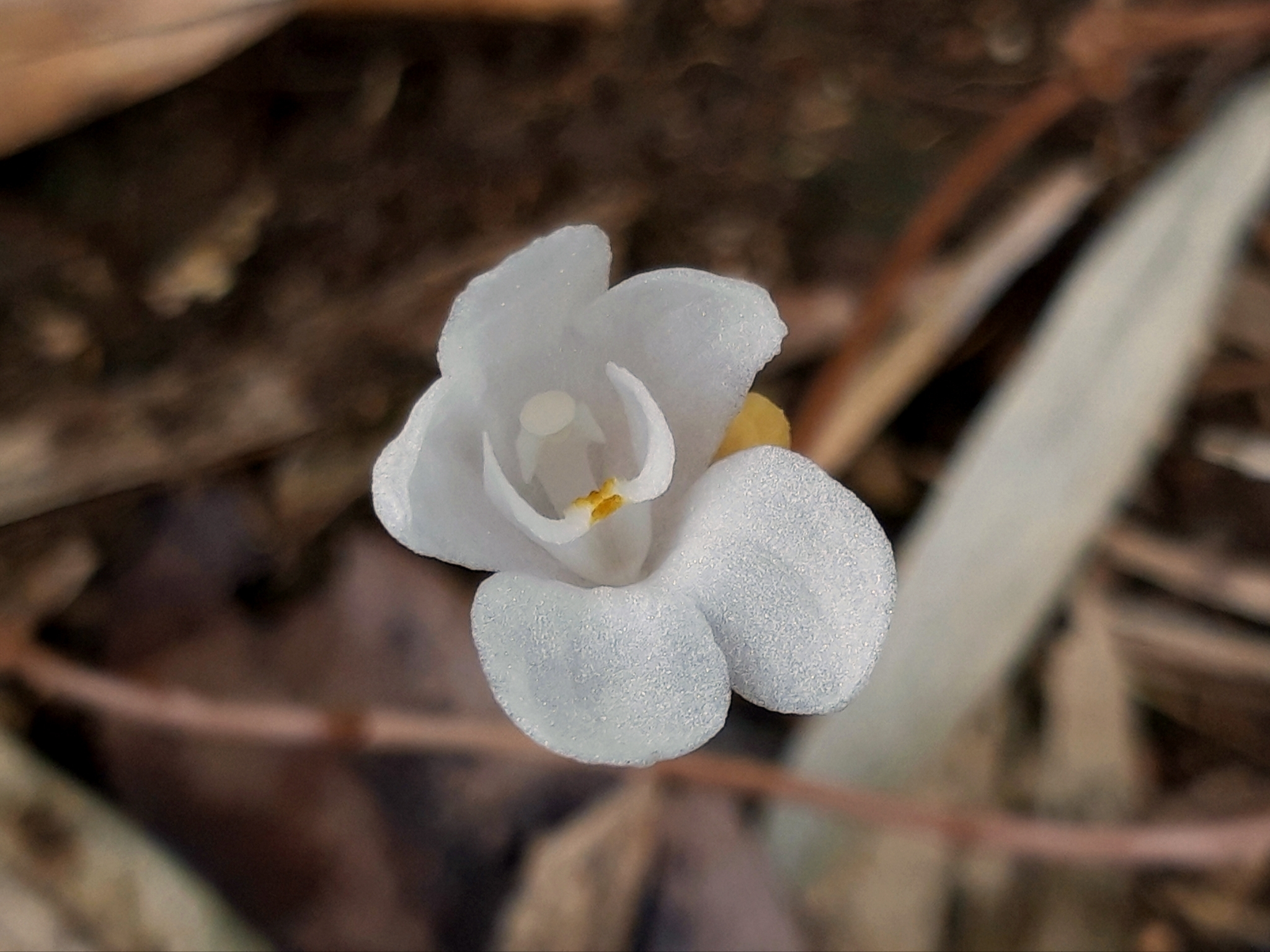

Scientific classification
- Kingdom: Plantae
- Clade: Tracheophytes
- Clade: Angiosperms
- Clade: Monocots
- Order: Asparagales
- Family: Orchidaceae
- Subfamily: Epidendroideae
- Tribe: Gastrodieae
- Genus: Didymoplexis
- Species: D. pallens

Binomial name
- Didymoplexis pallens Griff.

Synonyms
- Apetalon minutum Wight; Apetalum minutum Dockrill orth. var.; Arethusa bengalensis Hemsl. nom. inval., pro syn.; Arethusa ecristata Griff.; Cheirostylis kanarensis Blatt. & McCann; Didymoplexis pachystomoides (F.Muell.) Garay & W.Kittr.; Didymoplexis palens M.B.Thomas & W.J.McDonald orth. var.; Didymoplexis sylvatica (Blume) Ridl.; Epiphanes pallens (Griff.) Rchb.f.; Gastrodia pallens (Griff.) F.Muell.; Leucanorchis sylvatica Dockrill orth. var.; Leucorchis minuta F.Muell. nom. inval., nom. nud.; Leucorchis sylvatica Blume; Nervilia pachystomoides (F.Muell.) Dockrill; Pogonia pachystomoides F.Muell.

= Didymoplexis pallens =

Crystal bells

Species of orchid

Didymoplexis pallens, commonly known as crystal bells or 双唇兰 (shuang chun lan), is a leafless terrestrial mycotrophic orchid in the family Orchidaceae. It has up to fifteen small, white, pinkish or brownish flowers on a fleshy yellow flowering stem. The flowers open one at a time, remaining open for a short time. Crystal bells is widely distributed in Asia, Southeast Asia, New Guinea, Australia and some Pacific Islands.

== Description ==
Didymoplexis pallens is a leafless, terrestrial mycotrophic herb that has a fleshy rhizome and a fleshy yellow flowering stem 60–250 mm (2–10 in) tall. There are between five and fifteen resupinate white, pinkish or brownish flowers 6–8 mm (0.2–0.3 in) long and 8–10 mm (0.3–0.4 in) wide but only one or two short-lived flowers are open at a time. The flowers are bell-shaped with the sepals and petals similar in size and shape and fused for about half their length. The labellum is wedge-shaped, 6–7 mm (0.2–0.3 in) long and 9–10 mm (0.35–0.39 in) wide with the side curved upwards. There are two or three irregular rows of calli along the midline of the labellum. Plants appear with the first rains of the wet season and flowers from November to March in Australia and from April to May in China.

== Taxonomy and naming ==
Didymoplexis pallens was first described in 1844 by William Griffith from a specimen collected from a bamboo forest near Calcutta and the description was published in the Calcutta Journal of Natural History.

== Distribution and habitat ==
Crystal bells grows in rainforests, grassy forest and bamboo forest China, Taiwan, Afghanistan, Bangladesh, India, Myanmar, Indonesia, Japan, Malaysia, the Philippines, New Guinea, Thailand, Vietnam, Australia including Christmas Island and islands of the southwest Pacific. In Australia it occurs on the Cape York Peninsula as far south as Cardwell, on some Torres Strait Islands, in northern parts of the Northern Territory and in the Kimberley region of Western Australia.

== Conservation ==
Didymoplexis pallens is classified in Western Australia as "Priority One" by the Government of Western Australia Department of Parks and Wildlife, meaning that it is known from only one or a few locations which are potentially at risk.
