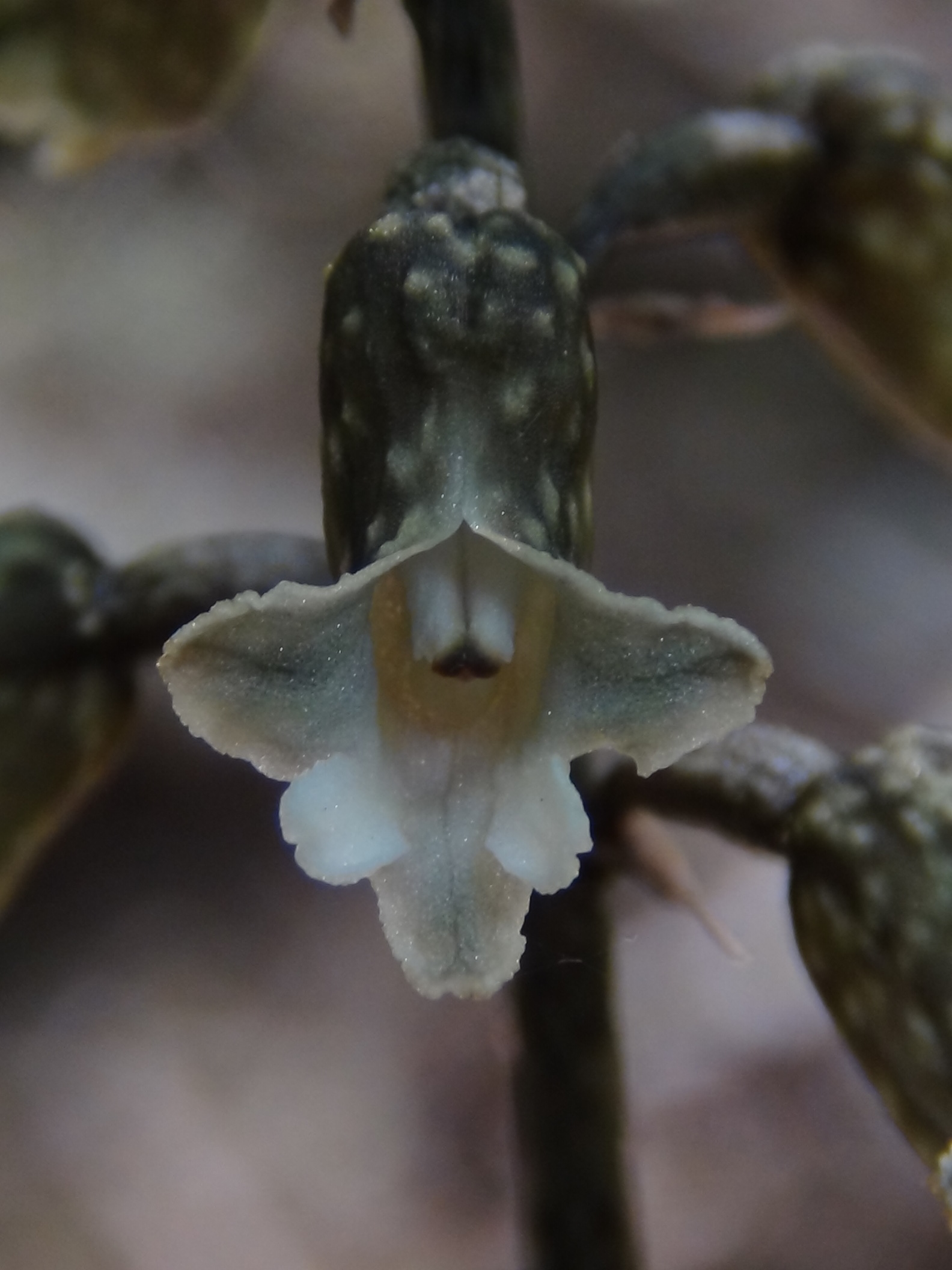

Conservation status
- Nationally Critical (NZ TCS)

Scientific classification
- Kingdom: Plantae
- Clade: Tracheophytes
- Clade: Angiosperms
- Clade: Monocots
- Order: Asparagales
- Family: Orchidaceae
- Subfamily: Epidendroideae
- Tribe: Gastrodieae
- Genus: Gastrodia
- Species: G. cooperae

Binomial name
- Gastrodia cooperae Lehnebach & J.R.Rolfe

= Gastrodia cooperae =

Cooper's black potato orchid

Species of orchid

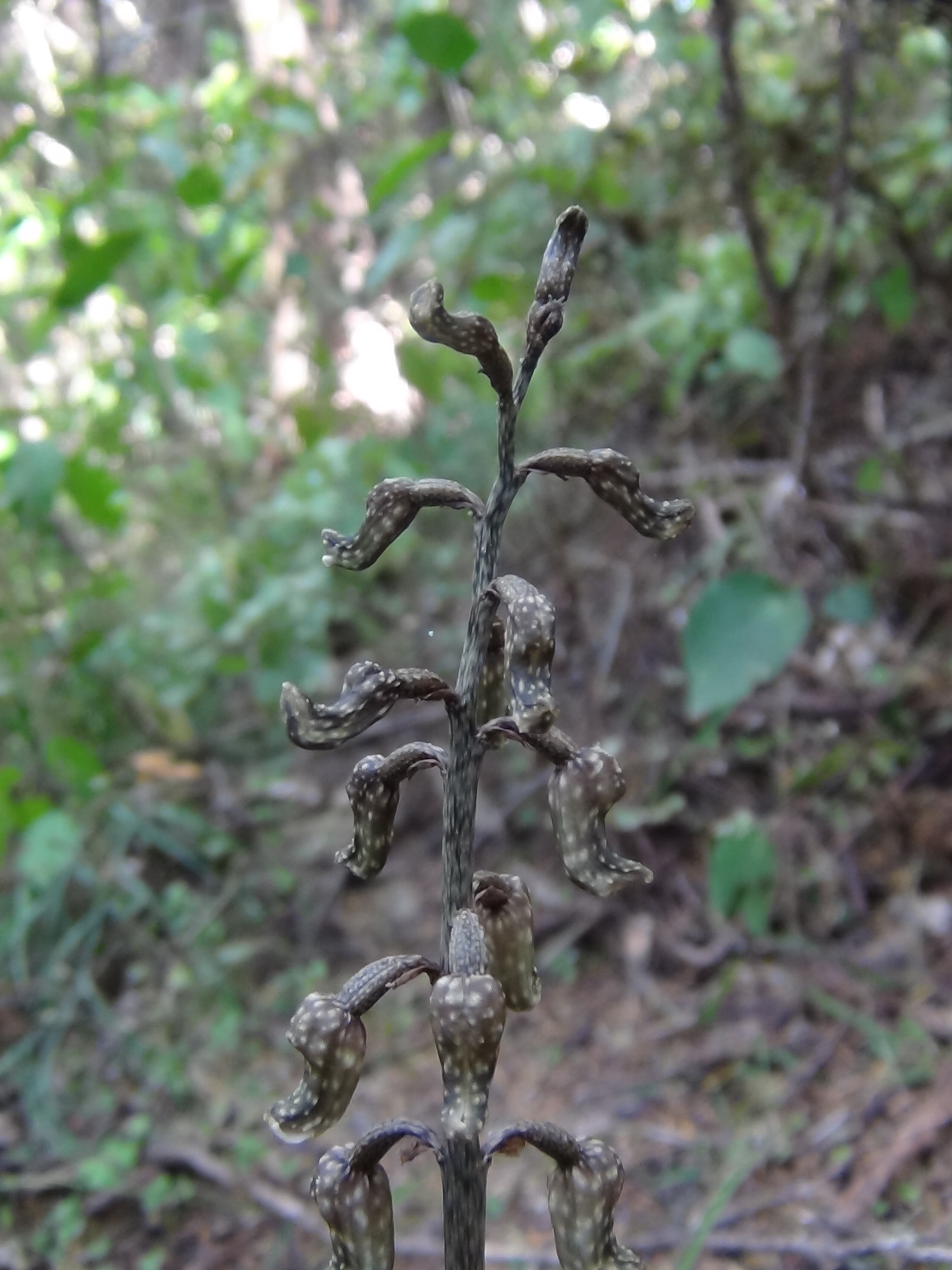

Gastrodia cooperae, also known as Cooper's black potato orchid, is a species of plant in the family Orchidaceae and is endemic to New Zealand. The specific epithet cooperae refers to Dorothy A. Cooper, founder of the New Zealand Native Orchid Group.

Gastrodia cooperae is a parasitic orchid; it produces no chlorophyll.

The plant is listed as 'Threatened - Nationally Critical' by the New Zealand Plant Conservation Network. There are only three known sites where it grows, and it is believed that fewer than 250 mature specimens are living today.
