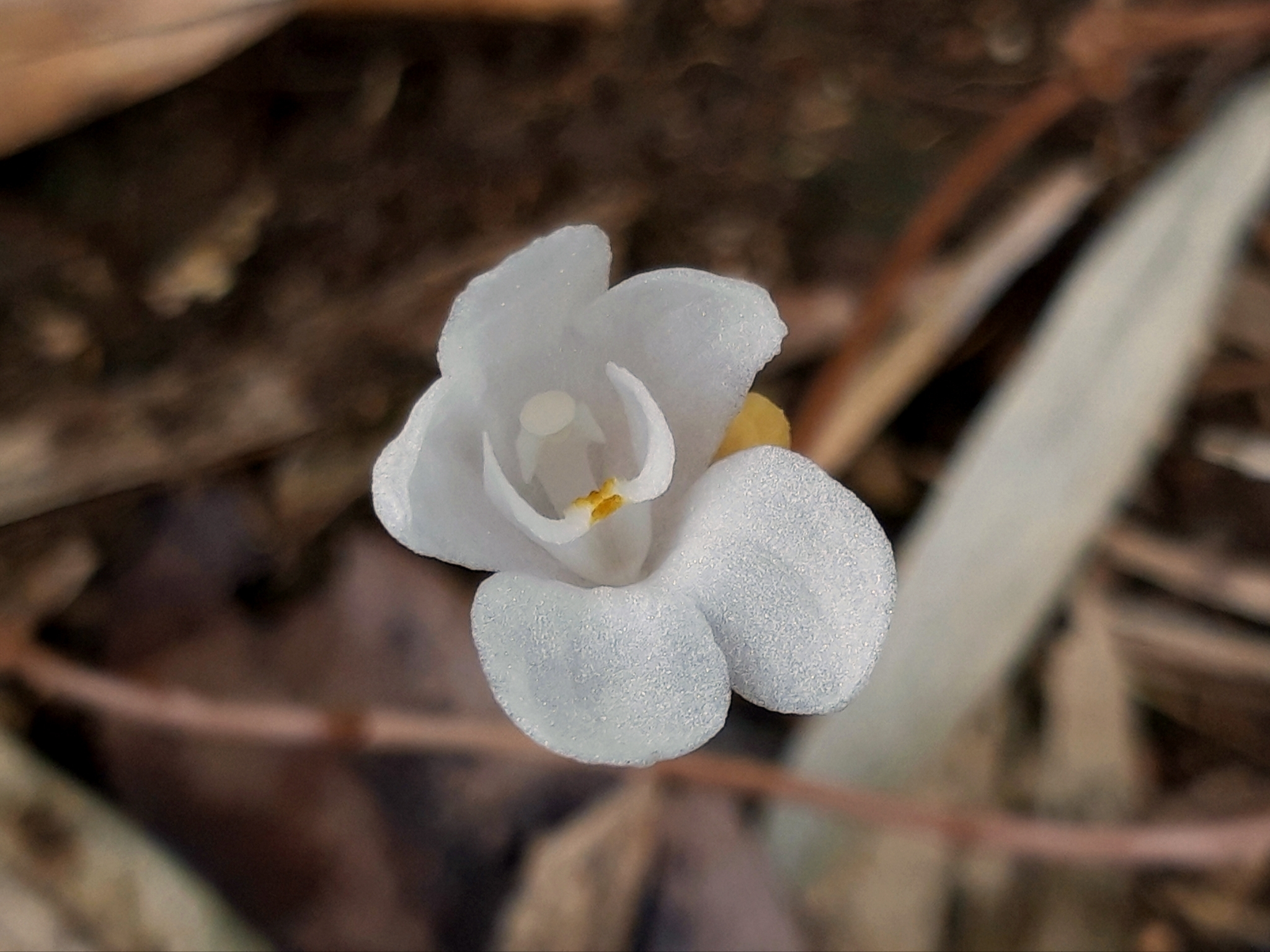
- Didymoplexis pallens

Scientific classification
- Kingdom: Plantae
- Clade: Tracheophytes
- Clade: Angiosperms
- Clade: Monocots
- Order: Asparagales
- Family: Orchidaceae
- Subfamily: Epidendroideae
- Tribe: Gastrodieae
- Genus: Didymoplexis; Griff.

Synonyms
- Apetalon Wight; Epiphanes Rchb.f. nom. illeg.; Leucorchis Blume nom. illeg.

= Didymoplexis =

Crystal orchids

Genus of plants

Didymoplexis, commonly known as crystal orchids (Chinese: 双唇兰属, romanised: shuang chun lan shu), is a genus of terrestrial leafless orchids in the family Orchidaceae, about twenty species of which have been described. Orchids in this genus have swollen, fleshy rhizomes and thin, pale, upright fleshy flowering stems with resupinate, bell-shaped white or pale yellowish brown flowers. They are native to Africa, Madagascar, Southeast Asia, Australia and various islands of the Pacific.

== Description ==
Orchids in the genus Didymoplexis are small, leafless, terrestrial, mycotrophic herbs with a swollen, fleshy rhizome. The flowering stem is thin, upright and fleshy with a few scale-like bracts fleshy and one to a few flowers. The flowers are resupinate, white or pale yellowish brown and often last for less than a day. The sepals and petals are joined at the base to form a short, bell-shaped tube with the tips spreading widely. The labellum is relatively broad and has a band of calli along its midline.

== Taxonomy and naming ==
The genus Didymoplexis was first formally described in 1843 by William Griffith and the description was published in the Calcutta Journal of Natural History. The name Didymoplexis is derived from the Ancient Greek didymos meaning "double" or "twin" and plexis meaning "twine", "twist" or "weave" referring to the interlocking calli on the labellum.

== List of species ==
The following is a list of species of Didymoplexis recognised by the Plants of the World Online as at October 2025:

- Didymoplexis africana Summerh. - Ghana, Ivory Coast, Congo-Brazzaville, Congo-Kinshasa, Tanzania
- Didymoplexis avaratraensis Summerh.
- Didymoplexis cornuta P.J.Cribb - Java, Borneo
  - Didymoplexis cornuta var. betungkerihunensis Tsukaya & H.Okada
  - Didymoplexis cornuta var. cornuta
  - ''Didymoplexis cornuta var. maliauensis Tsukaya, Suleiman & H.Okada
- Didymoplexis flexipes J.J.Sm. - Java
- Didymoplexis gibbosa Aver. & Nuraliev
- Didymoplexis himalaica Schltr. - Assam, Bhutan
- Didymoplexis holochelia Aver. & Nuraliev
- Didymoplexis latilabris Schltr. - Kalimantan
- Didymoplexis micradenia (Rchb.f.) Hemsl. - Taiwan, Vietnam, Java, Maluku, New Guinea, Solomons, Fiji, Niue, New Caledonia, Samoa, Tonga, Samoa, Wallis & Futuna, Micronesia
- Didymoplexis obreniformis J.J.Sm. - Java
  - Didymoplexis obreniformis var. maliauensis Suetsugu, Suleiman & Tsukaya
  - Didymoplexis obreniformis var. obreniformis
- Didymoplexis pachystomoides (F.Muell.) Garay & W.Kittr. - Queensland
- Didymoplexis pallens Griff. - Asia, Southeast Asia, Australia and some Pacific and Indian Ocean islands
- Didymoplexis recurvata P.J.Cribb - Philippines
- Didymoplexis seidenfadenii C.S.Kumar & Ormerod - Kerala
- Didymoplexis sirichaii Suddee
- Didymoplexis stella-silvae Hermans]
- Didymoplexis striata J.J.Sm. - Java, Borneo
- Didymoplexis torricellensis Schltr. - New Guinea
- Didymoplexis trukensis Tuyama - Micronesia
- Didymoplexis verrucosa J.Stewart & Hennessy - KwaZulu-Natal, Madagascar
- Didymoplexis vietnamica Ormerod - Guangxi, Vietnam

== Distribution and habitat ==
Crystal orchids grow in grassy forest, bamboo thickets and rainforest in India, southern China and Indochina to southern Japan and the Philippines, throughout the Malay Archipelago to New Guinea, Christmas Island, tropical Australia, and the southwest Pacific islands. Some also occur in South West Africa and Madagascar.
