= Deborah Lambkin =

Irish botanical artist

Personal details
- Born: Ireland

Deborah Lambkin is an Irish botanical artist who has been the official Orchid artist for the Royal Horticultural Society.

== Career ==
Deborah Lambkin trained in the National College of Art and Design. She spent a number of years living in Dublin and working as an artist. She worked for a graphic design firm which she left in 1998 to focus on her own art. She then moved to London where she began working for the Royal Horticultural Society's Orchid committee in 2005 as the official artist. She has been commissioned to create the art for a number of magazines including Curtis's Botanical Magazine, books and exhibitions.

She is one of the few Irish artists to win a gold medal at the RHS exhibition, others include Wendy F. Walsh and Susan Sex. Her work is on display in the National Trust.

Lambkin was awarded the 2020 Margaret Flockton Award (awarded annually by the Royal Botanic Garden, Sydney) "for excellence in scientific botanical illustration") for her illustration of the new orchid species Gastrodia agnicellus which was named partly in her honour: "the species refers to the woolly covering on the rhizome, the ear-like petals and also alludes to the name of the botanical artist who brought the new species to life in her drawing." Latin agnicellus means "little lamb" or "lambkin".

== Awards, Exhibitions and books ==
- 1998 RHS Grenfell Silver medal.
- 1999 gold medal for her collection of eight paintings of nerines at the February's Winter Series Exhibition at the Royal Horticultural Society in London.
- 2014 World Orchid Conference Botanical Art Exhibition
- 2002. E. C. Nelson et alii The virtues of herbs of Master Jon Gardener. Dublin: Strawberry Tree.
- 2019 The Jill Smythies Award from the Linnean Society
- 2020 Margaret Flockton Award for "excellence in scientific botanical illustration"
