= Gastrodia lacista =

Western potato orchid

Scientific classification
- Kingdom: Plantae
- Clade: Tracheophytes
- Clade: Angiosperms
- Clade: Monocots
- Order: Asparagales
- Family: Orchidaceae
- Subfamily: Epidendroideae
- Tribe: Gastrodieae
- Genus: Gastrodia
- Species: G. lacista

Binomial name
- Gastrodia lacista D.L.Jones

Species of orchid

Gastrodia lacista, commonly known as the western potato orchid, is a leafless terrestrial mycotrophic orchid in the family Orchidaceae. It has a thin brown flowering stem with up to fifty small, drooping, fawn and white, tube-shaped flowers. It grows in forest and woodland in the south-west of Western Australia.

== Description ==
Gastrodia lacista is a leafless terrestrial, mycotrophic herb that has a thin, brown crook-like flowering stem bearing between five and fifty drooping, fawn and white, tube-shaped flowers that are warty outside and white inside. The sepals and petals are joined, forming a tube 10–12 mm (0.4–0.5 in) long. The petals have a few blunt teeth on the edges. The labellum is 9–10 mm (0.4–0.4 in) long, 4–5 mm (0.16–0.20 in) wide and white with irregular edges. Flowering occurs from November to January.

== Taxonomy and naming ==
Gastrodia lacista was first formally described in 1991 by David Jones from a specimen collected near Albany in 1989. The description was published in Australian Orchid Research. The specific epithet (lacista) is a Latin word meaning "torn" referring to the edges of the labellum.

== Distribution and habitat ==
The western potato orchid grows in woodland and forest in leaf litter between Bunbury and Albany.
