= Didymoplexiopsis =

Scientific classification
- Kingdom: Plantae
- Clade: Tracheophytes
- Clade: Angiosperms
- Clade: Monocots
- Order: Asparagales
- Family: Orchidaceae
- Subfamily: Epidendroideae
- Tribe: Gastrodieae
- Genus: Didymoplexiopsis; Seidenf.
- Species: D. khiriwongensis

Binomial name
- Didymoplexiopsis khiriwongensis Seidenf.

Synonyms
- Didymoplexis khiriwongensis (Seidenf.) Suetsugu & T.C.Hsu; Didymoplexiella hainanensis X.H.Jin & S.C.Chen

Genus of orchids

Didymoplexiopsis is a genus of plants in the family Orchidaceae. The genus contains only one species, Didymoplexiopsis khiriwongensis, native to Hainan, Vietnam, Laos and Thailand.
