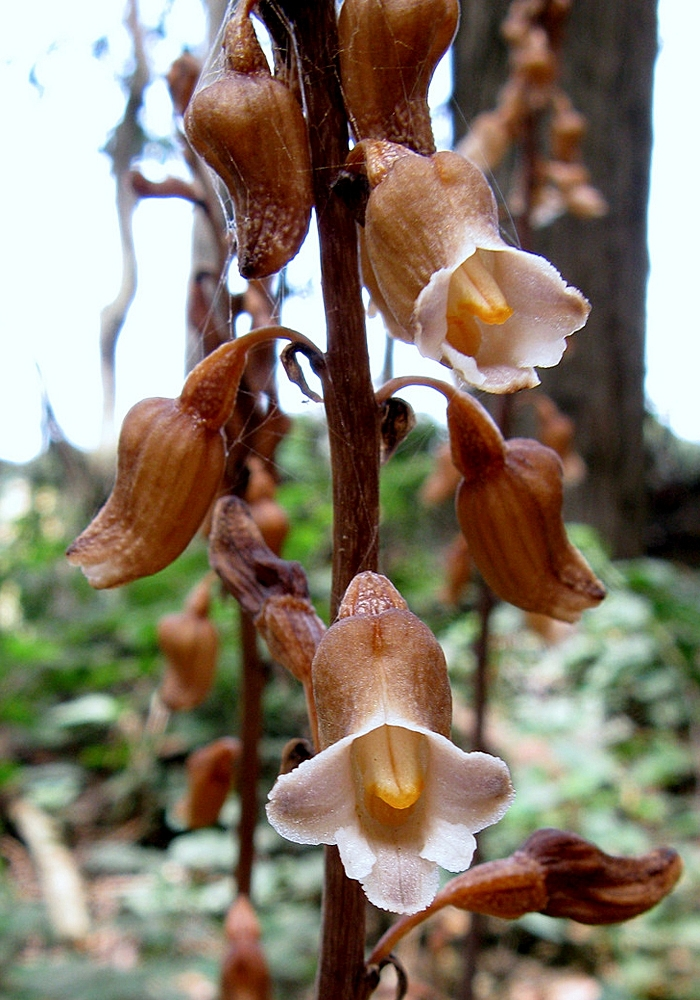

Scientific classification
- Kingdom: Plantae
- Clade: Tracheophytes
- Clade: Angiosperms
- Clade: Monocots
- Order: Asparagales
- Family: Orchidaceae
- Subfamily: Epidendroideae
- Tribe: Gastrodieae
- Genus: Gastrodia
- Species: G. procera

Binomial name
- Gastrodia procera G.W.Carr

Synonyms
- Gastrodia entomogama D.L.Jones; Gastrodia sp. aff. sesamoides

= Gastrodia procera =

Tall potato orchid

Species of orchid

Gastrodia procera, commonly known as tall potato orchid, is a leafless terrestrial mycotrophic orchid in the family Orchidaceae. It has a robust, dark brown to blackish flowering stem with up to seventy cinnamon brown, tube-shaped flowers that are white inside. It grows in high rainfall forest in southeastern Australia.

== Description ==
Gastrodia procera is a leafless terrestrial, mycotrophic herb that has a robust, dark brown to blackish flowering stem 60–120 cm (20–50 in) tall bearing between five and seventy cinnamon brown, tube-shaped flowers that are warty outside and white inside. The sepals and petals are joined, forming a tube 10–12 mm (0.4–0.5 in) long. The petals have wavy edges. The labellum is 14–17 mm (0.6–0.7 in) long, 5–8 mm (0.20–0.31 in) wide and white with orange-coloured edges. Flowering occurs from December to January and flowering is enhanced by fire the previous summer.

== Taxonomy and naming ==
Gastrodia procera was first formally described in 1991 by Geoffrey William Carr from a specimen collected in the Dandenong Ranges near Albany in 1958. The description was published in the Indigenous Flora and Fauna Association Miscellaneous Paper. The specific epithet (procera) is a Latin word meaning "tall", "slender" or "long".

== Distribution and habitat ==
Tall potato orchid is widespread and common in high rainfall forest south from the Barrington Tops in New South Wales, through the Australian Capital Territory and southeastern Victoria to Tasmania.
