= Della Purves =

British botanical artist (1945–2008)

- Born: 6 July 1945; Paisley, United Kingdom
- Died: 17 January 2008 (aged 62); Edinburgh, United Kingdom
- Occupation: Botanical artist
- Known for: Botanical Illustration

Rodella Anne Purves (6 July 1945 – 17 January 2008) was a British botanical artist.

Purves was born in 1945 in Paisley, Scotland, and two years later moved to Edinburgh with her family, where she attended St. Margaret's School. She received a degree in agriculture from Edinburgh and East of Scotland College of Agriculture. She trained at Cambridge as a seed tester.

She spent a year in New Zealand, working for the government's Department of Industry, before returning to Edinburgh to work at the Royal Botanic Garden.

Purves left the Botanic Garden in 1976 to concentrate on her career as a botanical artist. Her work was exhibited around the world, in the United States, Ireland, Japan and Germany, with the Queen's Royal Botanist describing her as one of Britain's leading artists. She was awarded the Jill Smythies Award in 1998.

Purves died on 17 January 2008 in Edinburgh, Scotland.
