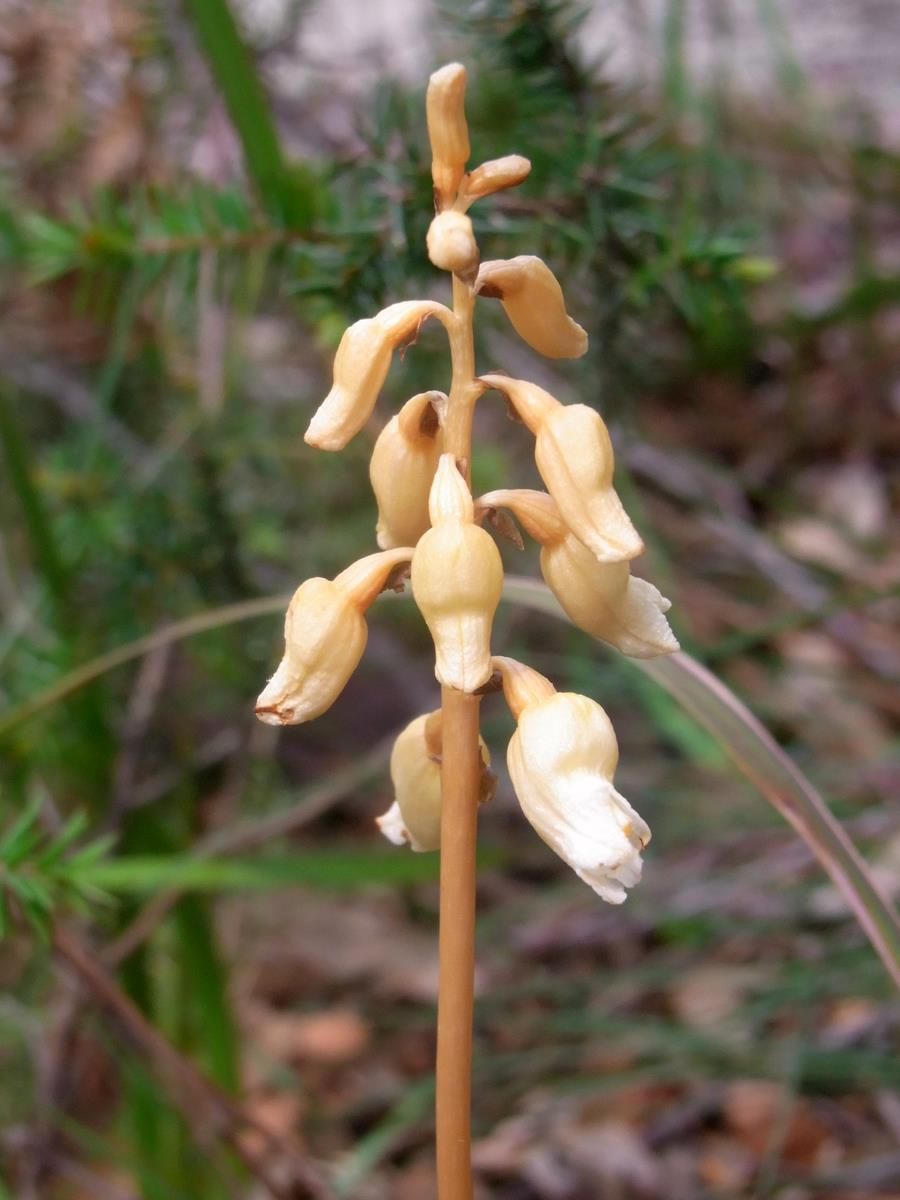
- In Ku-ring-gai Chase National Park

Scientific classification
- Kingdom: Plantae
- Clade: Tracheophytes
- Clade: Angiosperms
- Clade: Monocots
- Order: Asparagales
- Family: Orchidaceae
- Subfamily: Epidendroideae
- Tribe: Gastrodieae
- Genus: Gastrodia
- Species: G. sesamoides

Binomial name
- Gastrodia sesamoides R.Br.

= Gastrodia sesamoides =

Cinnamon bells

Species of orchid

Gastrodia sesamoides, commonly known as cinnamon bells or common potato orchid in Australia and as the pot-bellied orchid or cinnamon sticks in New Zealand, is a leafless, terrestrial saprophytic orchid in the family Orchidaceae. It has a thin, fleshy brown flowering stem and up to twenty five drooping, brownish, self-pollinating flowers that are white inside. Growing in a wide range of habitats, it is native to Australia and New Zealand.

== Description ==
Gastrodia sesamoides is a leafless, terrestrial saprophyte with an underground rhizome up to 80 mm (3 in) long and 30 mm (1 in) in diameter. The thin, fleshy brown flowering stem is 12–75 cm (5–30 in) tall with between three and six bracts 4–10 mm (0.2–0.4 in) long and between three and twenty five flowers. The flowers are cinnamon brown to greyish brown and often rough on the outside, white inside with the sepals and petals joined to form a bell-shaped tube 15–20 mm (0.6–0.8 in) long. Each flower has a pedicel or "stalk" 2–10 mm (0.08–0.4 in) long and a cone-shaped ovary with the narrower end towards the base. The flowers often produce an appealing cinnamon-like scent. Flowering occurs from September to January in Australia and from August to May in New Zealand, but the flowers are self-pollinating. Flowering is enhanced by fire the previous summer.

== Taxonomy and naming ==
Gastrodia sesamoides was first formally described in 1810 by Robert Brown and the description was published in his book Prodromus Florae Novae Hollandiae. The specific epithet (sesamoides) refers to a supposed similarity to the sesame plant, the ending -oides being a Latin suffix meaning "like", "resembling" or "having the form of".

== Distribution and habitat ==
Cinnamon bells is widespread and common, occurring south from the Darling Downs through the eastern half of New South Wales and the southern half of Victoria to Tasmania. It used to be found in the Sydney region but is now considered rare or extinct in that area. It is only found in the far southeast of South Australia, including on Kangaroo Island. It occurs on both the North and South Islands of New Zealand although only in the Marlborough and Nelson areas of the South Island. It grows in a wide variety of habitats, including forest and coastal scrub from lowland areas to subalpine habitats as long as there is adequate rainfall or soil moisture. In New Zealand it is often found in forestry plantations and in gardens where pine bark mulch is used.

== Ecology ==
Because the potato orchid does not produce chlorophyll it is unable to make its own food via photosynthesis. Alternatively, it has a complex relationship with a fungus. The orchid receives its nutrients from the fungus, and the fungus obtains its habitat from the orchid and minerals and sugars from the roots of other forest trees.

Gastrodia sesamoides has been introduced to and is naturalised in South Africa.

== Conservation ==
This orchid is common and widespread throughout most of its range but is classed as "rare" in South Australia.

== Uses ==
=== Use as food ===
Indigenous Australians ate the roasted tubers of this orchid and it may have been one of the principal plants used by Tasmanian Aborigines. An early Victorian settler reported that Aboriginal peoples located the plants in habitat by observing where bandicoots had scratched in search of the tubers after detecting the plants underground by scent. The flavour of the tuber is said to resemble that of the beetroot, though insipid and watery.

=== Use in horticulture ===
Cultivation of Gastrodia sesamoides has yet to be achieved. However, the cultivation of other Gastrodia species has been achieved, and methods used to cultivate those species could be used to cultivate Gastrodia sesamoides in the future.

== See also ==
- Bush tucker
- Neglected and underutilized crop

Other orchids used as food:

- Salep
- Orchis mascula
- Orchis militaris
- Vanilla
