= Uleiorchis =

Scientific classification
- Kingdom: Plantae
- Clade: Tracheophytes
- Clade: Angiosperms
- Clade: Monocots
- Order: Asparagales
- Family: Orchidaceae
- Subfamily: Epidendroideae
- Tribe: Gastrodieae
- Genus: Uleiorchis; Hoehne

Genus of orchids

Uleiorchis is a genus of myco-heterotrophic flowering plants from the orchid family, Orchidaceae. There are two known species, native to Central and South America.

- Uleiorchis liesneri Carnevali & I.Ramírez - Venezuela
- Uleiorchis ulei (Cogn.) Handro - Costa Rica, Honduras, Panama, Colombia, Venezuela, Guyana, French Guiana, Brazil, Peru, possibly Ecuador

== See also ==
- List of Orchidaceae genera
