= Didymoplexiella =

Scientific classification
- Kingdom: Plantae
- Clade: Tracheophytes
- Clade: Angiosperms
- Clade: Monocots
- Order: Asparagales
- Family: Orchidaceae
- Subfamily: Epidendroideae
- Tribe: Gastrodieae
- Genus: Didymoplexiella; Garay

Genus of orchids

Didymoplexiella is a genus of flowering plants from the orchid family, Orchidaceae. It contains 8 known species native to Southeast Asia, with a few species extending northwards into Japan and southern China. These are mycoheterotrophic plants lacking chlorophyll, obtaining nutrients from fungi in the soil.

- Didymoplexiella borneensis (Schltr.) Garay - Sarawak
- Didymoplexiella cinnabarina Tsukaya, M.Nakajima & H.Okada - Kalimantan
- Didymoplexiella denticulata Aver. - Laos, Vietnam
- Didymoplexiella forcipata (J.J.Sm.) Garay - Kalimantan
- Didymoplexiella kinabaluensis (Carr) Seidenf. - Sabah
- Didymoplexiella ornata (Ridl.) Garay - Thailand, Vietnam, Malaysia, Borneo, Sumatra
- Didymoplexiella siamensis (Rolfe ex Downie) Seidenf. - Hainan, Taiwan, Japan（Ryukyu Islands）, Thailand, Vietnam
- Didymoplexiella trichechus (J.J.Sm.) Garay - Sumatra, Bangka

== See also ==
- List of Orchidaceae genera
