= Auxopus =

Scientific classification
- Kingdom: Plantae
- Clade: Tracheophytes
- Clade: Angiosperms
- Clade: Monocots
- Order: Asparagales
- Family: Orchidaceae
- Subfamily: Epidendroideae
- Tribe: Gastrodieae
- Genus: Auxopus; Schltr.

Type species
- Auxopus kamerunensis Schltr.

Genus of orchids

Auxopus is a genus of the family Orchidaceae. It belongs to the tribe Gastrodieae.

Little is known about the flower structure of members of Gastrodieae, which are saprophytic. Auxopus are leafless and contain inflorescences of flowers with their sepals and petals united.

Auxopus has 4 known species, native to tropical Africa and Madagascar.

- Auxopus kamerunensis Schltr. - Ghana, Guinea, Ivory Coast, Liberia, Nigeria, Central African Republic, Cameroon, Gabon
- Auxopus letouzeyi Szlach. - Cameroon
- Auxopus macranthus Summerh. - Ghana, Ivory Coast, Nigeria, Cameroon, Uganda, Democratic Republic of the Congo
- Auxopus madagascariensis Schltr. - Madagascar
