= Claire Dalby =

British artist (born 1944)

- Born: 20 November 1944 (age 81); St Andrews, Scotland
- Education: City and Guilds of London Art School
- Known for: Flower painting, book illustration, wood engraving

Joy Claire Allison Dalby (born 20 November 1944) is a British painter, engraver and book illustrator who mainly depicts botanical subjects through watercolour, gouache and wood.

== Biography ==
Dalby, whose father was the respected watercolour painter Charles Longbotham, was born at St Andrews in Scotland. She attended the Haberdashers' Aske's School for Girls at Acton in West London from 1955 to 1963. She studied art, specialising in engraving and calligraphy, at the City and Guilds of London Art School from 1964 to 1967. She sought advice on the techniques of wood engraving from Joan Hassall.

In 1966 Dalby had her first picture exhibited at the Royal Academy in London. That year she was awarded a David Murray landscape studentship and spent time at Flatford Mill in Suffolk, where she met the botanist Kery Dalby; they married in 1967. She exhibited at the Clarges Gallery in 1968 and in 1972. A number of solo exhibitions followed including at Camberley in Surrey during 1975, at Halifax House in Oxford in 1987 and at the Consort Gallery of Imperial College in 1981 and 1988. A solo exhibition at the Shetland Museum in Lerwick came later that year. She participated in a number of group shows including exhibitions organised by the Society of Wood Engravers, the Royal Watercolour Society and the Royal Society of Painter-Etchers and Engravers.

Claire Dalby has provided botanical illustrations for a number of books and created two wallcharts, illustrating over 500 different species of lichens, for the Natural History Museum. In 1989 a collection of her botanical illustrations was published as Claire Dalby's Picture Book. In 1994 the Linnean Society awarded her its Jill Smythies Award for outstanding botanical illustrations and in 1995 she was awarded a gold medal by the Royal Horticultural Society. Works by Dalby are held in a number of British museums including the Natural History Museum, the Science Museum, the Victoria and Albert Museum and the Ashmolean Museum in Oxford. The Royal Collection, the Fitzwilliam Museum and the National Library of Wales also hold examples as do the Hunt Institute and the Australian Biological Resources Study Centre in Canberra.

=== Selected books ===
- The Observer's Book of Lichens by Kenneth Leonard Alvin, 1s edition 1963; 2nd edition 1977 ISBN 0723215669
- The Family Water Naturalist by Heather Angel & Pat Wolseley, Joseph, 1982. ISBN 0718119126
- Women Engravers by Patricia Jaffe, 1988. ISBN 0860682250
- Even the Flowers by Freda Downie, Gruffyground Press, 1989, with an engraved frontispiece by Dalby
- Claire Dalby's Picture Book, 1989. OL 19119506M ASIN B0081B75S0
- Colour Identification Guide to Grasses, Sedges and Ferns by Francis Rose, 1991. ISBN 0-670-80688-9
- Crucifers of Great Britain and Northern Ireland by T.C.G. Rich, 1991. ISBN 9780901158208
- Flora of Australia, Volume 54, 1992.
- Images from Nature, Natural History Museum, 1998. 2004 pbk edition ISBN 0565090291

== Memberships ==
Dalby is a member of or affiliated with the following organisations;-

- 1973 Elected associate of the Royal Watercolour Society
- 1977 Elected full member of the Royal Watercolour Society
- 1978 Elected associate of Royal Society of Painter-Etchers and Engravers.
- 1982 Elected full member of Royal Society of Painter-Etchers and Engravers.
- 1991 Vice-president of the Royal Watercolour Society.

Dalby is also a member of the Society of Wood Engravers.
