= Dorothy G. Downie =

Scottish botanist and forester

- Born: 16 September 1894; Edinburgh
- Died: 22 August 1960 (aged 65)
- Scientific career
- Fields: Botany
- Author abbrev. (botany): Downie

Dorothy G. Downie (16 September 1894 – 22 August 1960) was a Scottish botanist and forester. She is known for her research on the fungal symbionts and nutritional requirements of orchids. She was the first woman to graduate in forestry at the University of Edinburgh.

== Biography ==
Dorothy G. Downie was born in 1894 in Edinburgh. She graduated from the University of Edinburgh in 1917 with a B.S. in science and in 1919 with a B.S. in forestry. She was the first woman to receive a degree in forestry from the University of Edinburgh. From 1919 to 1920, she studied at Moray House Training College, where she qualified in professional training for teachers. From 1920 to 1925 she worked at the University of Aberdeen as an assistant to William Grant Craib, who was the Regis Chair of Botany.

In 1925, she received a Carnegie scholarship and became a graduate student at the University of Chicago. There, she received in 1928 a PhD in botany with a dissertation on the morphology of the male gametophyte of Microcycas calocoma. In 1927, she went to Cuba, where she collected cycads by riding on horseback through the Cordillera de Guaniguanico.

Downie was invited back to the University of Aberdeen in 1928, and worked as an assistant from 1928 to 1929, a lecturer from 1929 to 1949, and a reader from 1949 to 1960. Unfortunately her dedication to teaching and to building up an extensive slide collection led to her abandonment of cycad research for some years. Her research focused on nutrition in orchids, and she published about germination in Goodyera repens, showing that the fungal symbiont was a prerequisite for orchid germination. Downie was also a leader of the Strathcona Club at Bucksburn, where she was resident. In 1960, she retired due to a progressive disease and died in August of that year.

== Selected publications ==
- Downie, DG (1925). "Contributions to the flora of Siam: Additamentum XVI". Kew Bulletin. 1925 (9): 367–394. doi:10.2307/4107477. ISSN 0075-5982. JSTOR 4107477.
- Downie, D.G. (1925). "Contributions to the flora of Siam: Additamentum XVII". Kew Bulletin. 1925 (10): 402–423. doi:10.2307/4115102. JSTOR 4115102.
- Downie, DG (1928). "Male Gametophyte of the Microcycas calocoma". Botanical Gazette. 85 (4): 437–450. doi:10.1086/333855. ISSN 0006-8071. S2CID 83650234.
- Downie, DG (1943). "Notes on the germination of Corallorhiza innata". Transactions of the Botanical Society of Edinburgh. 33 (4). Taylor & Francis Group: 380–382. doi:10.1080/13594864309441391.
