= Johan Hermans =

British botanist (born 1956)

Johan Hermans (born 1956) is a British botanist specialising in orchids, and an Honorary Research Associate of Royal Botanic Gardens, Kew. His The Orchids of Madagascar, described as "a now classic work", was published in a second edition in 2007.

The species Gastrodia agnicellus, which he described in 2020, has been called "the ugliest orchid in the world" and named by Kew as one of the "Top 10 species new to science in 2020".

The standard author abbreviation Hermans is used to indicate this person as the author when citing a botanical name.

== Selected publications ==
- Hermans, Johan; Hermans, Clare (2007). The orchids of Madagascar (2nd ed.). Kew: Royal Botanic Gardens. ISBN 9781842461334.
