= Nina Jones =

New Zealand artist and botanical illustrator (1871–1926)

- Born: Nina Lucy Mary Jones; 22 June 1871; Christchurch, New Zealand
- Died: 8 February 1926 (aged 54); Nelson, New Zealand
- Known for: Botanical paintings
- Style: Watercolour

Nina Lucy Mary Jones (22 June 1871 – 8 February 1926) was a New Zealand artist and botanical illustrator.

== Biography ==
Nina Jones was born in the Christchurch suburb of St Martins to Eliza and Charles Jones, before moving to Nelson with her parents where she remained for the rest of her life. She was a water colourist who primarily painted landscapes and botanical paintings, and exhibited widely at New Zealand's local Art Society's exhibitions. For a time she also worked with metal and had examples of her work exhibited in a show held in Christchurch to celebrate Queen Victoria's jubilee. Botanists from around New Zealand sent her samples to paint, a newspaper article of the time stated, "The amount of careful labour, the trueness of colour and regard to the habits of these bush flowers as well as the artistic perception of the artist must speak to all lovers of New Zealand native flora."

Jones was involved in the arts both locally and nationally. She was involved in the Suter Arts Society since its inception in 1899. This was previously known as the Bishopdale Sketching Club of which she was also a member and secretary (1899–1925). Jones was involved in the National Arts Society as the Nelson vice president.

Jones was requested by the New Zealand Government to submit 30 of her paintings of native flowers and fruits to be exhibited at the British Empire Exhibition at Wembley in 1924–25.

Jones exhibited at Canterbury Society of Arts and New Zealand Academy of Fine Arts.

== Death ==
Jones died on 8 February 1926 at her home in Franklyn Rise, Nelson, and was buried in Richmond Cemetery on 9 February 1926. After her death, Jones's works were left in trust to the people of Nelson and they are now held in the Nelson Provincial Museum.

== Legacy ==
An exhibition celebrating her career as an artist was held at the Suter Gallery in October 1926 and showed nearly 250 of her paintings. A review of the exhibition stated, "The exhibition was of a much more extensive and comprehensive nature than most folks anticipated. The fine artistic touch, noticeable in every picture shown, was greatly admired. The collection is unique and the artist's work is destined to be of much value for all time to come."

== Gallery ==
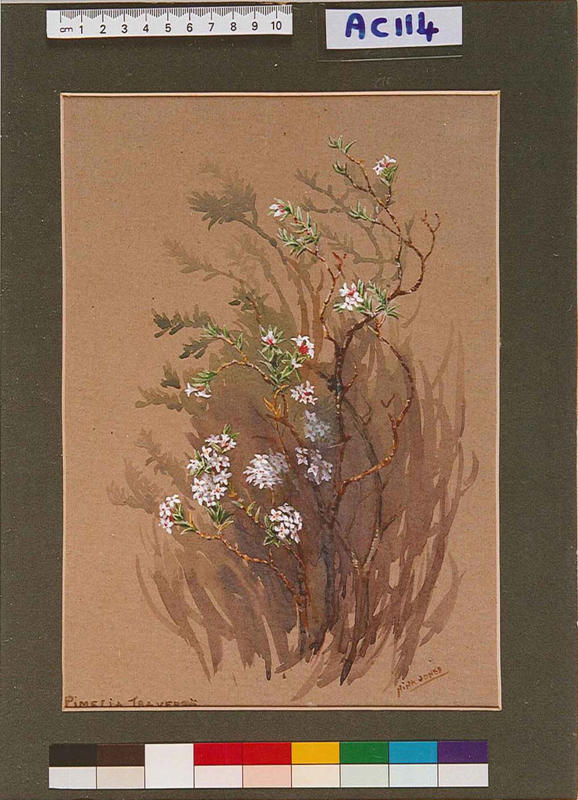
Pimelea

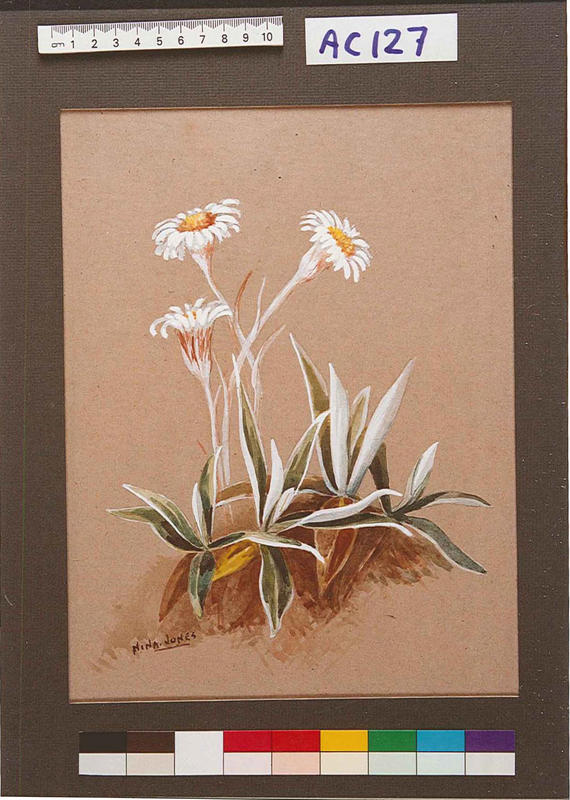
Olearia insignis

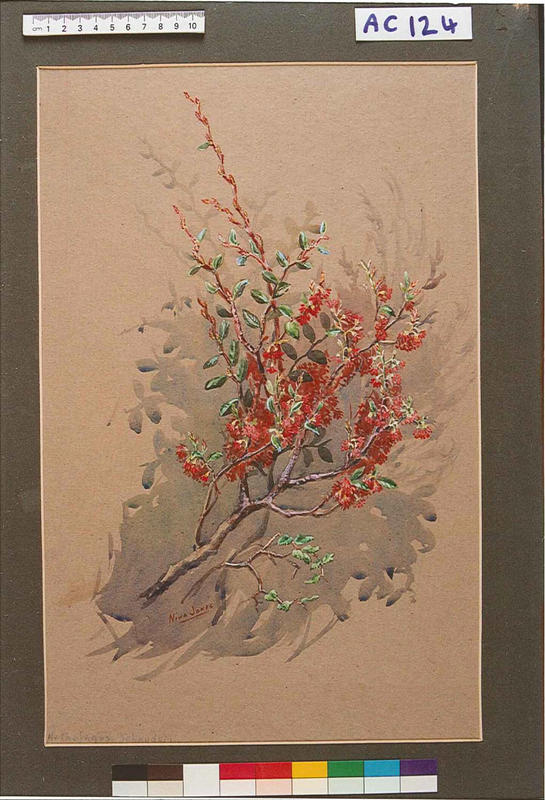
Nothofagus solanderi

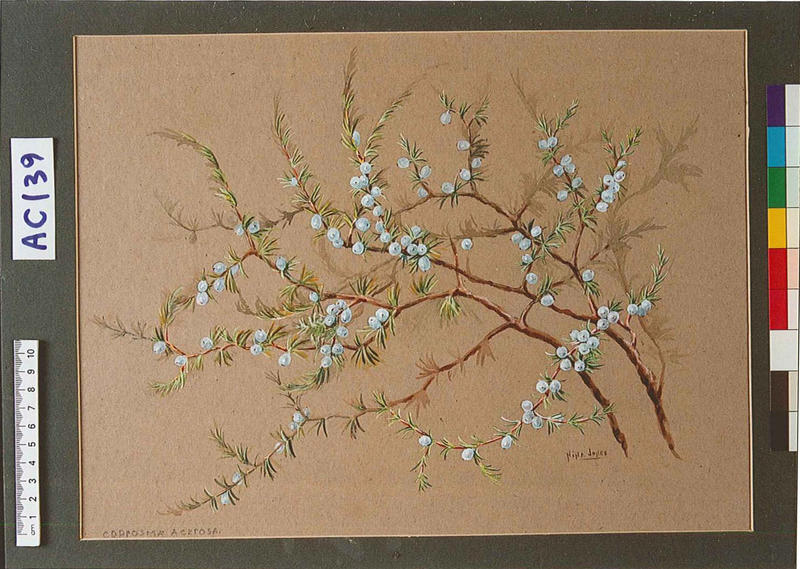
Coprosma acerosa

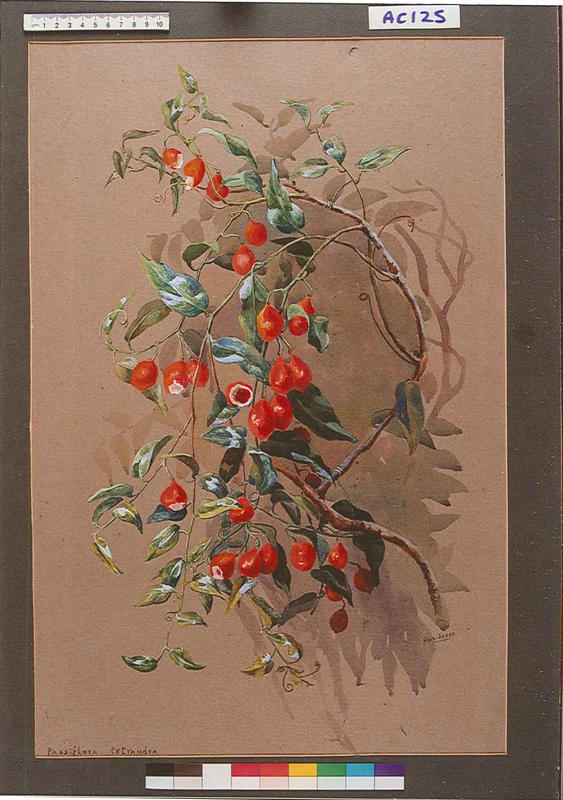
Passiflora tetrandra

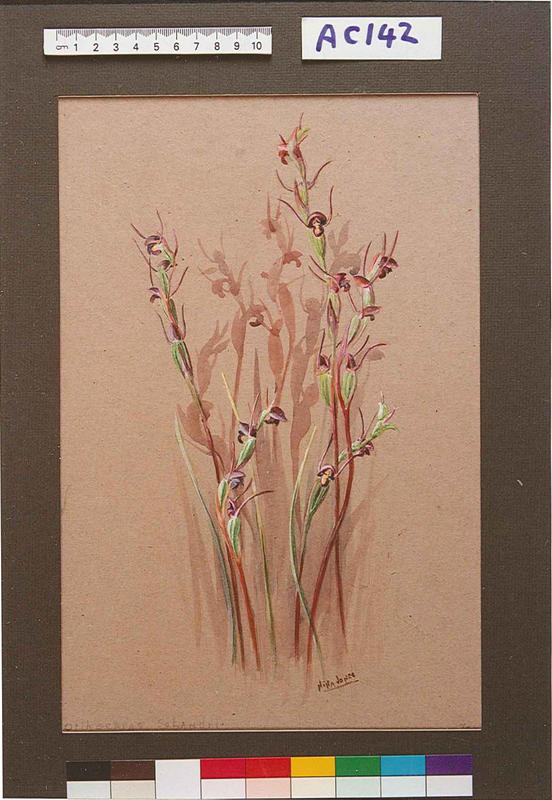
Orthoceras solandri
