= Gastrodia javanica =

Scientific classification
- Kingdom: Plantae
- Clade: Tracheophytes
- Clade: Angiosperms
- Clade: Monocots
- Order: Asparagales
- Family: Orchidaceae
- Subfamily: Epidendroideae
- Tribe: Gastrodieae
- Genus: Gastrodia
- Species: G. javanica

Binomial name
- Gastrodia javanica (Blume, 1840)

Synonyms
- Epiphanes javanica Blume; Gastrodia hasseltii Blume; Gastrodia javanica f. thalassina Yokota; Gastrodia lutea Fukuy.; Gastrodia malayana Ridl.; Gastrodia stapfii Hayata

Species of orchid

Gastrodia javanica, or Javanese chijian (Japanese: 爪哇赤箭), is an epiparasitic species of orchid native to Singapore, the Philippines, Indonesia, Malaysia, and Thailand. The species normally grows to a height of 20 to 80 centimeters, and has pale yellow or green-yellow flowers.
