= Esmé Frances Hennessy =

South African botanist and botanical artist (1933–2023)

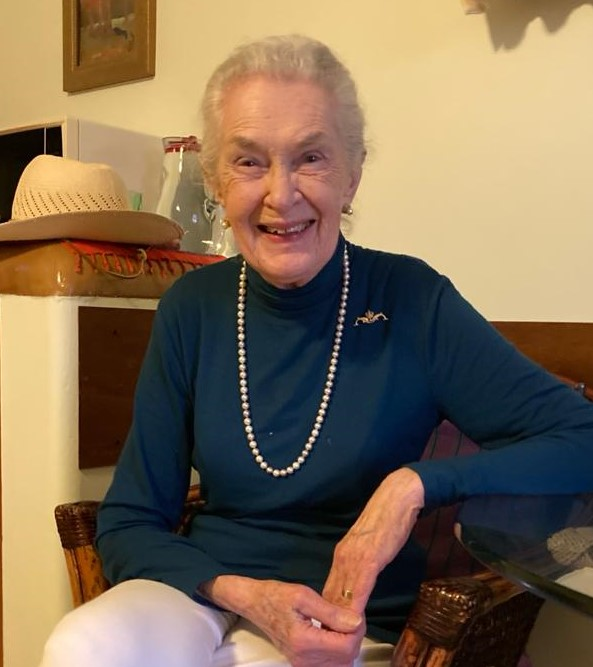

Esmé Frances Franklin Hennessy (30 August 1933 – 20 May 2023) was a South African botanist, botanical illustrator, and author. She specialised in taxonomic botany. She wrote and illustrated South African Erythrinas (1972), Orchids of Africa (1961) with Joyce Stewart, The Slipper Orchids (1989) with Tessa Hedge, and created many of the descriptions and plates in Flowering Plants of Africa as well as numerous private collections.

== Early life and education ==
Hennessy was born in the southern coastal village of Umzinto, on 30 August 1933, where her father was the district surgeon. She studied Botany and Zoology at the University of Natal, Pietermaritzburg, obtaining a PhD in Botany in 1983. In 1956, she married Royal Navy Commander Brian John Hennessy, and they had one son.

== Career ==
From 1958 to 1960, Hennessy was employed as a research assistant at the C.S.I.R. Amoebiasis Research Unit. In 1961 Hennessy was the first woman to be appointed as lecturer at University College, Durban. Between 1972 and 1993, she was a member of the science faculty at the University of Durban-Westville, first as senior lecturer and then as associate professor of Botany. >

In 1972, Hennessy published her first book South African Erythrinas, which she wrote and illustrated with 15 original colour plates. She illustrated and co-authored the books Orchids of Africa (1981) with Joyce Stewart and The Slipper Orchids (1989) with Tessa Hedge. Hennessy also created numerous illustrations and botanical descriptions for Flowering Plants of Africa and the American Orchid Society Bulletin. In 1991, Hennessy agreed to be the scientific editor of Elsa Pooley’s book A complete field guide to Trees of Natal, Zululand and Transkei.

She exhibited internationally and locally, including the Hunt Institute, Pittsburgh, in 1977, presenting an illustrated lecture on the flora of sub-tropical southern Africa. She exhibited also at the Royal Horticultural Society London (1989,1992), for which she was awarded two silver-gilt Grenfell Medals, and at the Smithsonian Institution in 2000.

Hennessy was involved in the American Orchid Society, Botanical Society of South Africa, Electron Microscopy Society of Southern Africa, Linnean Society of London (elected to Fellowship, 1985), Natal Orchid Society, Society of Botanical Artists, U.K. (founding member, 1988), South African Association of Botanists (founding member, 1968), South African Council of Natural Scientists (registered, 1983).

Hennessy retired from the Department of Botany, University of Durban-Westville in 1993, and accepted an honorary post as Associate Professor in the School of Botany and Zoology at the University of Natal, Pietermaritzburg, where she served until 2006.

In 2012, Hennessy illustrated the book Beautiful Corn: America’s Original Grain from Feed to Plate by Anthony Boutard, and in 2017, she contributed six original watercolor illustrations to the publication Baja Blooms: The Gardens of Los Colibris Casitas. She also identified many of the plants in the Los Colibris gardens, many of which were native to South Africa.

In 2020, the Botanical Society of South Africa awarded Dr. Hennessy the Cythna Letty Medal in honor of her body of published botanical illustrations, which have made a significant contribution to the promotion of South African plants.

== Personal life and death ==
In 2006, she emigrated to the United States, where she lived in Portland, Oregon.

Hennessy died on 20 May 2023, at the age of 89.

== Selected works (authored and illustrated) ==
- Clinical amoebiasis by Alexander Joseph Wilmot (1962)
- South African Erythrinas by Esmé Franklin Hennessy (1972)
- Orchids of Africa: a select review by Joyce Stewart (1981)
- The slipper orchids by Esmé Franklin Hennessy (1989)
- Of rushes, resources and riots by Esmé Franklin Hennessy (2000)
