= Susan Sex =

Irish botanical artist

- Born: 1947 (age 78–79); Dublin, Ireland
- Known for: Botanical artist

Susan Sex (born 1947) is an Irish botanical artist known for her paintings of orchids.

== Life ==
Susan Sex was born in Dublin in 1947. She is a self-taught artist who was interested in wild flowers. She has close ties with the National Botanic Gardens, Glasnevin, Dublin. She has painted a number of their tropical orchids.

She had a solo exhibition in the National Botanic Gardens which sold out in 1996. Sex has an interest in Irish orchids. She has won Gold Medals from the Royal Horticultural Society, London in 2000, 2001 and 2002 for her work on these and also the Jill Smythies Award from the Linnean Society of London in 2010. She has also published a book with Brendan Sayer on Wild Irish Orchids. Sex also designed the postage stamp collection of the Wild Flowers Of Ireland and four native trees for the Flora and Fauna series in 2006 for An Post.
