= Cedric Carr =

New Zealand botanist

Cedric Errol Carr
- Born: 16 November 1892; Napier, New Zealand
- Died: 3 June 1936 (aged 43); Port Moresby, New Guinea
- Scientific career
- Fields: Botany
- Author abbrev. (botany): Carr

Cedric Errol Carr (16 November 1892 – 3 June 1936) was a New Zealand botanist, specialising in orchids. At the age of seven he went to England with his family but from January 1913 until 1931, apart from military service from 1916 to 1918, he worked on rubber plantations in Malaya.

From boyhood, Carr had been interested in orchids and from 1928 to 1932, he accompanied Richard Holttum, sometimes also Edred Corner on collecting expeditions to Mount Tahan, Berastagi, Lake Toba and other areas of Sumatra and spent several months on Mount Kinabalu.

In 1933 and 1934 he worked at the Kew Herbarium before travelling to New Guinea and spending several years collecting around Port Moresby, including the Kairuku-Hiri District. He collected in the New Guinea Highlands including in the Owen Stanley Range at altitudes up to 10,000 ft (3,000 m).

In 1936 he died of blackwater fever in Port Moresby. Following his death, more than 4,000 of his orchid collections and detailed descriptions of the specimens were given to the Singapore Herbarium.

The palm, Hydriastele carrii Burret (now known as Hydriastele wendlandiana (F.Muell.) H.Wendl. & Drude), and the mistletoe genus, Cecarria Barlow, are named after him.

== Publications ==
(list incomplete)

- Carr, C. E. (1928). Orchid pollination notes. Journal of the Malayan Branch of the Royal Asiatic Society, 6(1 (102), 49–73. JSTOR
- Carr, C. E. (1933). Some Malayan Orchids IV. Journal of the Malayan Branch of the Royal Asiatic Society, 11(1 (116), 66-iv. JSTOR
- Carr, C. E. (1934). Coelogyne zurowetzii. Orchid Rev, 42, 44.
- Holttum, R. E., & Carr, C. E. (1932). Notes on hybridisation of orchids. Malayan Orchid Rev, 1, 13–17.
- Carr, C. E. (1934). On a collection of orchids from the Solomon Islands. Bulletin of Miscellaneous Information (Royal Botanic Gardens, Kew), 375–383. JSTOR
