= Jenny Brasier =

British botanical artist (1936–2020)

- Born: 9 August 1936 (age 89); Alvechurch, Birmingham, England
- Died: 28 December 2020 (aged 84); East Sussex, England
- Occupation: botanical artist

Jenny Brasier (1936–2020) was a botanical artist and book illustrator.

Brasier was born on 9 August 1936 in Alvechurch near Birmingham, UK.

She painted in watercolour and was known for painting on vellum. She did not receive any formal training. She was a neighbour of the art teacher and author Wilfrid Blunt who encouraged her painting.

During her lifetime she exhibited in the UK and internationally, including at the Smithsonian Museum and the Hunt Institute for Botanical Documentation at Carnegie Mellon University in the USA. She also illustrated some books. Some of her paintings were included in The Art of Botanical Illustration, the first survey published of European botanical artists. Her paintings are included in UK national collections including the Natural History Museum, Victoria and Albert Museum, Royal Horticultural Society and Kew Gardens.

== Awards ==
She was awarded Gold Medals in 1982, 1988, 1989, 1994, and 2000 by the Royal Horticultural Society. In 2002 she was given the Jill Smythies Award by the Linnean Society for accurate published botanical illustrations.
