= Mycotroph =

Plant that obtains its nutrient supply through symbiotic association with fungi

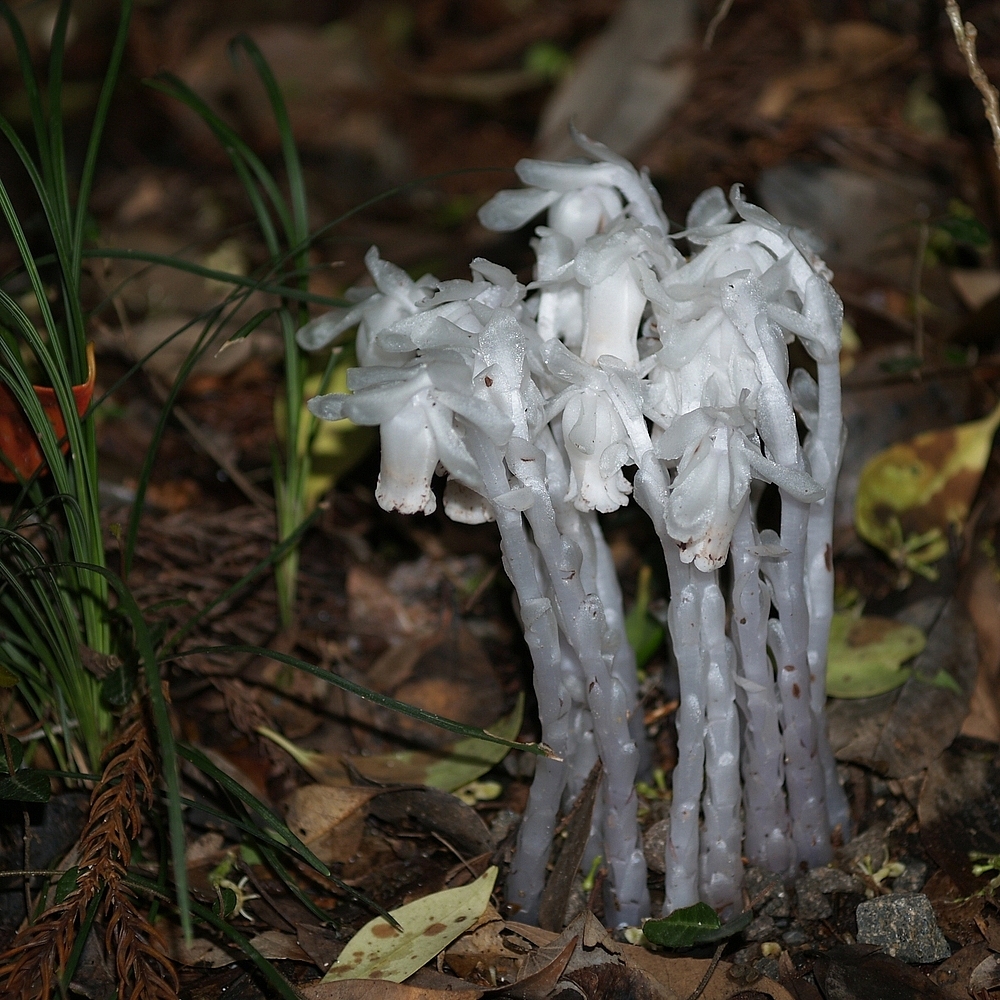
Monotropastrum humile A kind of myco-heterotroph

A mycotroph is a plant that gets all or part of its carbon, water, or nutrient supply through symbiotic association with fungi. A holomycotroph gets all its nutrition solely from a mycorrhizal symbiosis. The term can refer to plants that engage in either of two distinct symbioses with fungi:

- Many mycotrophs have a mutualistic association with fungi in any of several forms of mycorrhiza. The majority of plant species are mycotrophic in this sense. Examples include Burmanniaceae.
- Some mycotrophs are parasitic upon fungi in an association known as myco-heterotrophy.
