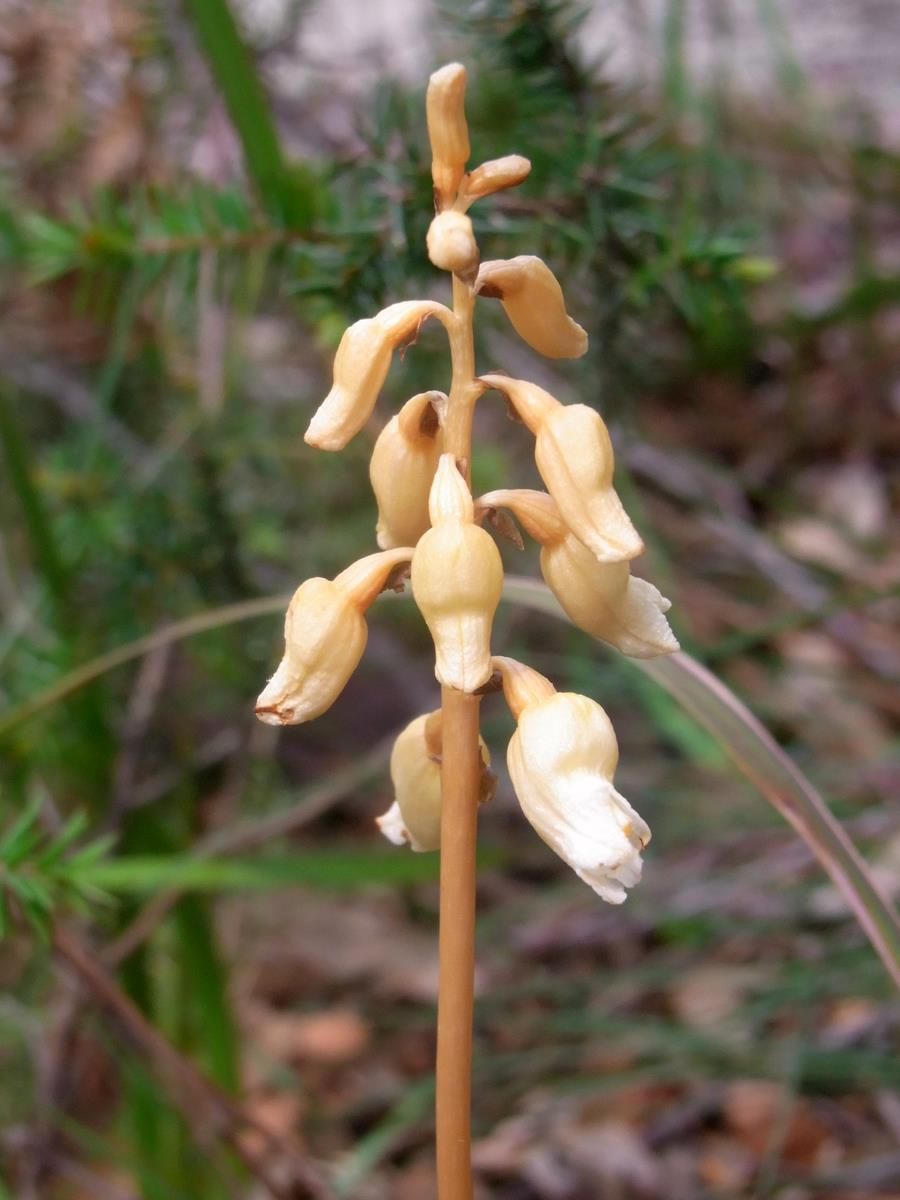
- Gastrodia sesamoides

Scientific classification
- Kingdom: Plantae
- Clade: Tracheophytes
- Clade: Angiosperms
- Clade: Monocots
- Order: Asparagales
- Family: Orchidaceae
- Subfamily: Epidendroideae
- Tribe: Gastrodieae; Lindl., (1826) Orchid. Select., 7, 11 (1826)

Genera
- See text

= Gastrodieae =

Tribe of orchids

Gastrodieae is an orchid tribe in the subfamily Epidendroideae.

== Genera ==
Genera included in Chase et al.'s 2015 classification of orchids:

- Auxopus
- Didymoplexiella
- Didymoplexis
- Gastrodia
- Uleiorchis

Didymoplexiopsis may also belong in the tribe, but is not mentioned by Chase et al.

== See also ==
- Taxonomy of the Orchidaceae
