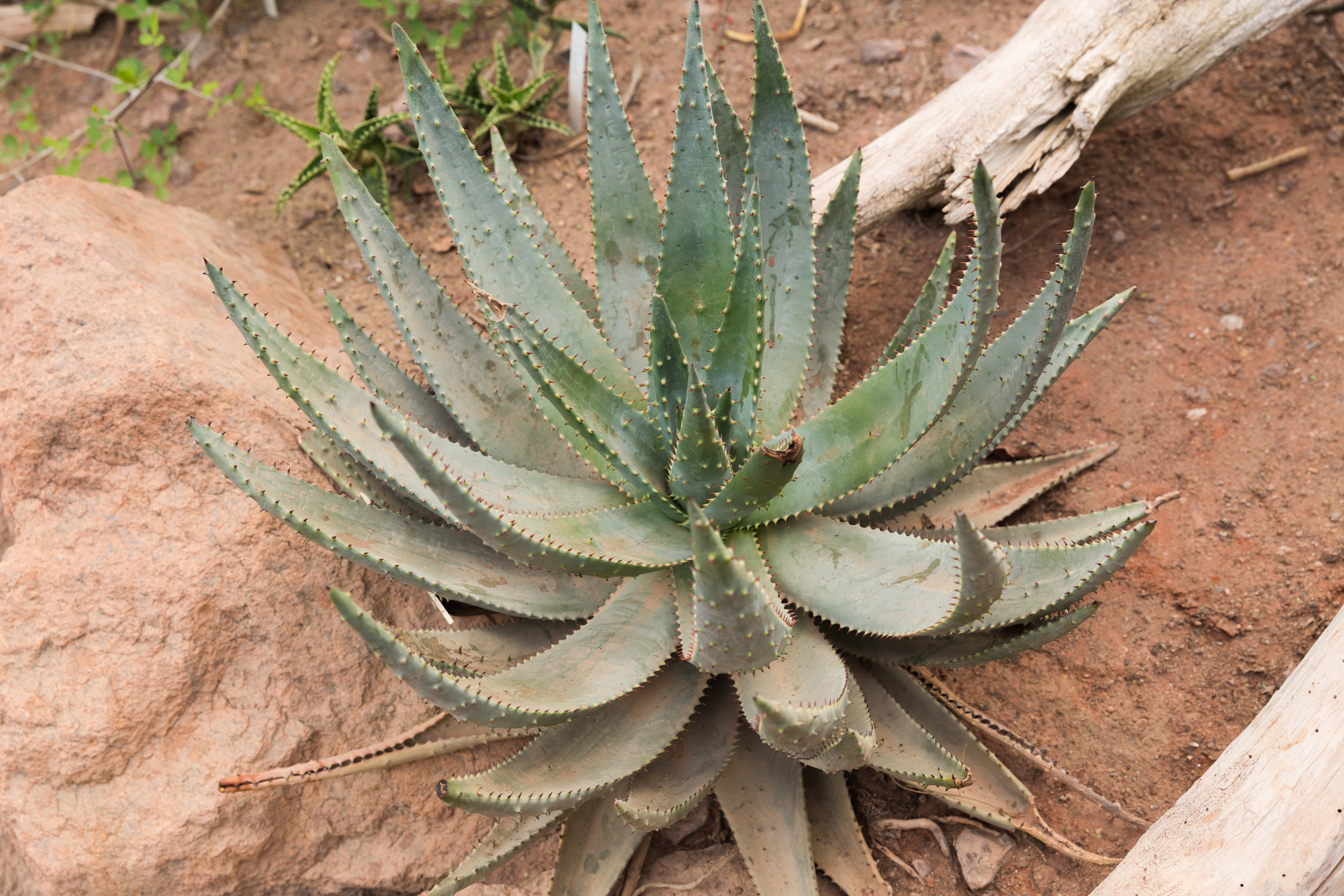

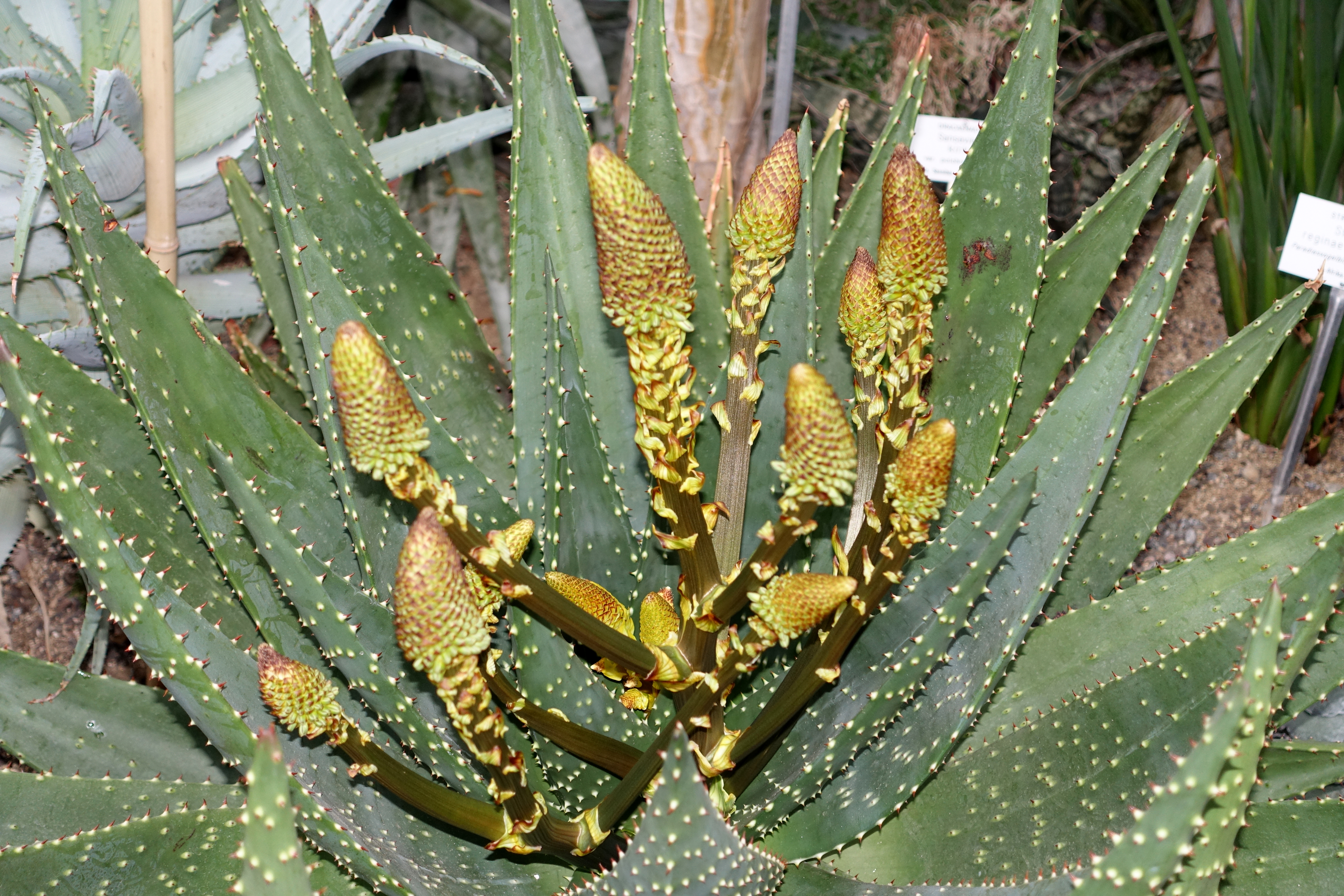

Conservation status
- CITES Appendix II (CITES)

Scientific classification
- Kingdom: Plantae
- Clade: Tracheophytes
- Clade: Angiosperms
- Clade: Monocots
- Order: Asparagales
- Family: Asphodelaceae
- Subfamily: Asphodeloideae
- Genus: Aloe
- Species: A. aculeata

Binomial name
- Aloe aculeata Pole-Evans

= Aloe aculeata =

Species of succulent

Aloe aculeata (common names include ngopanie, sekope, red hot poker aloe) is an Aloe species that is native to the Limpopo valley and Mpumalanga in South Africa along with southern and central Zimbabwe and Mozambique. It grows on rocky outcrops in grassland and dry bushveld. Aculeata ("prickly") refers to the spines on the leaf's surface and the teeth on its margins.

The plant's leaves reach 30 to 60 cm (12 to 24 in) tall. Flowers are reddish orange to yellow when in bud, opening to orange to yellow, and 23 to 40 mm (0.91 to 1.57 in) long.

Aloe aculeata was depicted on the reverse of the South African 10 cent coin from 1965-1989. The plant can also be viewed in the Gibraltar Botanic Gardens.
