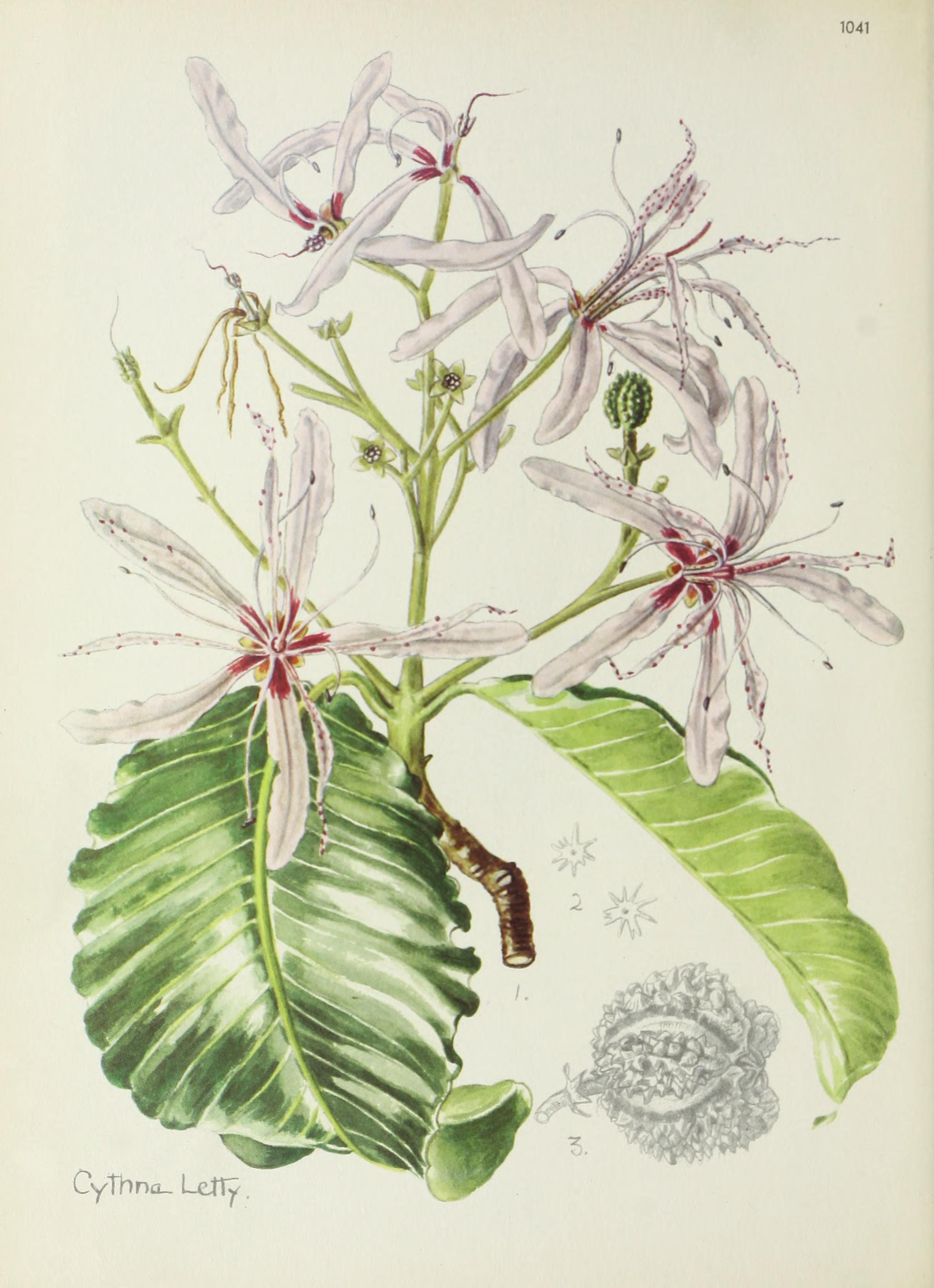
- C. capense illustrated by Cythna Letty

Scientific classification
- Kingdom: Plantae
- Clade: Tracheophytes
- Clade: Angiosperms
- Clade: Eudicots
- Clade: Rosids
- Order: Sapindales
- Family: Rutaceae
- Subfamily: Zanthoxyloideae
- Genus: Calodendrum; Thunb.

Species
- Calodendrum capense Thunb.; Calodendrum eickii Engl.

= Calodendrum =

Genus of flowering plants

Calodendrum is a genus of medium-sized evergreen trees comprising two species from Africa. Calodendrum capense, the Cape chestnut, is a well known tree that is widely cultivated, while Calodendrum eickii is a rare forest tree from Tanzania. The botanical name comes from Greek, kalos means beautiful and dendrum means tree. Both species are harvested for their timber in Africa.
