= Drimia namibensis =

Conservation status
- Least Concern (IUCN 3.1)

Scientific classification
- Kingdom: Plantae
- Clade: Tracheophytes
- Clade: Angiosperms
- Clade: Monocots
- Order: Asparagales
- Family: Asparagaceae
- Subfamily: Scilloideae
- Genus: Drimia
- Species: D. namibensis

Binomial name
- Drimia namibensis (Oberm.) J.C.Manning & Goldblatt

Synonyms
- Rhadamanthopsis namibensis (Oberm.) Mart.-Azorín, M.B.Crespo & M.Á.Alonso; Rhadamanthus namibensis Oberm.

Species of flowering plant

Drimia namibensis (syn. Rhadamanthus namibensis) is a species of plant that is endemic to Namibia. Its natural habitat is cold desert.

The species was first described as Rhadamanthus namibensis by Anna Amelia Obermeyer in 1980. The name was invalid and was validated in 2014. In 2018 John Charles Manning and Peter Goldblatt placed the species in genus Drimia as D. namibensis.
