= Trachyandra peculiaris =

Conservation status
- Vulnerable (IUCN 3.1)

Scientific classification
- Kingdom: Plantae
- Clade: Tracheophytes
- Clade: Angiosperms
- Clade: Monocots
- Order: Asparagales
- Family: Asphodelaceae
- Subfamily: Asphodeloideae
- Genus: Trachyandra
- Species: T. peculiaris

Binomial name
- Trachyandra peculiaris (Dinter) Oberm.

Synonyms
- Anthericum peculiare Dinter

Species of flowering plant

Trachyandra peculiaris is a species of plant which is endemic to Namibia. It is threatened by habitat loss.
