= Lansdell =

Lansdell is a surname. Notable people with the surname include:

- Elissa Lansdell, Canadian television personality
- Grenny Lansdell (1918–1984), American football halfback
- Henry Lansdell (1841–1919), British Anglican priest
- Kathleen Annie Lansdell (1888–1967), South African painter and illustrator
