= Flowering Plants of Africa =

South African illustrated botanical magazine series published since 1920

Cover of a March 1959 issue

Kniphofia porphyrantha Cythna Letty (1959)

Flowering Plants of Africa is a series of illustrated botanical magazines akin to Curtis's Botanical Magazine, initiated as Flowering Plants of South Africa by I. B. Pole-Evans in 1920. It is now published by the South African National Biodiversity Institute in Pretoria. The magazine depicts and describes flowering plants from Africa and its neighbouring islands. The issues are printed in soft cover measuring 250 x 190 mm.

The first volumes were printed in England by L. Reeve & Co. These first illustrations were done in black and white by lithography, zinc plates later replacing the stone. A copy of the original water colour guided teams of hand-colour artists who applied paint where needed. Hand-colouring was a family craft carried on from generation to generation. Single colour printing was occasionally done to help speed the process, especially when skilled hand-colour artists were in short supply, as happened in World War II.

Notable botanists who contributed to this journal include Anna Amelia Obermeyer and Josef Bogner.

Notable botanical artists who have contributed to its pages include Kathleen Annie Lansdell, Gillian Condy, Fay Anderson, Auriol Batten, Rosemary Holcroft, Betty Connell, Cythna Letty (who was responsible for over 700 plates), Barbara Pike and Ellaphie Ward-Hilhorst.

The series was edited by I. B. Pole-Evans (1921–1939), Edwin Percy Phillips (1940–1944), Robert Allen Dyer (1945–1964) and L. E. W. Codd.
