= Mary Elizabeth Connell =

English-born South African botanical illustrator

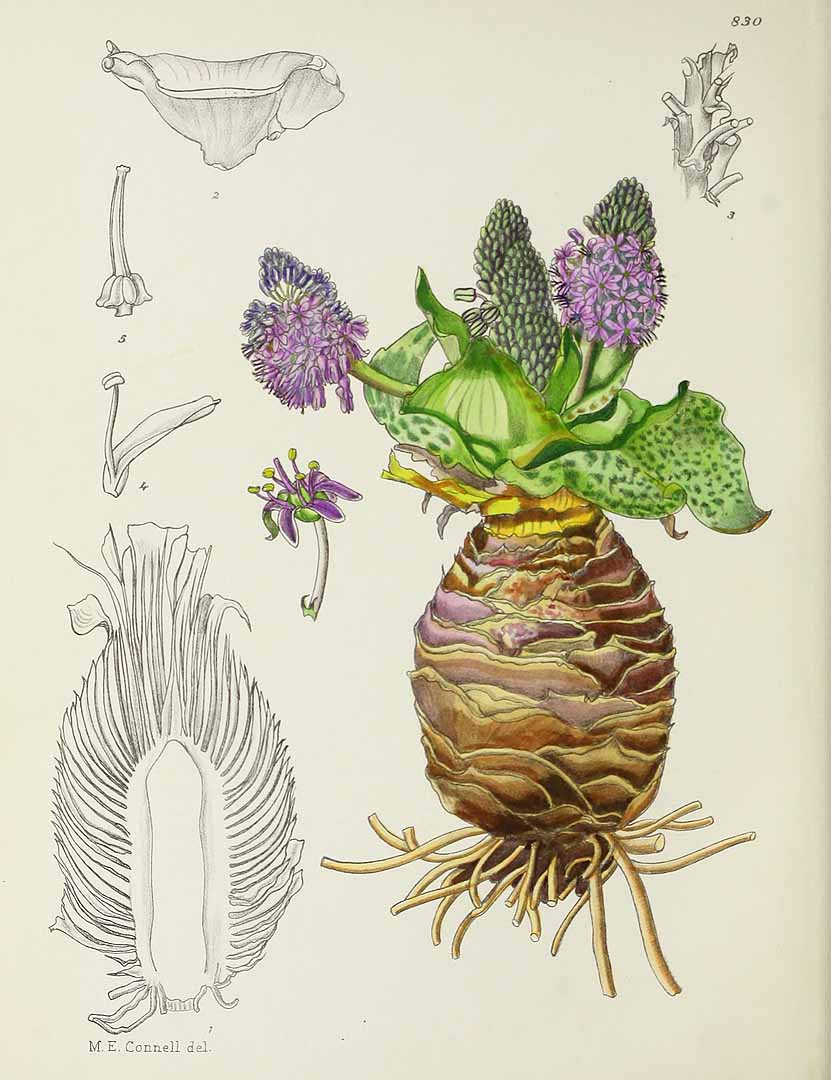
Ledebouria ovatifolia

Mary Elizabeth Connell (26 March 1917, York - July 1997) was an English-born South African botanical illustrator.

Even at an early age Connell showed exceptional artistic talent and her first schooling was at the York College for Girls (closed down in 1997). She submitted her work to the Royal College of Art for their Masters examinations and was awarded honours in 1932 for Drawing from Nature Forms and 1933 for Pictorial Representation.

In 1933 her family moved to South Africa. She completed her schooling at Barnato Park High School in Berea, and enrolled at the Johannesburg School of Art. However, in 1936 a botanical artist post at the National Herbarium in Pretoria became available and her appointment was approved.

Her first project was to produce large plates illustrating poisonous and noxious plants for publication in the periodical 'Farming in South Africa', and later published as Henderson and Anderson's 'Common Weeds in South Africa' (Botanical Survey Memoir No. 37 of 1966). She was taken under the wing of Cythna Letty, grand dame of South African botanical artists, and began to produce plates for the botanical journal 'Flowering Plants of Africa'. In all, she created 121 plates for that work.

In addition she contributed artwork for White, Dyer & Sloane's 'The Succulent Euphorbieae' (1941), Meredith's 'The Grasses and Pastures of South Africa' (1955) and 'Flora of Southern Africa'. After producing and raising a family she returned to the National Herbarium between 1958 and 1960, and created 83 of the line drawings of weeds for 'Common Weeds in South Africa' (1966), a new version of Phillips’ 'Weeds of South Africa' (1939), a publication to which she had also contributed.

== Personal life ==
She married Niko Stutterheim (1915–2005), a chemical engineer and company director, son of Nicolaas Anton Stutterheim and Elizabeth Catherina van Nouhuijs, in February 1942.

Their children were Jan Anton, Catherine Mary, Konrad, Adrian Henk, and Philip Oswald.
