= Calodendrum eickii =

Conservation status
- Critically Endangered (IUCN 2.3)

Scientific classification
- Kingdom: Plantae
- Clade: Tracheophytes
- Clade: Angiosperms
- Clade: Eudicots
- Clade: Rosids
- Order: Sapindales
- Family: Rutaceae
- Genus: Calodendrum
- Species: C. eickii

Binomial name
- Calodendrum eickii Engl., 1903 , as Calodendron eckii

Species of tree

Calodendrum eickii is a rare forest tree from Tanzania which is closely related to the widely cultivated Calodendrum capense, or Cape chestnut.

The tree is endemic to montane Juniperus forest in the West Usambara Mountains where it is under threat from expansion of commercial pine plantations and agricultural development.
