= Pegler =

Pegler is an English surname. Notable people with the surname include:

- Alan Pegler (1920–2012), British railway preservationist
- Alice Pegler (1861–1929), South African teacher and botanical collector
- David Pegler (born 1938), British mycologist
- Don Pegler, Australian politician
- Luke Pegler (born 1981), Australian actor
- Sid Pegler (1888–1972), South African cricketer
- Westbrook Pegler (1894–1969), American journalist and writer

== See also ==
- Pegler Yorkshire, a British manufacturer of valves and other engineering products
- Hetty Pegler's Tump, a Neolithic burial mound in Gloucestershire, England
