= Trachyandra erythrorrhiza =

Conservation status
- Vulnerable (IUCN 3.1)

Scientific classification
- Kingdom: Plantae
- Clade: Tracheophytes
- Clade: Angiosperms
- Clade: Monocots
- Order: Asparagales
- Family: Asphodelaceae
- Subfamily: Asphodeloideae
- Genus: Trachyandra
- Species: T. erythrorrhiza

Binomial name
- Trachyandra erythrorrhiza (P.Conrath) Oberm.

Species of flowering plant

Trachyandra erythrorrhiza is a species of plant which is endemic to the province of Gauteng in South Africa. Its natural habitat is intermittent freshwater marshes. It is threatened by habitat loss.
