= Aloe lettyae =

Conservation status
- CITES Appendix II (CITES)

Scientific classification
- Kingdom: Plantae
- Clade: Tracheophytes
- Clade: Angiosperms
- Clade: Monocots
- Order: Asparagales
- Family: Asphodelaceae
- Subfamily: Asphodeloideae
- Genus: Aloe
- Species: A. lettyae

Binomial name
- Aloe lettyae Reynolds

Species of Aloe

Aloe lettyae is a species of aloe endemic to the Woodbush Granite Grassland in the Haenertsburg Nature Reserve in the Limpopo Province, South Africa. It is endangered species, prone to fires and introduction of foreign species for economical reasons. They have become a face for this highly threatened area lacking in proper research for various ecological reasons.

Aloe lettyae was named in honor of Cythna Letty, a famous South African botanical artist, in 1937.

== Description ==
Aloe lettyae is a spotted aloe. During its flowering time, in summer and fall, the flowers differ drastically from the appearance of the mature plant. The flowers have vibrant orange, bulbous bases and have flared tips at the petals that are greenish in color. Once bloomed, the leaves are blue green in color and are spotted with beige colored marking all over the surface of the leaves. Along the sides of the leaves, one can find "teeth" or sharp spikes. The plant reaches a height of about 1 foot and a width of 2-3 feet

Flowers are bright red-orange. They are long and tubular, which fits the beak of the Amethyst sunbird. This species will flower in the summer, when the populations of insects are relatively higher. Individuals of this species who bloom in the winter are reproductively less successful than their counterparts who bloom in the summer. For honeybees who pollinate this species, they will dive into the tube to reach the pollen, making their actions less effective than the work of the Amethyst sunbird. While their tube shape makes it harder for pollinators to reach the pollen, it does deter insects who eat the nectar of the flower, which can be a competitive advantage.

Aloe lettyae produce a fruit that is green, and rather small, but is subject to a considerable amount of herbivory, both from birds and insects. The main herbivores of the fruit are various fly and wasp species in the grassland. In a study by Kremer-Köhne et al., 2020, 90% of fruits that were collected by the researchers had flies and/or wasps remaining on them.

== Distribution and habitat ==
The species naturally occurs in Limpopo Province in South Africa between Haenertsburg and Tzaneen and is restricted to this small area which has relatively high rainfall and granitic soils that are sandy and drains very fast. Aloe lettyae is an endemic to endangered Woodbush Granite Grassland in Limpopo Province and occupies 123 km^{2} of land out of 17.5ha habitat. Aloe lettyae were severely vegetation fragmented that clustered on south western of Wood Bush Granite Grassland less than 40km apart, varying from 10 to 6547 plants and approximately 10,800 individuals. Fragments of Woodbush Granite Grassland were found to comprise 77-89% of adult Aloe Lettyae and 3-14% of the juveniles.

The species is a succulent plant that grows in full sun in well-drained soil. It is a cold-tolerant hardy plant that can survive as low as 25°F which is about 4°C, and it flowers before freezing.

== Ecology ==
Aloe lettyae thrives with dense vegetation and surrounding tall grasses. Some of the most common plants surrounding Aloe lettyae in their native habitat include Cymbopogon nardus (a grass species) and Helichrysum platypterum (a forb species). With the biodiversity and populations of plant species decreasing in the grassland where they are found, Aloe lettyae becomes even more at risk for endangerment.

The species attracts pollinators and herbivores alike. Research from Kohne et al. in 2020 showed that the Amethyst sunbird (Chalcomitra amethystina) is the main pollinator of this species, with honeybees (Apis) acting as a co-pollinator. There are other animals that reduce the fitness of this aloe species, such as the chrysomelid beetle (Chrysomelidae), who have been recorded to eat the fruit and inflorescences. Lagriini sp. beetles and Apenthecia cf. crassiseta reduce the fitness of Aloe lettyae by feeding on their seeds, therefore reducing the success of their dispersal.

=== Conservation status ===
According to the South African National Biodiversity Institute, Aloe lettyae is classified as endangered. There are many reasons for this, which include new, foreign tree species being cultivated in and dominating the area for decorative wood harvesting. Also, due to changes in climate, wildfires have been more prominent and more common, which has resulted in an increase to more fire-resistant shrubs and bushes, and a subsequent decrease in Aloe lettyae populations in the area.

Aloe lettyae is present in 19 populations in Limpopo. 13 of which are classified as critically endangered ecosystems. A large majority of Aloe lettyae fruit are predated upon by both invertebrate and vertebrate fauna. Holes on the leaf are assumed to be from predation, though no organism has been documented as feeding on Lettyae leaves. The remaining 5 populations are found in unnatural habitats. 27 percent of Aloe lettyae's ecosystem remains, out of the roughly 340 km^{2} of habitat. Due to invasive species, transformations via farmland or livestock zoning, or general human activity such as littering and manmade fires

Aloe lettyae has been found to not be at risk to some common diseases. For example, aloe species are often susceptible to "aloe cancer" which is caused by mites, but was found to not be a common occurrence in Aloe lettaye. White scale insects, a parasite also common in aloe plants, are not found in high abundance on the species either.
