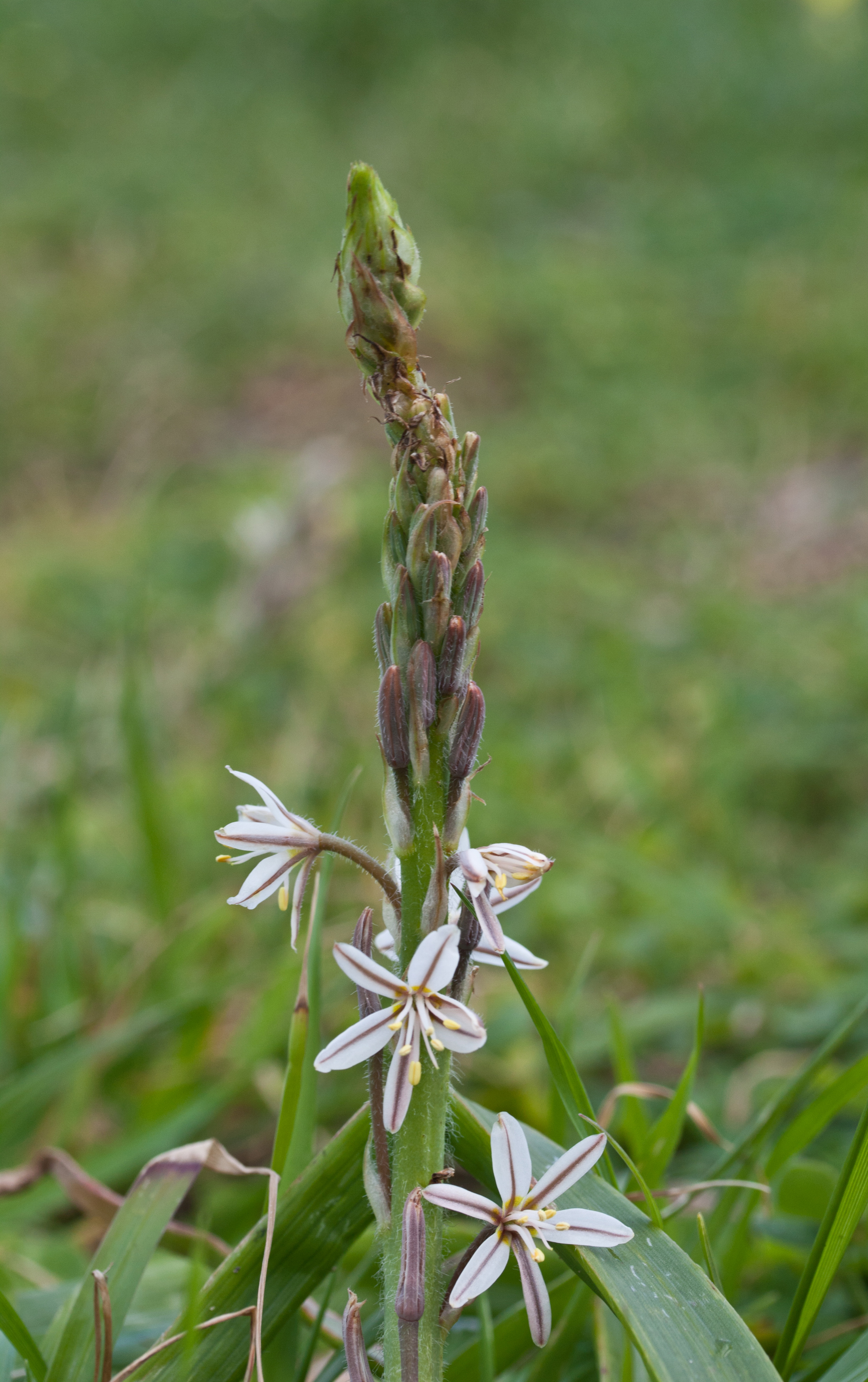
- Trachyandra ciliata

Scientific classification
- Kingdom: Plantae
- Clade: Embryophytes
- Clade: Tracheophytes
- Clade: Angiosperms
- Clade: Monocots
- Order: Asparagales
- Family: Asphodelaceae
- Subfamily: Asphodeloideae
- Genus: Trachyandra; Kunth

Synonyms
- Lepicaulon Raf.; Licinia Raf.; Trachinema Raf.; Dilanthes Salisb.; Liriothamnus Schltr.

= Trachyandra =

Genus of flowering plants

Trachyandra is a genus of plant in the family Asphodelaceae, subfamily Asphodeloideae, first described as a genus in 1843. It is native to eastern and southern Africa, as well as to Yemen and Madagascar. Many of the species are endemic to South Africa.

Species

1. Trachyandra acocksii Oberm. – Cape Province in South Africa
2. Trachyandra adamsonii (Compton) Oberm. – Cape Province, Namibia
3. Trachyandra affinis Kunth – Cape Province, KwaZulu-Natal
4. Trachyandra arenicola J.C.Manning & Goldblatt – Cape Province
5. Trachyandra aridimontana J.C.Manning – Cape Province
6. Trachyandra arvensis (Schinz) Oberm. – Angola, Zambia, Zimbabwe, Botswana, Namibia
7. Trachyandra asperata Kunth – South Africa, Lesotho, Eswatini
8. Trachyandra brachypoda (Baker) Oberm. – Cape Province
9. Trachyandra bulbinifolia (Dinter) Oberm. – Cape Province, Namibia
10. Trachyandra burkei (Baker) Oberm. – Botswana, Limpopo, Free State, Cape Province
11. Trachyandra capillata (Poelln.) Oberm. – KwaZulu-Natal
12. Trachyandra chlamydophylla (Baker) Oberm. – Cape Province
13. Trachyandra ciliata (L.f.) Kunth – Cape Province, Namibia
14. Trachyandra dissecta Oberm. – Cape Province
15. Trachyandra divaricata (Jacq.) Kunth – Cape Province; naturalized in Australia
16. Trachyandra ensifolia (Sölch) Roessler – Namibia
17. Trachyandra erythrorrhiza (Conrath) Oberm. – Gauteng
18. Trachyandra esterhuysenae Oberm. – Cape Province
19. Trachyandra falcata (L.f.) Kunth – Cape Province, Namibia
20. Trachyandra filiformis (Aiton) Oberm. – Cape Province
21. Trachyandra flexifolia (L.f.) Kunth – Cape Province
22. Trachyandra gerrardii (Baker) Oberm. – Eswatini, South Africa
23. Trachyandra giffenii (F.M.Leight.) Oberm. – Cape Province
24. Trachyandra glandulosa (Dinter) Oberm. – Namibia
25. Trachyandra gracilenta Oberm. – Cape Province
26. Trachyandra hantamensis Boatwr. & J.C.Manning – Cape Province
27. Trachyandra hirsuta (Thunb.) Kunth – Cape Province
28. Trachyandra hirsutiflora (Adamson) Oberm. – Cape Province
29. Trachyandra hispida (L.) Kunth – Cape Province
30. Trachyandra involucrata (Baker) Oberm. – Cape Province
31. Trachyandra jacquiniana (Schult. & Schult.f.) Oberm. – Cape Province
32. Trachyandra kamiesbergensis Boatwr. & J.C.Manning – Cape Province
33. Trachyandra karrooica Oberm. – Cape Province, Namibia
34. Trachyandra lanata (Dinter) Oberm. – Namibia
35. Trachyandra laxa (N.E.Br.) Oberm. – South Africa, Namibia, Botswana
36. Trachyandra malosana (Baker) Oberm. – Malawi to Zimbabwe
37. Trachyandra mandrarensis (H.Perrier) Marais & Reilly – Madagascar
38. Trachyandra margaretae Oberm. – Mpumalanga, KwaZulu-Natal
39. Trachyandra montana J.C.Manning & Goldblatt – Cape Province
40. Trachyandra muricata (L.f.) Kunth – Cape Province, Namibia
41. Trachyandra oligotricha (Baker) Oberm. – Cape Province
42. Trachyandra paniculata Oberm. – Cape Province
43. Trachyandra patens Oberm. – Cape Province
44. Trachyandra peculiaris (Dinter) Oberm. – Namibia
45. Trachyandra prolifera P.L.Perry – Cape Province
46. Trachyandra pyrenicarpa (Welw. ex Baker) Oberm. Huíla Province in Angola
47. Trachyandra revoluta (L.) Kunth – Cape Province, Namibia
48. Trachyandra sabulosa (Adamson) Oberm. – Cape Province
49. Trachyandra saltii (Baker) Oberm. – eastern + southern Africa from Ethiopia to Cape Province; Yemen
50. Trachyandra sanguinorhiza Boatwr. & J.C.Manning – Cape Province
51. Trachyandra scabra (L.f.) Kunth – Cape Province
52. Trachyandra smalliana Hilliard & B.L.Burtt – Cape Province, KwaZulu-Natal
53. Trachyandra tabularis (Baker) Oberm. – Cape Province
54. Trachyandra thyrsoidea (Baker) Oberm. – Cape Province
55. Trachyandra tortilis (Baker) Oberm. – Cape Province
56. Trachyandra triquetra Thulin – Somalia
57. Trachyandra zebrina (Schltr. ex Poelln.) Oberm. – Cape Province
