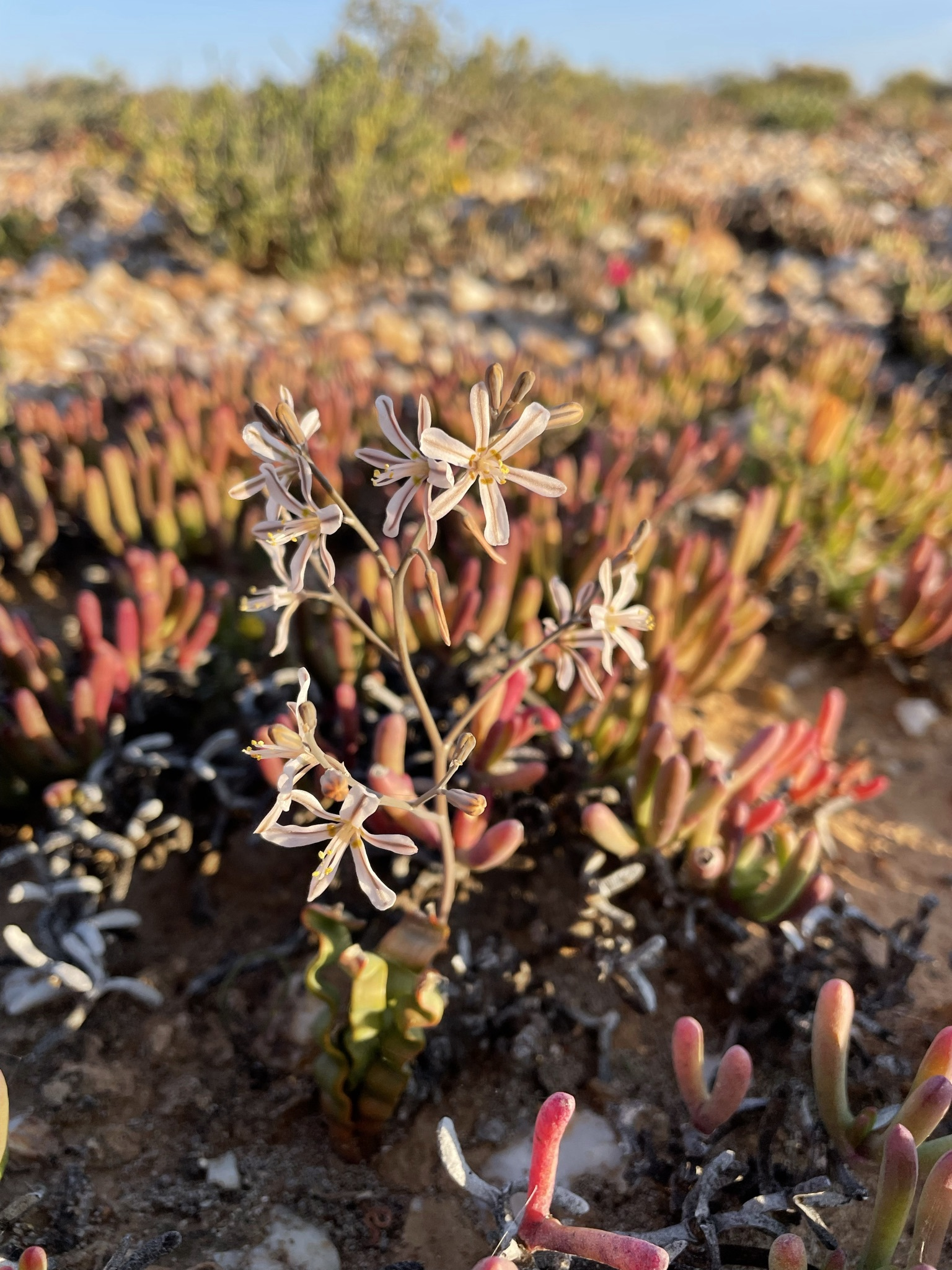

Conservation status
- Least Concern (SANBI Red List)

Scientific classification
- Kingdom: Plantae
- Clade: Embryophytes
- Clade: Tracheophytes
- Clade: Angiosperms
- Clade: Monocots
- Order: Asparagales
- Family: Asphodelaceae
- Subfamily: Asphodeloideae
- Genus: Trachyandra
- Species: T. tortilis

Binomial name
- Trachyandra tortilis (Baker) Oberm.

Synonyms
- Anthericum oocarpum Schltr. ex Poelln.; Anthericum salteri F.M.Leight.; Anthericum tortile Baker

= Trachyandra tortilis =

Species of plant endemic to South Africa

Trachyandra tortilis is a species of succulent in the genus Trachyandra. It is endemic to the Cape Provinces of South Africa.

== Distribution ==
Trachyandra tortilis is found in the Richtersveld and Namaqualand, southwards to Vredendal, Hopefield and Saron.

== Conservation status ==
Trachyandra tortilis is classified as Least Concern as it is widespread and not threatened.
