= Cythna Letty =

South African botanical artist (1895–1985)

- Born: 1 January 1895; Standerton, South Africa
- Died: 3 May 1985 (aged 90); Pretoria, South Africa
- Occupation: Botanical artist
- Notable work: Four publications
- Parents: Walter Edward Letty (father); Josina Christina Lindenberg (mother)
- Awards: Silver Medal

Cythna Letty

Cythna Lindenberg Letty (1 January 1895, in Standerton – 3 May 1985, in Pretoria), was a South African botanical artist and is regarded as a doyenne of South African botanical art by virtue of the quality and quantity of her meticulously executed paintings and pencil sketches, produced over a period of 40 years with the National Herbarium in Pretoria.

Cythna Letty is best remembered for her book Wild Flowers of the Transvaal, which was published in 1962. When decimal currency was introduced in South Africa, she was asked to design the floral motifs for the 10, 20 and 50 cent coins. Besides painting, she was an accomplished poet and published Children of the Hours when she was in her eighties.

Cythna was the eldest child of her mother, Josina Christina Lindenberg's second marriage, and was named after the heroine in Percy Shelley's poem "The Revolt of Islam". The Lettys had five children, and for many years the six children from Josina's first marriage were part of an extended, disciplined family. They were taught to play a number of musical instruments.

Cythna's father, Walter Edward Letty, had many career changes, and the family was often uprooted. As a result, Cythna attended a total of 13 schools, ending at the Pretoria Girls' High School. With the outbreak of World War I, Walter enlisted and served in France and remained there after peace was declared. Josina supported the family by illustrating genealogical charts. Her artistic skills were passed on to a number of her children, but only Cythna had a passion for botanical subjects.

Cythna's main occupations until 1924 were teaching and nursing. For two years she worked as an artist at the Veterinary Division at Onderstepoort near Pretoria, illustrating diseased and cancerous organs, after which she transferred to the Division of Plant Industry under Dr I.B. Pole-Evans. It was here that she started on 730 contributions to Flowering Plants of Africa, an example of which is Anemone fanninii Harv. ex Mast.

She resigned in 1938 to marry Oscar William Alric Forssman. After producing a son, she rejoined the Division of Botany in 1945 and stayed until 1966. She was awarded a silver medal by the Royal Horticultural Society for her exhibition of flower paintings in 1970.

Her interest in Zantedeschia led her to a study of the genus, and her revision appeared in Bothalia 11: 5-26 (1973). She illustrated numerous books on botany, such as the Botanical Survey Memoir Trees and Shrubs in the Kruger National Park (1951) by L. E. W. Codd, who was at that time director of the Botanical Research Institute. Others were The Stapelieae (1937) by White & Sloane and Grasses and Pastures of South Africa (1955) by Lucy K.A. Chippindall. In 1973 she received an honorary LL.D. from the University of Witwatersrand.

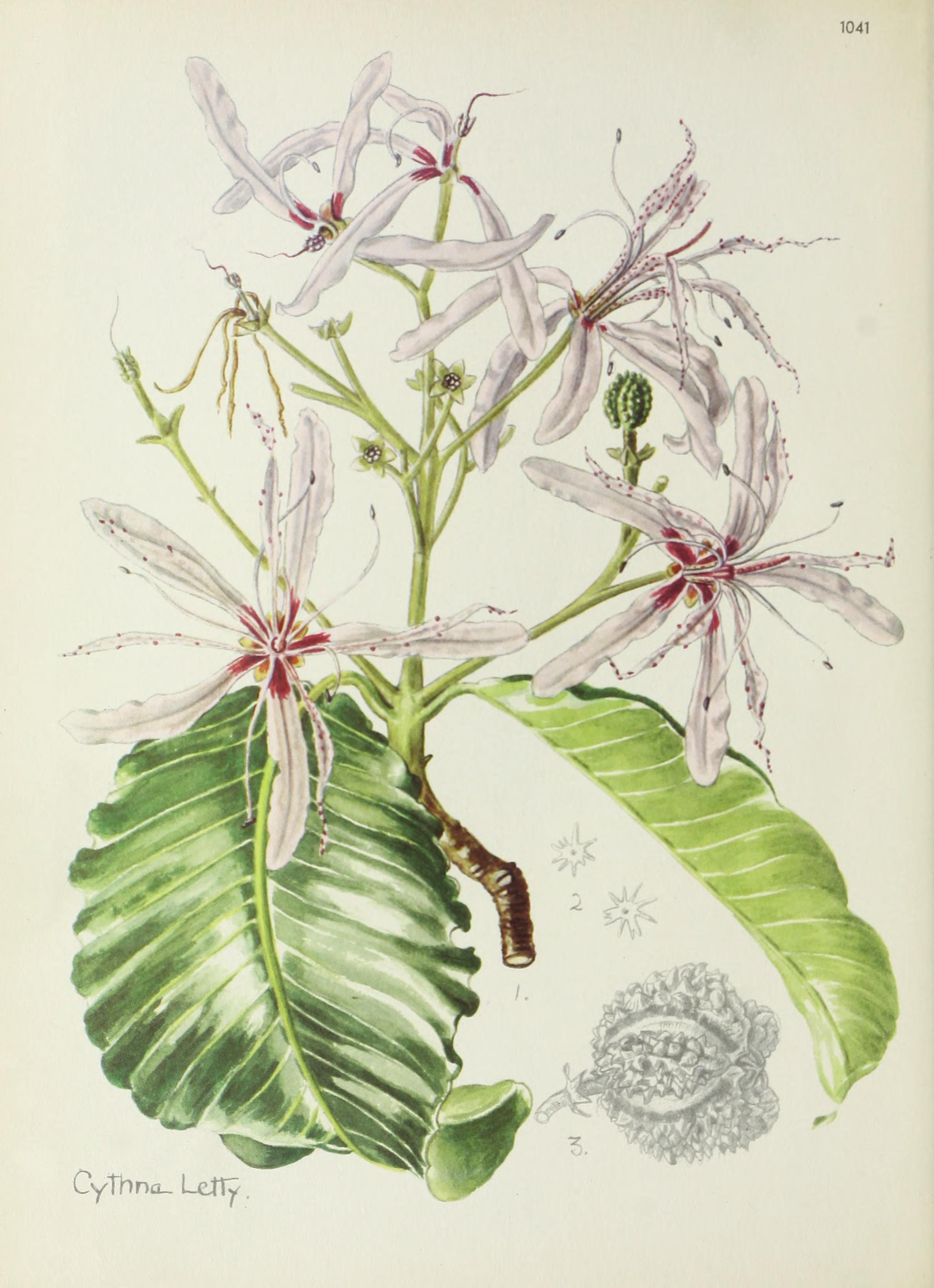
Calodendrum capense (L.f.) Thunb.

Her ashes were scattered in the Cythna Letty Nature Reserve near the small town of Barberton in Mpumalanga. In 1989 the National Botanical Institute published a portfolio of seven prints of flower paintings selected from two journals kept by Cythna's mother, Josina Letty, and housed in the Institute's Mary Gunn Library in Pretoria.

The Botanical Society of South Africa commemorated her by the awarding of the "Cythna Letty Medal",

which is awarded for significant contributions to the promotion of South African flora through the medium of published botanical paintings or drawings.

Plants named for her include Crassula lettyae Phillips and Aloe lettyae Reynolds. She is denoted by the author abbreviation Letty when citing a botanical name .

== Publications ==
- An Introduction to Botany and to a Few Transvaal Veld Flowers (with Verdoorn)(J.L Van Schaik, Pretoria 1920)
- Wild Flowers of the Transvaal (with Dyer, Verdoorn and Codd 1962) ISBN B0007IZSNE
- Trees of South Africa (Tafelberg 1975) ISBN 0-624-00671-9
- Children of the Hours - Indigenous Plants With Peculiar Habits (AD. Donker Ltd 1981) ISBN B000N2D7SM
