= Alice Pegler =

South African botanist & naturalist

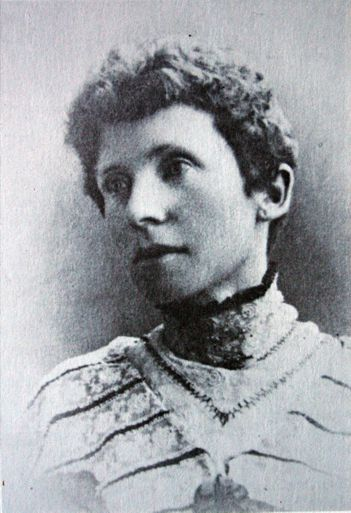
- Alice Pegler
- Born: July 21, 1861; Keiskammahoek
- Died: June 17, 1929 (aged 67); Umtata
- Occupations: Teacher, botanist

Alice Marguerite Pegler (21 July 1861 – 17 June 1929) was a South African teacher and botanical collector.

The daughter of S. Mackin Pegler, Alice was educated at the Dominican Convent in King William's Town. Although trained as a teacher, she abandoned this career and settled at Kentani where she raised and educated her nieces. She suffered health problems throughout her life and endured chronic trouble with her eyesight.

While in Kentani she started an extensive collection of all flora within a radius of 5 miles of the village. Her collecting led to a regular correspondence with botanists such as Peter MacOwan, Harry Bolus, HHW Pearson, Selmar Schonland and Illtyd Buller Pole-Evans. Her meticulous notes on the Kentani plants throughout the seasons were published in Ann. Bol. Herb. 5: 1-32 (1918). She did not confine herself to the flora, but also collected beetles, gall flies, spiders, and scorpions. In 1903, she travelled to the Transvaal and collected between Rustenburg and Johannesburg. Her failing health eventually caused her to specialise in algae and fungi. An enumeration of the fungi she collected in 1911–14 in the Kentani district was published in Ann. Bol. Herb. 2: 184-93 (1918). Bolus paid tribute to her collecting in Vol. 2 of his Orchids of South Africa (1911) and described her as someone "who, in spite of delicate health, has been indefatigable in exploring the flora of her neighbourhood." In the seven years preceding her death, she became a helpless invalid. Her specimens which numbered 2 000 were donated to the South African National Botanical Institute in Pretoria.

In 1912, she was paid the exceptional honour of being made a member of the Linnaean Society. She was commemorated in Aloe peglerae, the genus Peglera Bolus (which became a synonym for Nectaropetalum Engl.), Chironia peglerae Prain, Chionanthus peglerae (C.H. Wr.) Stearn, and the fungi Puccinia pegleriana Doidge, Ravenalia peglerae Pole-Evans, Uromyces peglerae Pole-Evans, Ustilago peglerae Bubak & Syd., and many more.
