= Kathleen Annie Lansdell =

South African botanical artist

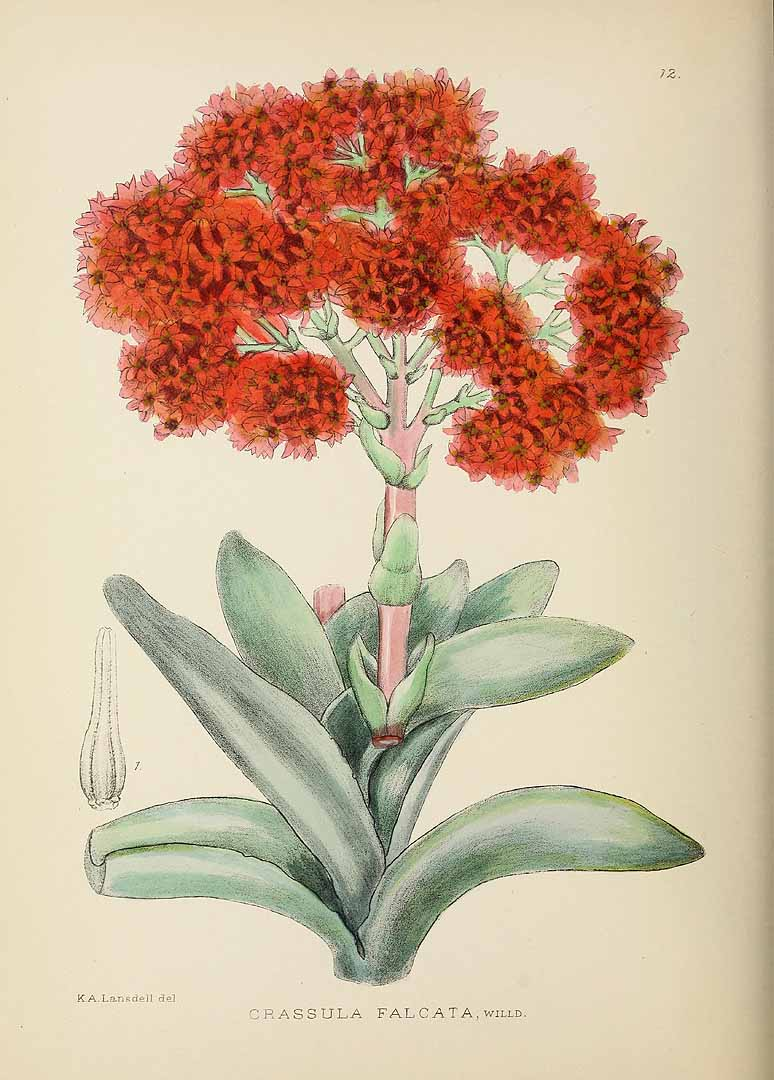
Crassula perfoliata

Kathleen Annie Lansdell (1888 Durban - 3 April 1967 Pietermaritzburg), was a South African botanical artist.

She trained at the Government Art School in Durban and also at the Royal College of Art in South Kensington. She took up an appointment at the Natal Herbarium, located in the grounds of the Durban Botanic Gardens, in about 1915, succeeding Millicent Franks who left in November 1914. She became involved in preparing the illustrations for volume 7 of John Medley Wood's Natal Plants, a volume which remained incomplete and unpublished because of his death in August 1915. Some of the plates were in water colour and still hang in the Natal Herbarium. After 1917 most of her time was spent at the Division of Botany and Plant Pathology in Pretoria, and her work there was a large part of the inspiration for the publication of Flowering Plants of South Africa. She produced a large number of plates for the first volumes published, and volume 35 of 1962 is dedicated to her.

After retiring she settled in Durban and continued painting Natal plants, the Killie Campbell Library receiving a folio of 76 of her paintings in 1962.

== Publications ==
- Wood, John Medley; Evans, Maurice Smethurst (1899). Natal Plants: Descriptions and Figures of Natal Indigenous Plants, with Notes on Their Distribution Economic Value, Native Names, Etc., Etc. Durban: Bennett & Davis.
- Bews, J. W. (1925). Plant Forms and Their Evolution in South Africa: With Map and Illustrations in the Text. London: Longmans, Green.
- "Weeds of South Africa" Journal of Agriculture (Pretoria)
