= Barbara Pike =

South African artist

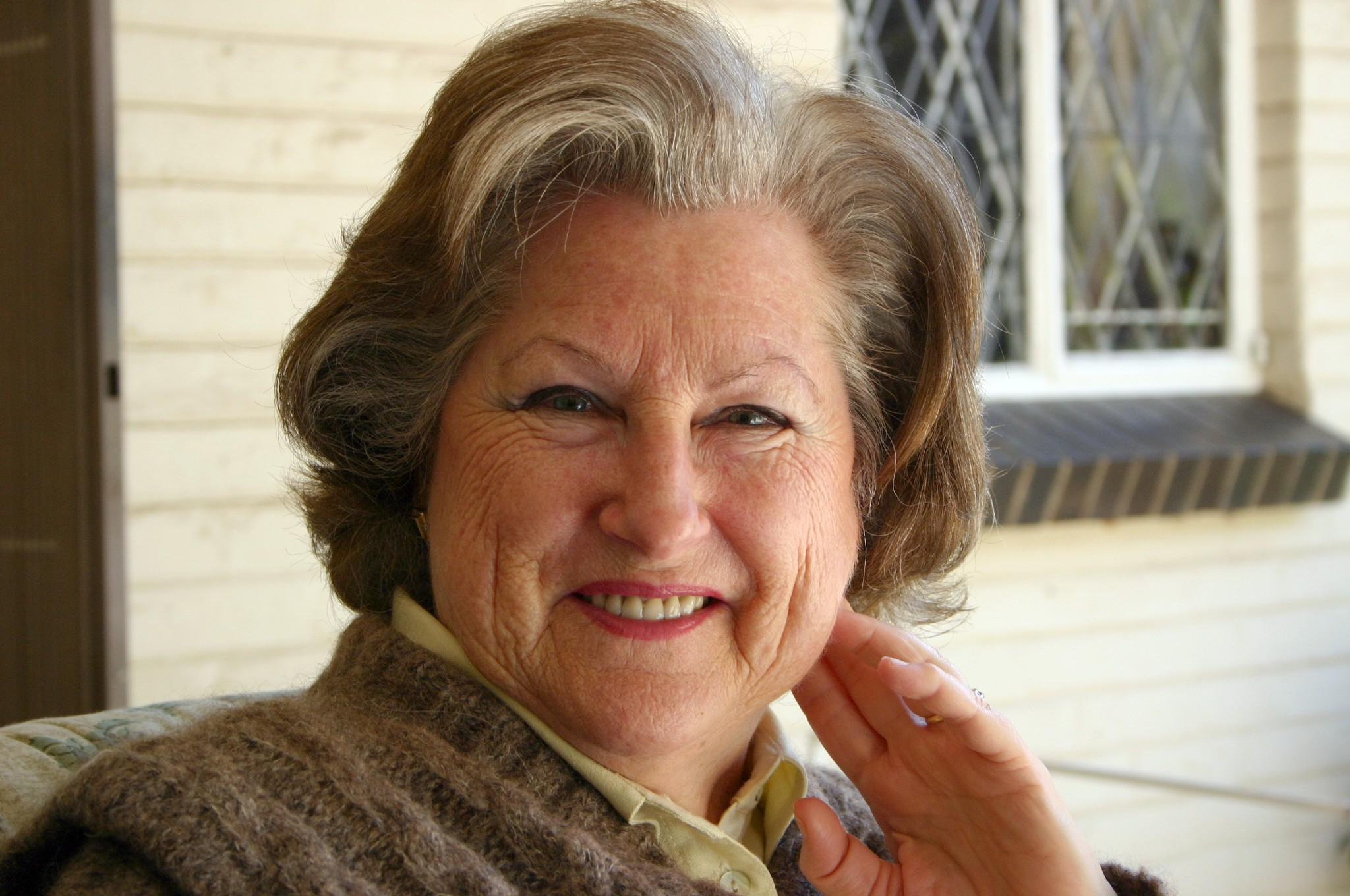
Barbara Pike 2007

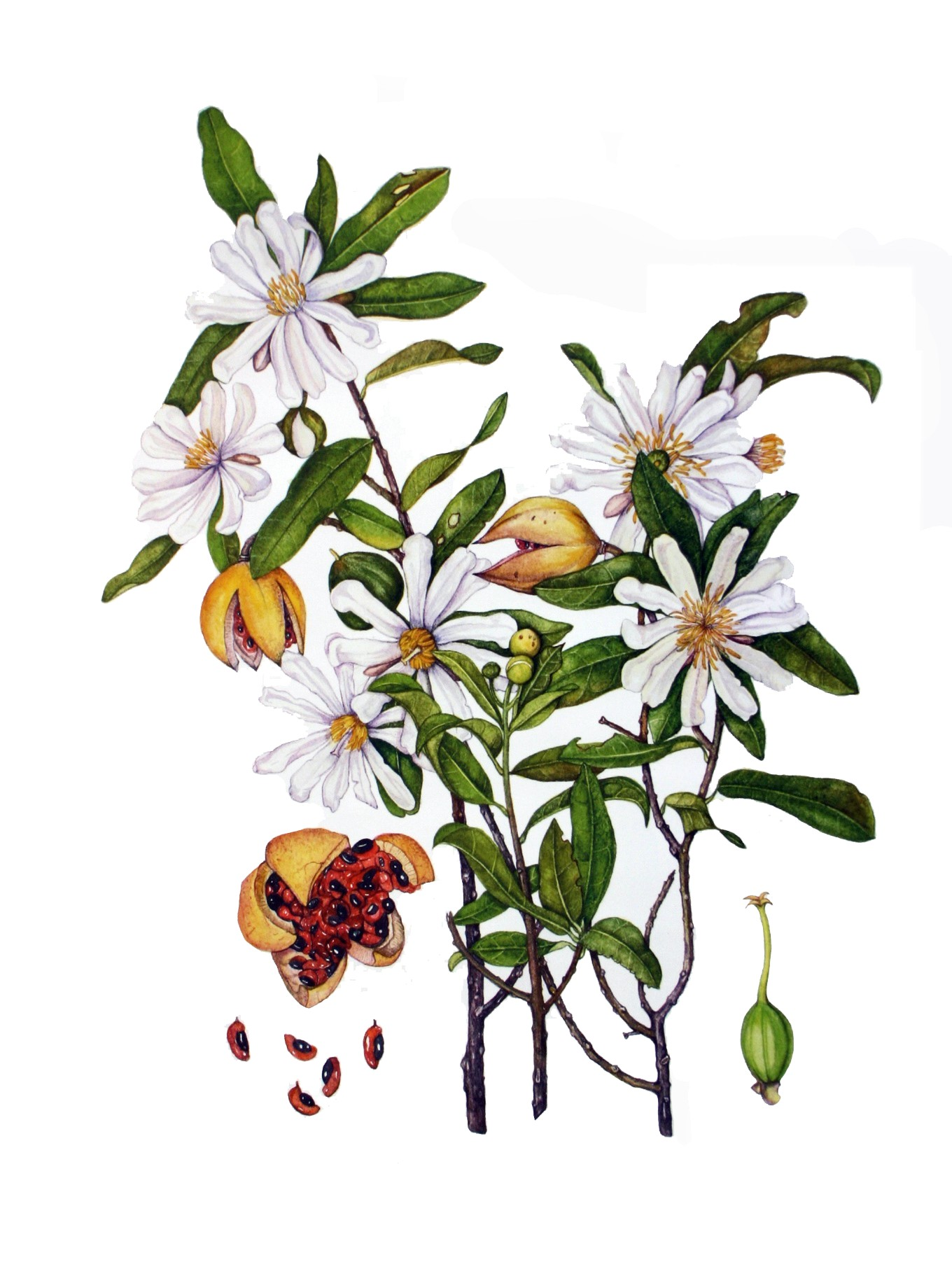
Xylotheca kraussiana Hochst.

Rosalie Barbara Pike (born 29 March 1933) is a South African botanical artist.

== Biography ==
Born in Johannesburg, Barbara Pike is one of two daughters born to Barend Elzas, an industrial chemist, and his wife Klara 'Claire' Kindinger. She attended the Parktown High School for Girls in Johannesburg and matriculated in 1949. She obtained a B.Sc. in botany and zoology at Witwatersrand University in 1952 and went on to a Higher Education Diploma at the Johannesburg College of Education. She worked as biochemist and medical artist at the Department of Surgery and Medicine, Witwatersrand University from 1953 to 1955. In 1956 she worked as biochemist for the Department of Water Research at the CSIR in Johannesburg. After this she returned to Witwatersrand University once again to take up the post of botanical illustrator for the Botany Department between the years 1957 to 1985. The Geological Survey Museum in Pretoria employed her as an artist in 1985.

Barbara was married to Merrill Andrew Pike and had two sons, Andrew John Pike 1958 and Richard Linden Pike 1961. She currently lives in Parkwood, Johannesburg.

== Works ==
=== Awards ===
Her first award was in 1945 at the National Eisteddfod when she won first place in the category 'illustration under 12 years of age'. She was awarded silver medals by Kirstenbosch in 2000 and 2004, gold medals in 2002 and 2006.

=== Publications ===
- 1971 Wild Flowers of the Witwatersrand - with Annabelle Lucas (Purnell, Cape Town)
- 1973 Ferns of the Witwatersrand - with Florence Hancock, Annabelle Lucas & Patsy-Lynne Edkins (Wits University Press, Johannesburg) ISBN 0-85494-196-7

Her artwork has appeared in:

- 1958 A Natural History of Inhaca Island, Moçambique - with W McNae and M Kalk (Wits University Press)
- 1970 Flora of Melville Koppies (Johannesburg Council for Natural History)
- 2000 Fedsure calendar
- 2001 A Passion for Plants:Contemporary Botanical Masterpieces - Shirley Sherwood (Cassell, London) ISBN 0-304-35828-2
- 2001 South African Botanical Art : Peeling Back the Petals (Fernwood Press) ISBN 1-874950-54-7
- Paintings in the Blue Train, Fedsure Collection and in private collections worldwide.
