= Illtyd Buller Pole-Evans =

South African botanist and mycologist (1879–1968)

- Born: 3 September 1879; Llanmaes, Wales
- Died: 16 October 1968 (aged 89); Umtali, Rhodesia
- Education: University College of South Wales and Monmouthshire, Cambridge University
- Spouse: Mary R.H. Thompson
- Awards: Order of St Michael and St George
- Scientific career
- Fields: Botanist
- Author abbrev. (botany): Pole-Evans

Illtyd Buller Pole-Evans (3 September 1879 – 16 October 1968) was a Welsh-born South African botanist. Sometimes his first name is spelled Iltyd.

== Biography ==
Pole-Evans was born in Llanmaes in the Vale of Glamorgan, the son of an Anglican clergyman, Daniel Evans and Caroline Jane Pole. He was educated at the University College of South Wales and Monmouthshire, receiving a BSc in 1903 and going on to Cambridge where he studied mycology and plant pathology under Harry Marshall Ward FRS, obtaining an MA in 1905.

Pole-Evans was appointed as mycologist and plant pathologist, and joined Burtt Davy in the newly established Transvaal Department of Agriculture. Although having the most rudimentary laboratory facilities, Pole-Evans implemented a research program and started producing a steady flow of published work. He assumed charge of the Division of Mycology and Plant Pathology in 1912, which later became part of the Division of Botany and Plant Pathology.

After settling in Pretoria, Pole-Evans turned his attention to the rich flora of his adopted country and singled out the Aloes for special attention. He amassed a collection of great value and established the plants on the grounds of the Division. Some new Aloe species were described by him in the Trans. Roy. Soc. S. Afr. of 1915 and 1917.

In 1916 an outbreak of citrus canker threatened to bring down the citrus industry in the Transvaal. Pole-Evans orchestrated a drastic program that called for the complete eradication of infected orchards and nurseries. This timely intervention saved the industry.

During his travels throughout southern Africa, he collected photographs and data on the major vegetation types of the region. This resulted in a preliminary account entitled "The Plant Geography of South Africa", in which he recognised 19 botanical regions, each with distinctive ecological characteristics. His classification, with its accompanying 1:3,000,000 vegetation map, remained the standard reference work until replaced by Acocks' system in 1953. He initiated the Botanical Survey Advisory Committee which led to the serial publication of the Botanical Survey Memoirs, first appearing in 1919. He also introduced the Flowering Plants of South Africa in 1920 and Bothalia in 1921.

One of his longstanding interests was pasture grasses, and he was instrumental in collecting and introducing many of these to South Africa from various places on the sub-continent. These grasses were grown and tested at the Prinshof and Rietondale Experiment Stations.

In 1930 Pole-Evans accompanied John Hutchinson and Jan Smuts on a two-month expedition through Southern and Northern Rhodesia to Nyasaland and Lake Tanganyika. A more ambitious expedition was undertaken by him in 1938 at the invitation of the Kenyan government. In the company of C. J. J. van Rensburg, an agrostologist, and J. Erens, a plant and seed collector, he set off on a four-month odyssey covering some 20,000 km (12,000 mi). On this trip they travelled through Southern Rhodesia and Tanganyika to Kenya, going as far north as the border with Sudan and Abyssinia, returning through Uganda, the Ruwenzoris and the Belgian Congo. His account of this expedition was published in Botanical Survey Memoir No. 22 of 1948.

During his career, Pole-Evans collected extensively in southern Africa and covered the Belgian Congo, Kenya, Tanganyika, Northern Rhodesia, the Bechuanaland Protectorate, South Africa and Southern Rhodesia. His collections can be found at A, B, BOL, BR, E, EA, GRA, K, L, MO, P, PRE, S, SRGH and US. This botanist is denoted by the author abbreviation Pole-Evans when citing a botanical name. His dedication to botany in the service of the Department of Agriculture, set a high standard for a whole generation of South African botanists, inspiring an unparalleled expansion in the country's botanical science. The National Herbarium, which had started with the small collection of Burtt Davy, grew rapidly with the acquisition of the collections of Ernest Edward Galpin, Anna Dieterlen (1859–1945), Henry George Flanagan (1861–1919), Rudolf Marloth, Alice Pegler (1861–1929), William Tyson (1851–1920) and the bryophytes of Thomas Robertson Sim. Pole-Evans was instrumental in extending the ill-fated Dongola Reserve which had been created in the Northern Transvaal in the 1920s, and was scrapped by the new Government of 1948. In 1955 he retired to Umtali in Rhodesia, where he continued his botanical collecting.

Pole-Evans died in Umtali, Rhodesia, at the age of 89.

== Personal life ==
He married Mary R.H. Thompson MSc (London) in 1922, three years after she joined his staff as a mycologist.

== Legacy ==
Pole-Evans is commemorated by the grass genus Polevansia De Winter, and by numerous specific names such as Aloe pole-evansii, Dinteranthus pole-evansii, Gladiolus pole-evansii etc., as well as Volume 20 of Flowering Plants of South Africa. Scadoxus pole-evansii is named for his son, Reginald.

=== Memberships, honours and awards ===
- Fellow of the Linnean Society of London
- Fellow of the Royal Society of South Africa
- Foundation member of SA Biological Society
- 1911, 1919, 1926 President of SA Biological Society
- 1916 President of Section C of SA Association for the Advancement of Science
- 1920 President of SA Association for the Advancement of Science
- 1922 Medal & Grant from SA Association for the Advancement of Science
- 1921 Companion of the Order of St Michael and St George
- LLD(honorary) from Witwatersrand University
