= Anna Amelia Obermeyer =

South African botanist (1907–2001)

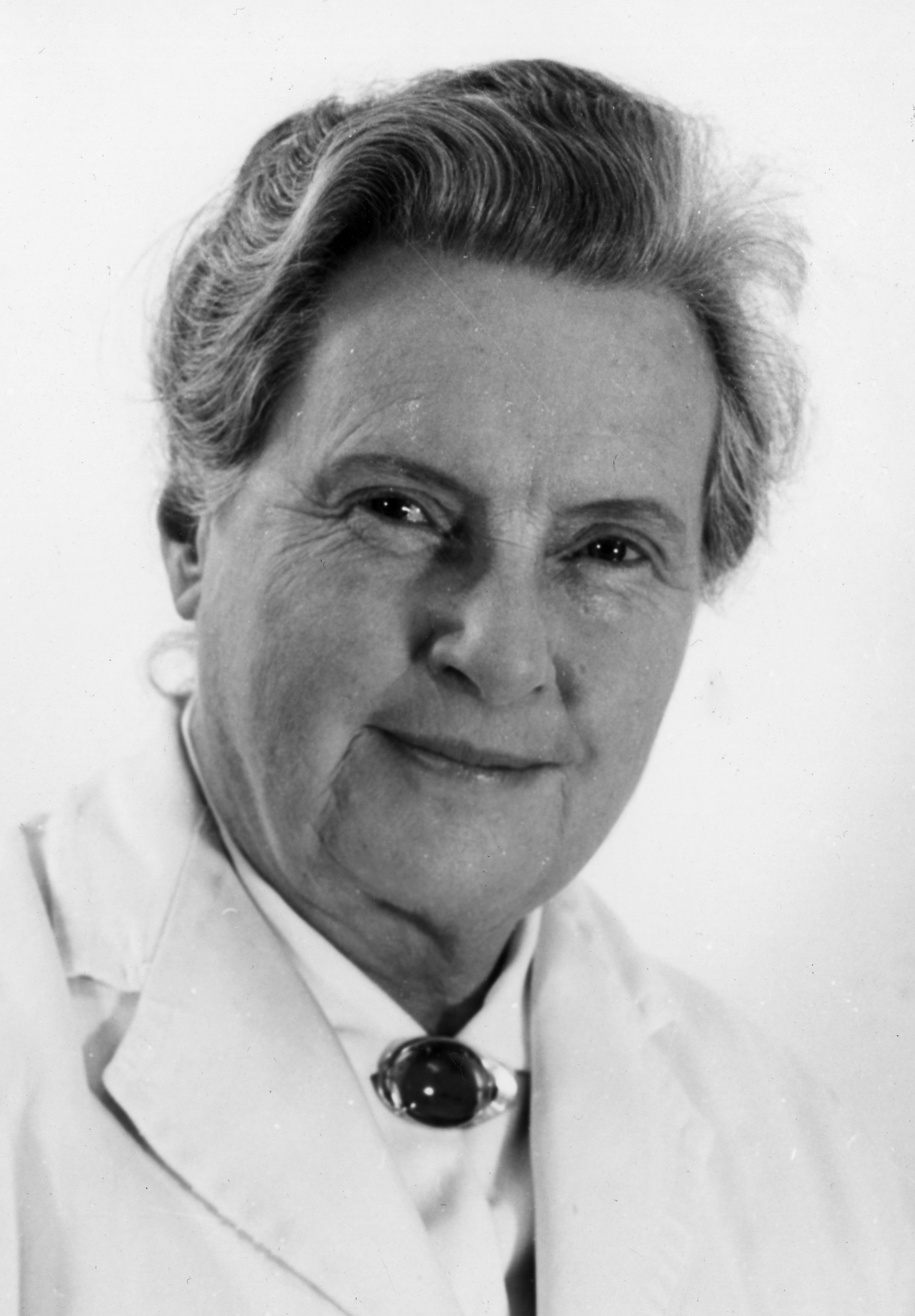
- Born: 30 July 1907; Pretoria
- Died: 10 October 2001 (aged 94); Cape Town
- Education: Oost Eind School, Pretoria
- Alma mater: Transvaal University College, Pretoria
- Known for: Gladiolus
- Spouse: Anton Mauve
- Scientific career
- Academic advisors: C.E.B. Bremekamp

Anna Amelia Mauve (née Obermeyer) (1907–2001) was a South African botanist who worked at the Botanical Research Institute in Pretoria. She catalogued more than 4,000 plant specimens from the Kalahari and Soutpansberg regions. She made major contributions to the journals Flowering Plants of Africa and Bothalia.

== Early life and career ==
Obermeyer was born on 30 July 1907 in Pretoria and attended Oost Eind Skool (East End School). She obtained her BSc in 1928 and MSc in 1931 from the Transvaal University College, Pretoria, under C.E.B Bremekamp. She was appointed botanist in the Transvaal Museum from 1929 to 1938.

She married Anton Mauve in 1938 and did not return to her professional career until 1957 when she joined the National Herbarium. She had, in effect, returned to her original job as the botanical collections of the Transvaal Museum had been transferred to the National Herbarium in 1953.

Her area of responsibility at the National Herbarium was petaloid monocots and she retained this position until she reached retirement age in July 1972. In October 1972, after a brief vacation, she returned to the National Herbarium in a temporary capacity and, twelve years later, in 1984 she was promoted to Temporary senior agricultural researcher. In August 1985 she finally retired and moved to Pinelands, Cape Town. She died on 10 October 2001 in Cape Town.

== Areas of study ==
At the Transvaal Museum she worked mostly on Acanthaceae and in particular Barleria, Blepharis and Petalidium. She catalogued a large collection of plants from the Vernay-Lang expedition to the Kalahari, creating one of the first records of the flora of this region. She was also part of an expedition, with Schweickerdt and Verdoorn, to the Soutpansberg Salt Pan and wrote an account of the specimens of flora collected.

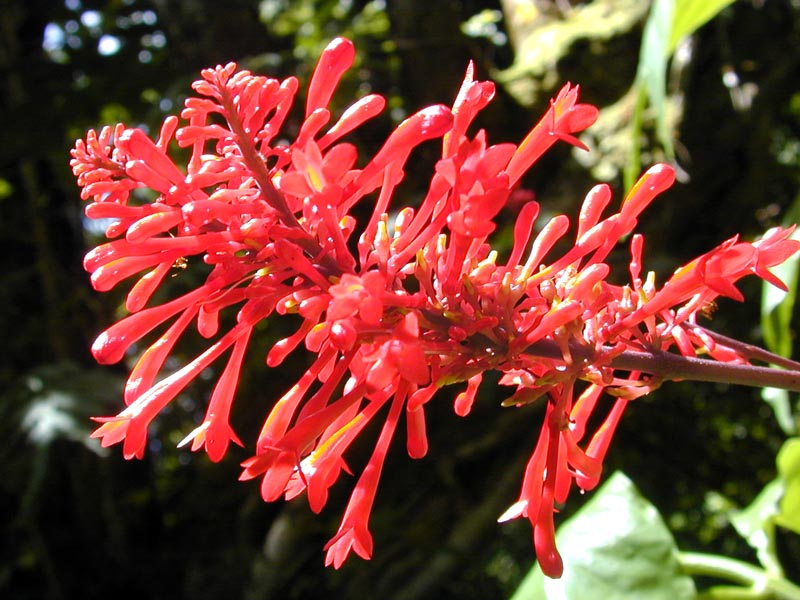
Acanthaceae

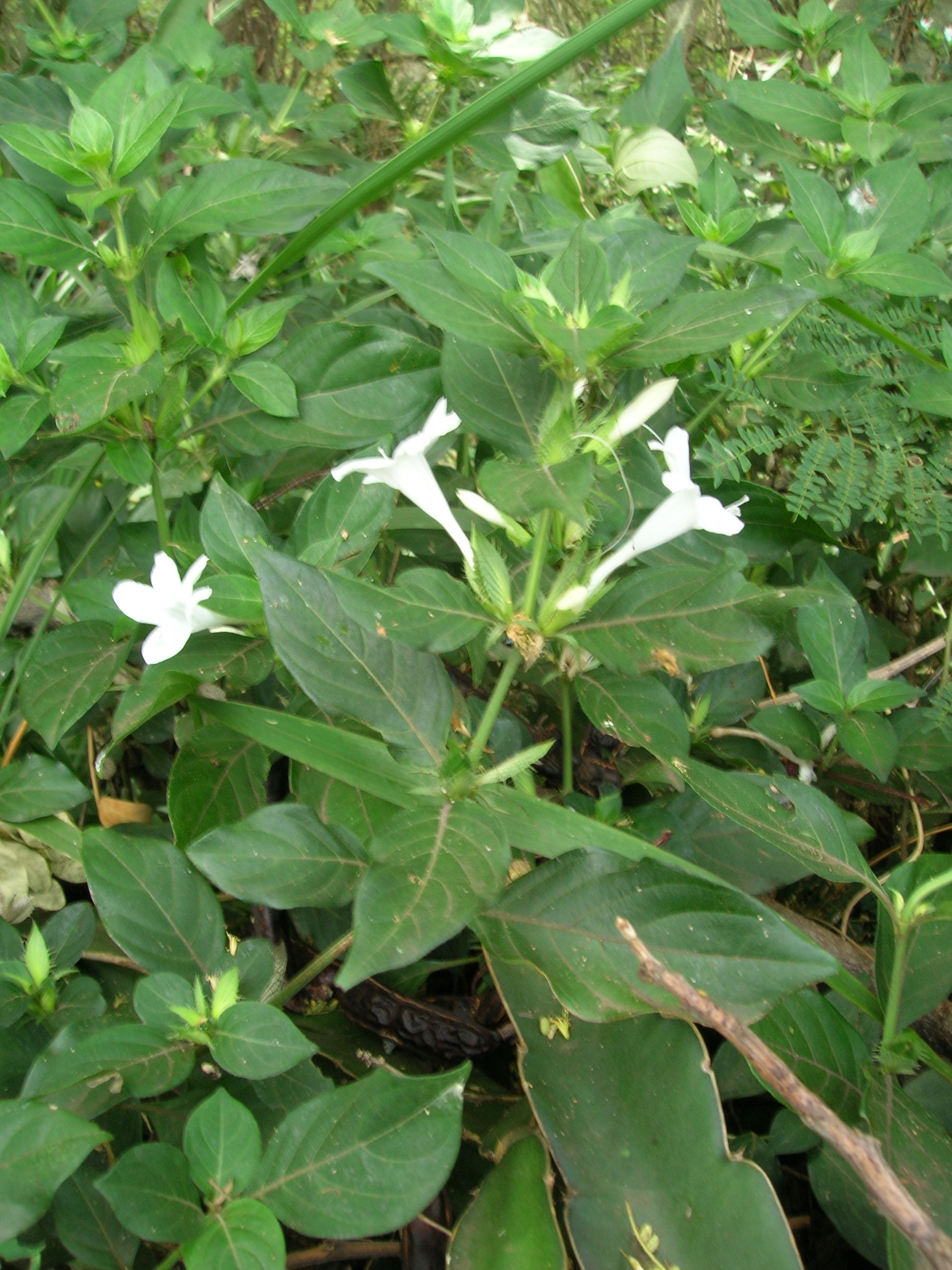
Barleria

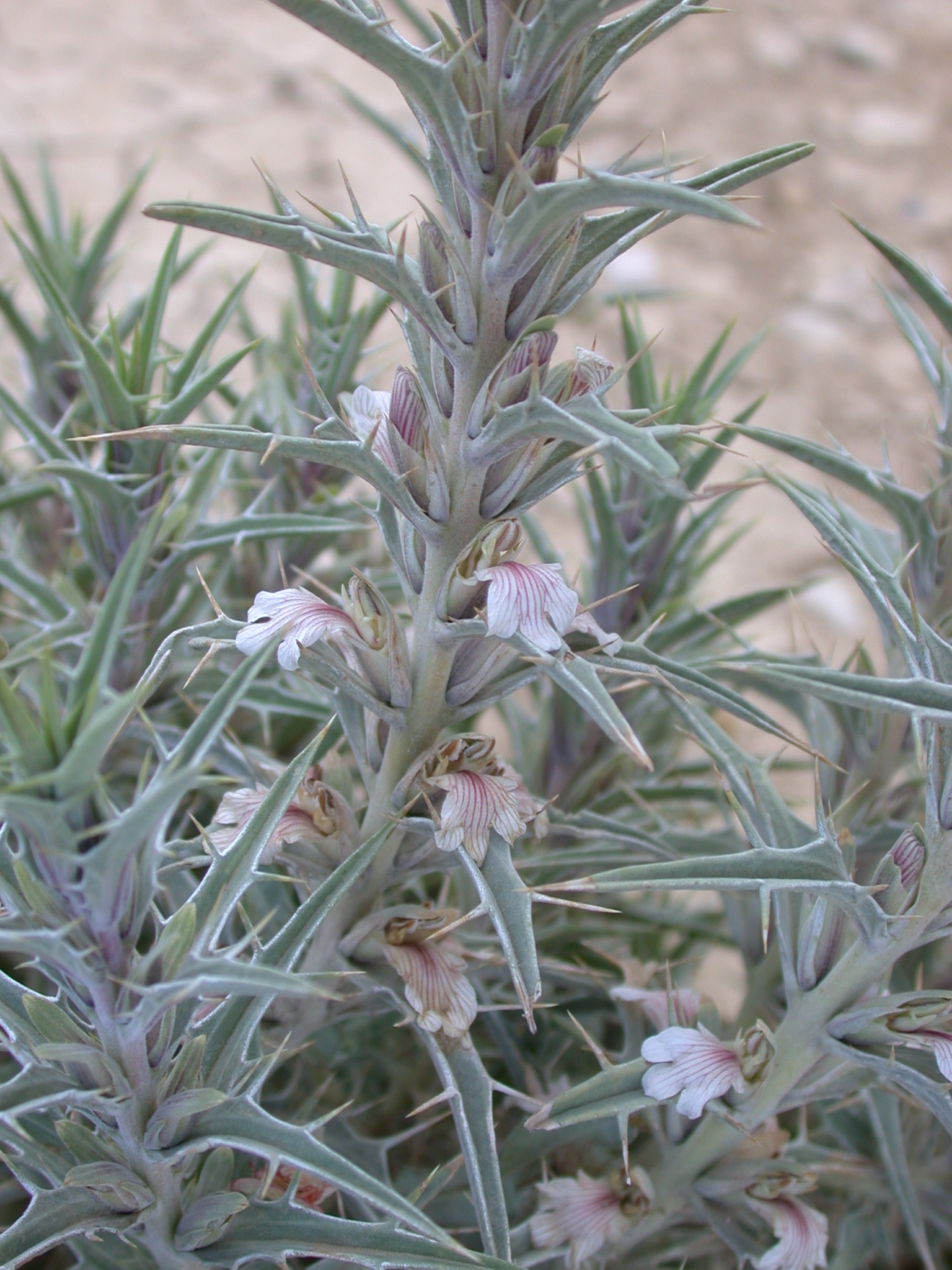
Blepharis

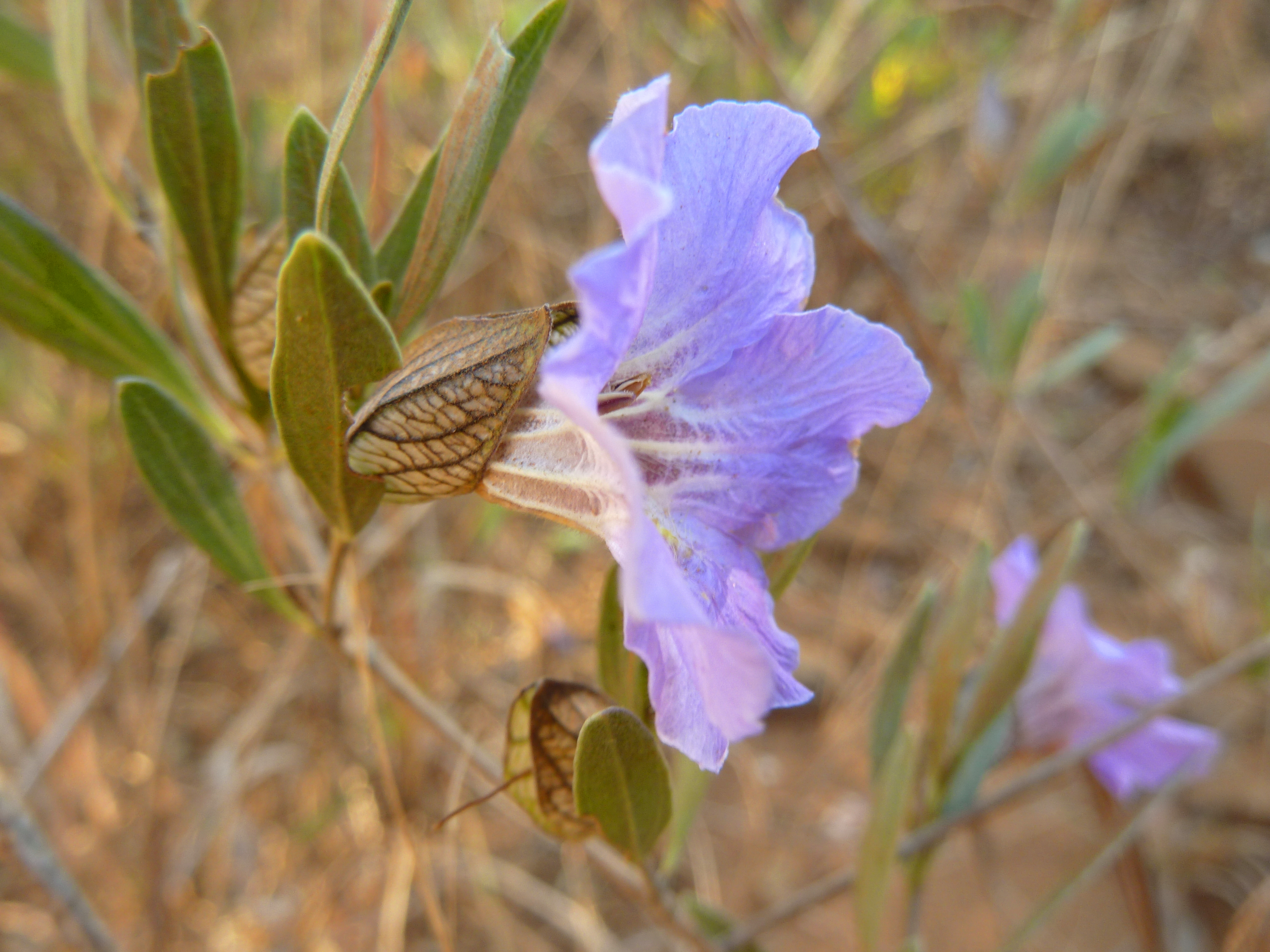
Petalidium

In 1957 she started working on petaloid monocots, describing individual new species and she provided texts for images published in the journal Flowering Plants of Africa. Volume 42 of this journal was dedicated to her. She also completed revisions of Anthericum, Dipcadi and Lagarosiphon. She collected more than 4,000 specimens on various field trips in South Africa and Rhodesia (now Zimbabwe) in the company of V.F.M. FitzSimons.

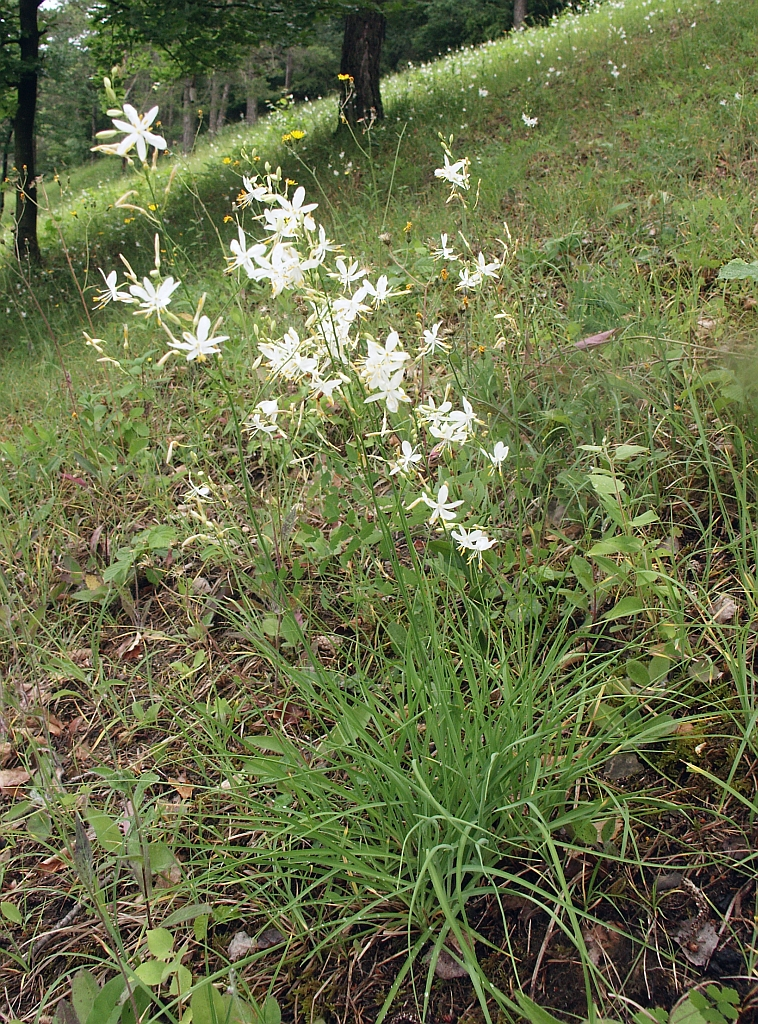
Anthericum

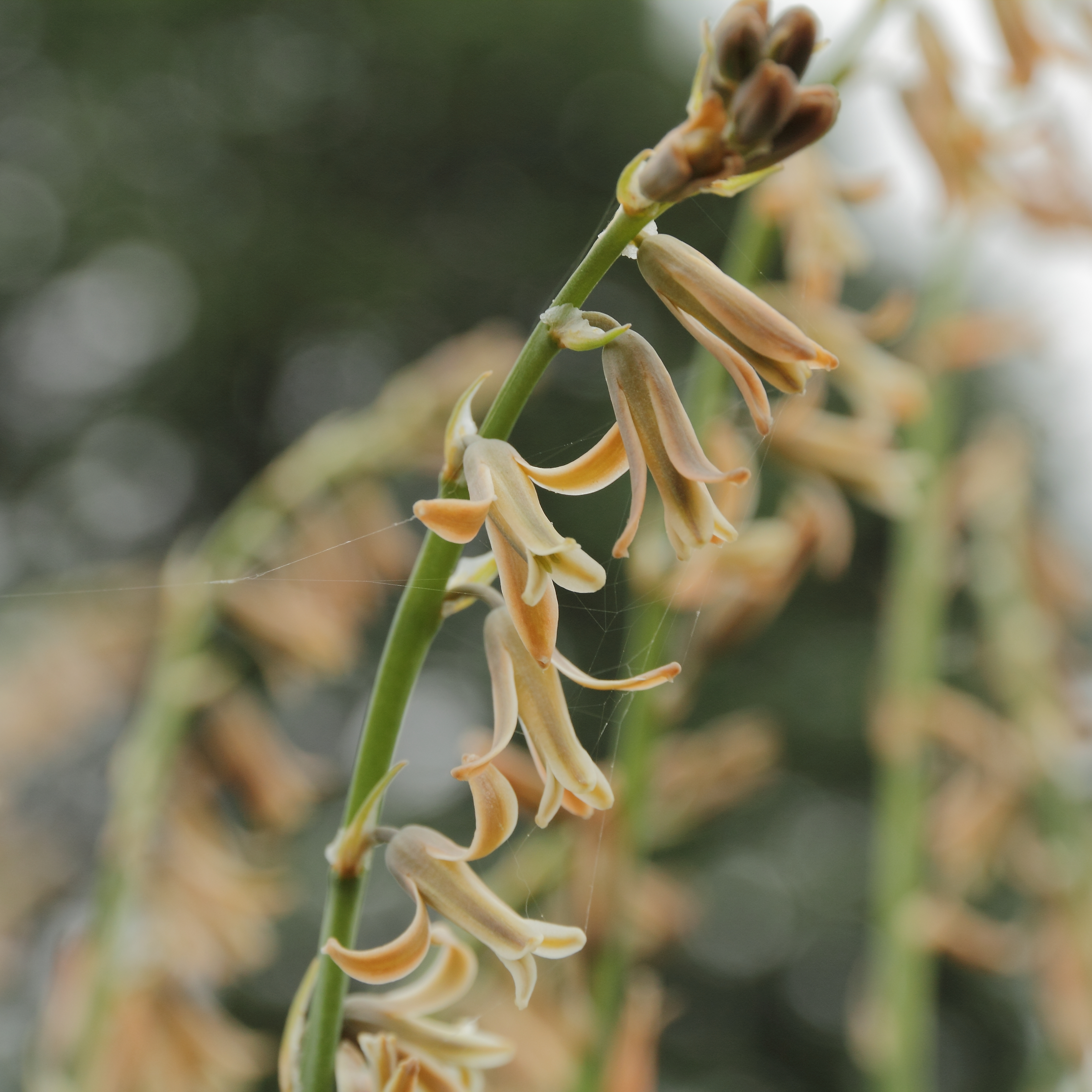
Dipcadi

== Awards and honours ==
She was awarded the South African Association of Botanists (SAAB) senior medal for botany with the citation that she had made more contributions to that project than any other single botanist. She was a member of the South African Biological Society and edited the journal of the South African Biological Society. She was a founding member of the South African Association of Botanists, a member of Association pour l'Étude Taxonomique de la Flore d'Afrique Tropicale (AETFAT) and a member of S_{2}A_{3} (the South African Association for the Advancement of Science).

== Eponyms ==
Obermeyer is commemorated in the following plant names:

- Asparagus obermeyerae
- Barleria ameliae
- Blepharis obermeyerae
- Hemizygia obermeyerae
- Lachenalia ameliae

== Selected publications ==
Some of the more than 4,000 specimens of flora catalogued by Obermeyer are covered in the following list of publications:

- Bremekamp, C.E.B. & Obermeyer, A.A. 1935 Serum Kalahariense, a list of plants collected. Annals of the Transvaal Museum 16: 399-442
- Ellis, R.P., Manders, R. & Obermeyer, A.A. 1979. Anatomical observations on the peduncle of Xyris capensis (Xyridaceae). Bothalia 12: 637-639.
- Lewis, G.J., Obermeyer, A.A. & Barnard, T.T. 1972. Gladiolus: a revision of the South African species. Journal of South African Botany, Suppl. vol. 10: 1-316.
- Lewis, J. & Obermeyer, A.A. 1985. Xyridaceae. Flora of southern Africa 4,2: 1-8.
- Mauve A.A. 1966a. Flowering aquatic plants in South Africa. Fauna & Flora 17: 19-23.
- Mauve A.A. 1967. Water-lilies in South Africa. Fauna & Flora 18: 31-35.
- Obermeyer, A.A. 1959. Petalidium bracteatum. The Flowering Plants of Africa 33: t. 1317
- Obermeyer, A.A. 1933a. Notes on the distribution of Copaifera mopane Kirk. South African Journal of Science 30: 266-269.
- Obermeyer, A.A. 1960. Choananthus cyrtanthiflorus. The Flowering Plants of Africa 34: t. 1340.
- Obermeyer, A.A. 1961a. Notes and new records of South African plants: Barleria argillicola Oberm. Bothalia 7: 444, 445.
- Obermeyer, A.A. 1962a. A revision of the South African species of Anthericum, Chlorophytum and Trachyandra. Bothalia 7: 669-767.
- Obermeyer, A.A. 1963a. A new Haemanthus and a new Tritonia from southern Africa. Kirkia 3: 22-24.
- Obermeyer, A.A. 1964a. Aponogeton. Journal of the Limnological Society of South Africa 1: 12. 13.
- Obermeyer, A.A.1965a. Potamogeton. Journal of the Limnological Society of South Africa 2: 27-35.
- Obermeyer, A.A. 1967a. Two new species of Bulbine (Liliaceae). Bothalia 9: 342-344.
- Obermeyer, A.A. 1968a. Dietes vegeta. The Flowering Plants of Africa 39: t. 1524.
- Obermeyer, A.A. 1970a. Droseraceae. Rondulaceae. Podostemaceae. Flydrostachyaceae. Flora of southern Africa 13: 187-213.
- Obermeyer, A.A. 1971a. Two new Ornithogalum species from South-West Africa. Bothalia 10: 355-358.
- Obermeyer, A.A. 1972a. Clivia gardenii. The Flowering Plants of Africa 42: t. 1641.
- Obermeyer, A.A. 1973a. A note on Laurembergia repens (Flalorrhagidaceae). Bothalia 11: 116. 117.
- Obermeyer, A.A. 1974a. New taxa in the Tumeraceae. Bothalia 11: 288-290.
- Obermeyer, A.A. 1976a. Elatinaceae. Frankeniaceae. Tamaricaceae. Flora of southern Africa 22: 23-39.
- Obermeyer, A.A. 1977a. Babiana pygmaea. The Flowering Plants of Africa 44: t. 1731
- Obermeyer, A.A. 1978a. Ornithogalum: a revision of the southern African species. Bothalia 12: 323-376.
- Obermeyer, A.A. 1980a. The genus Sypharissa (Liliaceae). Bothalia 13: 111-114.
- Obermeyer, A.A. 1981a. A new species of Strumaria (Amarvllidaceae). Bothalia 13' 435.
- Obermeyer, A.A. 1982a. A new species of Gladiolus (Iridaceae). Bothalia 14: 78.
- Obermeyer, A.A. 1984. Revision of the genus Myrsiphyllum Willd. (Liliaceae). Bothalia 15: 77-88.
- Obermeyer, A.A. 1985a. The genus Protasparagus (Asparagaceae) in southern Africa. Bothalia 15: 548, 549.
- Obermeyer, A.A. 1992a. Sansevieria. Flora of southern Africa 5,3: 5-9.
- Obermeyer, A.A. & Bogner, J. 1979. Gonatopus rhizomatosus. The Flowering Plants of Africa 45: t. 1782.
- Obermeyer, A.A. & Du Toit, P.C.V. 1976. Ochnaeeae. Flora of southern Africa 22: 1-13.
- Obermeyer, A.A. & Faden, R.B. 1985. Commelinaceae. Flora of southern Africa 4,2: 23-60.
- Obermeyer, A.A. & Immelman, K.L. 1992. Asparagaceae. Flora of southern Africa 5,3: 11-82.
- Obermeyer, A.A. & Nicholas, A. 1984. Drosera hurkeana. The Flowering Plants of Africa 48: t. 1886.
- Obermeyer, A.A., Schweickerdt, H.G. & Verdoorn, I.C. 1937. An enumeration of plants collected in the northern Transvaal. Bothalia 3: 223-258.
- Obermeyer, A.A. & Strey, R.G. 1969. A new species of Raphia from northern Zululand and Mozambique (Arecaceae). Bothalia 10: 29-37.

== See also ==
Gunn, M.; Codd, L.E.W. (1981). Codd, L.E.W. (ed.). Botanical Exploration Southern Africa (illustrated ed.). CRC Press. p. 264. ISBN 9780869611296.
