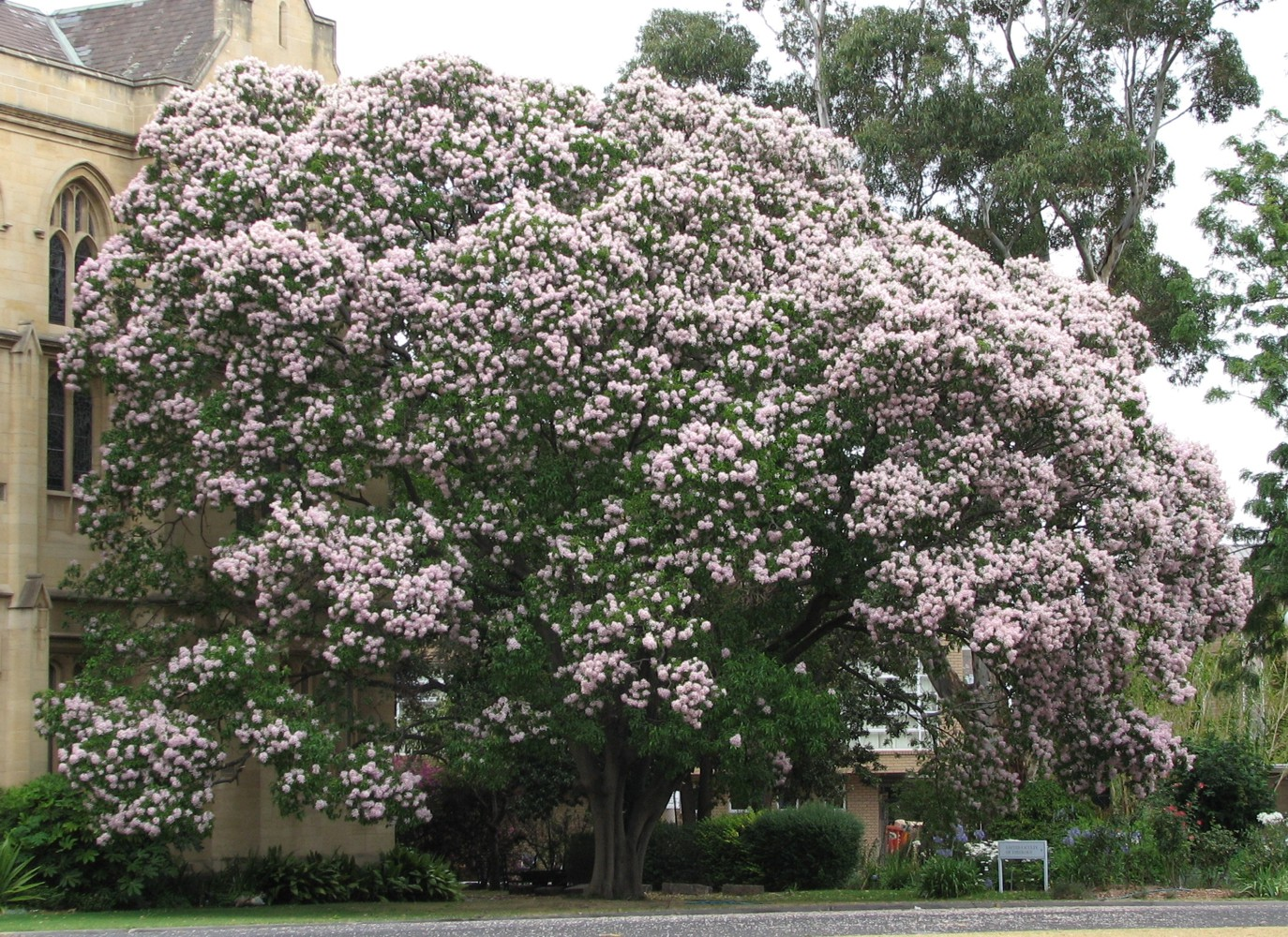

Scientific classification
- Kingdom: Plantae
- Clade: Tracheophytes
- Clade: Angiosperms
- Clade: Eudicots
- Clade: Rosids
- Order: Sapindales
- Family: Rutaceae
- Genus: Calodendrum
- Species: C. capense

Binomial name
- Calodendrum capense (L.f.) Thunb.

= Calodendrum capense =

Cape chestnut

Species of tree

Calodendrum capense, the Cape chestnut, is an African tree which was first studied at The Cape in South Africa and cultivated widely for its prolific flower display. The tree obtained the common name of "Cape chestnut" because explorer William Burchell saw a resemblance to the horse chestnut in terms of flowers and fruit, though the two are not closely related.

== Range ==
It is native to a swath of the east side of the continent from the equatorial highlands of Kenya at its northern limit southwards through isolated mountains in Tanzania to both sides of Lake Malawi, the Mashonaland Plateau and Eastern Highlands of Zimbabwe, and then along the lower slopes of the Drakensberg Mountains of South Africa and in coastal forests from Gqeberha to Cape Town.

== Habit ==
The tree can reach 20 metres high in a forest, but in cultivation it is more likely to reach 10 metres, with a spreading canopy.

== Bark and flowers ==
The trunk is smooth and grey and the leaves are ovate up to 22 cm long and 10 cm wide. The large pink flowers are produced in terminal panicles and cover the tree canopy in the early summer.

== Uses ==
Cape chestnut oil, obtained from the seeds, otherwise known as Yangu oil, is a popular oil in African skin care. Its inherent ultraviolet protection, its high content of essential fatty acids and antioxidants and its mild odour destined it for natural cosmetics. The seeds are eaten by birds and monkeys.

== Gallery ==
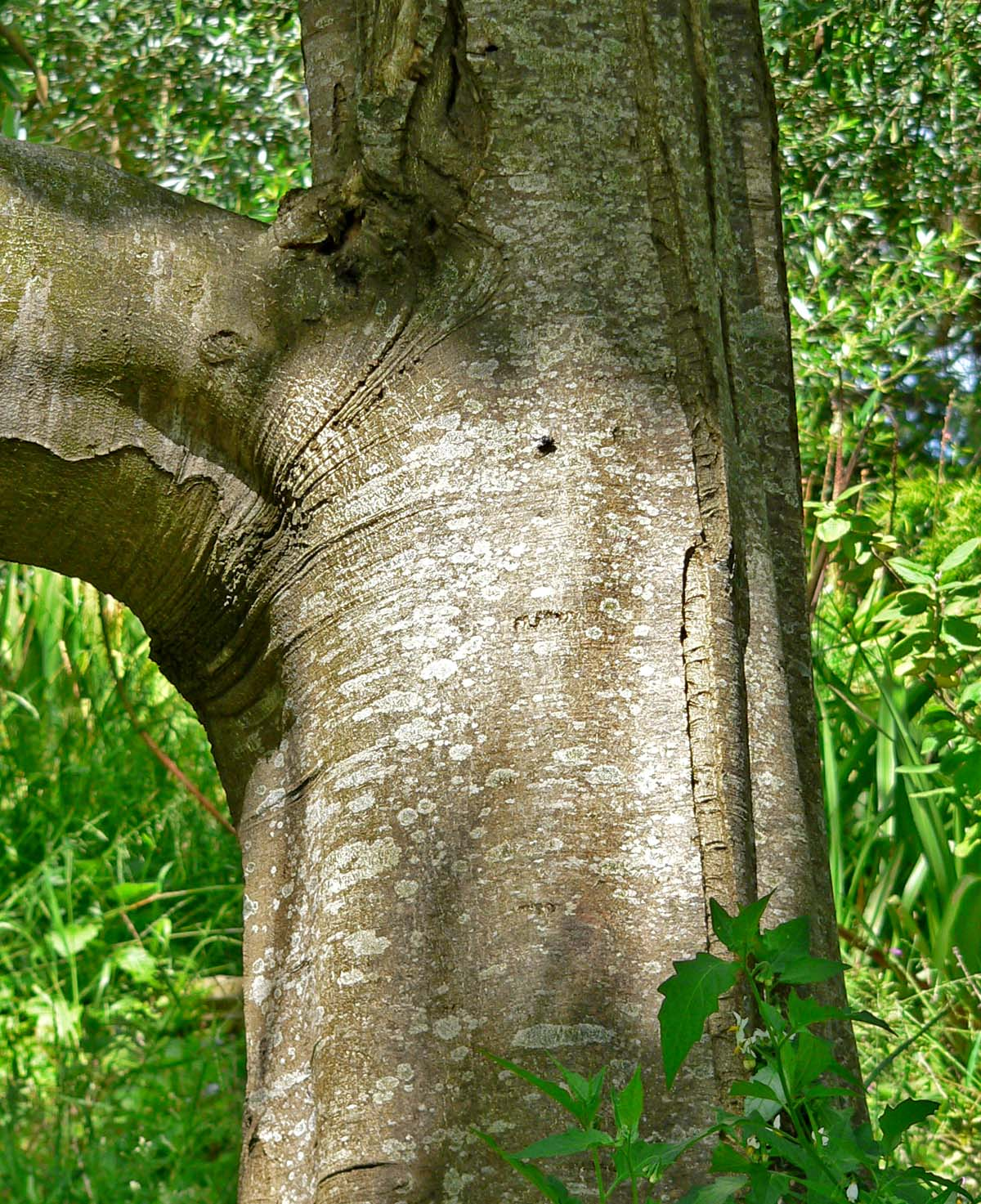
Bark texture

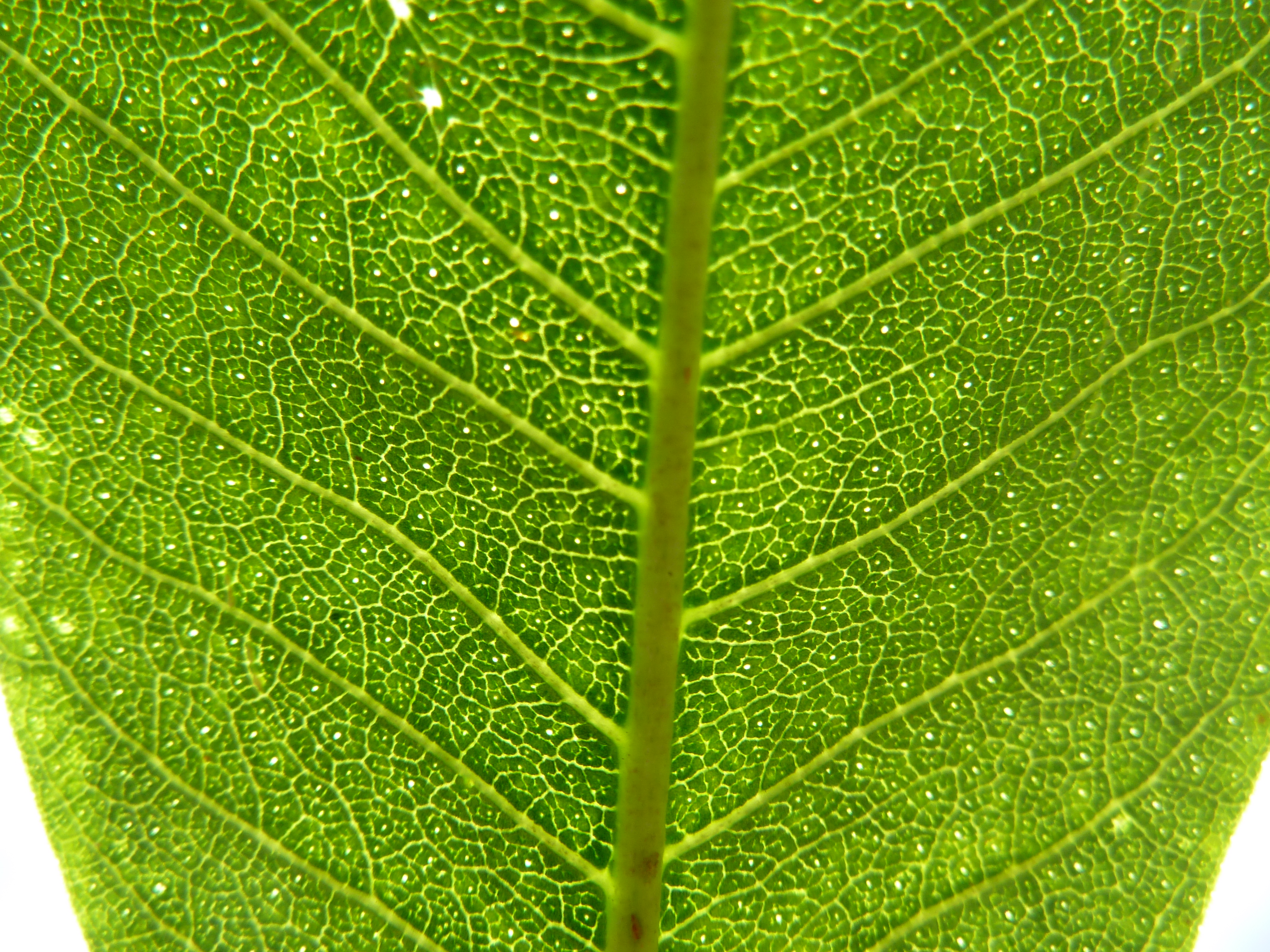
Secretory cavities in leaf

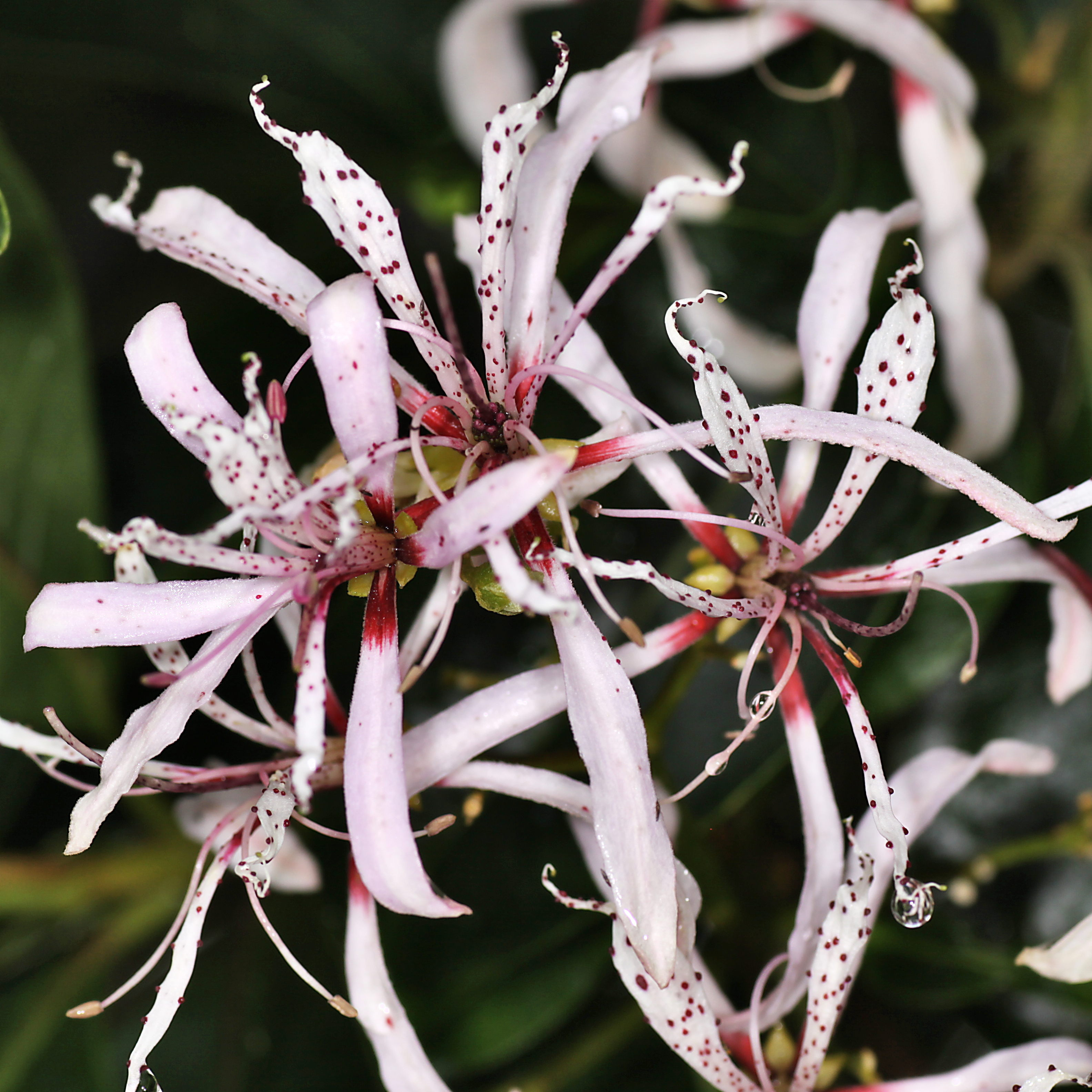
flowers

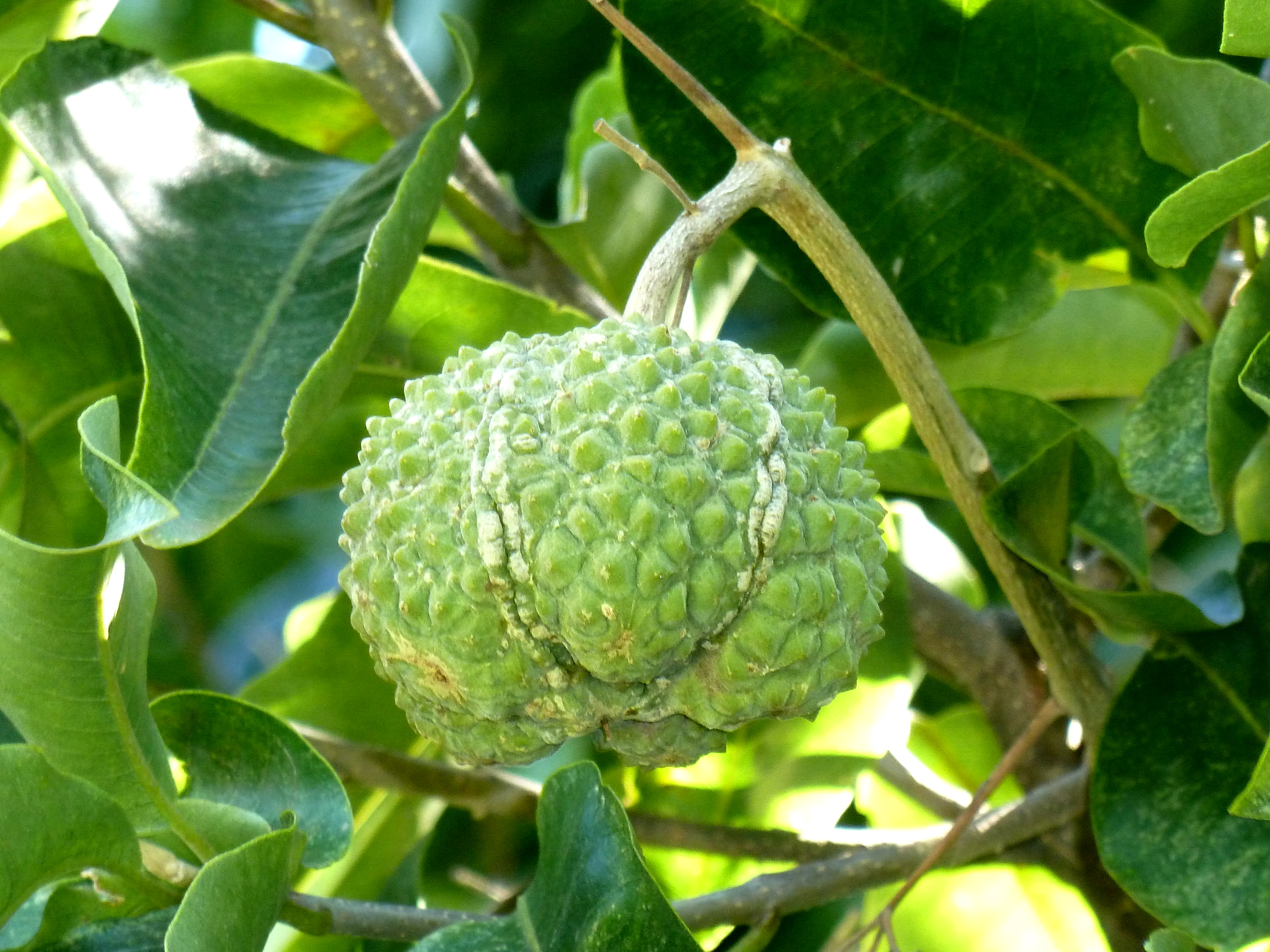
green fruit capsule

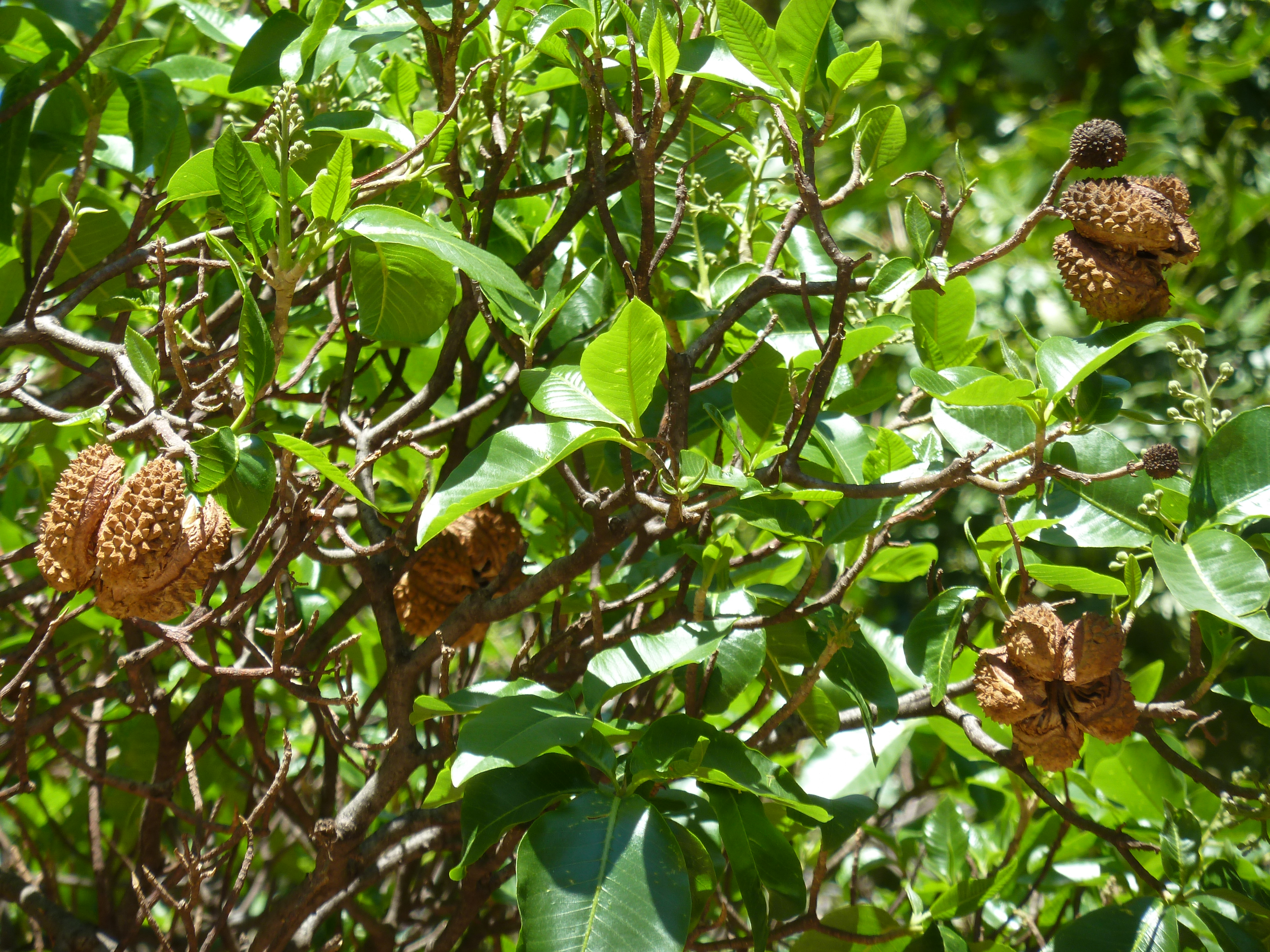
dry fruit capsules

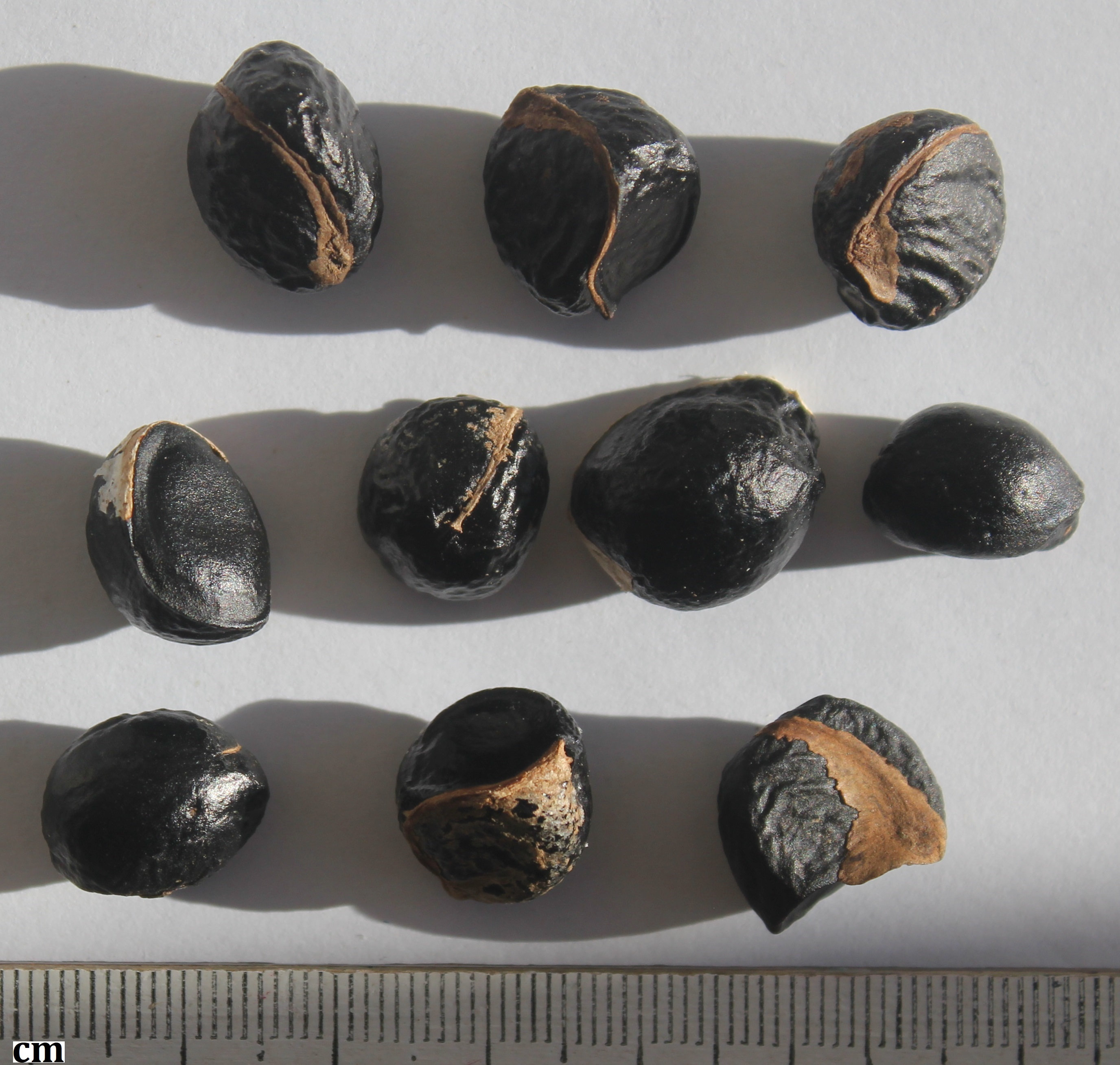
Seeds
