= List of women botanical illustrators =

This is a list of notable women botanical illustrators and artists.

== A ==
- Elfriede Abbe (1919–2012), American sculptor, engraver, illustrator
- Harriet Isabel Adams (fl. 1906–1910)
- Nancy Adams (1926–2007), New Zealand botanical artist, botanist, and museum curator
- Beverly Allen (born 1945), Australian artist
- Mary Morton Allport (1806–1895), English Australian artist, lithographer, etcher, and engraver
- Blanche Ames Ames (1878–1969), American artist, activist, suffragist, and inventor
- Lady Mabel Annesley (1881–1959), wood-engraver and watercolour painter
- Margaret Neilson Armstrong (1867–1944), American designer and illustrator
- Mary Ann Armstrong (1838–1910), British botanical fern artist
- Mary Daisy Arnold (c. 1873–1955), botanical artist
- Alison Marjorie Ashby (1901–1987), Australian botanical artist and plant collector
- Louisa Atkinson (1834–1872), Australian botanical artist, illustrator, naturalist and writer

== B ==
- Clarissa Munger Badger (1806–1889), American botanical illustrator and poet
- Anne Elizabeth Ball (1808–1872), Irish botanist and algologist
- Mary Elizabeth Banning (1822–1903), American mycologist and botanical illustrator
- Mary Elizabeth Barber (1818–1899), British-born botanist and painter active in South Africa
- Dorothy Barclay (1892–1940), South African botanical painter
- Winsome Fanny Barker (1907–1994), South African botanist and plant collector; illustrated Flowering Plants of South Africa
- Anne Maria Barkly (c. 1838–1932), British botanist
- Anne Henslow Barnard (died 1899), botanical illustrator
- Eileen Barnes (1876–1956), Irish botanical artist
- Moyra Barry (1886–1960), Irish artist
- Rose Barton (1856–1929), Anglo-Irish artist and watercolourist
- Gertrud Bartusch (died 1917), German botanical illustrator
- Françoise Basseporte (1701–1780), French painter, Royal Painter for the King's Garden and Cabinet
- Auriol Batten (1918–2015), South African botanical illustrator
- Mary Battersby (fl. 1801–1841), Irish artist and naturalist
- Ruth Ellen Berkeley (1845–1914), English mycologist, collector of fungi specimens and scientific botanical illustrator
- Elizabeth Blackwell (1699 –1758), botanical illustrator and engraver, made medical reference work A Curious Herbal which was "among the earliest publications on botany by a woman"
- Edith Blake (1846–1926), Irish botanical illustrator and writer
- Marjorie Blamey (1918–2019), English painter and illustrator, founding member of the charity Plantlife
- Susannah Blaxill (born 1954), Australian botanical illustrator and watercolourist
- Agnes Block (1629–1704), Dutch art collector and horticulturalist
- Fanny Blood (1758–1785), English illustrator and educator
- Hertha Bokelmann (1915-2005), South African botanist and botanical illustrator
- Sheila Bownas (1925–2007) British textile designer and botanical illustrator
- Winifred Boys-Smith (1865–1939), English science artist, professor, and school principal
- Olivia Marie Braida-Chiusano (born 1948), American botanical artist, author, and educator
- Winifred M. A. Brooke (1893–1975), British botanist, illustrator and author; the plant genera Misbrookea and Cleistocactus brookeae were named in her honour
- Rhona Brown (1922-2014), South African botanical artist
- Margaret Warriner Buck (1857-1929), American botanical artist, specialized in depicting California wildflowers
- Priscilla Susan Bury (1799–1872), English botanist and illustrator
- Mildred Anne Butler (1858–1941), Irish artist who specialized in watercolour and oil painting
- Emilie von Büttner (1804–1867), German flower and botanical painter

== C ==
- Beatrice Orchard Carter
- Elisa-Honorine Champin
- Mary Agnes Chase
- Maureen Elizabeth Church
- Edith Clements
- Lise Cloquet (1788–1860), French botanical painter
- Elizabeth Conabere
- Gillian Condy
- Mary Elizabeth Connell
- Catherine Teresa Cookson
- Frances Crawshaw
- Shirley Gale Cross
- Clare Cryan
- Lady Charlotte Wheeler Cuffe
- Fanny Currey

== D ==
- Mary Delany
- Louise-Cécile Descamps-Sabouret (born 3 October 1855), French painter and botanical artist
- Margaret Rebecca Dickinson (1821–1918) botanical artist who lived in north-east England and the Scottish Borders
- Barbara Regina Dietzsch
- Ethel May Dixie
- Catharina Helena Dörrien
- Bessie Downes
- Doris Downes
- Sarah Drake
- Hélène Durand

== E ==
- Audrey Eagle
- Mary Emily Eaton
- Frances Anne Edgeworth
- Thérèse Ekblom
- Diana Conyngham Ellis
- Rica Erickson (1908–2009) Australian naturalist, historian, author and teacher; the orchid genus Ericksonella was named in her honour
- Elsie Elizabeth Esterhuysen (1912–2006) South African botanist; collected over 36,000 herbarium specimens of South African flora
- Ella Howard Estill
- Nathalie Elma d'Esménard
- Barbara Everard

== F ==
- Marianne Fannin
- Madeleine Charlotte Fawkes
- Sarah Featon (1848–1927), New Zealand botanical artist; illustrated The Art Album of New Zealand Flora, the first full-colour art book to be printed in New Zealand
- Susan Fereday
- Minna Fernald
- Mary Fielding
- Louisa Finch, Countess of Aylesford
- Ellen Thayer Fisher
- Agnes Dunbar Moodie Fitzgibbon
- Rosa Fiveash
- Margaret Flockton
- Margaret Forrest
- Cherryl Fountain
- Kathleen Fox
- Millicent Franks (1886–1961), South African botanical illustrator
- Ingeborg Frederiksen (1886–1976), Danish painter and illustrator
- Elsie Herbold Froeschner (1913–2006), American scientific illustrator
- Magdalena Fürstin
- Faith Fyles

== G ==
- Catherine Gage
- Giovanna Garzoni
- Adelia Sarah Gates
- Marguerite Primrose Gerrard
- Elizabeth Gray
- Harriet Greenwood (1869-1948) New Zealand botanical illustrator
- Mary Grierson
- Maria Gugelberg von Moos
- Louise Guthrie (1879–1966) South African botanist and botanical artist, known for her depictions of South African protea species

== H ==
- Lucretia Breazeale Hamilton
- Charlotte Hardcastle
- Lucy Hardcastle (circa 1771–1834), British botanist and teacher; ran a school in Derby from the late 1700s until the 1830s
- Florence May Harding
- Emily Harris
- Gertrude Hartland
- Sarah Elizabeth Hay-Williams
- Esmé Frances Hennessy
- Johanna Helena Herolt
- Sabine Helms (1866-1929) Danish amateur botanist
- Georgina Hetley
- Helen Joan Hewson (1938–2007), Australian botanist and botanical illustrator
- Helen Burns Higgs (1897–1983), Bahamian writer, journalist and botanical illustrator; specialized in research on Bahamian herbal medicine and cuisine
- Orra White Hitchcock
- Sarah Hoare (1777–1856), British writer and artist known for her scientific poetry
- Rosemary Charlotte Holcroft
- Maria Elizabeth Holland
- Berthe Hoola van Nooten
- Annie E. Hoyle
- Regina Olson Hughes
- Ellen Hutchins
- Alice Clary Earle Hyde

== I ==
- Hannah Cassels im Thurn

== J ==
- Alice Jacob
- Eveline Annie Jenkins
- Barbara Jeppe
- Catharine Johnston (1794–1871) English botanical illustrator
- Nina Jones

== K ==
- Mary Maytham Kidd
- Pauline Kies
- Martha King
- Elizabeth and Mary Kirby
- Henriëtte Geertruida Knip

== L ==
- Deborah Lambkin
- Grania Langrishe (born 1934), Irish botanical artist
- Kathleen Annie Lansdell
- Frieda Lauth
- Mary Lawrance
- Ann Lee
- Sara Plummer Lemmon
- Cythna Letty
- Blythe Loutit
- Lena Lowis

== M ==
- Kathleen Marescaux
- Bessie Niemeyer Marshall
- Harriet Mason (1845–1932) English and South African song collector, botanical illustrator, plant collector, poor-law inspector, and author
- Kathleen McArthur
- Mary McMurtrie
- Margaret Mee
- Mary Mendum
- Louisa Anne Meredith
- Maria Sibylla Merian
- Maria Morris Miller
- Margaret Olive Milne-Redhead (1904–1997), also known as Olive Shaw or Margaret Olive Shaw; English artist and botanical illustrator
- Maria Moninckx
- Harriet Morgan
- Henrietta Maria Moriarty

== N ==
- Amanda Newton
- Philippa Nikulinsky
- Marianne North
- Carol Nourse

== O ==
- Helen Sophia O'Hara

== P ==
- Mary Maud Page
- Olive Coates Palgrave
- Marietta Pallis
- Ernestine Panckoucke
- Louise von Panhuys
- Deborah Griscom Passmore
- Jean Paton (born 1929) British botanist,bryologist, and botanical illustrator
- Susan J. Patrick (born 1944) Australian botanist, taxonomist, illustrator, and ecologist
- Helena Christina van de Pavord Smits
- Ethel Anson Peckham (1879–1965) American horticulturist and botanical artist; founding member of the American Iris Society
- Olivia Peguero
- Emily Pelloe
- Margaret Pieroni
- Barbara Pike
- Olive Pink
- Frederica Plunket
- Katherine Plunket
- Elsa Pooley
- Clara Pope
- Caroline Pounds
- Anne Pratt
- Della Purves (1945–2008) British botanical artist

== Q ==
- Rosane Quintella (1959–2020) Brazilian botanical artist and teacher

== R ==
- Christie Repasy
- Sarah Rhodes
- Elsie Garrett Rice
- Ellen Robbins
- Emma Roberts
- Nellie Roberts
- Mary Lou Romney (1929–2003), American painter
- Margaret Roscoe
- Stella Ross-Craig
- Celia Rosser
- Arabella Elizabeth Roupell
- Ellis Rowan
- Anne Rudge

== S ==
- Cora Helena Sarle
- Marion Satterlee
- Elisabeth Hallowell Saunders
- Katharine Saunders
- Vera Scarth-Johnson
- Ellen Isham Schutt
- Helena Scott
- Susan Sex
- Lydia Shackleton
- Elsie Louise Shaw
- Jessica Rosemary Shepherd
- Sarah Simblet (born 1972) graphic artist, writer and broadcaster
- Isabella McHutcheson Sinclair
- Susie Barstow Skelding
- Dorothea Eliza Smith
- Ethelynde Smith
- Matilda Smith
- Lilian Snelling
- Holly Somerville
- Charlotte Caroline Sowerby
- Frances Stackhouse Acton
- Emily Stackhouse
- Mary Anne Stebbing
- Olga Stewart (1920–1998) Scottish botanist and botanical artist
- Margaret Stoddart
- Margaret Stones
- Edith Frances Mary Struben
- Carrie Sweetser

== T ==
- Cynthia Tait
- Alice Tangerini
- Anna Heyward Taylor
- Elizabeth Taylor
- Emma Homan Thayer
- Harriet Anne Thiselton-Dyer
- Estelle Thomson
- Elisa Marie Thornam
- Emily Jane Thwaits
- Anne Marie Trechslin
- Charlotte Georgina Trower
- Anna Maria Truter
- Elizabeth Twining

== V ==
- Anna Maria Vaiani
- Elinor Frances Vallentin
- Vesque Sisters
- Henriette Vincent

== W ==
- Mary Vaux Walcott
- Ada Hill Walker
- Anna Frances Walker
- Anna Maria Walker
- Winifred Walker (1882-1965) British artist and botanical illustrator
- Wendy F. Walsh
- Ellaphie Ward-Hilhorst
- Charlotte, Lady Wheeler-Cuffe
- Inez Harrington Whitfield (1867–1951) American educator and botanical illustrator; known for watercolor paintings of wildflowers native to Arkansas
- Emily Whymper
- Caroline Catharine Wilkinson (1822–1881) Welsh botanist; authored Weeds And Wild Flowers: Their Uses, Legends, And Literature
- Augusta Innes Withers
- Alida Withoos
- Anne Kingsbury Wollstonecraft
- Helen Adelaide Wood (1860–1927) British botanical artist and scientific illustrator; one of the first women museum workers in the Caribbean
- Florence Woolward (1854–1936) English botanical illustrator and author
- Winifred Grace Wright (1891–1978) English chemist; illustrated a pocket guide on the flowers of the Province of Natal
