= Mary Page =

Mary Page may refer to:

- Mary Boomer Page (died 1927), American educator
- Mary L. Page (1849–1921), American architect
- Mary Maud Page (1867–1925), English-South African botanical illustrator
- Mary Hutcheson Page (1860–1940), American suffragist

== See also ==
- The Strange Case of Mary Page, a 1916 American lost film
