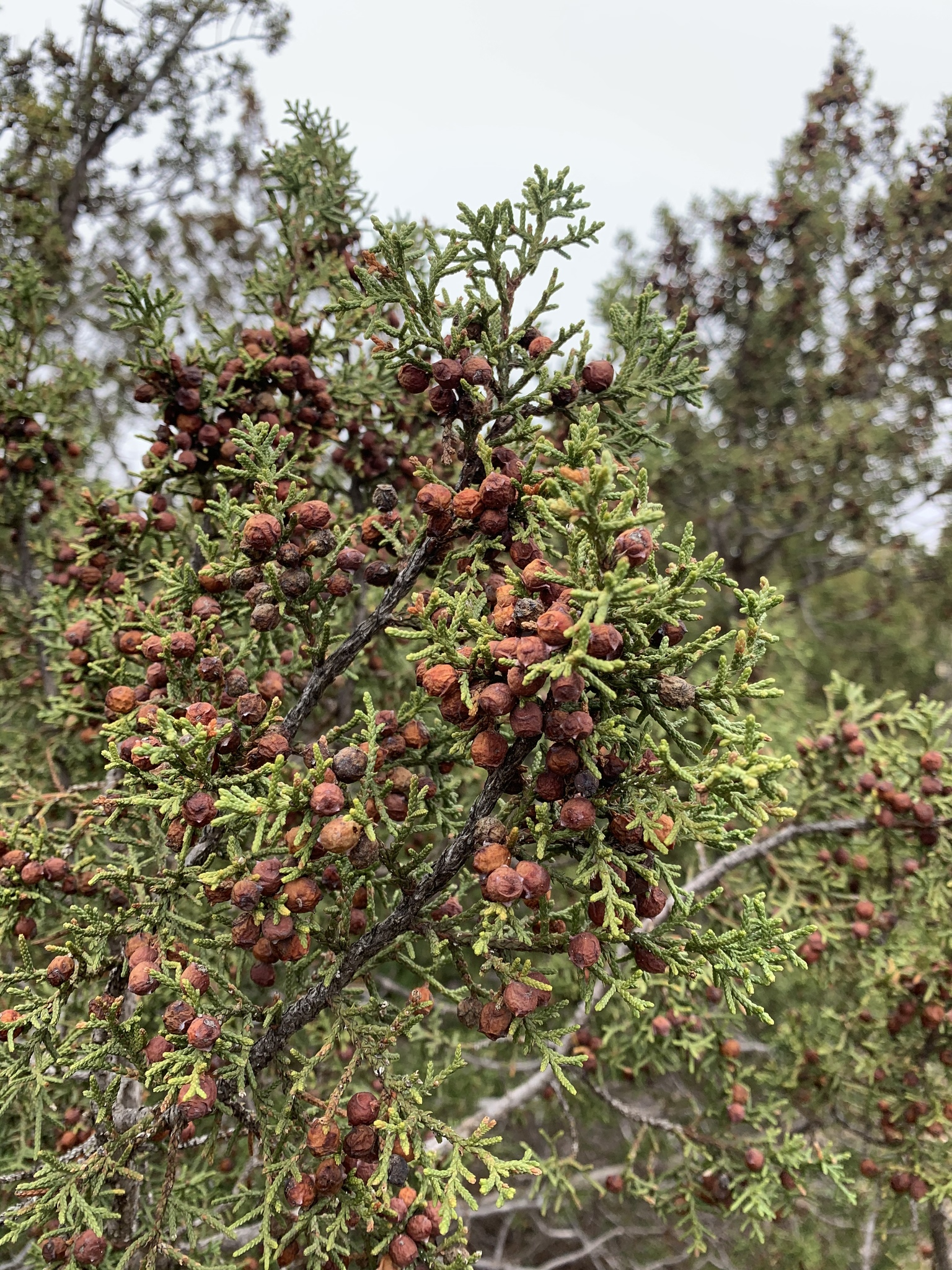

Conservation status
- Least Concern (IUCN 3.1)

Scientific classification
- Kingdom: Plantae
- Clade: Tracheophytes
- Clade: Gymnospermae
- Division: Pinophyta
- Class: Pinopsida
- Order: Cupressales
- Family: Cupressaceae
- Genus: Juniperus
- Species: J. pinchotii

Binomial name
- Juniperus pinchotii Sudw.
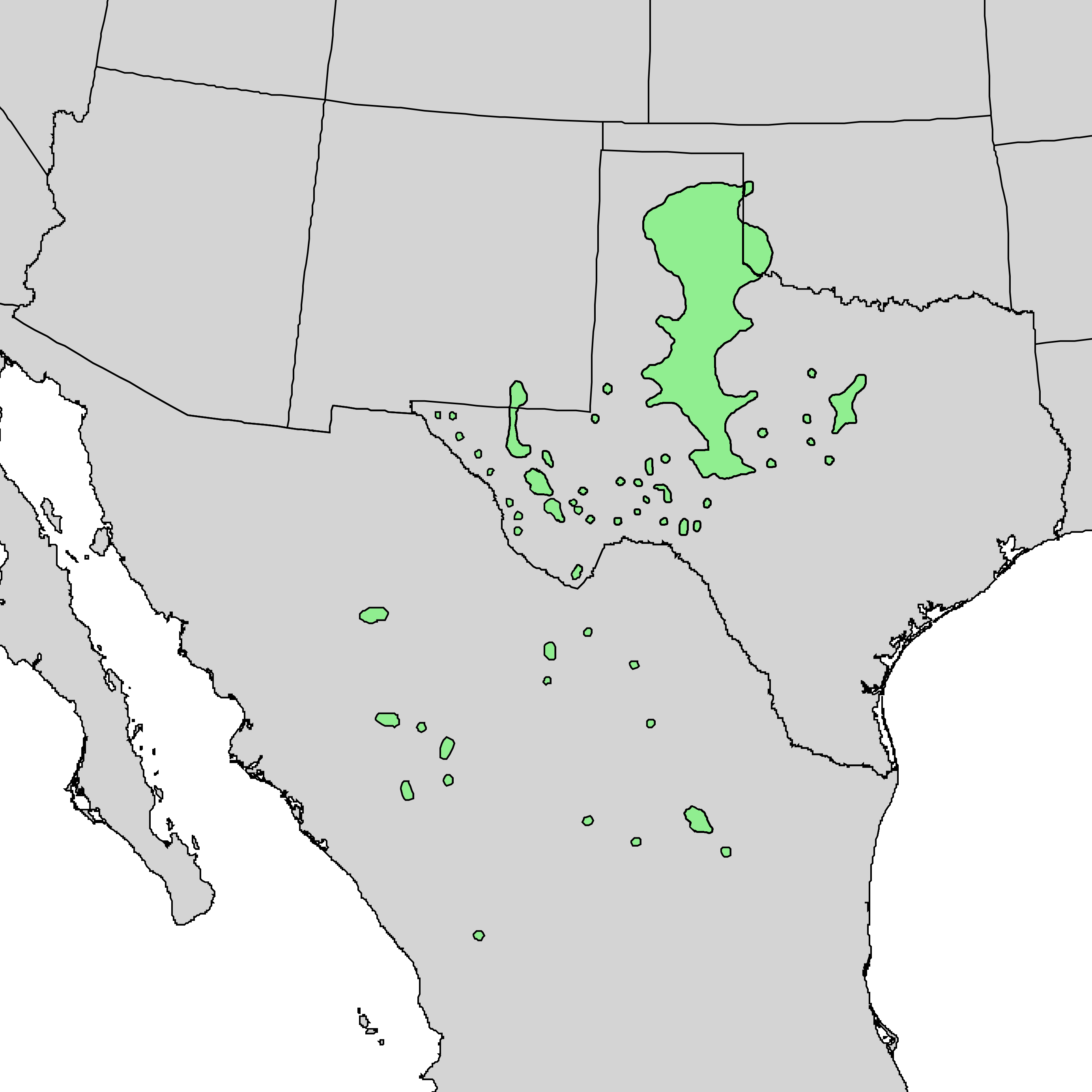
- Natural range

Synonyms
- Juniperus erythrocarpa Cory; Juniperus texensis van Melle

= Juniperus pinchotii =

Species of conifer

Juniperus pinchotii, commonly known as Pinchot juniper or redberry juniper, is a species of juniper native to south-western North America, in Mexico: Nuevo León and Coahuila, and in the United States: south-eastern New Mexico, central Texas, and western Oklahoma.

It grows at altitudes between 600 and 2,100 metres (2,000 and 6,900 feet).

== Description ==
Juniperus pinchotii is an evergreen coniferous shrub or small tree growing to 1–6 metres (3 1/2–19 1/2 feet) tall, usually multistemmed, and with a dense, rounded crown. The bark is pale gray, exfoliating in thin longitudinal strips, exposing orange brown underneath. The ultimate shoots are 1.1–1.8 millimetres thick. The leaves are scale-like, 1–2 mm long and 0.5–1.5 mm broad on small shoots, up to 12 mm long on vigorous shoots; they are arranged in alternating whorls of three or opposite pairs. The juvenile leaves, produced on young seedlings only, are needle-like.

The cones are berry-like, with soft resinous flesh, subglobose to ovoid, 5–8 mm (rarely 10 mm) long, orange-red, often with a pale pink waxy bloom, and contain one or two seeds; they are mature in about 12 months from pollination. The male cones are 3–4 mm long, and shed their pollen in fall. It is usually dioecious, with male and female cones on separate plants, but occasional monoecious plants can be found.

=== Hybrids ===
Hybrids with Juniperus coahuilensis are known. They have also occasionally been reported with Juniperus monosperma, but never verified; all claimed hybrids tested have proven not to be. These two are unable to hybridize in nature, being isolated by pollination time (autumn for J. pinchotii, late winter for J. monosperma).
