= Bokelmann =

Bokelmann is a surname and may refer to:

- Christian Ludwig Bokelmann (1844–1894), German genre painter in the Realistic and Naturalistic styles
- Dick Bokelmann (1926–2019), American Major League Baseball pitcher
- Hertha Bokelmann (née Faekle) (1915–2005), Spanish-born South African botanist and botanical illustrator
