= Bartusch =

Bartusch is a German language surname. It stems from a reduced form of the male given name Bartholomew – and may refer to:

- Gertrud Bartusch (died 1917), German botanical illustrator
- Günter Bartusch (1943–1971), Grand Prix motorcycle road racer from the former East Germany
