= Frances Theodora Parsons =

American botanist

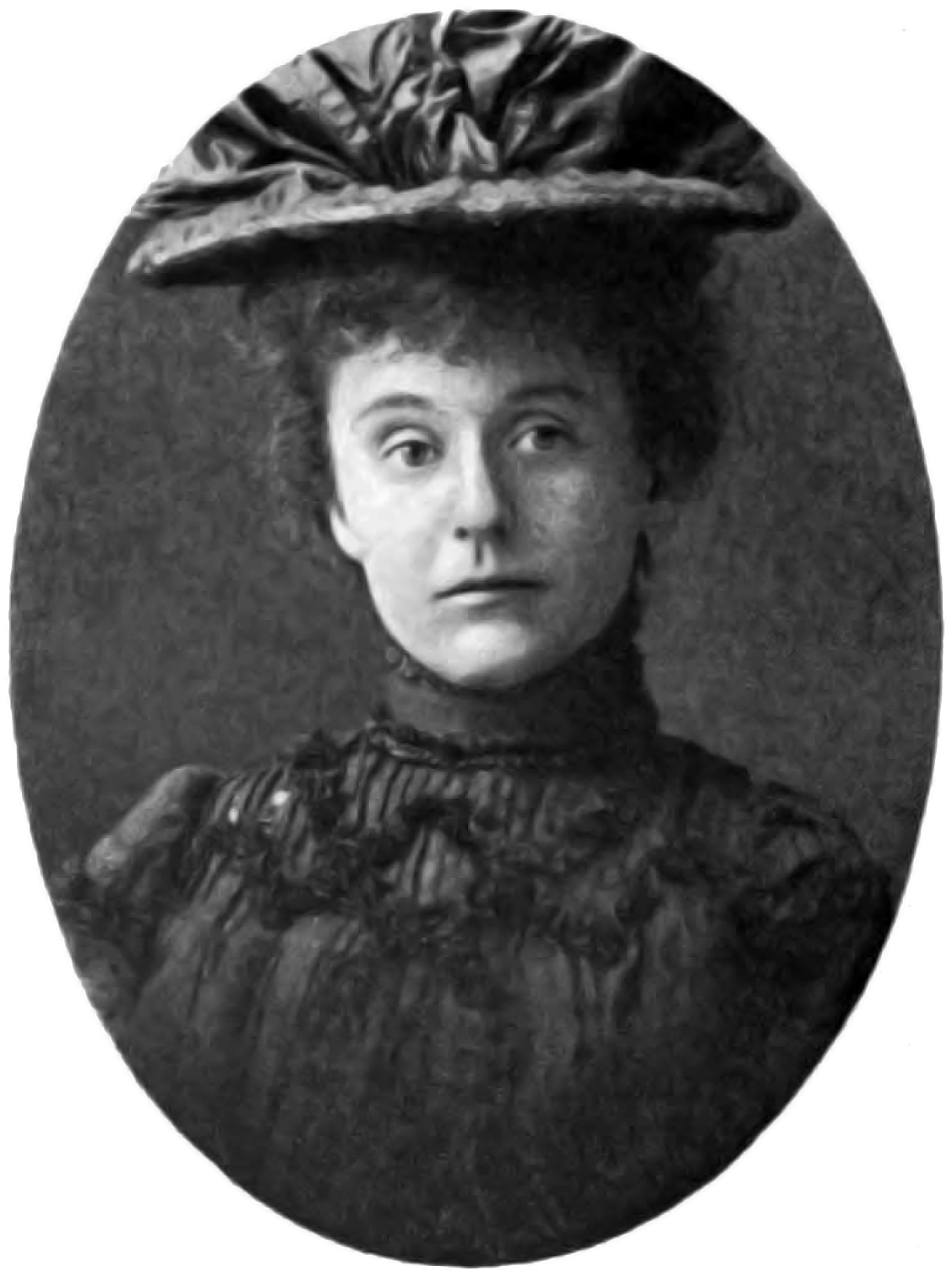
- Born: Frances Theodora Smith; December 5, 1861; New York
- Died: June 10, 1952 (aged 90); Katonah, New York
- Known for: wildflower guidebooks
- Spouse(s): William Starr Dana (m. 1884; died 1890) James Russell Parsons (m. 1896; died 1905)
- Scientific career
- Fields: Botany
- Author abbrev. (botany): F.Parsons

Frances Theodora Parsons (née Smith, formerly Dana; December 5, 1861 – June 10, 1952), who initially published as Mrs. William Starr Dana, was an American naturalist and author active in the United States during the late 19th and early 20th centuries. She wrote a number of books, including a popular guide to American wildflowers.

== Early life and education ==
Frances Theodora Smith was born in New York in 1861 to Denton Smith, a tea merchant, and Harriet (née Shelton) Smith. She had a sister, Alice Josephine (1859–1909), who became an artist and later illustrated two of her books. She was educated privately at Miss Comstock’s School. She is said to have gained her love of botany during summers spent with her grandparents in rural New York state.

Her first husband, William Starr Dana, whom she married in 1884, was a naval officer. He died in an 1890 flu epidemic, and six years later she married James Russell Parsons, an educator and administrator in the state of New York and later a diplomat. They had a son, Russell and a daughter, Dorothea, who died as a toddler. James himself died in 1905 in an automobile accident in Mexico City.

Following James's death, Parsons moved to New York City, where she was an active supporter of the Republican Party as well as the Progressive Party. She served in various official capacities on party committees, and she managed Fiorello H. La Guardia's successful campaign to become president of New York's Board of Aldermen. She was also an advocate of women's suffrage.

== Career ==
Following the loss of her first husband, Parsons' sought solace in long walks with her friend the illustrator Marion Satterlee. These outings prompted her first and most important botanical work, How to Know the Wild Flowers (1893), which was the first field guide to North American wildflowers. The book was quite successful, with the first printing selling out in five days. How to Know the Wild Flowers garnered favorable responses from Theodore Roosevelt and Rudyard Kipling, among others. The work went through several editions in Parsons's lifetime and has remained in print into the 21st century. It was organized by flower colors and illustrated with 48 full-page color plates by Elsie Louise Shaw (missing from later editions) and 110 full-page black-and-white illustrations by Satterlee.

Parsons' second book, According to Season (1894), was a compendium of nature writing that she had previously published in The New York Tribune.

Her third book, Plants and Their Children (1896), was intended for children and was listed as one of the 50 best children’s books of its day.

In 1899, Parsons published How to Know the Ferns, a companion to her first guidebook. The writing of this book was largely prompted by her husband's financial difficulties.

After her fourth book, Parsons stopped writing for several decades. In 1952, at the age of 90, she published a memoir, Perchance Some Day.

== Books ==
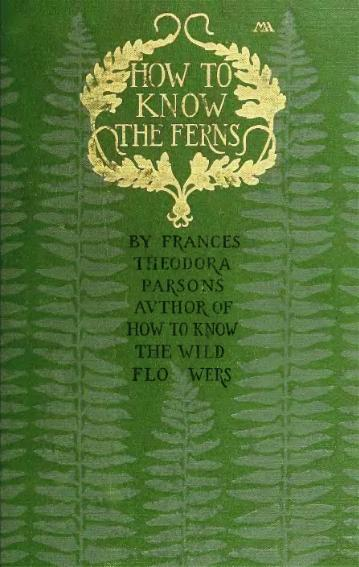
Cover of How to Know the Ferns (7th ed)

Parsons's books, with the notable exception of her autobiography, are widely available on the Internet and in library special collections. The below links are from the Biodiversity Heritage Library and Wikisource.

=== Writing as Mrs. William Starr Dana ===
- How to Know the Wildflowers (1893). New York: Charles Scribner's Son's.
  - Second edition (1893) Illustrations by Marion Satterlee.
  - "New Edition" (1923) Expanded with illustrations by Marion Satterlee and additional color illustrations by Elsie Louise Shaw.
- According to Season (1894). New York: Charles Scribner's Sons. Illustrated by Elsie Louise Shaw.
- Plants and Their Children (1896). New York: American Book Company. Illustrations by Alice Josephine Smith.

=== Writing as Frances Theodora Parsons ===
- How to Know the Ferns (1899). Illustrated by Marion Satterlee and Alice Josephine Smith. The first printing by Toronto: The Publisher's Syndicate Limited; at least seven more printings, 1899-1925 by New York: Charles Scribner's Son's; at least two printings by New York: Dover Books; and one printing, 2005, by Kessinger Publishing.
- Perchance Some Day (1951). Autobiography, privately printed.
