= Winifred M. A. Brooke =

British botanist, artist and author

- Born: 16 February 1893; Stroud Green, London, England
- Died: 4 November 1975 (aged 82); Alton, Hampshire, England
- Scientific career
- Fields: Botany

Winifred Mary Adelaide Brooke (16 February 1893 – 4 November 1975) was a British botanist, illustrator and author who made scientifically significant collections of botanical specimens, including in the Bolivian Andes. The plant genus Misbrookea was named in her honour by Vicki Funk.

== Early life ==
Brooke was born on 16 February 1893 in Stroud Green, London, England. She was the daughter of Margaret Ling Brooke (née Livermore) and Rev. Charles William Alfred Brooke. During her childhood she spend time in Switzerland and co-authored a travel book with her mother on the subject.

Brooke was the President of the Alton Natural History Society, was elected as a member of the British Entomological and Natural History Society in 1930, and was elected to the Linnean Society of London on 24 May 1946.

== Plant collecting ==
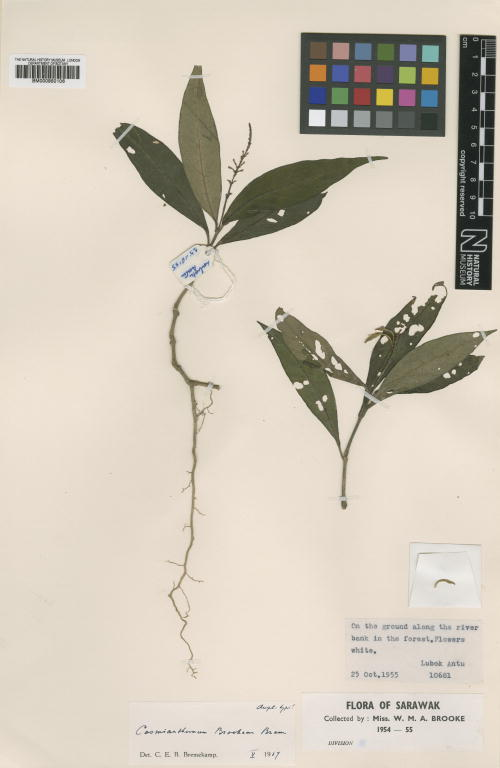
Cosmianthemum brookeae collected by Winifred Brooke in Sarawak

In 1936, Brooke travelled to the Canary Islands where she collected botanical specimens now held in the Natural History Museum, London, the New York Botanical Garden and the Field Museum. She also travelled to Lesotho collecting and making water colour sketches of plants from 1937 to 1938. While there, she made scientifically important botany collections that are held at the Natural History Museum, London. In 1948 Brooke undertook a journey to South America on the encouragement of Dr. John Ramsbottom, of the British Museum Natural History. She travelled first to Bolivia, arriving in December 1948, staying there until November 1949. Brooke herself acknowledged the assistance of Professor Martín Cárdenas during this time. She then travelled on to Chile. While in South America she established a collection of over 2000 herbarium specimens and described numerous species new to science. Brooke also travelled to Sarawak, again collecting specimens and describing species new to science. Some of the specimens she collected in Sarawak were subsequently sold to the Smithsonian Institution.

== Death ==
She died in Alton, Hampshire on 4 November 1975. The Royal Geographical Society holds Brooke's notes on Switzerland and her guidebooks. The Natural History Museum, London hold her field notes, determination lists, and seed lists.

== Eponyms ==
The genus and some of the species named in honour of Brooke are:

- Misbrookea
- Stephanophysum brookeae, now regarded as a synonym of Ruellia longipedunculata.
- Cleistocactus brookeae
- Cosmianthemum brookeae
- Filetia brookeae
- Phyllagathis brookei

== Publications ==
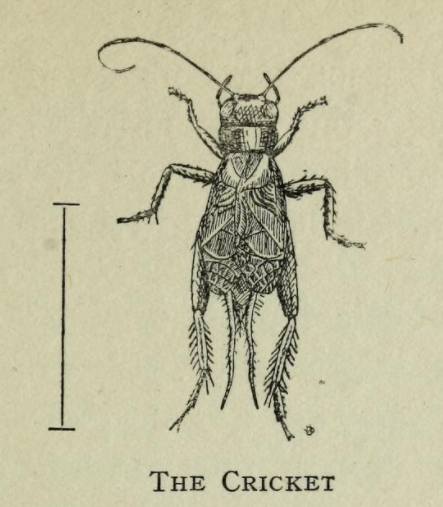
The Cricket by Winifred M. A. Brooke

As Author:

- Winter life in Switzerland : its sports and health resorts by Margaret L Brooke, Winifred M A Brooke and Adolf Eichenberger. London : Isaac Pitman & Sons, 1913.
- Some Observations on the Life History of Arthrocnodak wissmani Kieffer (Cecidomyidae: Diptera). Entomologist 64 (1931): 1–3.
- Sketches from Nature in the North of Ireland. R. Carswell & Son: Belfast, 1935.
- Some Bolivian plants Proceedings and transactions of the South London Entomological & Natural History Society. 1950–1953: 137–143
- Contributions on Trepanning or Trephination in Ancient and Modern Times by Kenneth Page Oakley, W. M. A. Brooke, A. R. Akester, and D. R. Brothwell. Royal Anthropological Institute of Great Britain and Ireland, 1959.

As Illustrator:

- Lace in the making : with bobbins and needle by Margaret L. Brooke.
- Insect life, its why and wherefore. by Hubert George Stanley.
