= George Bishop Sudworth =

American botanist (1864–1927)

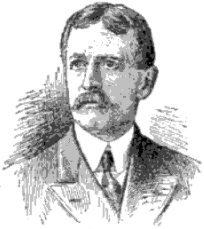
- Born: August 31, 1864; Kingston, Wisconsin
- Died: May 10, 1927 (aged 62); Washington D.C.
- Education: University of Michigan
- Occupation: Botanist
- Spouse: Frances Gertrude Kingsbury (m. 1897)

George Bishop Sudworth (August 31, 1864 – May 10, 1927) was an American botanist. At the time of his death, he was the Chief Dendrologist of the United States Forest Service.

== Biography ==
Born in Kingston, Wisconsin, Sudworth graduated from the University of Michigan in 1885. In 1885-1886 he was an instructor in botany at Michigan State Agricultural College and entered the Forestry Division of the U. S. Department of Agriculture in 1886. During his life, Sudworth published several books, but his most famous is A Check List of the Forest Trees of the United States. Other works include "The Pine Trees of the Rocky Mountain Region" which was illustrated by Annie E. Hoyle.

Sudworth discovered many new species and varieties of North American trees.

Sudworth was a founder of the Society of American Foresters, and was also a member of the Washington Academy of Sciences, the Biological and Botanical Societies of Washington, and an honorary member of the Finnish forestry association, Finska Forstsamfundet.

He married Frances Gertrude Kingsbury on February 24, 1897, and they had one son.

He died at his home in Washington D.C., on May 10, 1927.
