= Olga Stewart =

Scottish botanist and botanical artist

Olga Margaret Stewart née Mounsey (1 July 1920 – 6 August 1998) was a prolific Scottish botanist and botanical artist.

== Biography ==
=== Early life ===
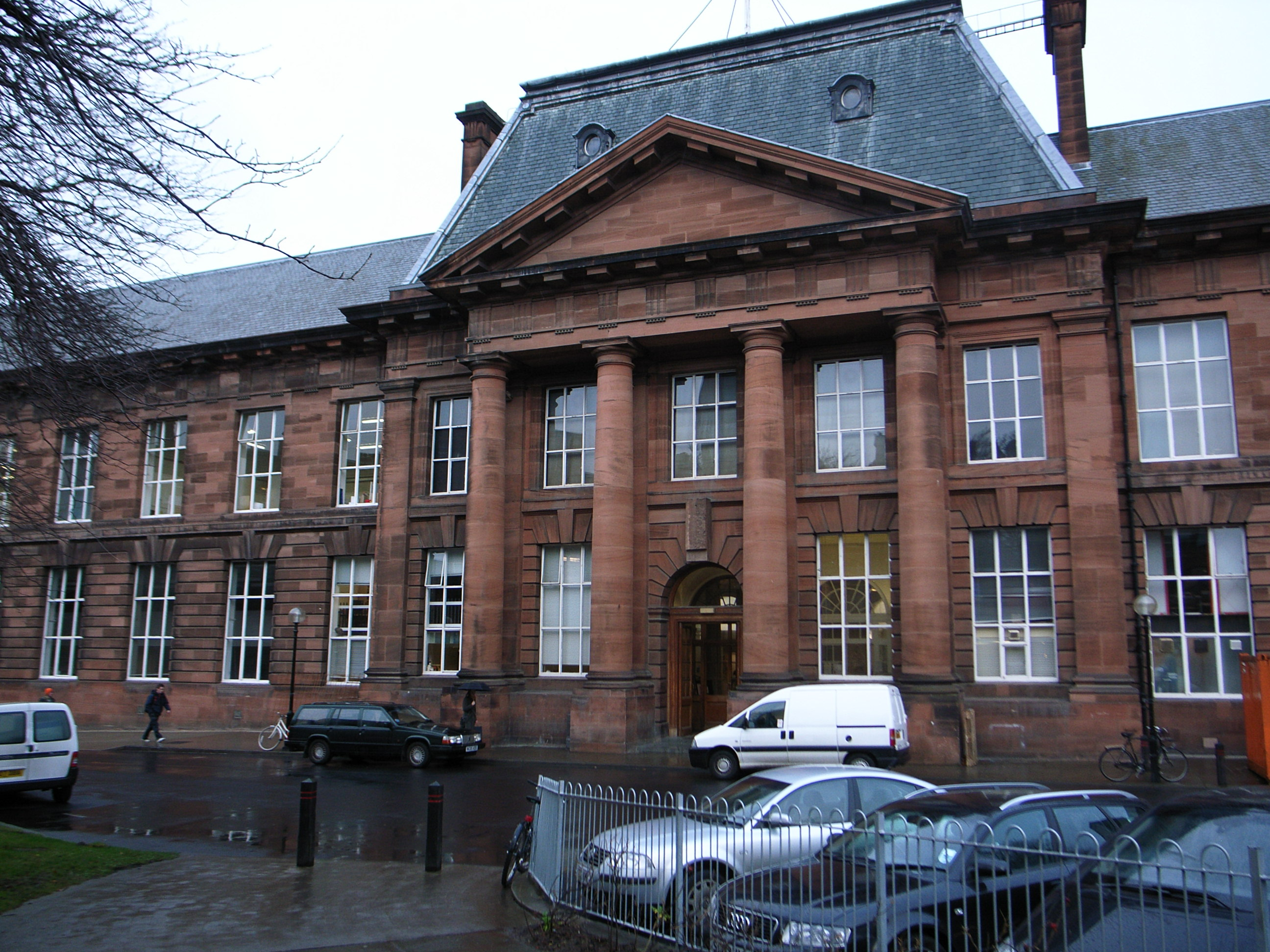
The Edinburgh College of Art

Olga Margaret Mounsey was born in Edinburgh to Marjory Brookfield and James Mounsey, a lawyer. She went to schools in Edinburgh and Kent before studying at the Edinburgh College of Art between 1938 and 1939.

=== World War II ===
Between 1939 and 1940 Stewart studied engineering for a year at Dalhousie University, Nova Scotia. She then went on to work as a draughtswoman at Halifax naval dockyard for the National Research Council of Canada between 1940 and 1943. For the remainder of the war she worked for the Royal Navy in Edinburgh, Scotland.

=== Post-war & work as botanist ===
On 28 November 1946, she married Frank Stewart, a lawyer who later served as Scottish consul for the Principality of Monaco. In 1947, she began drawing flowers in 1947 and joined the Wildflower Society. Stewart joined the Botanical Society of Britain and Ireland (BSBI) in 1967. She quickly became an expert field botanist and in 1975 was appointed botanical recorder for Kirkcudbrightshire. Her botanical illustrations appeared in many BSBI publications, as well as in Mary McCallum Webster's Flora of Moray, Nairn and East Inverness (1978) and in Princess Grace of Monaco's My Book of Flowers (1980).

=== Personal life ===
Stewart had four children, one of whom became a professional botanist. She also enjoyed curling, and represented Scotland on a tour of western Canada in 1967, continuing to play in Edinburgh until 1996, two years before her death.

=== Death ===
Stewart died in New Abbey, Dumfries, on 6 August 1998, at the age of seventy-seven. In 2012 John Stewart published a complication of verse by her husband Frank Stewart and illustrations by Olga Stewart titled "Wild Flowers and Doggerel".

== Selected works ==
- Flowering Plants of Kirkcudbrightshire (1990)
