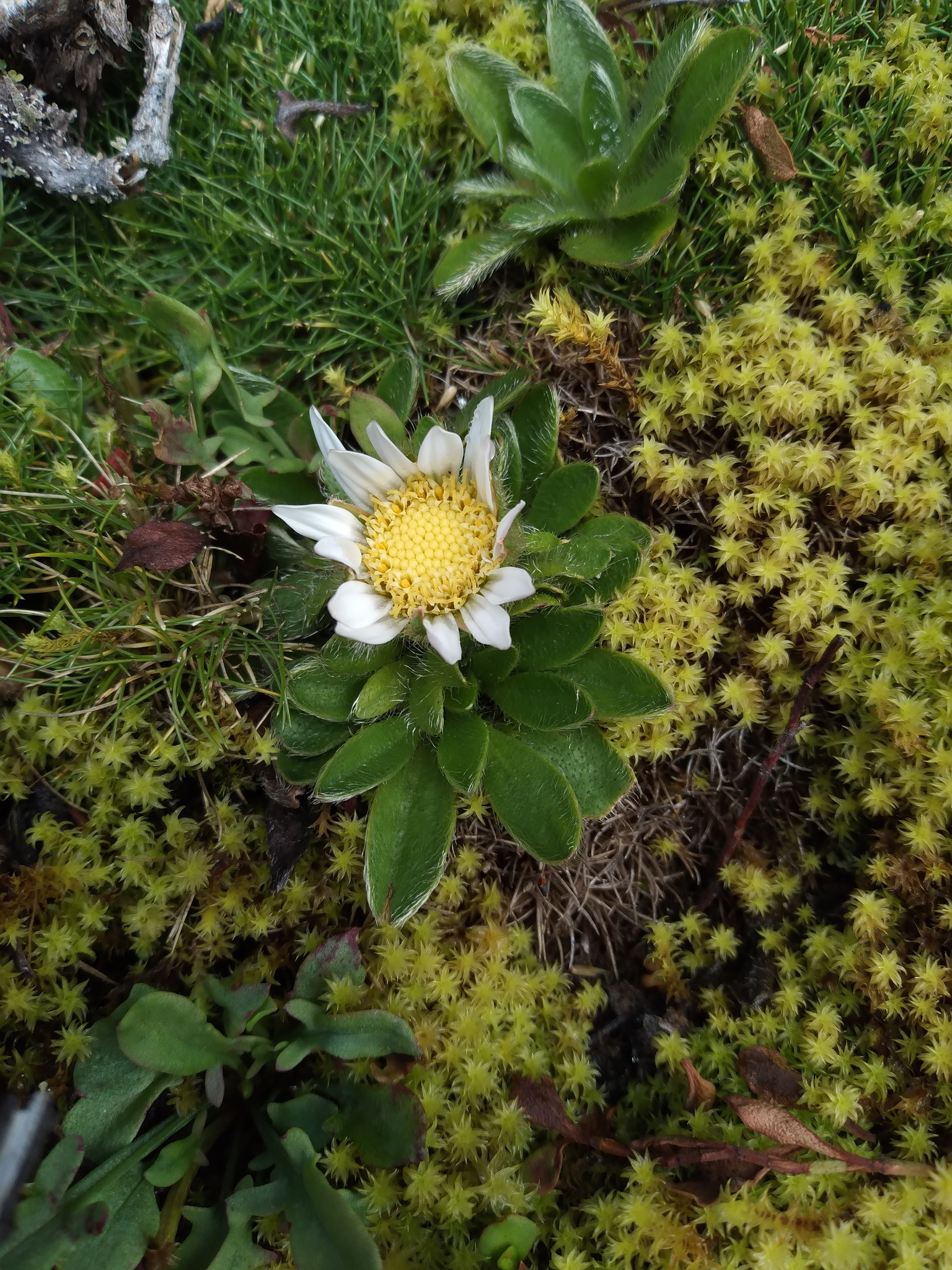
- Misbrookea strigosissima in Bolivia

Scientific classification
- Kingdom: Plantae
- Clade: Embryophytes
- Clade: Tracheophytes
- Clade: Angiosperms
- Clade: Eudicots
- Clade: Asterids
- Order: Asterales
- Family: Asteraceae
- Subfamily: Asteroideae
- Tribe: Senecioneae
- Genus: Misbrookea; V.A.Funk
- Species: M. strigosissima

Binomial name
- Misbrookea strigosissima (A.Gray) V.A.Funk

Synonyms
- Werneria strigosissima A.Gray; Werneria boraginifolia Kuntze; Werneria setosa Wedd. ex Sch.Bip.

= Misbrookea =

Genus of flowering plants

Misbrookea is a genus of South American plants in the groundsel tribe within the sunflower family. The genus is named in honour of Miss Winifred M. A. Brooke.

The only known species is Misbrookea strigosissima, native to Peru and Bolivia. It is found in dry, high-elevation areas.
