= Emilie von Büttner =

German painter

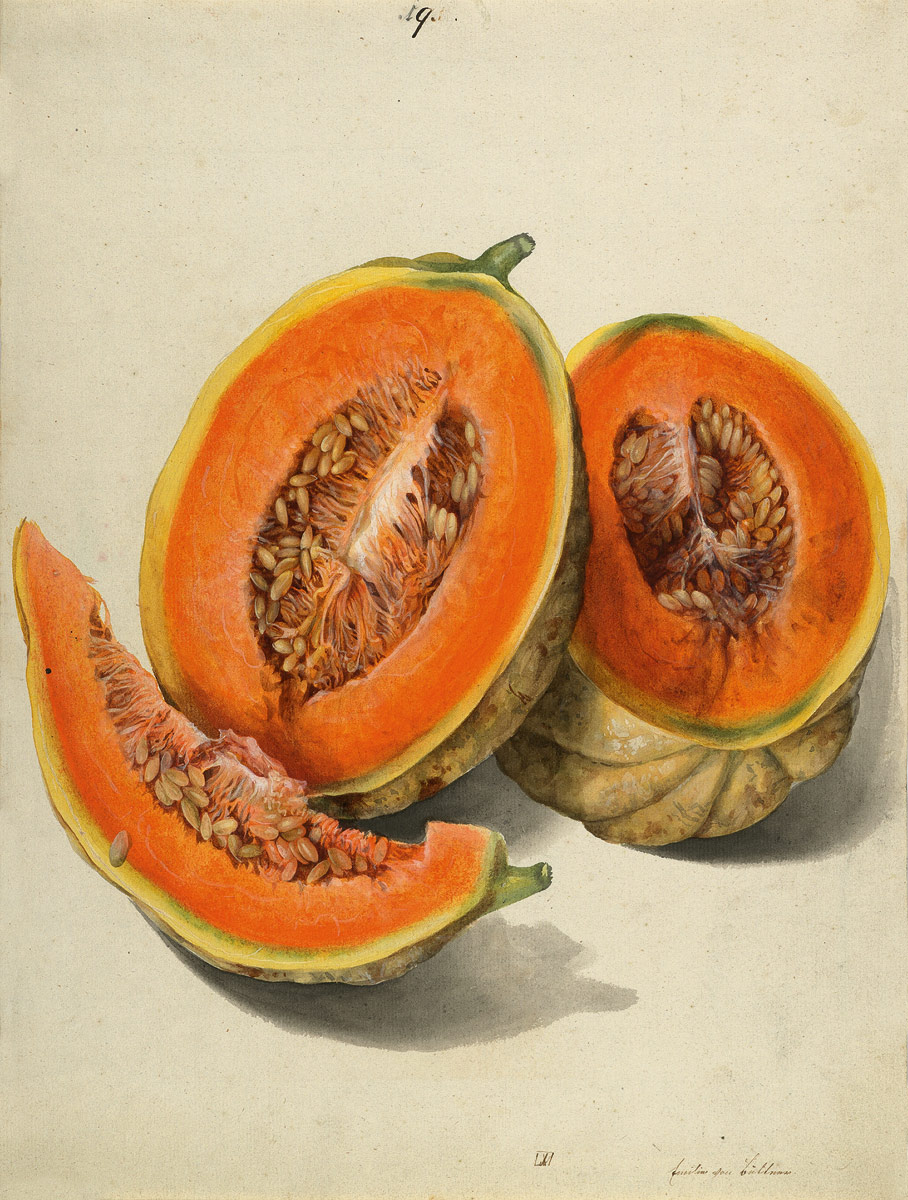

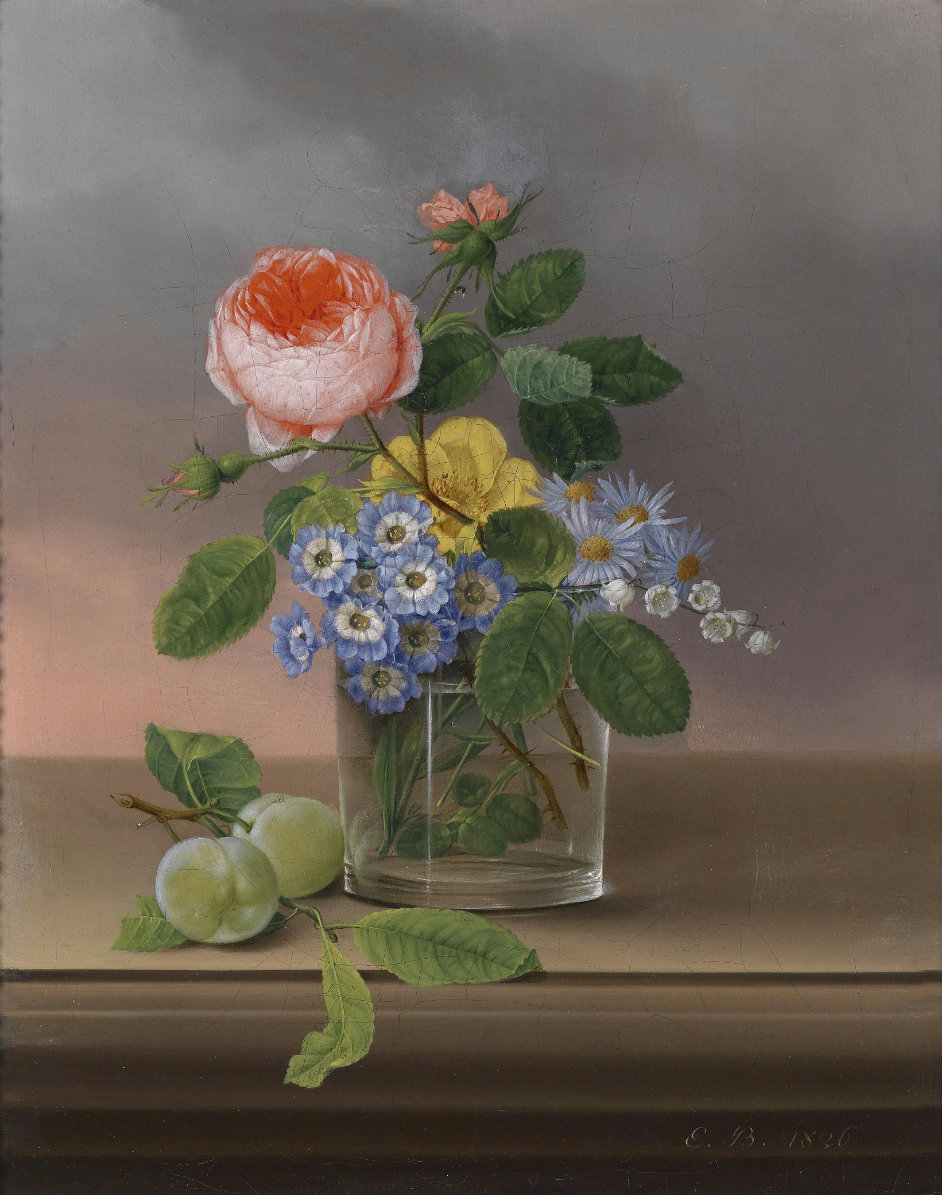

Emilie von Büttner (1804–1867) was a German flower and botanical painter.
