= Hugh and Carol Nourse =

American photographers

Hugh O. Nourse and Carol Nourse are American botanical photographers and authors. Hugh is a retired professor of economics in the Terry College of Business at the University of Georgia, where the MBA Professor of the Year Award has been renamed in his honor.

== Partial bibliography ==
=== Botanical ===
- Wildflowers of Georgia By Hugh O. Nourse, Carol Nourse; 2000 University of Georgia Press ISBN 978-0-8203-2179-0
- The State Botanical Garden of Georgia By Carol Nourse, Hugh O. Nourse; 2001 University of Georgia Press ISBN 978-0-8203-2327-5
- Favorite Wildflower Walks in Georgia By Hugh O. Nourse, Carol Nourse; 2007 University of Georgia Press ISBN 978-0-8203-2841-6
- Field guide to the rare plants of Georgia By Linda G. Chafin, Jean C. Putnam Hancock, Hugh Nourse, Carol Nourse; 2007 University of Georgia Press ISBN 978-0-9779621-0-5
- Guide to the Natural Environments of Georgia, edited by Leslie Edwards, Jonathan Ambrose, L. Katherine Kirkman, and James Renner, photographs by Hugh and Carol Nourse, expected 2012, University of Georgia Press
- Chafin, Linda G. (2016). Field Guide to the Wildflowers of Georgia and Surrounding States. Wormsloe Foundation Nature Book Ser. Hugh and Carol Nourse, Chief Photographers. Athens, GA: UGA Press. ISBN 978-0820348681.

=== Economic ===
- Regional economics; a study in the economic structure, stability, and growth of regions, Hugh O Nourse; 1968 OCLC 261608
