= Mary Fielding (botanist) =

English botanist (1804–1895)

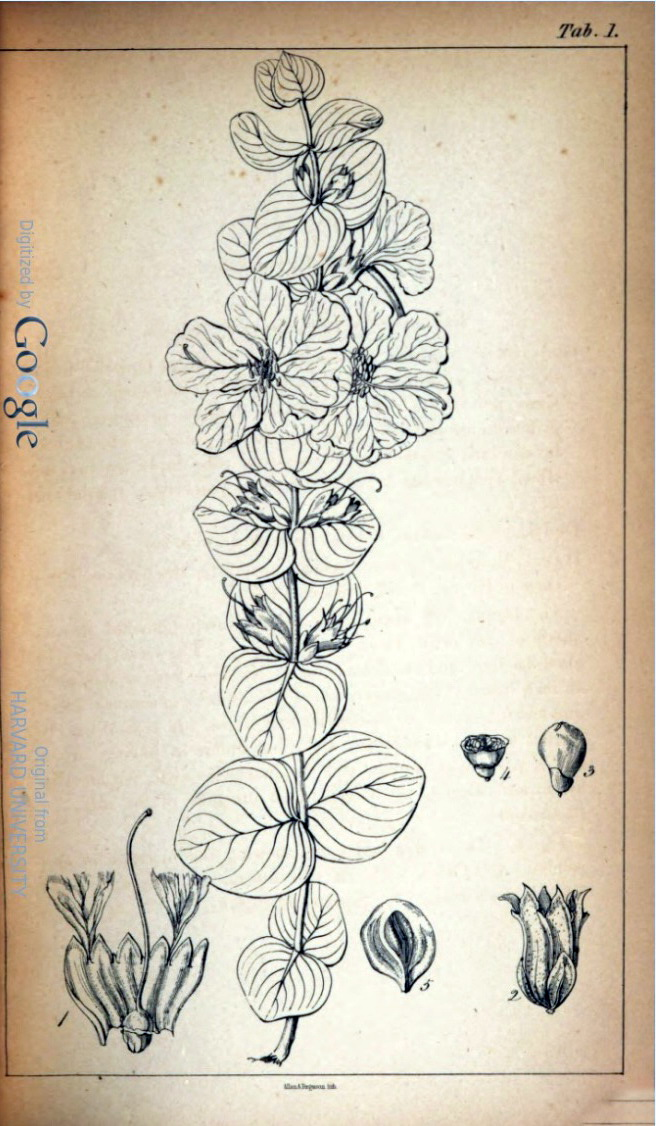
Diplusodon decussatus from 'Sertum Plantarum'

Mary Maria Fielding (née Simpson; 25 January 1804 – 22 February 1895), baptised on 22 May 1804, was a British botanist and botanical illustrator. She was the daughter of John Simpson, a merchant from Lancaster. She was the wife of fellow botanist Henry Fielding, whom she married in Liverpool on 21 December 1826. A native of Lancaster, Lancashire, between 1830 and 1833 she produced six volumes of botanical watercolours which have been cited as an "important source for the study of the county's flora in the early nineteenth century". The volumes, consisting of about 530 botanical watercolours ended up in Oxford University and in thanks the university gave her brother an M.A. In 1843, Fielding, her husband Henry, and George Gardner, published Sertum plantarum, which Mary produced illustrated descriptions for, documenting some 75 new or rare plants. She lived in Church Street, Lancaster in her last decades.
