= Marion Satterlee =

Marion Satterlee (8 January 1868 – 9 June 1965) was an American botanical artist who in 1893 illustrated the first field guide to North American wildflowers.

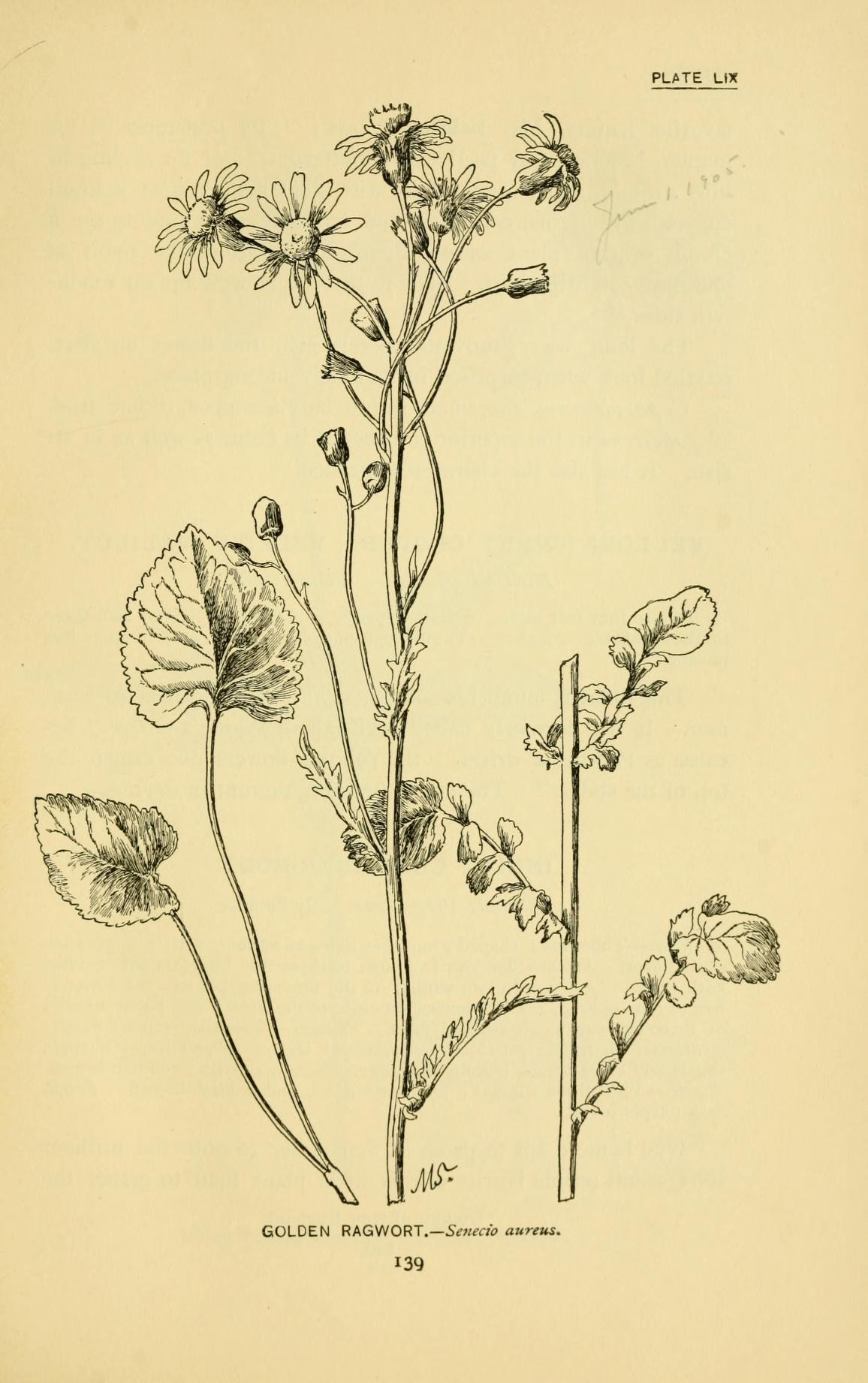
Drawing of golden ragwort (Senecio aureus) by Marion Satterlee, from How to Know the Wild Flowers by Frances Theodora Parsons, 1893.

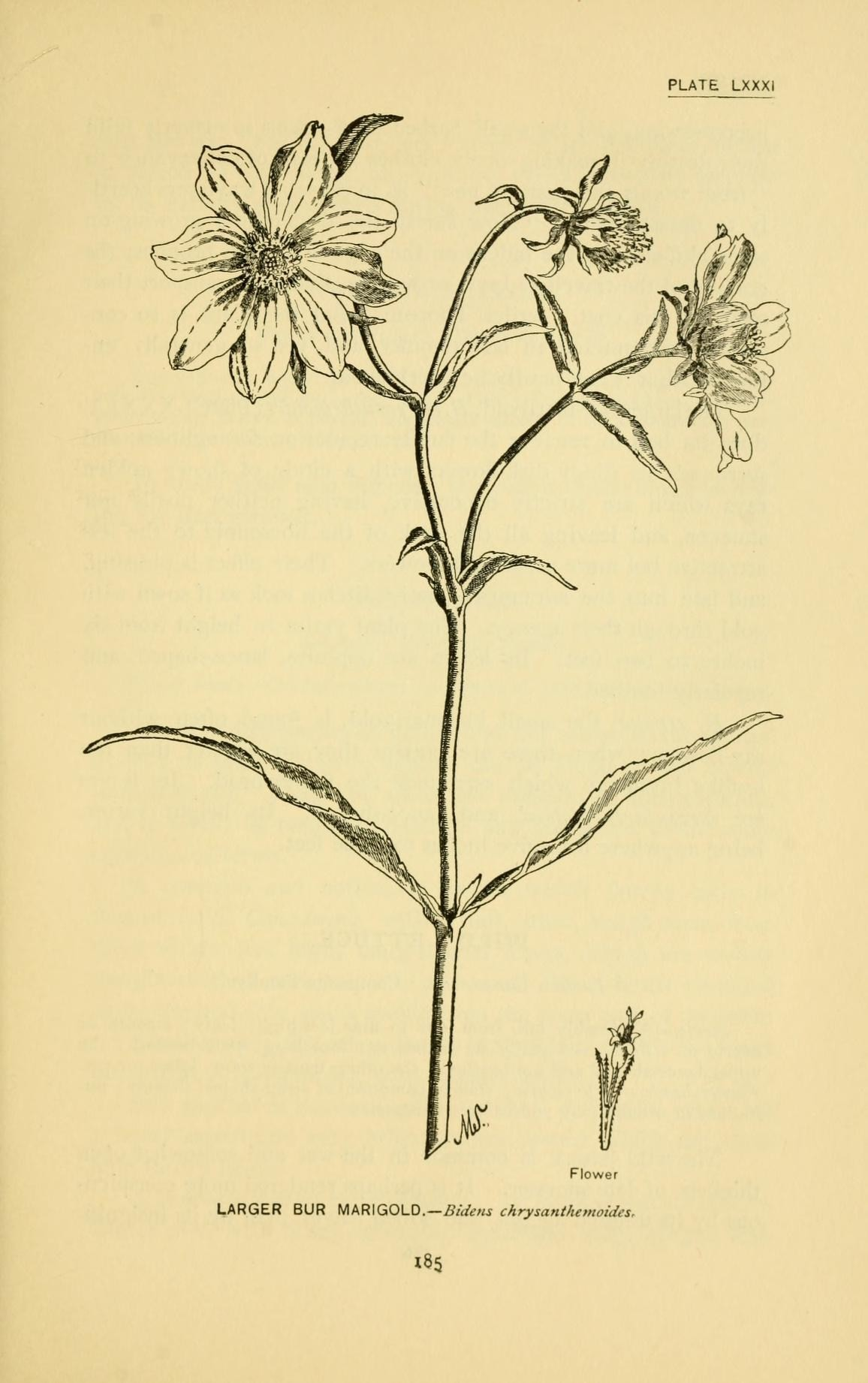
Drawing of larger bur marigold (Bidens chrysanthemoides) by Marion Satterlee, from How to Know the Wild Flowers by Frances Theodora Parsons, 1893.

== Artwork ==
Marion Satterlee was a friend of the naturalist and author Frances Theodora Parsons, and their walks together inspired Parsons to sit down and write her long-meditated first book, How to Know the Wild Flowers (1893). At Parsons' insistence, Satterlee illustrated both this book and its sequel, How to Know the Ferns (1899). For How to Know the Wild Flowers—which was the first field guide to North American wildflowers and a great popular success that stayed in print into the 1940s—she created 110 full-page black-and-white illustrations, which were complemented by color plates by Elsie Louise Shaw. The writer and New Yorker editor Katharine Sergeant Angell White, writing many decades later, termed the book a classic and remarked on the excellence of Satterlee's line drawings.

For How to Know the Ferns, Satterlee and a second artist, Alice Josephine Smith, created 42 full-page plates and over two dozen smaller black-and-white illustrations from pen drawings. (The illustrations include initials, either a.j.s or MS, to identify the artist of each drawing.) Satterlee also provided a description of the Woodwardia ferns.

== Personal history ==
Satterlee lived in New York City, and she apparently took some courses in plant illustration after Parsons asked her to illustrate How to Know the Wild Flowers. Other information about her origins and upbringing is scarce. Given the social circles she moved in as a friend of Parsons, she may be the Marion Satterlee who was a sister of lawyer and government official Herbert L. Satterlee. If so, her parents were George Bowen Satterlee and Sarah (Wilcox) Satterlee.
