= Elsie Louise Shaw =

Naturalist and botanical artist

Elsie Louise Shaw (1862–1940) was an American naturalist and botanical illustrator, many of whose watercolors are now in the collection of the Gray Herbarium at Harvard University.

== Biography ==
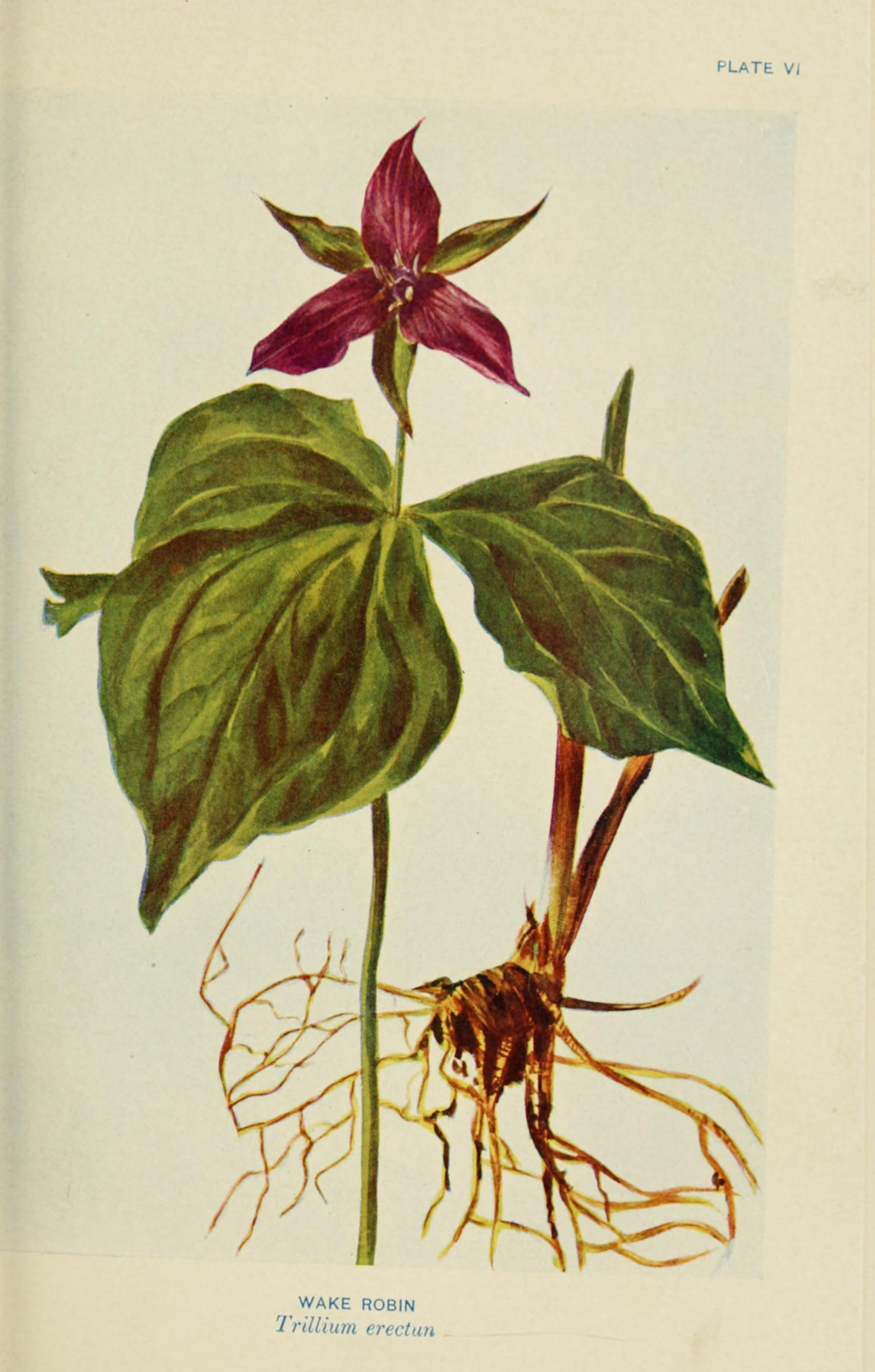
Wake robin (Trillium erectum) from According to Season (1902)

As an illustrator, Shaw provided 48 full-page color plates for Frances Theodora Parsons' book How to Know the Wild Flowers (1893), which was the first field guide to North American wildflowers. It was something of a sensation: the first printing sold out in five days, and it was praised by Theodore Roosevelt and Rudyard Kipling, among others. The work as remained in print into the 21st century, although most later editions did not include Shaw's color plates (although they did include the black-and-white illustrations by Marion Satterlee).

Shaw also illustrated another of Parsons' books about wildflowers, According to Season (1902) with 32 full-page color plates.

Shaw collected specimens of eastern North American wildflowers for the Gray Herbarium as well as for the University of Maine and the New England Botanical Club. She painted watercolors from these specimens—sometimes in the field—as well as from specimens collected by botanists like J. Franklin Collins, Merritt Lyndon Fernald, C.D. Lippincott, and Arthur H. Norton. Her "wonderfully accurate" paintings often show a small grouping of flowers on the stem with their leaves.

Her paintings were mounted and bound into eight folios by her family and donated to the Gray Herbarium. The collection covers the years 1887–1934. The folios are organized into flower family groupings as follows:

- Folio 1: Adder's tongue to iris
- Folio 2: Orchids
- Folio 3: Sweet gale to crowfoot
- Folio 4: Barberry to pulse
- Folio 5: Wood sorrel to dogwood
- Folio 6: Heath to borage
- Folio 7: Mint to lobelia
- Folio 8: Composites
