= Annie E. Hoyle =

American botanical illustrator (1851–1931)

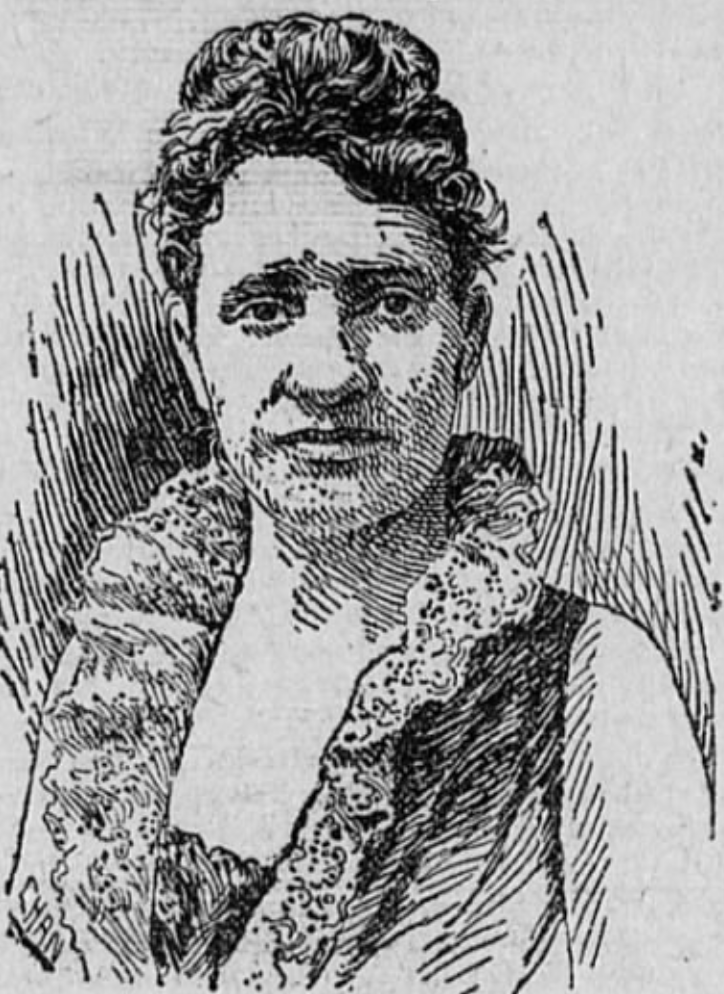
- Hoyle, from an 1891 newspaper
- Born: Annie Elizabeth Criswell; April 29, 1848 near Charles Town, Virginia, U.S.
- Died: March 7, 1931 (aged 82); Washington, D.C., U.S.
- Occupation: Botanical illustrator

Annie Elizabeth Criswell Hoyle (April 29, 1848 – March 7, 1931) was an artist from West Virginia who worked in the United States Forest Service from 1907 until 1930. She illustrated The Pine Trees of the Rocky Mountain Region by botanist George Sudworth.

== Early life and education ==
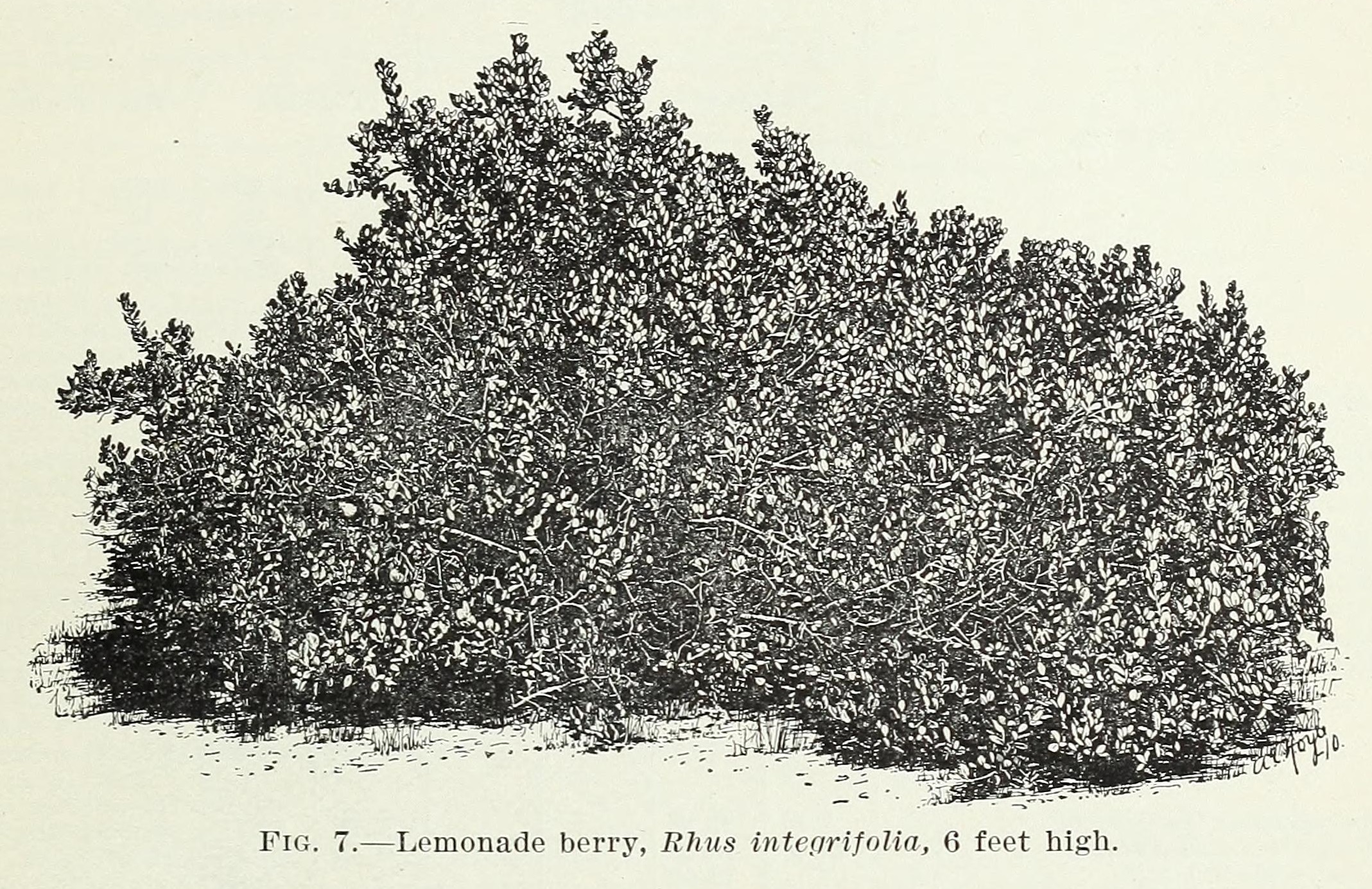
Hoyle's illustration of lemonade berry (Rhus integrifolia)

Annie Elizabeth Criswell was born on a farm near Charles Town, Virginia, the daughter of F. Thomas Criswell and Marie (or Moriah) Scott Criswell. She attended Louden Park Seminary in Maryland, and the Rouzee School of Fine Arts in Washington, D.C.. She pursued further study under George H. Story at the National Academy of Design. She also studied at the Julien School in Paris, with Henry Mosler, and anatomical drawing in London at the Royal College of Surgeons. She also studied with Jerome Phillips Uhl.

Hoyle studied plant morphology and botany at the US National Museum of Natural History and at the Bureau of Plant Industry, under Joseph Painter and Ivar Tidestrom.

== Career ==
Hoyle painted portraits, sculpted decorative medallions, and taught art from her studio in Washington. In 1891 she was described as "among the best known of the women artists of the city." She spoke on "Art in Paris" at a 1900 meeting of the League of American Pen Women.

Hoyle started working for the Forest Service in 1907, the year her husband died, when she was 49 years old. She created over 160 drawings of range plants for the Division of Range Research. She illustrated two textbooks by Arthur W. Sampson, Range and Pasture Management and Native American Forage Plants, and The Pine Trees of the Rocky Mountain Region by George Sudworth. She requested five extensions of time upon reaching retirement age. She finally retired on August 31, 1930, at the age of 80.

== Personal life ==
Criswell married James Lawrence Hoyle in 1868, in Washington D.C. They had four children. Her daughter Gertie died as a young child. Her husband died in 1907, and she died in 1931, at the age of 82, in Washington, D.C.
