= Mary Boomer Page =

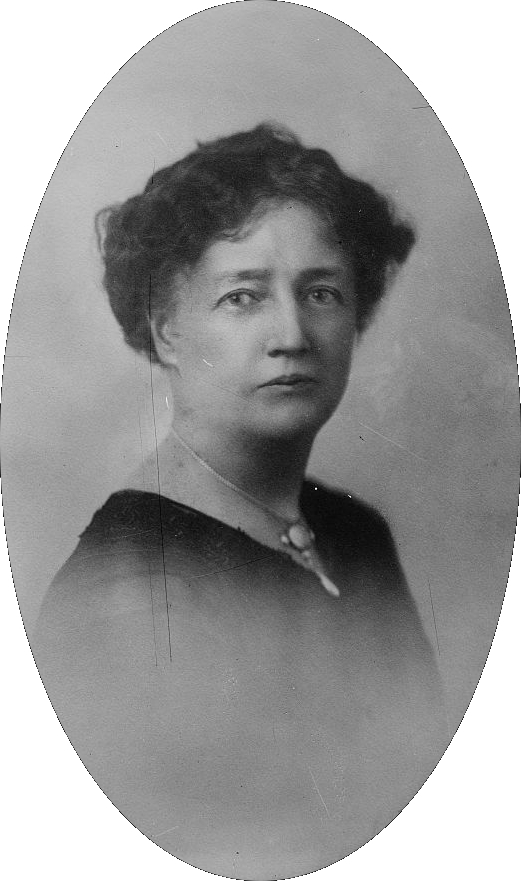

Mary Boomer Page (? - December 3, 1927) of Chicago, Illinois was director of the Gertrude House settlement and president of the Kindergarten Literature Company.
