= Charlotte Hardcastle =

New Zealand botanical artist (1828–1908)

- Born: 1828; Abingdon, Berkshire, United Kingdom
- Died: 11 January 1908 (aged 79–80); Whanganui, New Zealand
- Known for: Botanical illustrations
- Spouse: Edward Hardcastle (m. 1868; died 1886)

Charlotte Hardcastle (1828 – 11 January 1908) was a British-born New Zealand botanical illustrator and still-life artist.

== Personal life ==
Charlotte Hardcastle was born in 1828 in Abingdon, Berkshire. Her parents were William Hardcastle and Maria Edgington.

Harcastle moved to Melbourne, Australia, in July 1868. The following month, she married Edward Hardcastle, and the two later emigrated to Hokitika, New Zealand. They had two children while in Hokitika: Edward Patrick Edgington Murrough (born 1869) and Kathleen Charlotte Maud (born 1872).

The couple moved to Whanganui in 1877, and later to Wellington and Nelson. After the death of Edward in 1886, Charlotte and her daughter eventually returned to Whanganui, where she died on 11 January 1908.

== Artwork ==
Hardcastle exhibited her botanical and bird illustrations several times between the 1850s and 1870s. While in the United Kingdom, she exhibited at the Royal Society of British Artists, British Institution, and the Royal Academy of Arts. Her studies were also exhibited at the 1877 Exhibition of Art, Science, and Industry, held in Whanganui. Six of her flower studies, dating to the 1850s–1860s, are in Whanganui's Sarjeant Gallery collection.
