= Beatrice Orchard Carter =

South African botanical illustrator

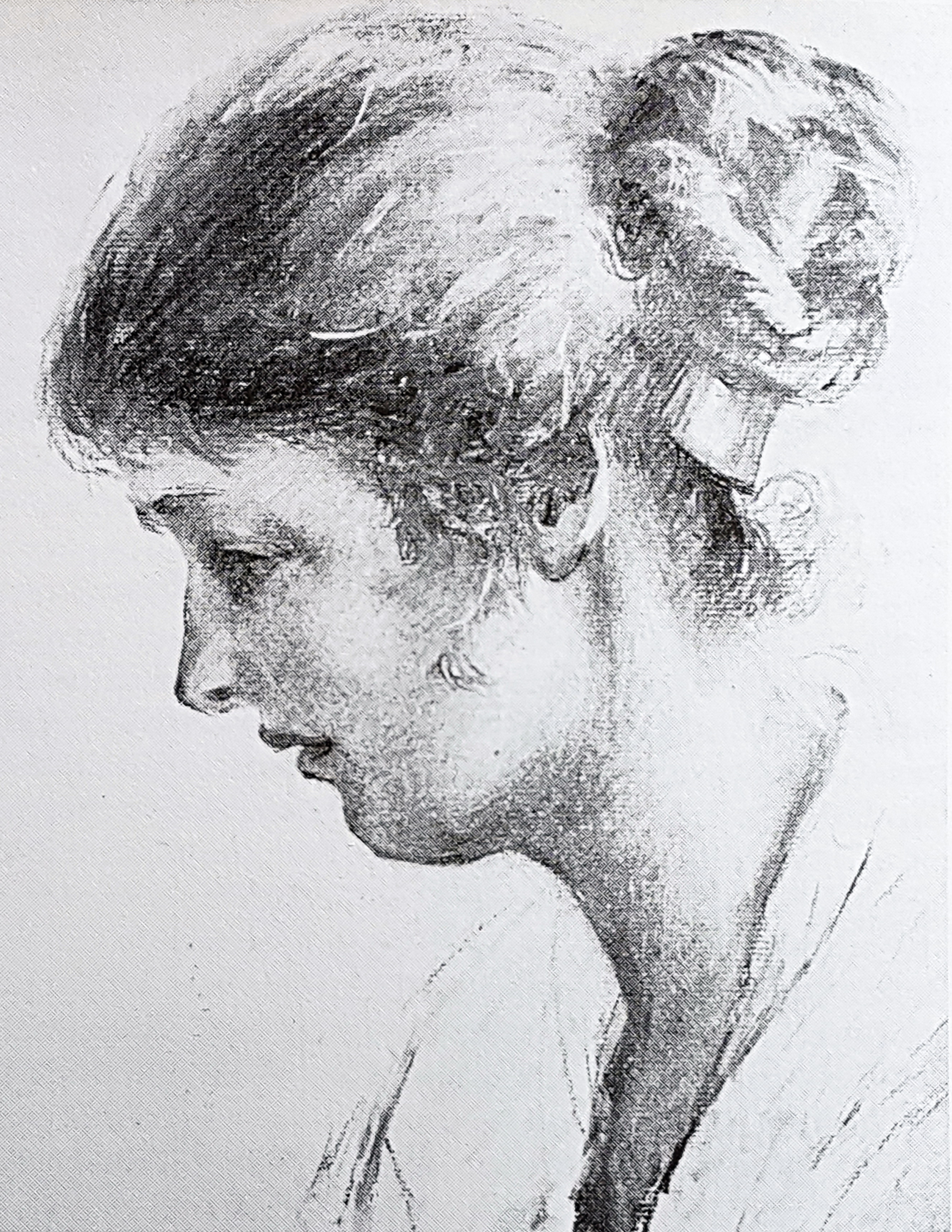
- Self-portrait of Beatrice Orchard Carter
- Born: 1889; King William's Town
- Died: 1939, November; Cape Town
- Citizenship: South Africa
- Education: Queenstown (Arts)
- Occupation: Botanical illustrator

Beatrice Orchard Carter (1889 King William's Town - November 1939 Cape Town) was a South African botanical illustrator.

== Life ==
Educated in King William's Town and East London, she trained in art at Queenstown and later at the Art School in Cape Town. During and after her studies she produced ophthalmic drawings for an oculist, D. J. Wood. She was appointed as artist at the Bolus Herbarium in Cape Town in 1926, staying on until her death. Her early death left unfinished much of the art work she had begun.

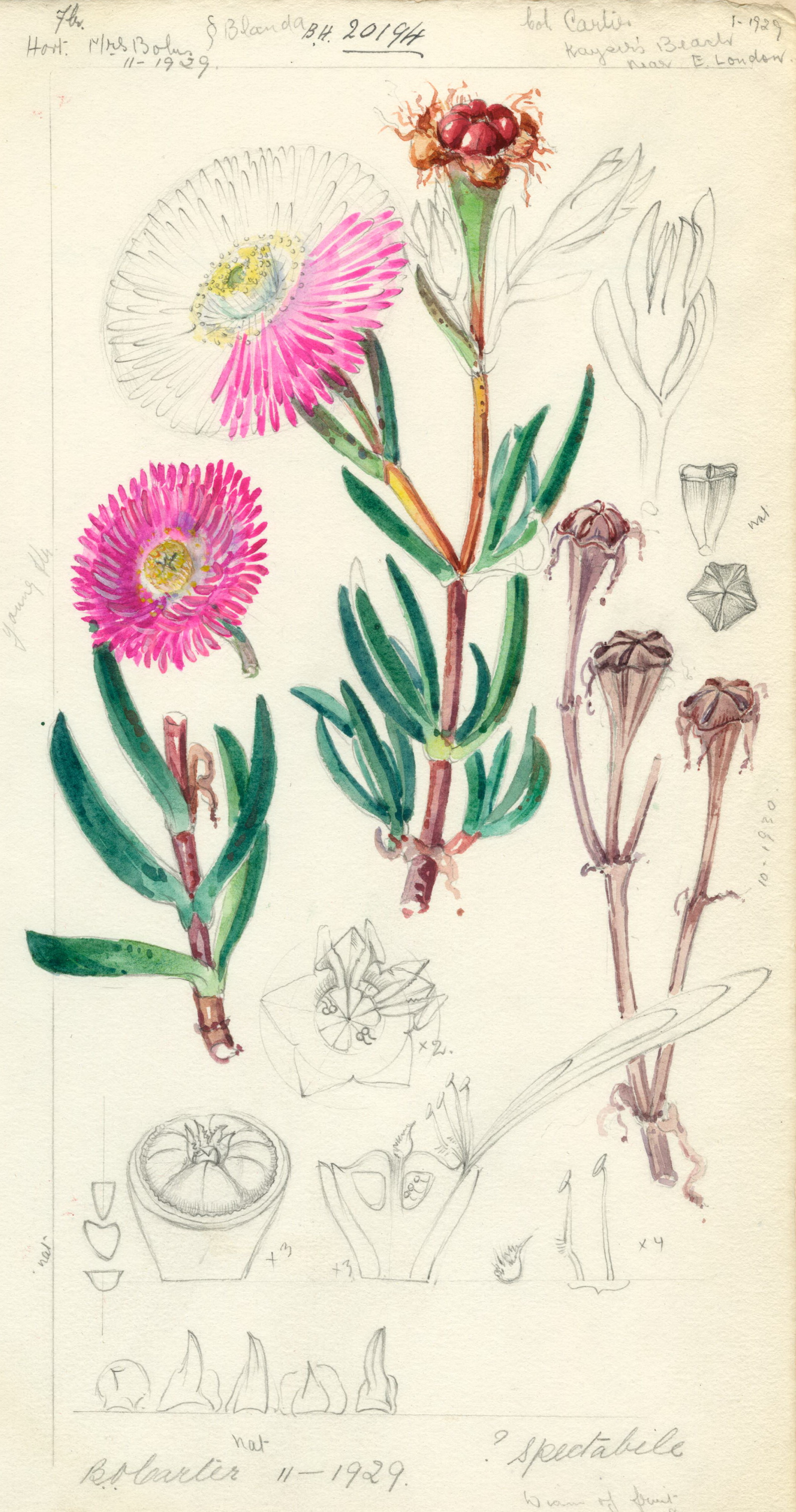
Lampranthus spectabilis

She illustrated a variety of books and projects, particularly the Mesembryanthemaceae for Louisa Bolus and Hans Herre.
