= Emily Jane Thwaits =

South African botanical illustrator

- Born: 1860; Cape Town
- Died: 21 February 1906 (aged 45–46); Cape Town
- Citizenship: South Africa
- Occupation: Botanical illustrator

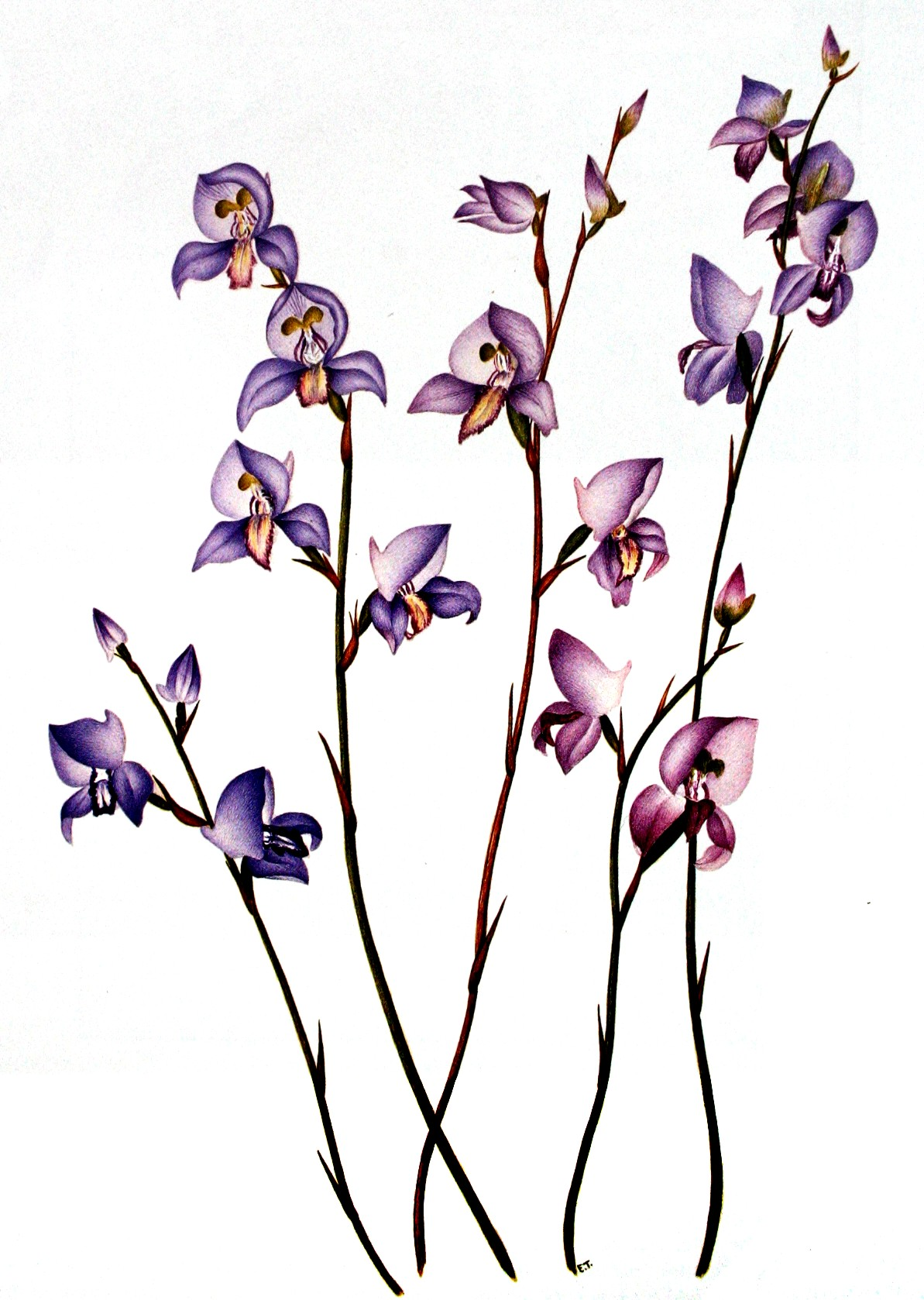
Disa purpurascens Bolus

Emily Jane Thwaits (c. 1860 in Cape Town – 21 February 1906 in Cape Town) was a South African botanical illustrator.

== Biography ==
Emily was one of a family of seven, her sibling Frances Thwaits being another noted botanical illustrator who had contributed original paintings for Rudolf Marloth's "Flora of South Africa". Their grandfather, Thomas Thwaits, had come to Cape Town from England and had become art master at a school in Roeland Street founded by the Rev. James J. Beck.
