= Ethel May Dixie =

South African artist (1876–1973)

- Born: 9 May 1876; Sea Point, Cape Town
- Died: 11 October 1973 (aged 97); Rondebosch, Cape Town
- Citizenship: South Africa
- Occupation: Botanical artist

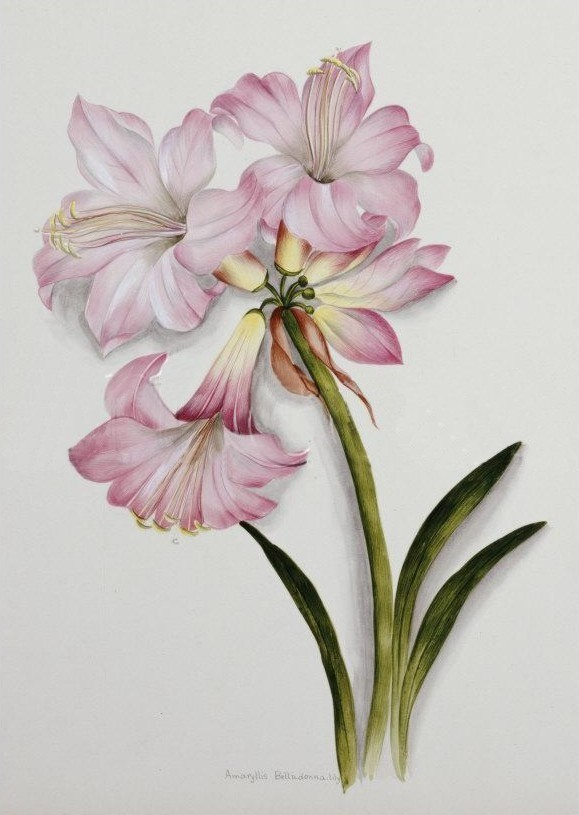
Amaryllis belladonna by Ethel Dixie, c. 1910

Ethel May Dixie (9 May 1876 in Sea Point, Cape Town – 11 October 1973 in Rondebosch, Cape Town) was a South African botanical artist.

Dixie was largely self-taught unlike her older sister who enjoyed the benefits of tuition by Thomas Bowler. Nonetheless, she was the principal artist for Rudolf Marloth's The Flora of South Africa. Many of the original plates for this work, were destroyed by a fire at the publisher. She was also a lecturer at the Cape Town School of Art. Her work can be found at the Brenthurst Library in Johannesburg, the Carnegie Library archives at the University of Stellenbosch, MuseuMAfricA in Johannesburg, National Botanical Institutes in Cape Town and Pretoria, the South African embassies in London, Rome, and New York, and in numerous private collections.

Dixie's niece, Dorothy Barclay, was also a botanical artist.

== Publications ==
- The Flora of South Africa- with Rudolf Marloth 6 vols. (Cape Town, Darter Bros. & Co.; London, W. Wesley & Son, 1913–1932)
- Wild Flowers of the Cape of Good Hope – with Robert Harold Compton (Janda Press, Cape Town 1953)
- Two portfolios of prints published privately in the 1990s
