= Mary Ann Armstrong =

Botanical artist

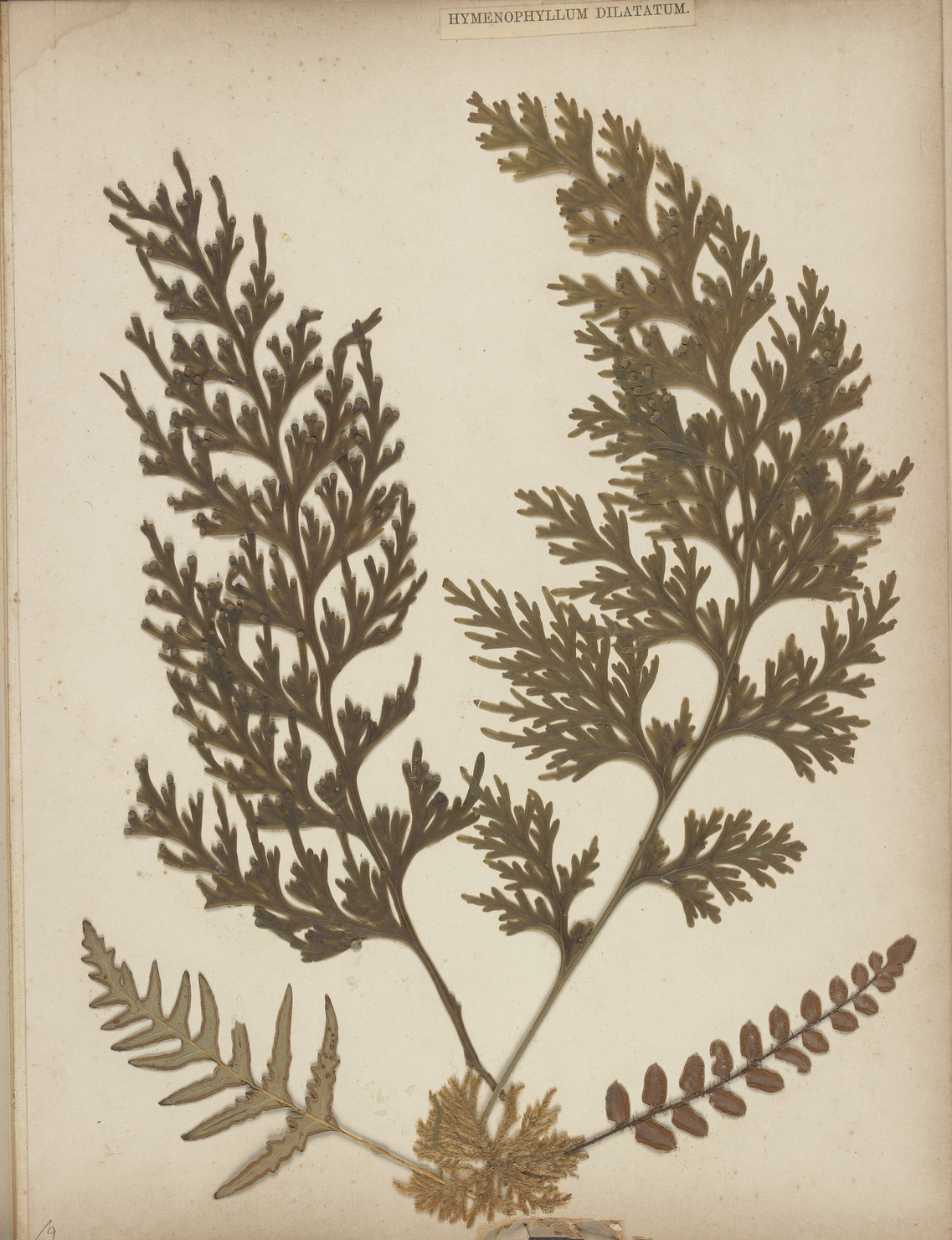
- Hymenophyllum dilatatum, Ferns of Australasia, State Library Victoria
- Born: 17 June 1838; Birmingham, England
- Died: 2 July 1910 (aged 72); Flemington, Melbourne, Australia
- Known for: Botanical art

Mary Ann Armstrong (née Newey, 17 June 1838, Birmingham, England – 2 July 1910, Flemington, Australia), also known as Mrs. C.C. Armstrong, was a British botanical fern artist who lived and worked in New Zealand and Australia. She compiled and artistically arranged fern specimens for a number of Australasia's ferns albums, including a series of professional gift books "The South Pacific Fern Album". Armstrong participated in a number of international and intercolonial exhibitions, where her ferns received commendation and were gifted to dignitaries.

== Life ==
Armstrong was born in a family of William and Margaret Newey of Birmingham, England. When her mother died, in 1853, she emigrated with her father, brothers and stepsisters to Victoria. In 1858, she married Charles Clark Armstrong, a coach runner and storekeeper who was also a native of Birmingham, and in early 1860s the couple with their two sons relocated to New Zealand. They resided in Dunedin, New Zealand, for next two decades, where their remaining eleven children were born.

In 1887 Armstrong and her husband moved to Melbourne, while their older son Charles Clark Jr. remained in Dunedin. After the sudden death of their daughter, Nellie, Mary Ann and her husband travelled to West Australia to care for their grandchildren. They eventually returned to the Melbourne area and settled with the family of their daughter Jennie. Mary Ann died in Flemington on 2 July 1910 and is buried in Melbourne General Cemetery.

== Art ==
Armstrong developed a keen interest in collecting and arranging fern specimens, being active from roughly the late 1870s to the 1890s. She artistically arranged and scientifically notated ferns in albums and framed some of the compositions into decorative, collage-like landscapes. Her ornamental and handcrafted fern work reflects the domestic tradition of 19th century women's decorative arts, however unlike others examples of feminine tradition, Armstrong's botanical art was displayed at a series of international and intercolonial exhibitions between 1879 and 1889.

She used botanical watercolors, miniature painting and needlework, as well as natural objects such as ferns, seaweeds, shells and seed for arranging her compositions. Another distinctive feature of Armstrong's works is their commercial success among the general public generated by the reputation she established through her commendable exhibition record. Her commercial fern work also capitalised on the popular appeal of the fern as a tourist icon and national symbol. In the mid-to-late 1880s Mary Ann's fern albums entitled New Zealand Fern existed in public institutions and private collections. Her later South Pacific Fern Album (1889) represents the culmination of her career blending its botanical, aesthetic, and commercial aspects together with the burgeoning discourses of tourism and nationalism. In addition to albums, Armstrong produced ferns mounted on postcards and paper goods with fern transfers selling them to local booksellers and fancy goods shops.

Nowadays Armstrong's albums can be found such institutions as the National Library of New Zealand, the Universities of Wellington and Waikato, Australian National University Library, the National Library of Australia, and the State Libraries of New South Wales and Victoria, as well as at Harvard, the University of Georgia and UCLA.

== Exhibitions ==
- 1879 – International Exhibition, Sydney
- 1880–1881 – Melbourne International Exhibitions, Exhibition Building, Melbourne, VIC
- 1882 – New Zealand International Exhibition, Christchurch, NZ
- 1886 – Colonial and Indian Exhibition, London, England
- 1888 – Centennial International Exhibition, Melbourne, VIC
