= Elisa-Honorine Champin =

French watercolorist and lithographer

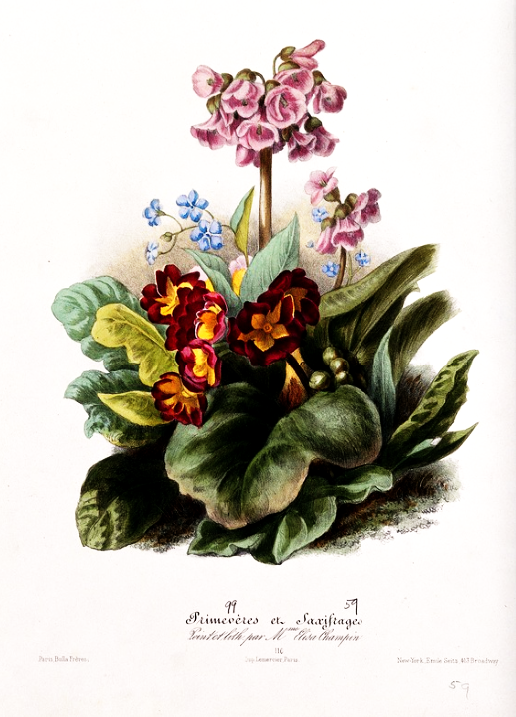
Primula and Saxifraga species

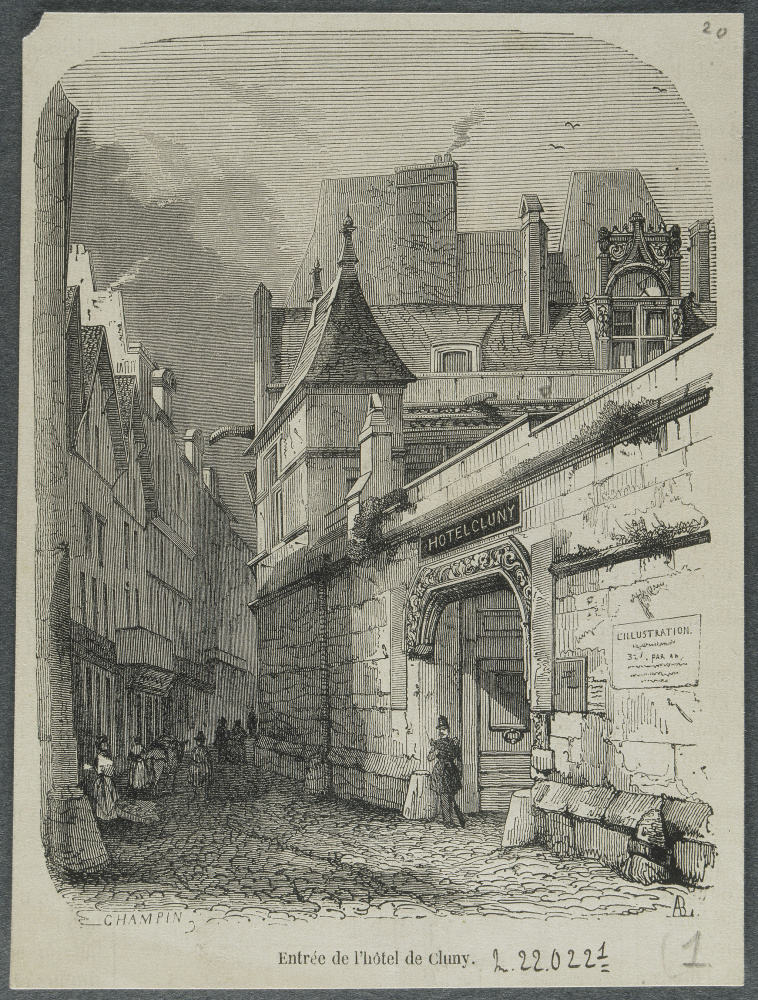
"Entrée de l'hôtel de Cluny"

Elisa-Honorine Champin (born c. 1807, Paris and died 1871, Sceaux, Hauts-de-Seine) was a French watercolourist and lithographer who specialised in painting flowers, fruit and vegetables. She studied under Mlle. Adèle Riché and exhibited at the Salon under her maiden name, Pitet, from 1833 to 1836. After marrying French painter Jean-Jacques Champin (1796-1860) in 1837 she exhibited under her married name. She contributed a series of vegetable posters to Le Jardin Potager (1850-1884) - these were printed by Lemercier & Cie. for use as advertisements by the firm Vilmorin-Andrieux, a leading wholesaler of seeds.
