= Auriol Batten =

South African botanical illustrator

- Born: 1918, March,2; Pietermaritzburg
- Died: 2015, June,2; East London
- Citizenship: South Africa
- Education: University of Natal (B.SC)
- Occupation: Botanical Illustrator

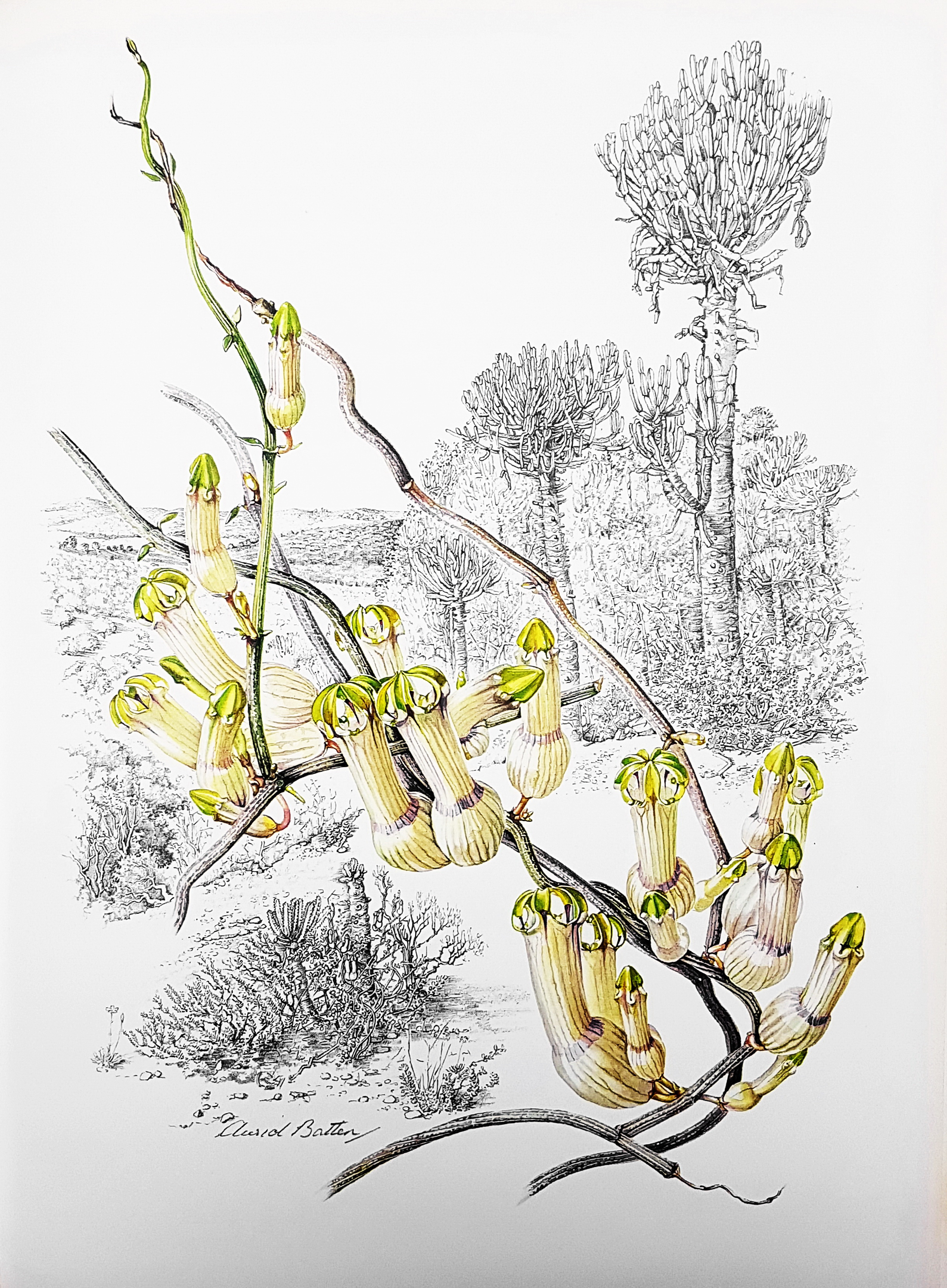
Ceropegia ampliata E.Mey.

Auriol Ursula Luyt Batten (née Taylor) (2 March 1918, in Pietermaritzburg – 2 June 2015, in East London) was a South African botanical illustrator.

Auriol Batten obtained a B.Sc. in botany at the University of Natal in Pietermaritzburg, and studied art at the Durban Technical College. She settled in East London after her marriage and began painting wild flowers.

She was co-illustrator with her cousin, Hertha Bokelmann, of 'Wild Flowers of the Eastern Cape Province' (1966) and 'Wild Flowers of the Tsitsikama' (1967). She painted all the illustrations for her own book 'Flowers of Southern Africa' (1986), and donated the originals to the nation, to be kept at the National Botanical Institute in Pretoria.

Auriol Batten received a gold medal from the Royal Horticultural Society for her illustrations in 'Flowers of Southern Africa' and an honorary doctorate from Rhodes University. Named in her honour were the plants Lachenalia aurioliae, Albuca batteniana, Polycarena batteniana and Diascia batteniana.
