= Dorothy Barclay =

South African botanical illustrator (1892–1940)

- Born: 1892; Cape Town
- Died: 1940 (aged 47–48); Cape Town
- Citizenship: South Africa
- Occupation: Botanical Illustrator

Priestleya villosa

Dorothy Barclay (1892 Cape Town - 1940 Cape Town) was a South African botanical illustrator, and the niece of Ethel May Dixie.

The Wild Flower Protection Society had been started by the Mountain Club of South Africa in 1912 and had published 'Nature Notes', edited by Louisa Bolus and illustrated by Dorothy Barclay.

== Works illustrated ==
- 'Springbok Rympies en Stories' - Willem Versfeld - Townshend, Taylor & Snashall, Cape Town (1911) - Afrikaans translations of Mother Goose rhymes
- 'A Book of South African Flowers' - Barclay, Bolus and Steer - Juta & Co., Cape Town (1925)
- 'A Guide to the Flora of the Cape Peninsula' - Margaret Levyns (1929)
- 'A Second Book of South African Flowers' - Barclay, Bolus and Steer - Juta & Co., Cape Town (1936)
