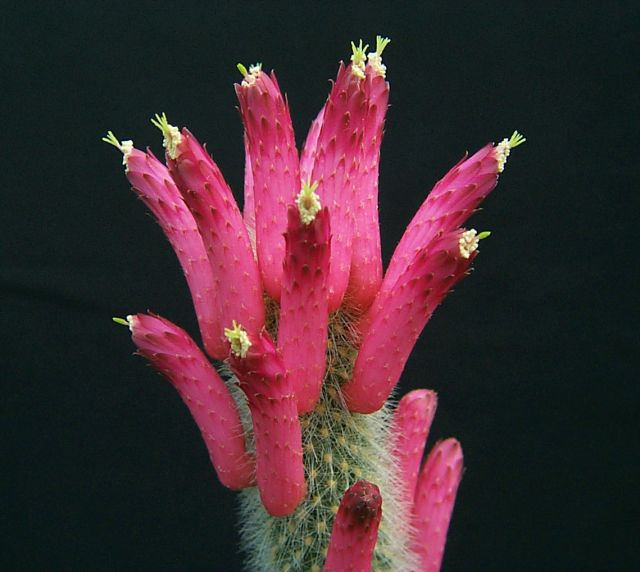

Conservation status
- Least Concern (IUCN 3.1)

Scientific classification
- Kingdom: Plantae
- Clade: Tracheophytes
- Clade: Angiosperms
- Clade: Eudicots
- Order: Caryophyllales
- Family: Cactaceae
- Subfamily: Cactoideae
- Genus: Cleistocactus
- Species: C. brookeae

Binomial name
- Cleistocactus brookeae Cárdenas 1952

Synonyms
- Cleistocactus brookeae var. flavispinus F.Ritter 1980; Cleistocactus brookeae subsp. vulpis-cauda (F.Ritter & Cullman) Mottram 2002; Cleistocactus vulpis-cauda F.Ritter & Cullman 1962; Cleistocactus wendlandiorum Backeb. 1955

= Cleistocactus brookeae =

Species of cactus

Cleistocactus brookeae is a species of columnar cacti in the genus Cleistocactus.

== Description ==
Cleistocactus brookeae grows as a shrub with sparsely branched, upright to columnar shoots up to 50 cm (20 in) long and 3 to 4.5 cm (1.2 to 1.8 in) in diameter. There are 22 to 25 ribs. The areoles on it are close together. 25 to 40 greyish-white or slightly yellowish spines, up to 1 cm (0.39 in) long, emerge from them, which cannot be distinguished into central and radial spines.

The red to orange flowers are up to 5 cm (2.0 in) long and have a diameter of 8 mm (0.31 in). The flowers are bent upwards in a right-angled S-shape above the pericarpell and flattened laterally. They are also somewhat sac-like bulging immediately above the pericarpell. The mouth is askew. The purple fruits reach a diameter of 8 to 10 mm (0.31 to 0.39 in).

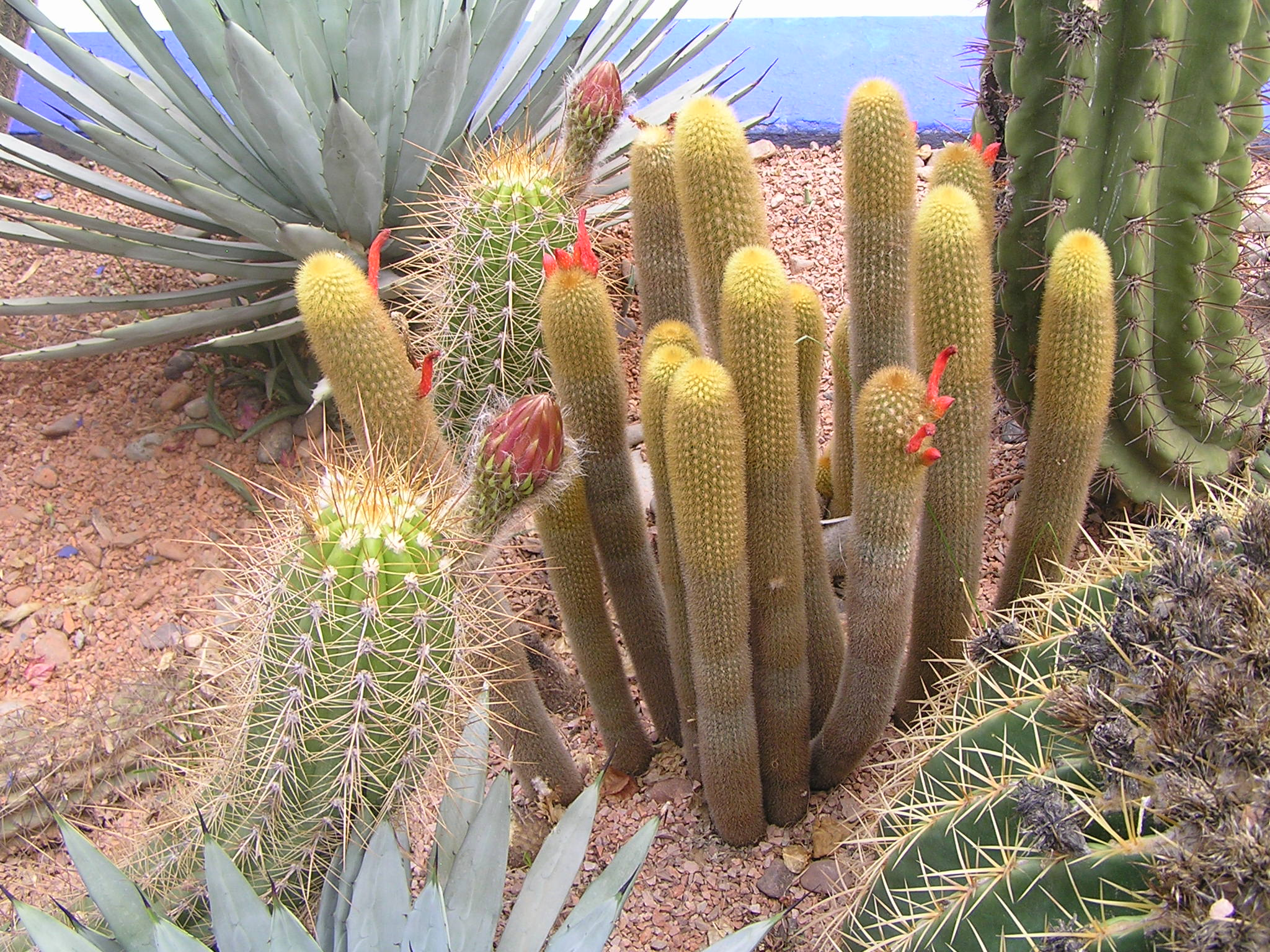

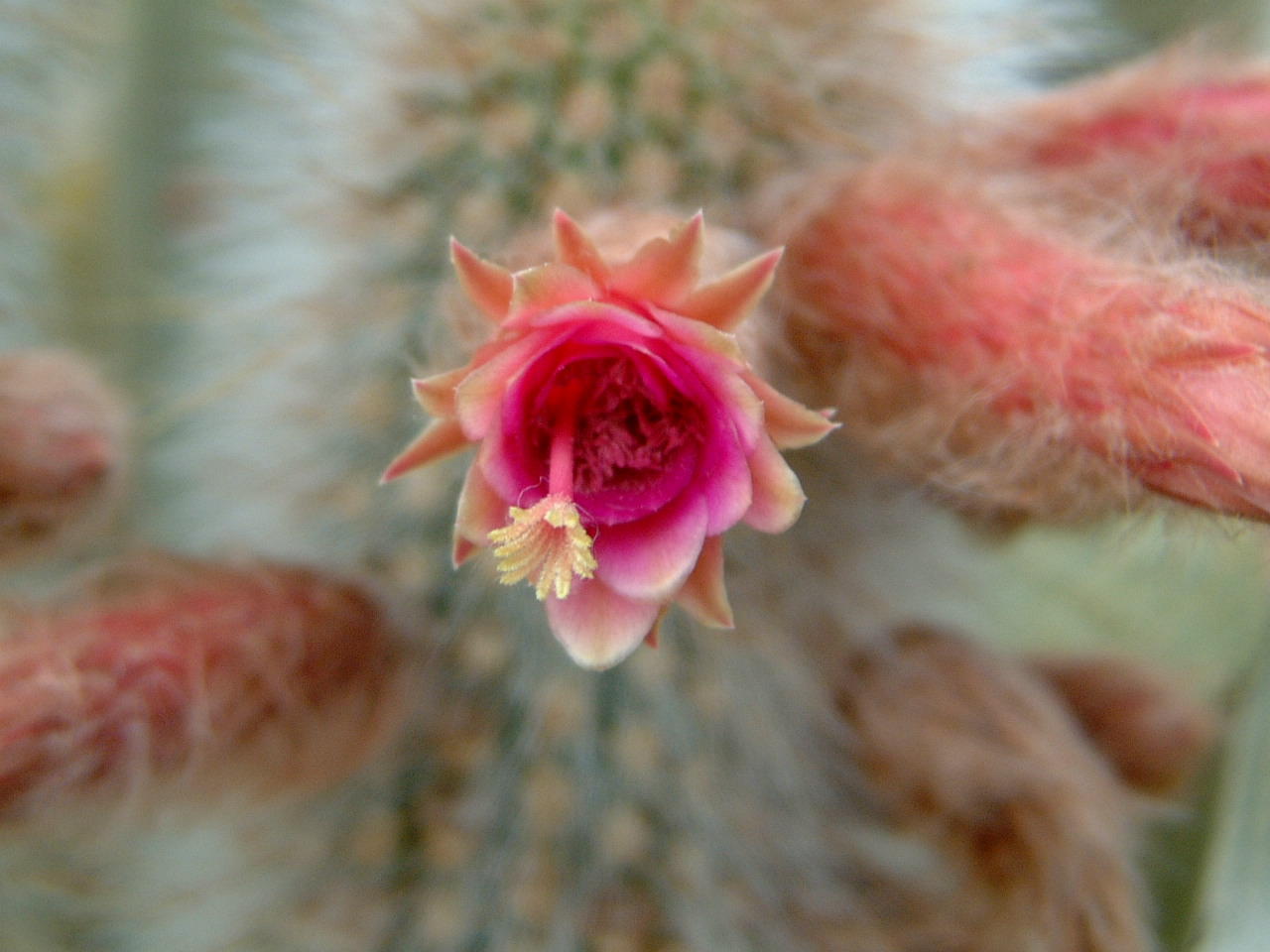

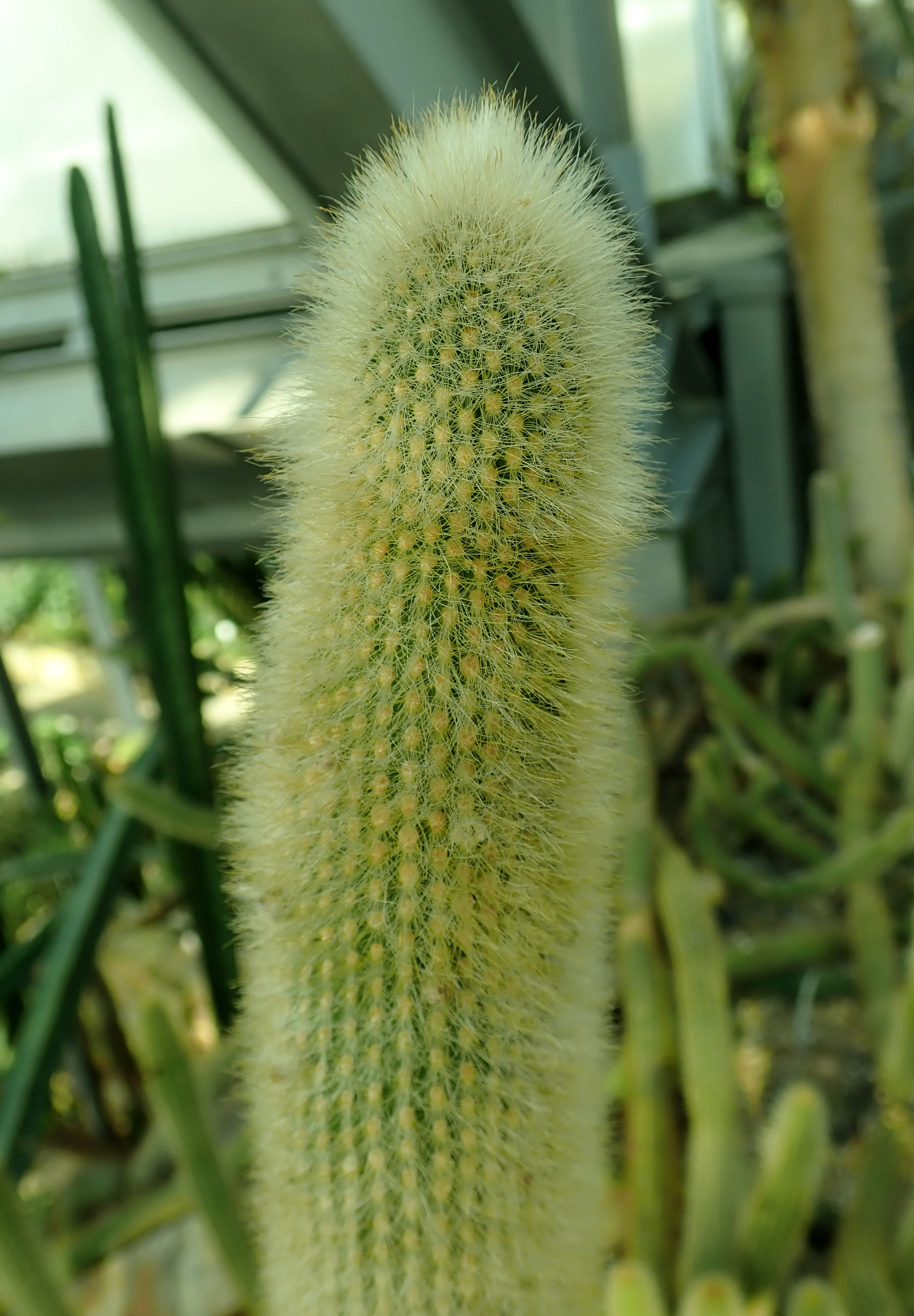

== Distribution ==
Cleistocactus brookeae found growing on steep cliffs and rocky slopes close to rivers in the Bolivian departments of Chuquisaca and Santa Cruz at altitudes of 800 to 1300 meters.

== Taxonomy ==
The first description was in 1952 by Martín Cárdenas. The specific epithet brookeae honors the Bolivian plant collector Winifred M. Brooke.
