= Gertrud Bartusch =

German botanical illustrator

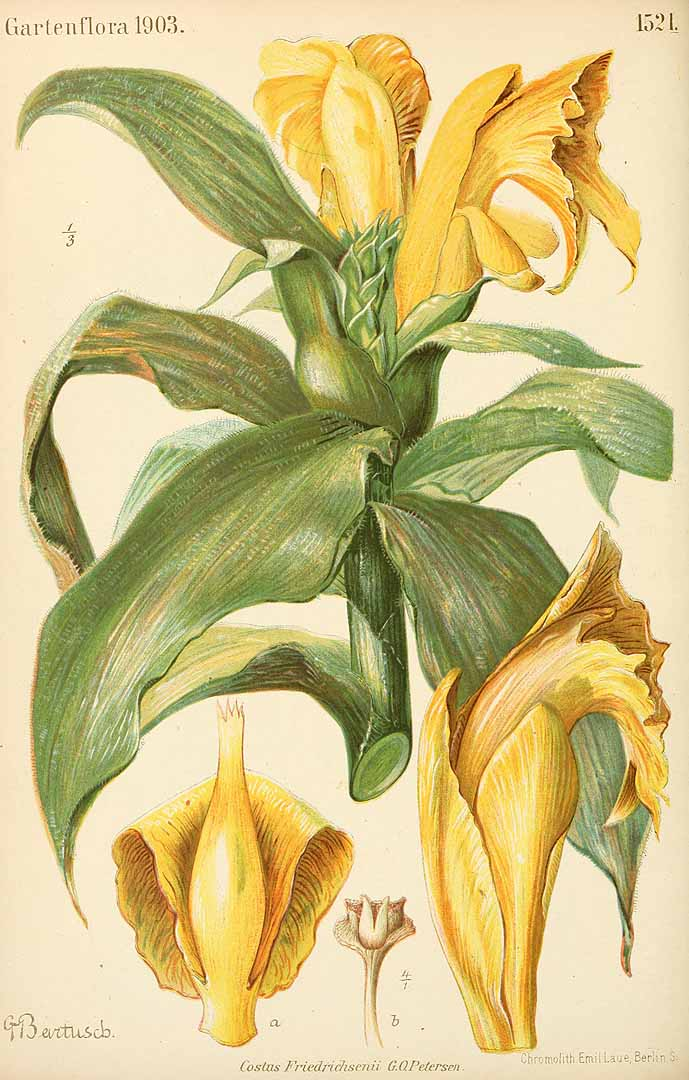
Costus villosissimus

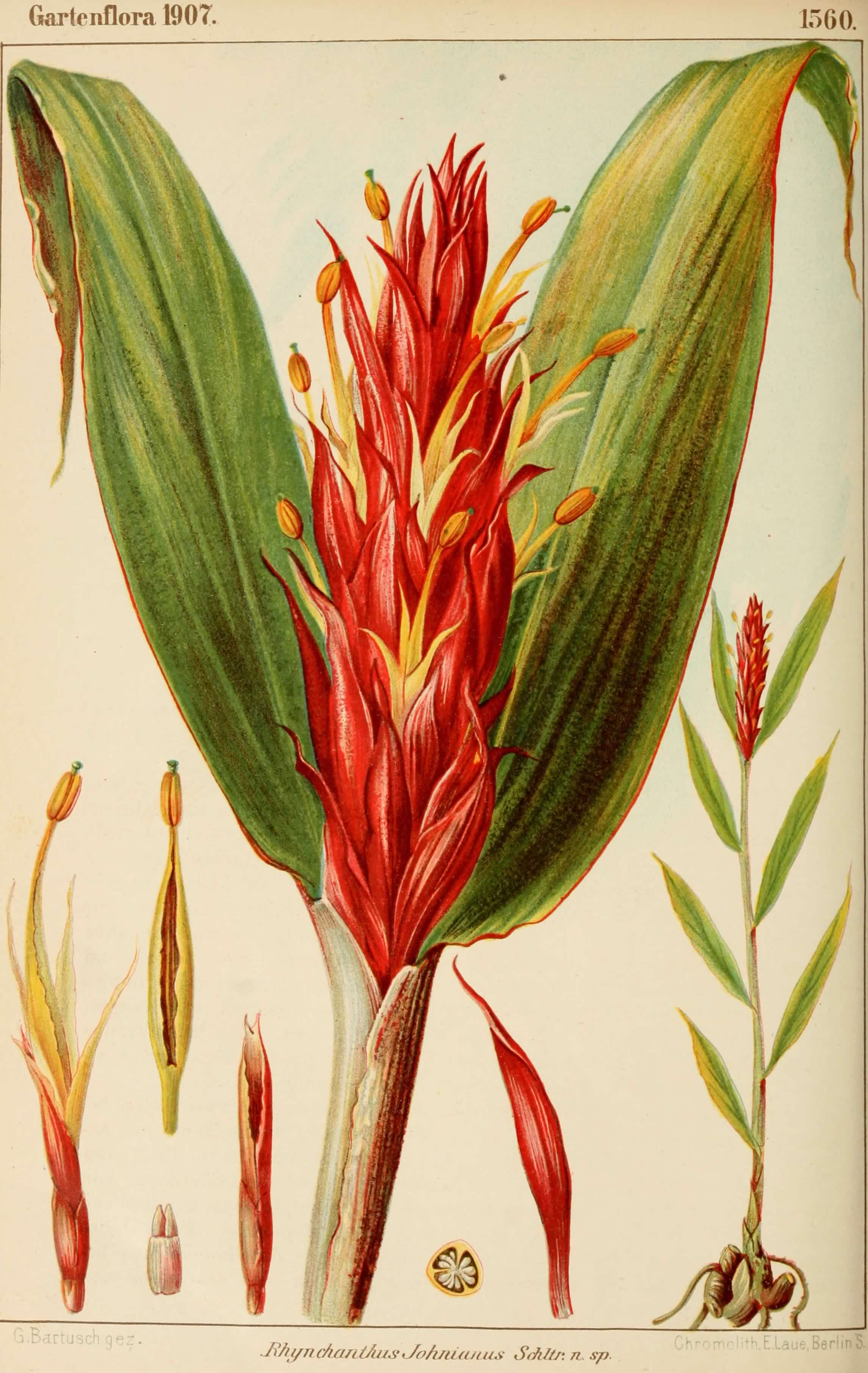
Rhynchanthus johnianus

Gertrud Bartusch (died in Munich, January 1917) was a German botanical illustrator known for her plates in 'Fragmenta Phytographiae Australiae Occidentalis' (1904) by F.L.E.Diels & E.Pritzel, 'Flora der deutschen Schutzgebiete in der Südsee', t. 3* (1901) by Schumann, K.M., and Lauterbach, K., and Rudolf Marloth's 'Flora of South Africa'. She has sometimes been confused with Gertrud Fuchs-Henel, the wife of Carl Adolf Georg Lauterbach. She worked at the Botanical Museum in Berlin.
