= Hertha Bokelmann =

Spanish-born South African botanical illustrator

Streptocarpus rexii

Hertha Ludovica Bokelmann (née Faekle) (22 August 1915 Barcelona - 10 February 2005) was a Spanish-born South African botanist and botanical illustrator.

She was trained in horticulture and botany at the Technical High School in Ulm, Germany. Arriving in South Africa in June 1937, she worked for a year at the Botanical Garden of Stellenbosch University. She collected plant specimens which were passed on to the British Museum, while some 600 specimens, mainly from the Eastern Cape and Tsitsikama, are housed at the Compton Herbarium of Kirstenbosch National Botanical Garden.

Bokelmann is best known for sharing the illustrating with her cousin by marriage, Auriol Batten, of 'Wild Flowers of the Eastern Cape Province' (1966) and 'Flowering Plants of the Tsitsikama Forest and Coastal National Park' (1967). Work on the latter book resulted in a close friendship with co-author Marjorie Courtenay-Latimer, who had retired to a farm in the Tsitsikama and had become interested in botany.
