= Mary Maud Page =

English-born South African botanical illustrator (1867–1925)

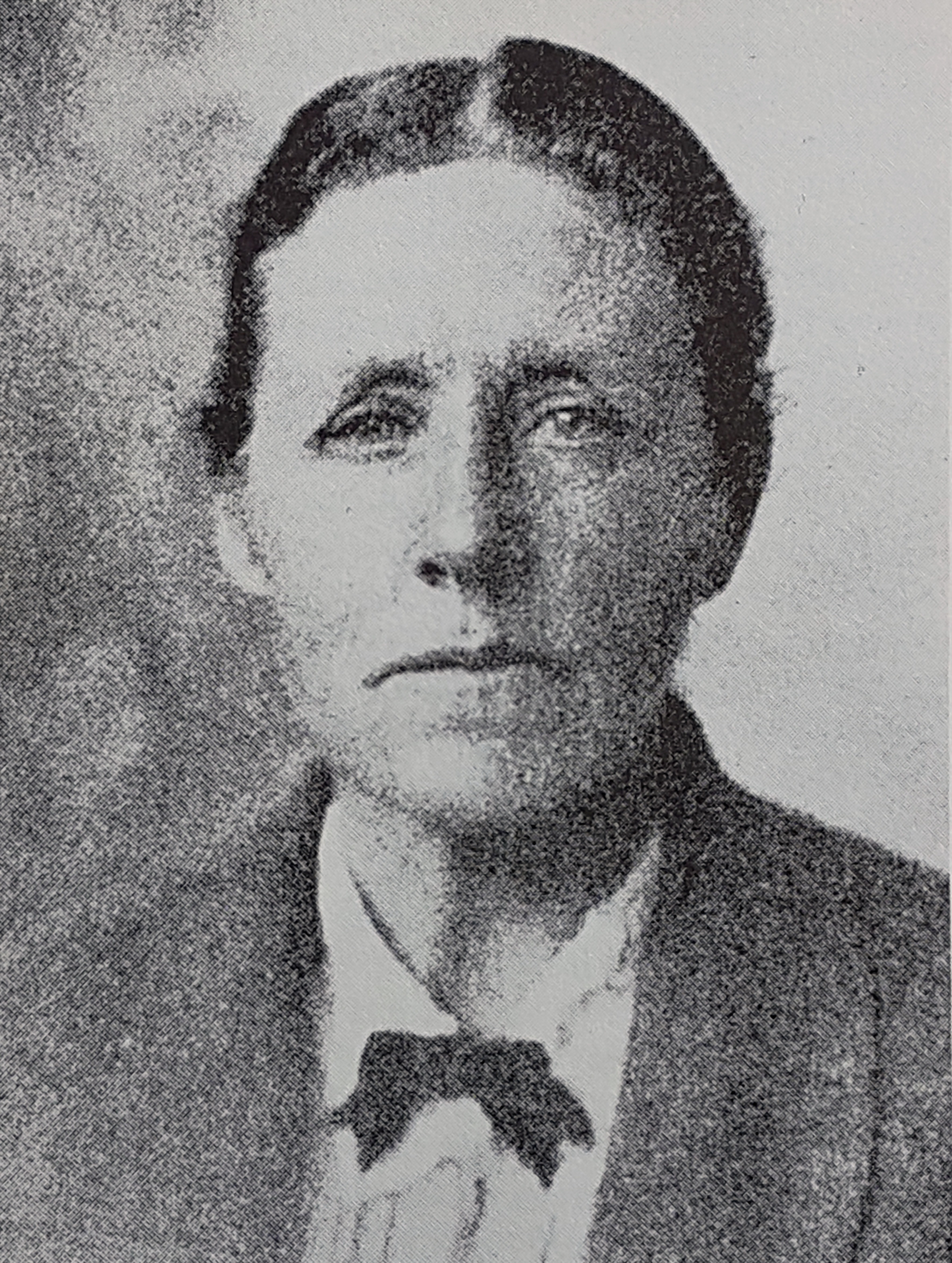
- Born: 21 September 1867; London
- Died: 8 February 1925 (aged 57); Cape Town
- Occupation: botanical illustrator
- Father: Nathaniel Page

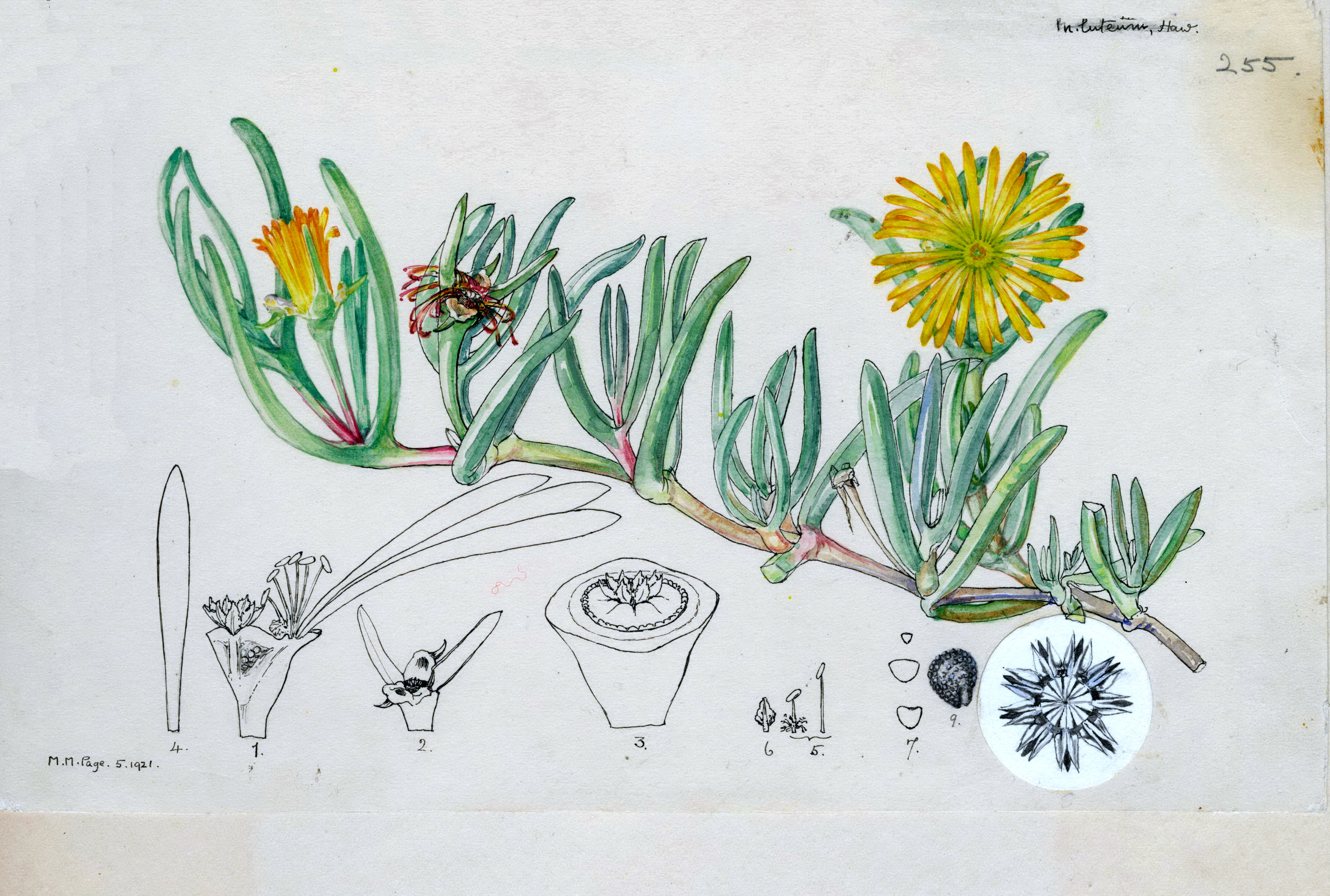
Malephora lutea

Mary Maud Page (21 September 1867 – 8 February 1925) was an English-born South African botanical illustrator, botanical collector and explorer. She was the daughter of Nathaniel Page, a former mayor of Croydon.

She studied painting, but due to failing eyesight changed to courses in wood-carving and metals and enamels, and became skilled in needlework, embroidery and lace-making. She also studied Braille in order to help a blind friend. When her father died and faced with her own failing health, she left for South Africa in July 1911. She settled in Dealesville in the Orange Free State at first, but soon moved to Bloemfontein in 1912. From there she visited Palapye and Pretoria, and toured Rhodesia and Basutoland, returning to the latter country a number of times. It was there that her interest in botany was born, starting a collection of plant specimens and helping a friend, Mrs Beaumont, to create a herbarium for use by the children of Morija. While visiting Cape Town in January 1915 she showed some flower illustrations to Louisa Bolus who was struck by their quality, and persuaded her to work at the Bolus Herbarium, an association which lasted until her death.

Most of her illustrations dealt with Aizoaceae, but she also depicted Iridaceae and orchids. Many of her paintings appeared in Flowering Plants of Africa and were used in books by Hans Herre. A handbook on culinary herbs written by her was published by the Royal Horticultural Society. She was commemorated in the now defunct plant genus Pagella Schönland (1921), but also in Conophytum pageae, Nemesia pageae, Crassula pageae, Erica pageana, the former taxa Psilocaulon pageae (now P. dinteri), Carpobrotus pageae (now C. mellei), and Erepsia pageae (now E. patula), and possibly also for Amphithalea pageae and Muraltia pageae.
