= List of Australian botanical illustrators =

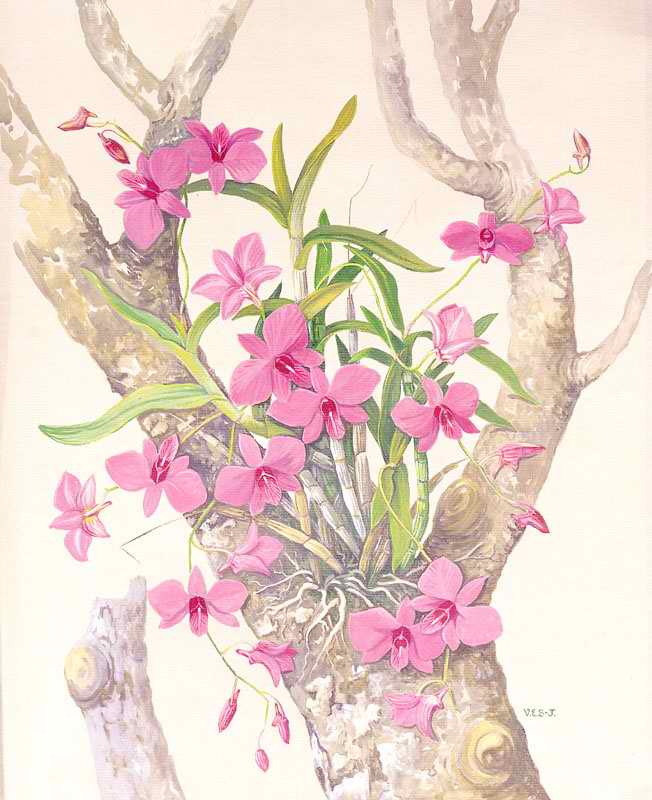
Cooktown Orchid (Vappodes phalaenopsis) by Vera Scarth-Johnson

This is a list of botanical illustrators who were/are active or born in Australia.

Botanical illustration involves the painting, drawing and illustration of plants and ecosystems. Often meticulously observed, the botanical art tradition combines both science and art, and botanical artists throughout the centuries have been active in collecting and cataloguing a huge variety of species.

== Australian botanical illustrators ==
=== A ===
- Mary Morton Allport (1806–1895) – born Birmingham, England
- Annick Ansselin – born in France, lives in Tasmania, Australia. Member of Botaniko
- Alison Marjorie Ashby (1901–1987) – botanical artist and plant collector
- Louisa Atkinson (1834–1872) – writer, botanist and illustrator

=== B ===
- Kim Bagot-Hiller (born 1975) – born in New South Wales
- Ferdinand Bauer (1760–1826) – born in Feldsberg, Austria; travelled on Matthew Flinders' expedition to Australia
- Susannah Blaxill – born in NSW, trained in UK and returned to Australia in 1992
- Eliza Blyth (1820–1894) – born in England

=== C ===
- Kaye Chin
- Margaret Castle – born in Kyabram, Victoria, Australia
- Elizabeth Vivienne Conabere (1929–2009) – born in Alexandra, Victoria, botanical artist, writer and conservationist

=== D ===
- Luke Davis (born 1982) – born in Victoria, Australia
- Edgar Dell (1901–2008) – born in England
- Pauline Dewar (born 1955) – born in Perth, Australia

=== E ===
- Lesley Elkan (born 1972) – born in Sydney
- Melinda Edstein – born in Sydney

=== F ===
- Susan Fereday (1815–1878) – born in Leicestershire, England
- Margaret Flockton (1861–1963) – born in Sussex, England
- Margaret Forrest (1844–1929) – born in Le Havre, France

=== G ===
- E. E. Gostelow (1866–1944) – born in Sydney, NSW
- Beverley Graham (1932–2010) – born in Melbourne, Victoria

=== H ===
- Tanya Hoolihan – born in western NSW
- Malcolm Ian Howie (1900–1936) – born in Creswick, Victoria.
- Annie Hughes – born in Sydney

=== I ===
- Anabella Innes (1826–1916) – born in Bathurst, died in Scotland. Her paintings are now kept at the National Museum of Australia in Canberra Born Annabella Innes in 1826 in Bathurst. She moved to Port Macquarie as a 16yo after the death of her father. She lived in Port Macquarie with her mother at her Uncle's home from 1843-1848. She published her watercolours under her married name Boswell.

=== L ===
- John Lewin (1770–1819) – born in England
- Angela Lober (born 1966) – born in Sydney
- Marina Lommerse – born in Stamford, England. Cited in: Artists of Perth, Editor: Gabi Mills, M&P Publishing, Perth, Australia, 2017

=== M ===
- Kathleen McArthur (1915–2001) – born in Brisbane, Queensland
- Edward Minchen (1852–1913) – born in Middle Swan, Perth, Western Australia
- Steffi Michalski (born 1995) – born in New South Wales, Australia
- Carolyn Murdoch (born 1959) lives in Perth, Western Australia

=== N ===
- Philippa Nikulinsky (born 1942) – born in Kalgoorlie, WA
- Leonie Norton (born 1948) Sydney NSW

=== P ===
- Sydney Parkinson (c. 1745–1771) – born in Scotland
- Emily Pelloe (1878–1941) – born in St Kilda, Victoria
- Jacqueline Pemberton (born 1958) – born in Andover, England
- Jenny Phillips (born 1949)
- Olive Pink (1884–1975) – born in Hobart, Tasmania

=== R ===
- Lewis Roberts (born 1950)
- Celia Rosser (born 1930)
- Ellis Rowan (1847?–1922) – born near Longwood, Victoria

=== S ===
- Vera Scarth-Johnson (1912–1999) – born in Yorkshire, England
- Margaret Stones (1920–2018) – born in Colac, Victoria
- Louise Janette Saunders (born 1955) – born in Benalla, Victoria

=== T ===
- Emil Todt (1810–1900) – born in Berlin, Germany

=== U V W ===
- Patricia Weeks (born 1938) – Alice Springs, Central Australia; born in Melbourne
- Jennifer Wilkinson (born 1947) – born in Tasmania

== See also ==
- Australian National Botanic Gardens
