= Yellow bells =

Yellow bells is a common name for several plants and can refer to:

- Fritillaria pudica (yellow fritillary), a herbaceous plant
- Tecoma stans (yellow trumpetbush), a shrub

== See also ==
- Yellow bell
- Yellow mountain bell
