= Yellow bell =

Yellow bell is a common name for several plants with yellow flowers and may refer to:

- Allamanda, genus of flowering plants in the dogbane family
- Fritillaria pudica, species of flowering sagebrush
- Tecoma stans, species of flowering perennial shrub in the trumpet vine family

== See also ==
- Yellow bells
- Yellow mountain bell
