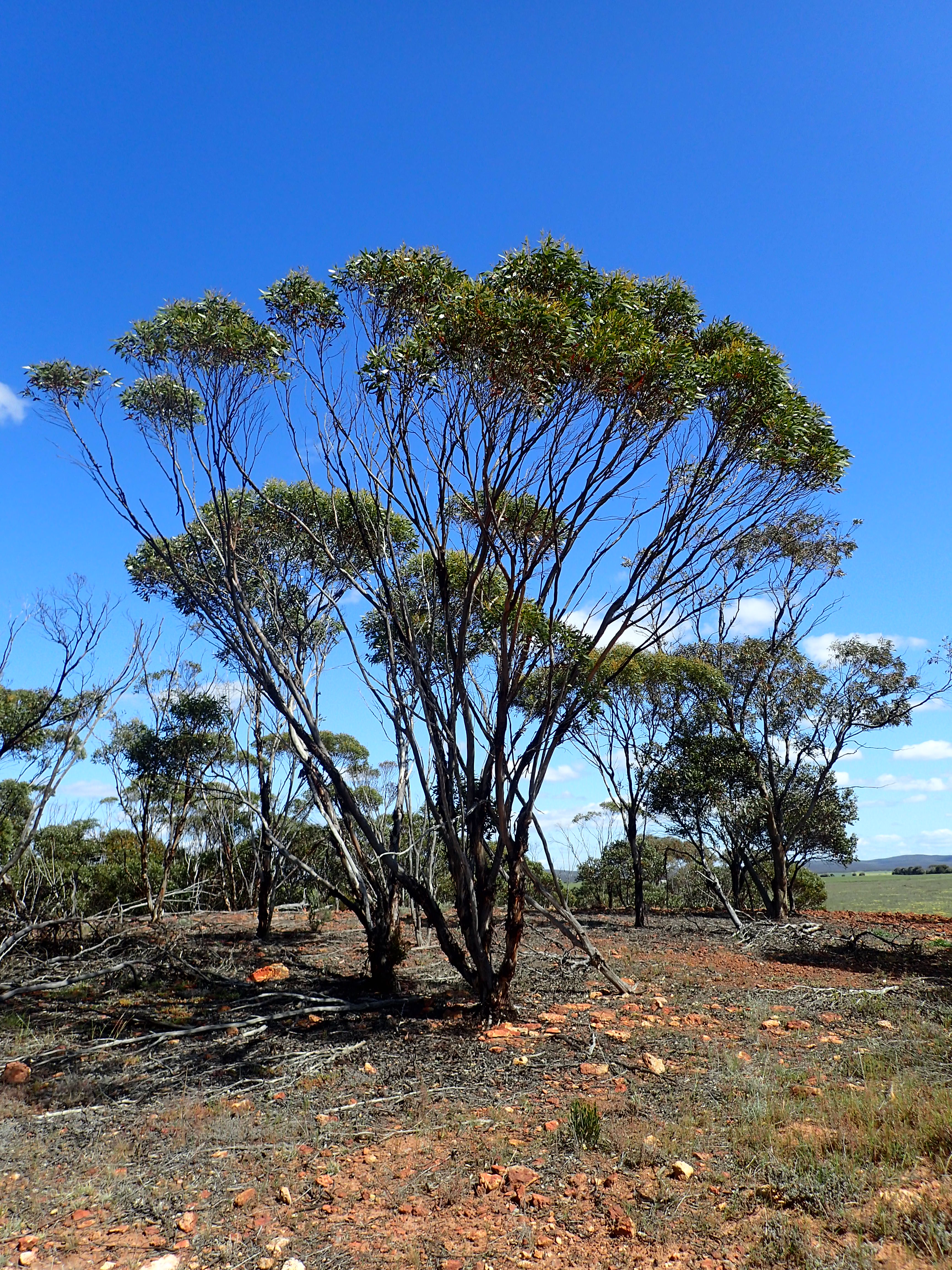
- Habit east of Ravensthorpe

Conservation status
- Endangered (IUCN 3.1)

Scientific classification
- Kingdom: Plantae
- Clade: Tracheophytes
- Clade: Angiosperms
- Clade: Eudicots
- Clade: Rosids
- Order: Myrtales
- Family: Myrtaceae
- Genus: Eucalyptus
- Species: E. neutra

Binomial name
- Eucalyptus neutra D.Nicolle

= Eucalyptus neutra =

Newdegate mallee

Species of eucalyptus

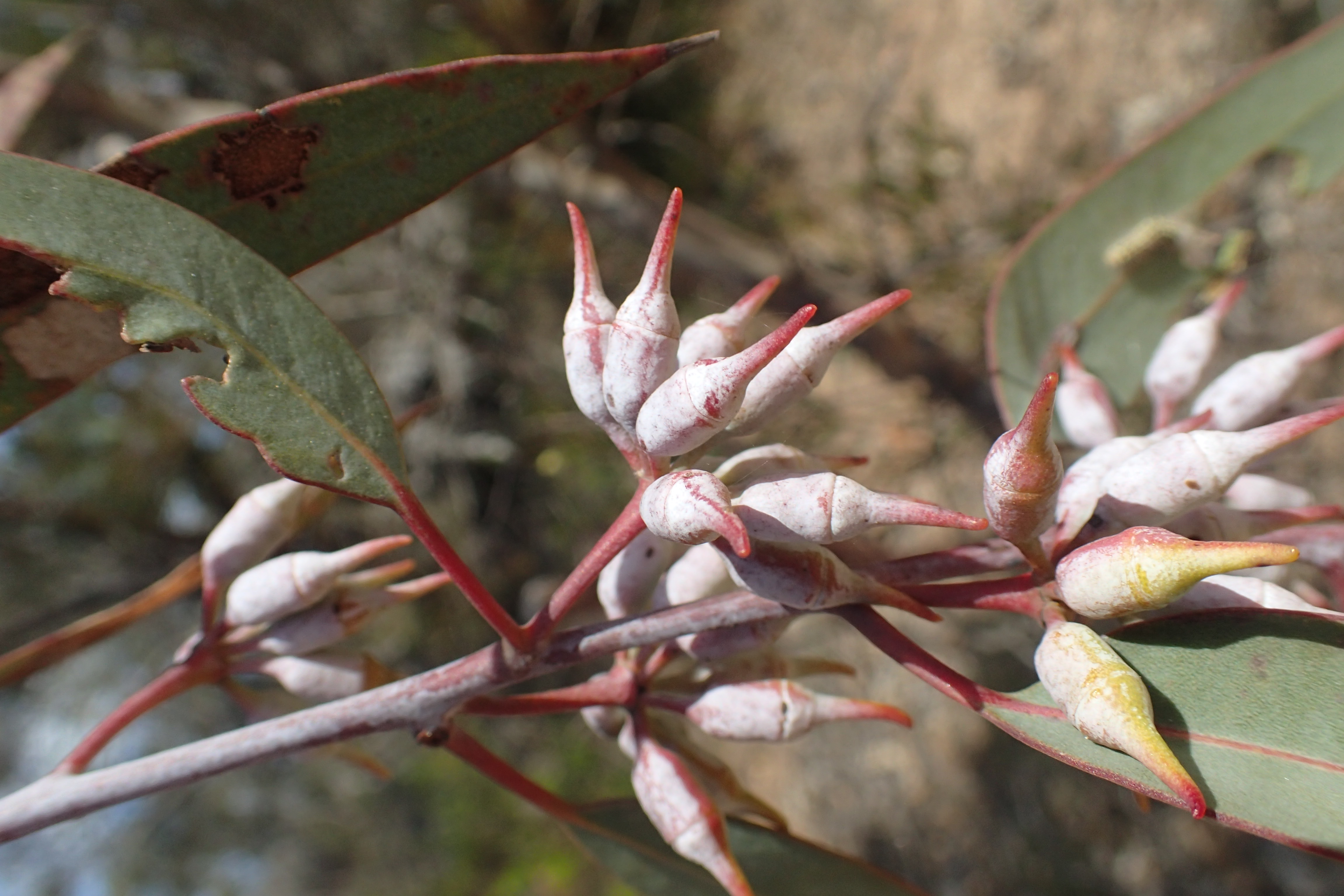
Flower buds

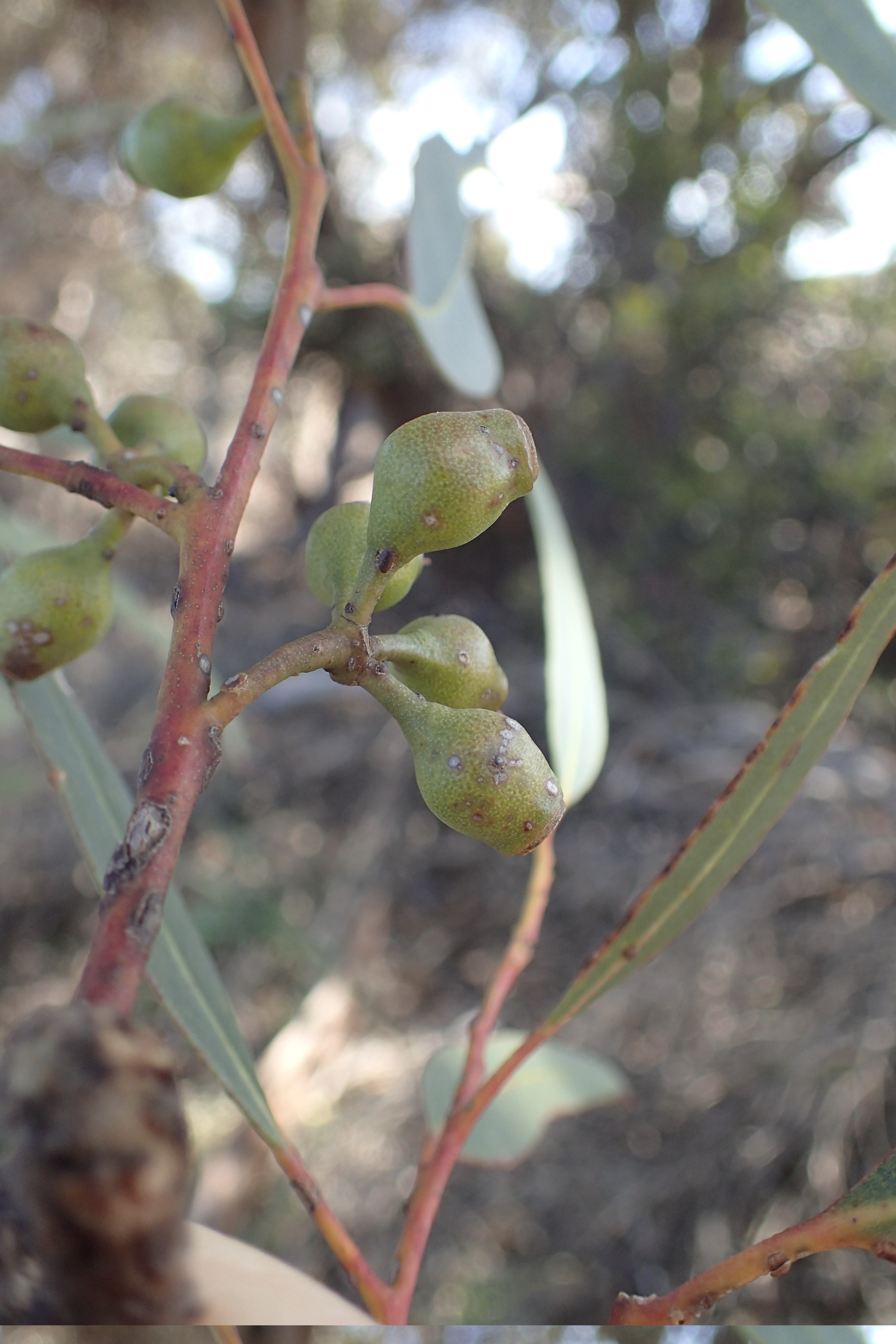
Fruit

Eucalyptus neutra, commonly known as the Newdegate mallee, is a species of mallee that is endemic to the south-west of Western Australia. It has greyish bark, lance-shaped adult leaves, flower buds usually in groups of seven, pale yellow to white flowers and barrel-shaped to shortened spherical fruit.

== Description ==
Eucalyptus neutra is a mallee that typically grows to a height of 4–6 m (13–20 ft) and forms a lignotuber. The bark is smooth cream-coloured to tan and peels in short strips to reveal salmon pink to copper-coloured new bark. Young plants and coppice regrowth have egg-shaped to lance-shaped leaves that are 35–80 mm (1.4–3.1 in) long and 18–40 mm (0.71–1.57 in) wide and glaucous. Adult leaves are arranged alternately, lance-shaped, the same shade of dull blish green on both sides, 50–110 mm (2.0–4.3 in) long and 10–20 mm (0.39–0.79 in) wide on a petiole 10–20 mm (0.39–0.79 in) long. The flower buds are arranged in leaf axils, usually in groups of seven, on an unbranched peduncle 5–13 mm (0.20–0.51 in) long, the individual buds on pedicels 3–6 mm (0.12–0.24 in) long. Mature buds are glaucous, oval, 11–17 mm (0.43–0.67 in) long and 3–6 mm (0.12–0.24 in) wide with a beaked to horn-shaped operculum. Flowering occurs on November and February and the flowers are pale yellow to white. The fruit is a woody, barrel-shaped to shortened spherical capsule 5–10 mm (0.20–0.39 in) long and 5–8 mm (0.20–0.31 in) wide with the valves protruding strongly above the rim.

== Taxonomy and naming ==
Eucalyptus neutra was first formally described in 1999 by Dean Nicolle in Australian Systematic Botany from specimens collected by Ian Brooker about 10 km (6.2 mi) east of Newdegate. The specific epithet (neutra) is a Latin word meaning "middle", referring to this species being in an intermediate position between E. flocktoniae and E. aff. transcontinentalis.

== Distribution and habitat ==
Newdegate mallee is found on plains and hillsides, between ridges and on road verges from near Lake King towards Corrigin and Jerramungup the Avon Wheatbelt, Coolgardie, Esperance Plains and Mallee biogeographic regions of Western Australia where it grows in gravelly sandy-clay-loam soils.

== Conservation status ==
This eucalypt is classified as "not threatened" by the Western Australian Government Department of Parks and Wildlife.

== See also ==
- List of Eucalyptus species
