= Vera Scarth-Johnson =

British born Australian botanist and botanical illustrator

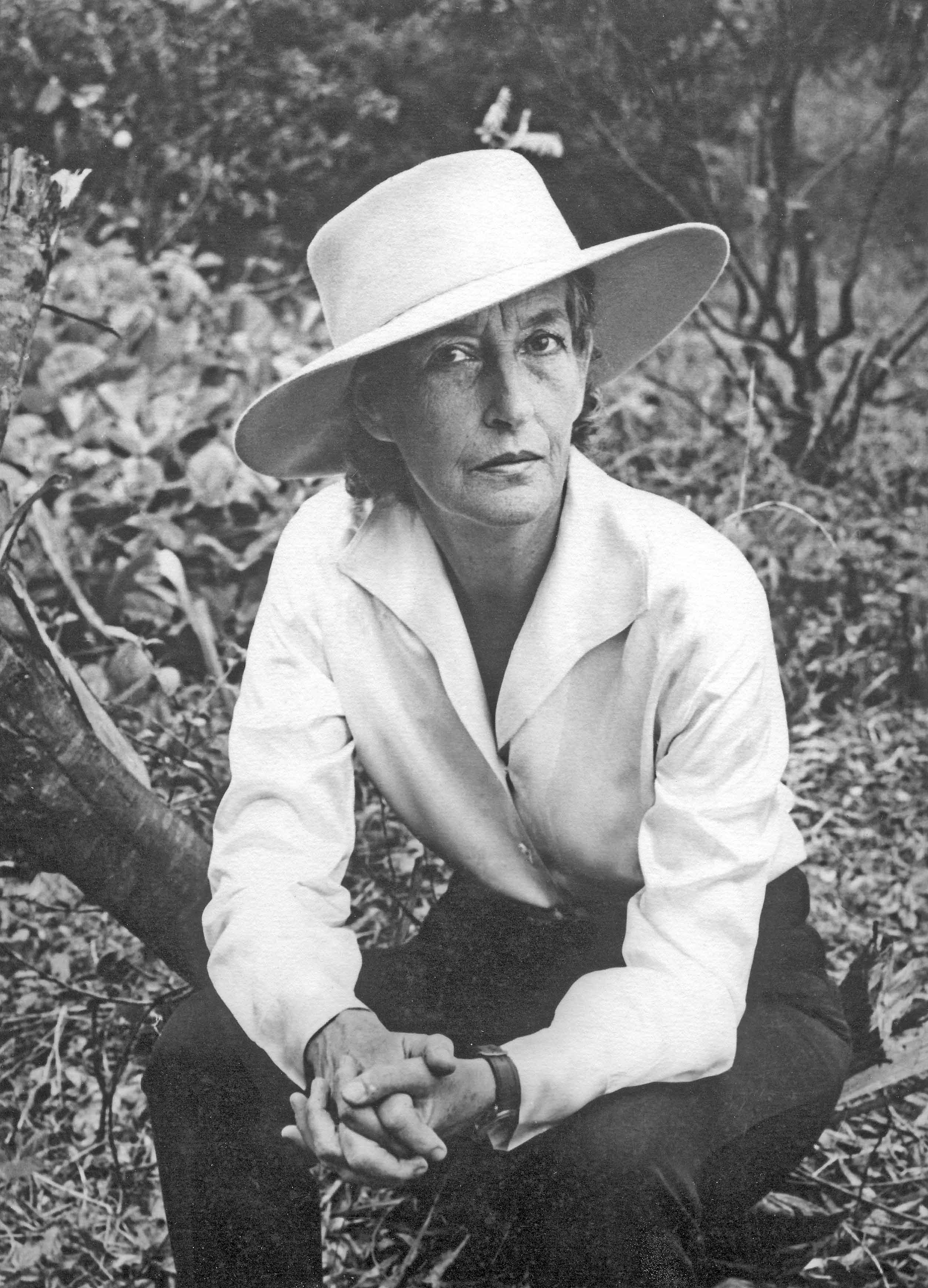
- Born: 1912; Morley
- Died: 19 May 1999
- Occupations: Botanical illustrator, botanist, botanical collector, scientific collector
- Awards: Medal of the Order of Australia (For service to art as a watercolour artist specialising in the native flora of Cooktown and the Endeavour River region of Queensland., Vera Elizabeth SCARTH-JOHNSON, 1996)

Vera Scarth-Johnson OAM (1912 – 19 May 1999) was a noted botanist and botanical illustrator who is also remembered for her continual efforts to teach others to treasure the flora and environment of Australia and, in particular, the botanically rich region of Cooktown and the Endeavour River Valley, on Cape York Peninsula, in far northern Queensland.

== Early life ==
Vera Scarth-Johnson was born in 1912 in Morley, near Leeds, Yorkshire, England. She attended school very near the birthplace of James Cook. She was sent to finishing school in Paris, where she found little of interest except the garden. An avid gardener from childhood she was always keen to pursue a career in horticulture. She studied art at both the Leeds College of Art and the St. Albans College of Art. She was keen to pursue a horticultural career but could not find an employer willing to take on a female apprentice. She worked for a Leeds market garden until her grandfather, a wealthy woollen manufacturer, by now resigned to her implacable choice of career, gave her two thousand pounds to start a piggery and market garden of her own.

== Life in Australia ==
In 1947 Vera emigrated to Australia, and after some time in Victoria moved north, settling in the Wide Bay district of Queensland, where she purchased a small property near Bundaberg. Initially she grew vegetables and tobacco but soon changed to sugar cane, being only the second woman to obtain a sugar assignment. Vera was no slouch when it came to being involved in the hard work of farming and had a fund of lively tales of her life as a cane farmer.

In the evenings, particularly in winter, when farm work was less demanding, Vera sketched and painted flowers. In the mid-1960s she heard a radio interview featuring the Director of the Kew Royal Botanic Gardens of England. He was discussing how poorly funded botany was, and how the Kew Gardens relied heavily on the voluntary assistance of collectors around the world. Vera wrote to him offering help and enclosed some of her drawings, so beginning her long association with herbaria at Kew.

Vera's collecting trips, all at personal expense took her travelling over much of Australia and around the Pacific Islands. Herbaria in Australia, in Europe and the North America benefited enormously from her research and passion. Entranced by the beauty of the Endeavour River valley, in 1972, at the age of 60 Vera settled in Cooktown and began collecting and recording native plants of the region. With Aboriginal friends from the local Guugu Yimithirr people, Vera made extensive trips locating species and recording information on their uses. Inspired by the early botanical work of Joseph Banks and Daniel Solander and Lieutenant (later Captain) James Cook's voyage of discovery, she set out to paint the plants of the area. To her great sorrow, the onset of Parkinson's disease meant she could only complete 160 works.

In 1990, Vera gave her collection of botanical illustrations to the people of Cooktown to enrich the public appreciation of the Endeavour River area. The collection is exhibited in the Nature's PowerHouse building which was inspired by her work, in the Cooktown Botanic Gardens.

Vera was an active campaigner against developments that could adversely affect what she called 'my river'. In the 1970s there was a proposal to establish a silica sand mine on the north shore of the Endeavour. The Endeavour River National Park was created after Vera alerted people to this threat. Additionally, she managed to obtain a grant of land over a lovely heathland area of about 93.5 hectares or 231 acres (0.93 km^{2}) as a wildlife reserve, about 17km southeast of Bundaberg. In 2006, Burnett Shire Council, formally named it "The Vera Scarth-Johnson Wildflower Reserve".

Vera died in May 1999 surrounded by loving friends and family.

== Legacy ==
Vera's wish was that the Nature's PowerHouse Interpretive Centre would educate both current and future generations about the wonders and the importance of the environment and the need to protect the few remaining pristine parts of the planet.

Vera was awarded a Medal of the Order of Australia (OAM) for her contribution to art and the environment in the Queen's Birthday Honours list in June 1996. A rare shrub, Argophyllum verae, commemorates her name.

The book of Vera's collection, entitled National Treasures, enhances Cooktown's international reputation and its contribution to botanical history and Australia's history. National Treasures includes 152 full-colour reproductions of Vera's illustrations, her notes on them, and other information.

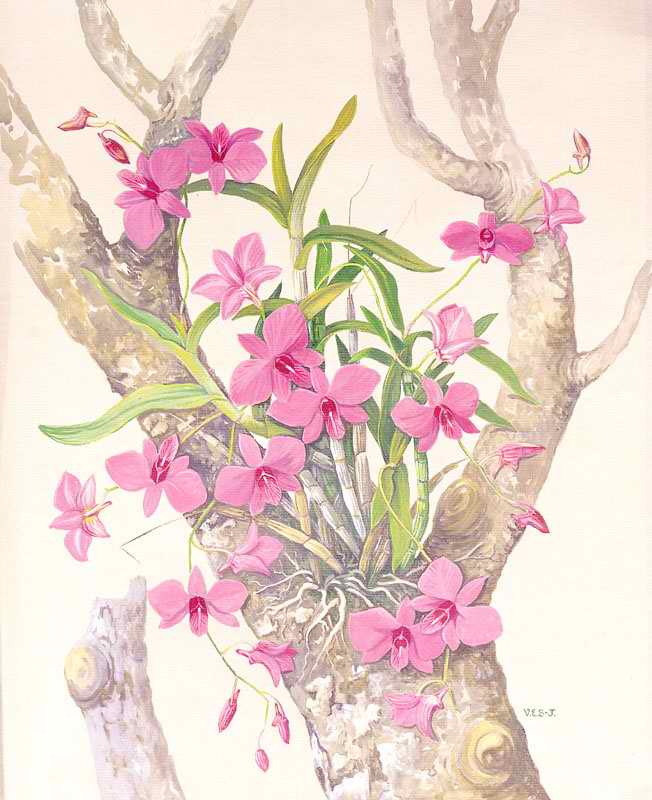
Cooktown Orchid (Vappodes phalaenopsis) by Vera Scarth-Johnson

== See also ==
- List of Australian botanical illustrators

== Publications ==
- Wildflowers of the Warm East Coast. Vera Scarth-Johnson. 1967. The Jacaranda Press, Brisbane.
- Wildflowers of New South Wales. Vera Scarth-Johnson. 1968. The Jacaranda Press, Brisbane.
- National Treasures: Flowering plants of Cooktown and Northern Australia. Vera Scarth-Johnson. 2000. Vera Scarth-Johnson Gallery Association Inc. ISBN 0-646-39726-5 (pbk); ISBN 0-646-39725-7 (Limited Edition – Leather Bound)

== Sources ==
1. Nature's PowerHouse.
2. Brilliant Careers: Women collectors and illustrators in Queensland. 1997. Compiled by Judith McKay. Section on Vera Scarth-Johnson by John Clarkson. Queensland Museum. ISBN 0-7242-7693-9
3. Cooktown Local News, Issue No.200, 20 May 1999
4. Australian National Botanic Gardens
