= Philippa Nikulinsky =

Australian botanical illustrator

Philippa Nikulinsky AM
- Born: 1942 (age 83–84); Kalgoorlie, Western Australia
- Known for: Botanical illustrator, author
- Website: nikulinsky.com.au

Philippa Mary Nikulinsky AM (born 1942) is an Australian artist and botanical illustrator based in Western Australia.

== Biography ==
Nikulinsky was born in Kalgoorlie in 1942, a remote region in central Western Australia. She began working as an illustrator of natural history in the mid-1970s, specialising in plants from harsh environments. Her illustrations have been included in many books and magazines. She is the author or coauthor of books on plants, animals, and their environment. Other works include the cover art for Landscope, scientific journals, and other publications.

Nikulinsky's career focuses on a lifetime fascination with the flora and fauna of the arid lands of Western Australia. For nearly 50 years, Nikulinsky has travelled throughout the state to record, draw and paint its phenomenal natural history. She has shared her skill for watercolour painting through teaching, exhibitions, commissioned works and publications.

Nikulinsky has made contributions to Flora of Australia. She is the author of a work on Banksia menziesii (Firewood Banksia), provided illustrations and text to Life on the Rocks (with Stephen Hopper), and a large format art book called Soul of the Desert. Many of her works include several organisms, illustrating the ecological relationships of the primary subject, and are noted for possessing high levels of detail while still maintaining a sense of spontaneity. As with other botanical illustrators, she works primarily in watercolour.

In 2011, Her Majesty, Queen Elizabeth II and the Duke of Edinburgh visited Perth for the meeting of Commonwealth Heads of Government (CHOGM). During the visit, the Premier of Western Australia presented the Queen with a gift of Nikulinsky's limited edition publication ‘Wildflowers of the Eastern Goldfields of Western Australia’ on behalf of the State government and the people of Western Australia.

Her latest collection of work, Cape Arid includes paintings by her husband Alex Nikulinsky and is held at the world-renowned COMO The Treasury Hotel in Perth. In 2016, Prince Charles opened the hotel and was presented with a work from the series.

On 26 January 2016 Nikulisnky was awarded Member (AM) in the general division of the Order of Australia, "for significant service to the visual arts as a botanical painter and illustrator, to professional associations, and as an author."

== Ceramics ==
From 1995 to 2005, Nikulinsky was commissioned to design and paint Australian plants and animals for use on dinnerware produced by Australian Fine China. These were sold throughout the world.

== Works ==
From 1990 to 2006, Nikulinsky painted the cover illustration of the quarterly magazine ‘Landscope’ for the Western Australian Department of Conservation and Land Management. In 2004 Philippa was commissioned to paint leschenaultia for the May 2004 edition of Curtis's Botanical Magazine published for Royal Botanic Gardens, Kew.

Nikulinsky has been praised for her work on Banksia menziesii, describing each stage of the reproductive cycle. The inflorescence of banksias is regarded as one of the most challenging subjects to depict. The brief text is accompanied by a series of extraordinary illustrations, both endpapers showing a seed of the species.

- Flowering Plants of the Eastern Goldfields of Western Australia: Goldfields of Western Australia. (1986) International Specialized Book Services. ISBN 978-0-9592644-0-1
- BANKSIA MENZIESII (1992) Philippa Nikulinsky. Fremantle Arts Centre Press. ISBN 978-1-86368-035-6.
- Life on the Rocks: The Art of Survival (1999) Philippa Nikulinsky and Stephen D. Hopper. Fremantle Arts Centre Press ISBN 978-1-86368-258-9.
- Wildflowers in Watercolour Philippa Nikulinsky. Fremantle Arts Centre Press (November 2000) ISBN 978-1-86368-320-3.
- 1999 Australian Wildflower Diary (2000). Philippa Nikulinsky. International Specialized Book Services. ISBN 978-1-86368-231-2.
- Soul of the Desert (2000) Philippa Nikulinsky and Stephen D. Hopper. Fremantle Arts Centre Press (October 2005). ISBN 978-1-921064-06-7
- Cape Arid (2012) Philippa and Alex Nikulinsky. Fremantle Press. ISBN 978-1-922089-00-7
- Firewood Banksia (2014) Philippa Nikulinsky. Fremantle Press. ISBN 978-1-922089-81-6
- Nikulinsky Unfolded: Xanthorrhoea (2019) Philippa Nikulinsky. Fremantle Press. ISBN 978-1-925816-25-9
- Philippa Nikulinsky: For the Seeker Who Walks (2026) Philippa Nikulinsky, Alex Nikulinsky and Angela Nikulinsky. Fremantle Press. ISBN 978-1-760996-85-7

== See also ==
- List of Australian botanical illustrators
