= Susan Fereday (botanical artist) =

Australian artist (1815–1878)

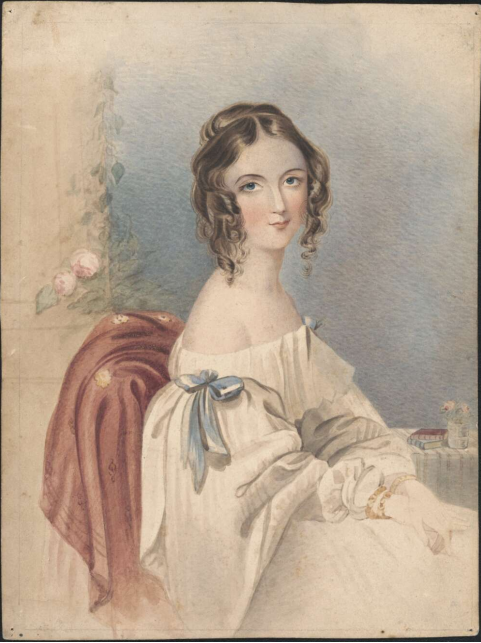
- Self-portrait of Susan Fereday, National Library of Australia
- Born: 1815; Leicestershire, England
- Died: 21 October 1878 (aged 62–63); Sale, Victoria, Australia
- Other names: Susan Georgina Marianne Apthorpe
- Known for: the study of algae and scientific illustration
- Spouse: Rev. John Fereday
- Children: Elizabeth Henty Fereday
- Scientific career
- Fields: algology and botany

Susan Fereday (née Apthorpe) (1815, Leicestershire, England – 21 October 1878, Sale, Victoria, Australia) was an algologist, botanical illustrator, artist and Sunday school teacher who made scientifically significant collections of botany specimens in Tasmania, Australia. She was also a talented artist known for her accurate paintings of the local flora of Tasmania.

== Life ==
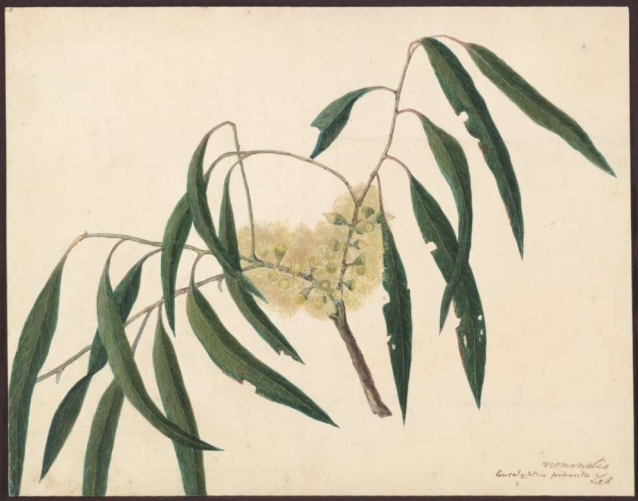
Eucalyptus viminalis by Susan Fereday

Fereday was born Susan Georgina Marianne Apthorpe in Leicestershire, England in 1815, to Freder Apthorp and Susan Athorp, née Hubbard. She married John Fereday in London on 29 December 1836 and emigrated with her husband to Australia aboard the Aden on 5 November 1845. The couple arrived at what was then Van Diemen's Land on 26 February 1846. Fereday lived in "The Grove" in George Town, Tasmania and used the local flora as inspiration for her paintings. Fereday exhibited her art at the Melbourne Intercolonial Exhibition of 1866-1867. She was part of the Tasmanian contingent of this exhibition alongside fellow botanical artist Louisa Anne Meredith.

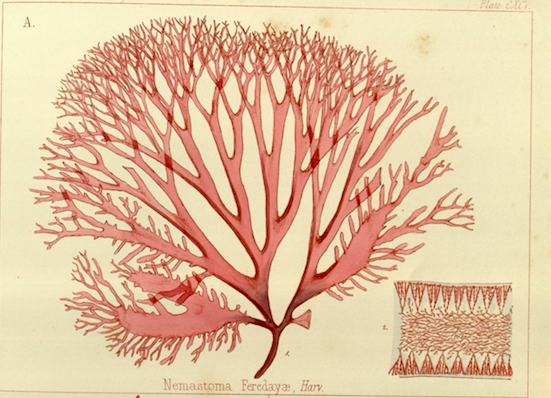
Nemastoma feredayae by William Henry Harvey

Fereday was also a keen collector of algae specimens and established a scientifically significant collection. William Henry Harvey named two species after Fereday to honour her contribution to the study of algae, Dasya feredayae and Nemastoma feredayae.

Fereday Place in the Canberra suburb of Conder is named in her honour.

== Family ==
Fereday married her husband the Reverend John Fereday in 1837 and had six children with him. She moved to Sale, Victoria to live with her daughter and son-in-law after John's death in 1871.

== Works ==
Sketchbook 1831-1834, Germany, Italy etc, National Library of Australia

[Sketchbook] / [Susan Fereday], National Library of Australia

Scrap book and sketches, National Library of Australia

== See also ==
List of Australian botanical illustrators
