= Margaret Flockton =

Anglo-Australian artist and botanical illustrator

- Born: 29 September 1861; Sussex
- Died: 12 August 1953 (aged 91); Sydney
- Education: South Kensington Schools
- Known for: Botanical art
- Notable work: The Forest Flora of New South Wales

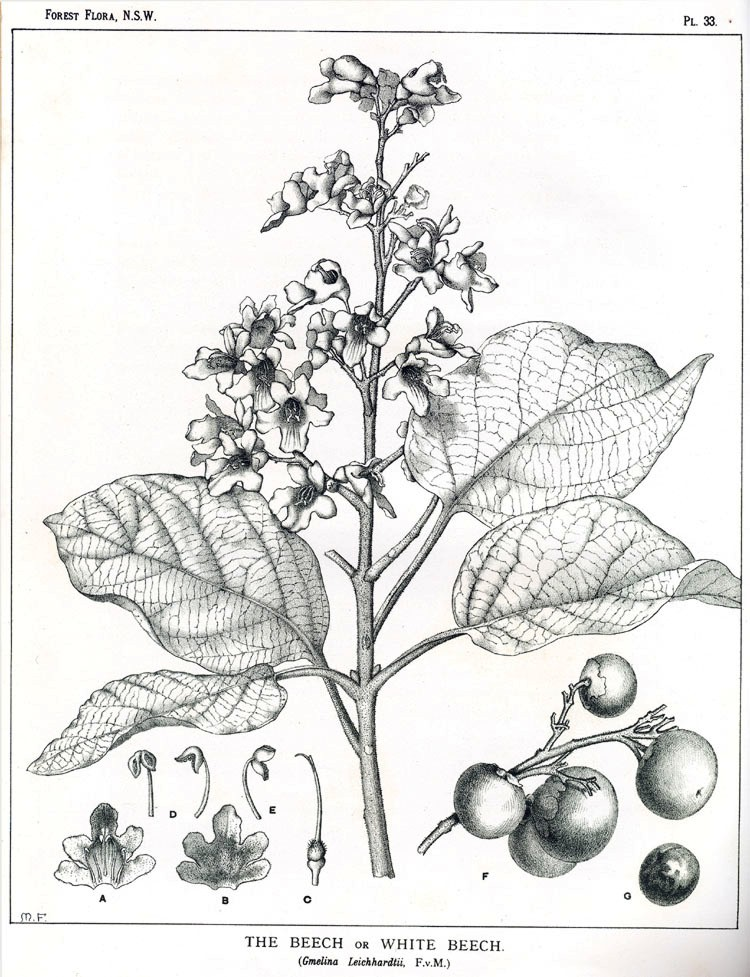
Gmelina leichhardtii Plate 33 from Forest Flora of New South Wales

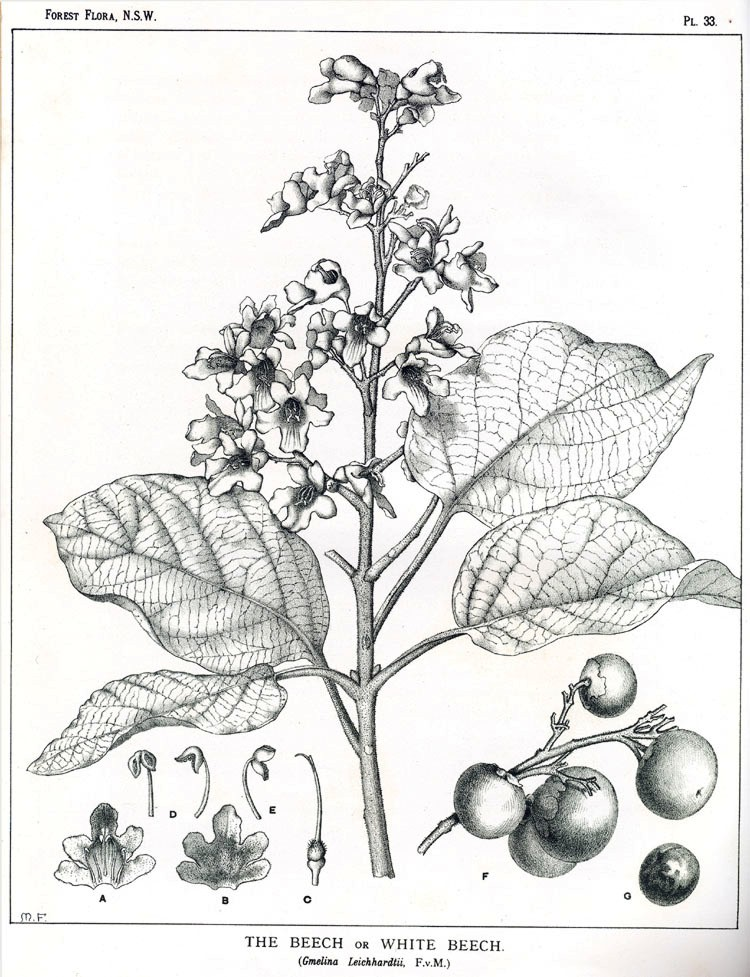
Gmelina leichhardtiiPlate 33 from Forest Flora of New South Wales

Margaret Lilian Flockton (29 September 1861 Sussex – 12 August 1953 Sydney), is most commonly recognized as a botanical artist famous for her botanical illustrations of "The Forest Flora of New South Wales" (some 300 plates), "A Critical Revision of the Genus Eucalyptus", and the genus Opuntia, all by the botanist and forester, Joseph Henry Maiden. She was also a painter, commercial artist, and art teacher at different points of her life. She was the first botanical illustrator at the Royal Botanic Gardens in Sydney. She was also the first female lithographer in Australia which gave her a high reputation at the time.

== Early life ==
Margaret Flockton was born on September 25, 1861, into a well-to-do family in Leyton, England. However, at the age of four her father abandoned a job with a stable income to pursue his passion as an artist. As a result, her family began to struggle. Flockton admired her father's decision regardless of the price and said that it was around this time that she began to take up drawing on her own.

By the time Flockton turned ten her family was impoverished. As a result, they relocated to a cheaper area to live in South Wales. Here, Flockton attended the Cardiff Science and Art school. The school was a branch of the South Kensington National Art Training School and was established by the British government. The teachers at who taught at the school were all graduates from the South Kensington schools and classes in drawing, sculpture, painting, engraving, and lithography.

Flockton was also a student at the Miss Gann's Life School which was also a branch of the South Kensington schools. It was here that Flockton was recognized for her artistic abilities and was sent off to the and art department's principle school to finish off her studies in London and receive an art teaching certificate in 1885.

Shortly after, Margaret and her family received an immigration opportunity and moved to Sydney, Australia in 1888. The family settled here and never returned to London. In Sydney, Flockton went through another decade of training and became the most thoroughly trained female artist living there at the time.

== Early career ==
After Flockton's training was completed, she quickly found work as a lithographer in Sydney with printers and publishers Gibbs Shallard & Co. and S.T. Leigh. She continued her work as a commercial artist for publishers for seven years. During this time in 1892, she was also took up painting from nature and teaching art. To teach, Flockton opened up a studio in Victoria Chambers, Castlereagh Street in Sydney.

In the early 1900s, Flockton started to engage more in commercial art. Twelve of her lithographs depicting Australian wild flowers were used to promote the smoking of cigarettes as part of an intensive add campaign. Her lithographs quickly became popular and were further publicized through the printing of her lithographs as postcards. Unfortunately, Flockton never received the recognition she deserved for her work. Though she included her signature in all of her lithographs, companies who profited off of her work did not include it. Therefore, her work was extremely popular but her name did not popularize with it.

== Royal Art Society ==
Flockton became a member of the Royal Art Society of NSW where she exhibited her watercolors and oil paintings from 1894 to 1901 alongside Sidney Long, Arthur Streeton, Tom Roberts, and other noteworthy artists. During this time, she exhibited 39 of her watercolor paintings which consisted of various studies and still-lifes.

In 1895, Flockton exhibited six watercolors, calling them "Australian WildFlowers". One depicts the state's official floral emblem, the Waratah, and was bought by the NSW Royal Art Gallery. Another one of her watercolor paintings was selected to be included in an Album for Queen Victoria's Diamond Jubilee. A painting of two dead parrots done by Flockton was also included in the Australian Federation Album presented to the Duke and Duchess of York in 1901. This was her last year of painting for the Royal Art Gallery.

Near the time of her recognition, Joseph Maiden, the director of the botanic gardens, was founding the National Herbarium of New South Wales. He was determined to make it a successful institution that collected, identified, documented, and stored both Australian and exotic plant life. After learning of Flockton from her watercolor Watarah, Maiden invited her to work for him at the Herbarium in 1901. It was then that Flockton decided to give up painting and instead pursue a professional career as a scientific botanical artist for the Sydney Botanic Gardens.

== Royal Botanic Gardens, Sydney ==
Flockton started work at the National Herbarium of the Royal Botanic Gardens, Sydney on 3 June 1901 at the rate of "2 shillings per hour" and was earning £330 per annum at her retirement in 1927.There are some 1000 of her illustrations in The Botanic Gardens Trust Archive.

At that time Joseph Maiden, Director of the Botanic Gardens and Government Botanist, was greatly impressed by the standard of her work. He considered her "the most accomplished botanical artist in New South Wales", and invited her to produce the illustrations for "A Critical Revision of the Genus Eucalyptus", which he was writing. By the time the project was complete, Flockton had produced 308 detailed images. Each drawing showed up to 45 different leaves, stems, buds, flowers, seed pods, and seeds. Some of these images were even shown from different angles. They were neatly and pleasingly organized on the pages thanks to Flockton's heavy training in design and drawing. After the illustrations were finished, Flockton would translate each one of them into lithographs ready for printing.To produce lithographs, it is thought that Flockton drew them directly onto metal plates referencing tracings from original watercolors. These lithographs show a great deal of hatching and crosshatching.

Maiden's second project, the Forest Flora, contained 295 images. 235 were done by Flockton. The remaining 60 were done under her supervision by E.A. King. These publications are still studied by students in Botany to a large extent. The University of Sydney has published the entirety of these works in the electronic book section of their library complete with Flockton's illustrations. This way they can be accessed both by students and the general public.

Flockton spent 12 1/2 hours a week working at the Botanic Gardens and 25 hours at the Forestry Department. In the end Flockton stayed on at the Botanic Gardens for five years beyond her retirement age, her last day of work at the Gardens being on 24 March 1927. In recognition of her contributions to botanical art, and referring to her as joint author of his works, Maiden named a few species after her - Eucalyptus flocktoniae, Acacia flocktoniae and the Dorrigo Daisy-bush Olearia flocktoniae.

== Producing illustrations ==
Flockton was very meticulous with her work. She used a magnifying glass to create illustrations of the finest detail. She is often pictured with a magnifying glass hanging around her waist. She drew, painted, and printed work in the gardens. Her work is recognizable for her highly meticulous observation, perfect accuracy, and simple yet elegant pencil and brush strokes. Many of her drawings survived but there are only a few of her colored works that remain today which are held in the Botanical Gardens in Sydney.

== Publications ==
Flockton published various books of her own during her lifetime such as a small volume "Lichens" and "Australian Wildflowers" (1908) illustrated with her coloured lithographs. She also produced the wildflower borders for butterfly studies in "Scenic Gems of Australia" by Dr Riches. Much later in life she wrote and illustrated "Children's Stories - Little Stories of Little People", describing the life-history of plants and insects, but which remained unpublished.

== Private life ==
Margaret lived with her parents for most of her life. She was always close with family, especially her sisters. She remained unmarried her entire life and never had children of her own. However, she was like a mother to her nieces and nephews, especially after her father's death in 1901 when the household became three-generational. Although underpaid compared with her male colleagues, Flockton managed to buy a private cottage 'Tulagi' at Tennyson, where she lived after her mother's death in 1917 and remained until her own death in 1953.

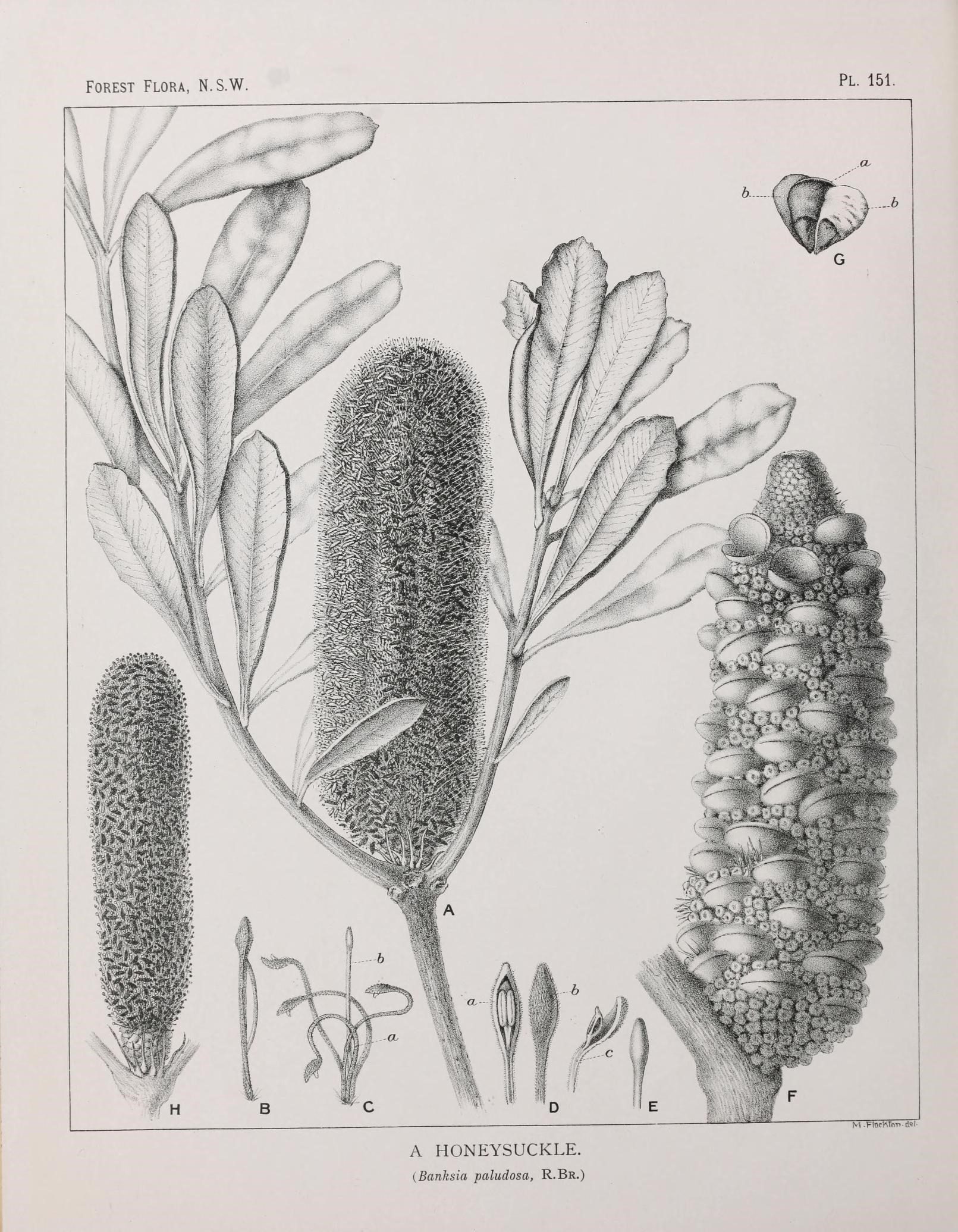
Illustration of Banksia paludosa (plate 151) from The Forest Flora of New South Wales (1913) by Joseph Maiden and Margaret Flockton.

== Death and legacy ==
Flockton died on August 12, 1953, shortly before her 92nd birthday. Although she was well known in her day, after her death, Flockton was largely forgotten for nearly half of a century. This was largely due to her work being closed off to the general public and only accessible within small scientific circles.

In 2003, she was rediscovered by two botanical artists at Sydney's Royal Botanical Gardens named Catherine Wardrop and Lesley Elkan. They gave a speech about Flockton and her cause at an International Women's Day lunch. Their speech led to the establishment of an award for scientific botanical illustrations in her honor in 2004. A couple of years later, her award began attracting entries worldwide.

The Margaret Flockton Art Award, now the Margaret Flockton Award, with two prizes of A$5000 and A$2000 are awarded annually for excellence in botanical illustration.[7][8]

This commemorates the contributions she made to botanical illustrations in Australia. Flockton Place in the Canberra suburb of Chisholm is named in her honour.[9]

== A Fragrant Memory ==
A biography of Margaret Flockton was released in 2016. It was written by her great great niece Louise Wilson who began working on it in 2004. To learn about her 'Aunt Mog', Wilson began taking private trips to Sydney and London. Her work was dependent upon stories from family and friends about her aunt that she was told on these trips. From the stories Wilson gathered in the biography she created, Flockton is presented as a brilliant, talented, yet reclusive woman.

== See also ==
- List of Australian botanical illustrators
