= University of Melbourne Herbarium =

Herbarium in Victoria, Australia

The University of Melbourne Herbarium
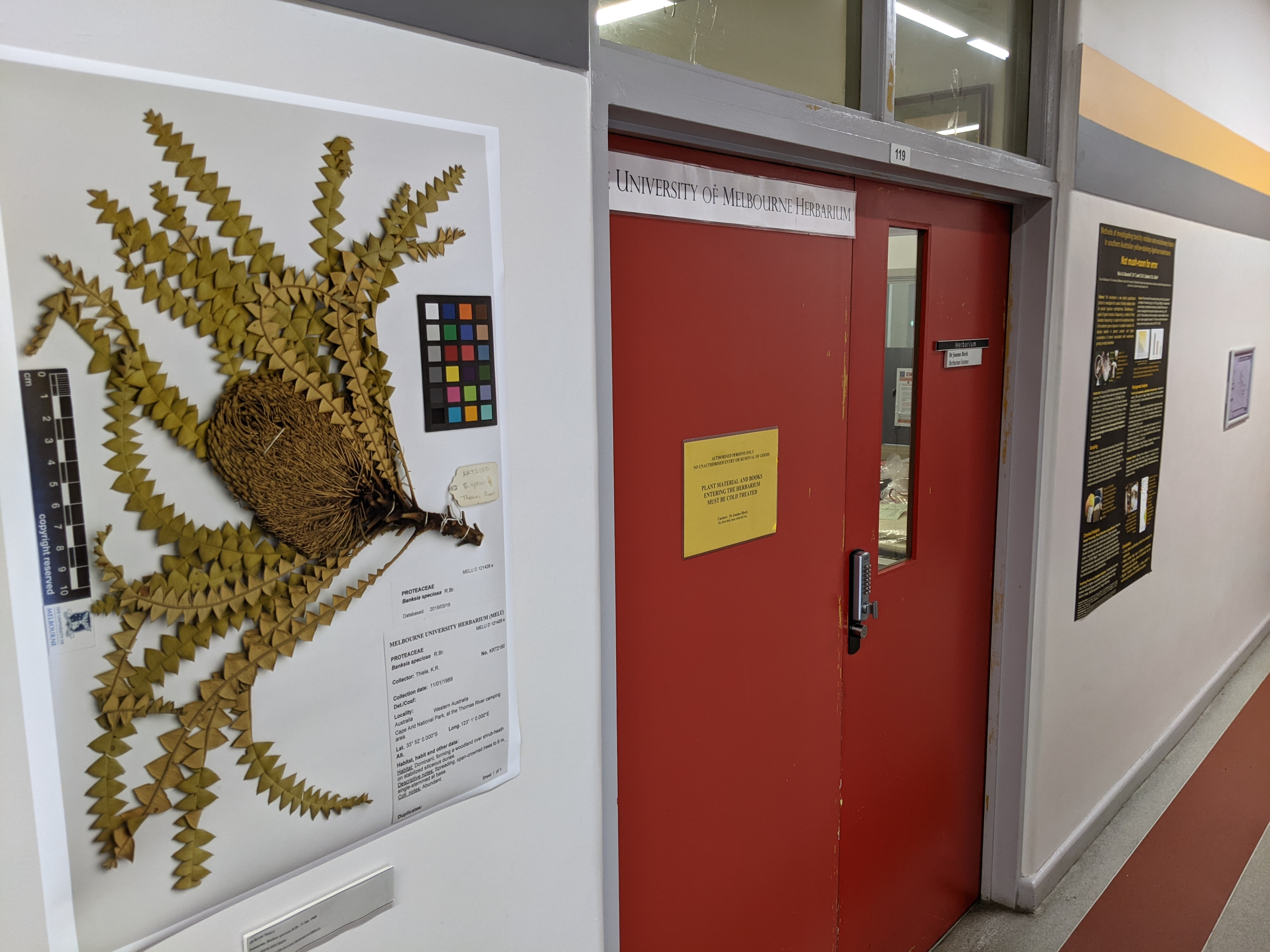
- Established: 1926
- Address: Room 119, BioSciences 3 (Old Natural Philosophy Building) The University of Melbourne
- Location: Parkville, Victoria, Australia
- Coordinates: 37°47′50″S 144°57′36″E
- Interactive map of The University of Melbourne Herbarium
- Website: The University of Melbourne Herbarium

The University of Melbourne Herbarium is a teaching and research herbarium within the School of Biosciences, University of Melbourne in Parkville, Victoria, Australia. Its Index Herbariorum code is MELU.

The University of Melbourne Herbarium is the largest university herbarium collection in Australia, with approximately 150,000 specimens, including 3,500 fungal specimens, and over 150 type specimens.

== History of the Herbarium ==
Under the auspices of Professor Frederick McCoy, the first herbarium kept on the university's grounds was the National Herbarium of Victoria, from 1856 until a dedicated herbarium building was constructed in 1860 close to the present-day location of the herbarium and the Royal Botanic Gardens Victoria.

Although it is generally acknowledged that there was a small preserved plant collection already on campus, the university's herbarium was officially established in 1926. Reverend Montague Rupp offered the non-orchid portion of his personal herbarium, of approximately 5,000 specimens, to his alma mater Trinity College. The specimens were ultimately sent to the botany department, and wooden cupboards were custom-built to house the new, and significant collection. In 1974, the herbarium was listed in the Index Herbariorum, and in 2014 it became a data provider with the Atlas of Living Australia.

== Significant collections ==
Significant collections held by MELU include:

- The Ex Burnley Horticultural College Herbarium, with 7,000 specimens that were originally used for teaching and research at Horticultural College. Donated to MELU in 2007.
- Tilden's South Pacific Plants Collection, collected by Josephine E. Tilden (1869–1957) and her students.
- The Wilsons Promontory Virtual Herbarium.
- An algae collection established by Sophie Charlotte Ducker (1909–2004), including specimens collected in Madagascar and the Mascarene Islands.
- Watercolors of Victorian Fungi by Malcolm Howie (1900–1936).
- Collections from Mount Buffalo National Park, made by Percy St John (1872–1944). They were relocated to MELU from Parks Victoria in 2006. Further collections to sample the present-day biodiversity of Mount Buffalo have also been made, and the 226 species of plants that now comprise the Mt Buffalo Miegunyah Collection.
- Slides, illustrations and specimens of microfungi from Haring Johannes Swart (1922–1993).
- The Victorian School of Forestry Herbarium, of approximately 5,500 specimens, that were collected between 1877 and 1992 by staff and students at the school. It relocated to MELU in August 2019.
