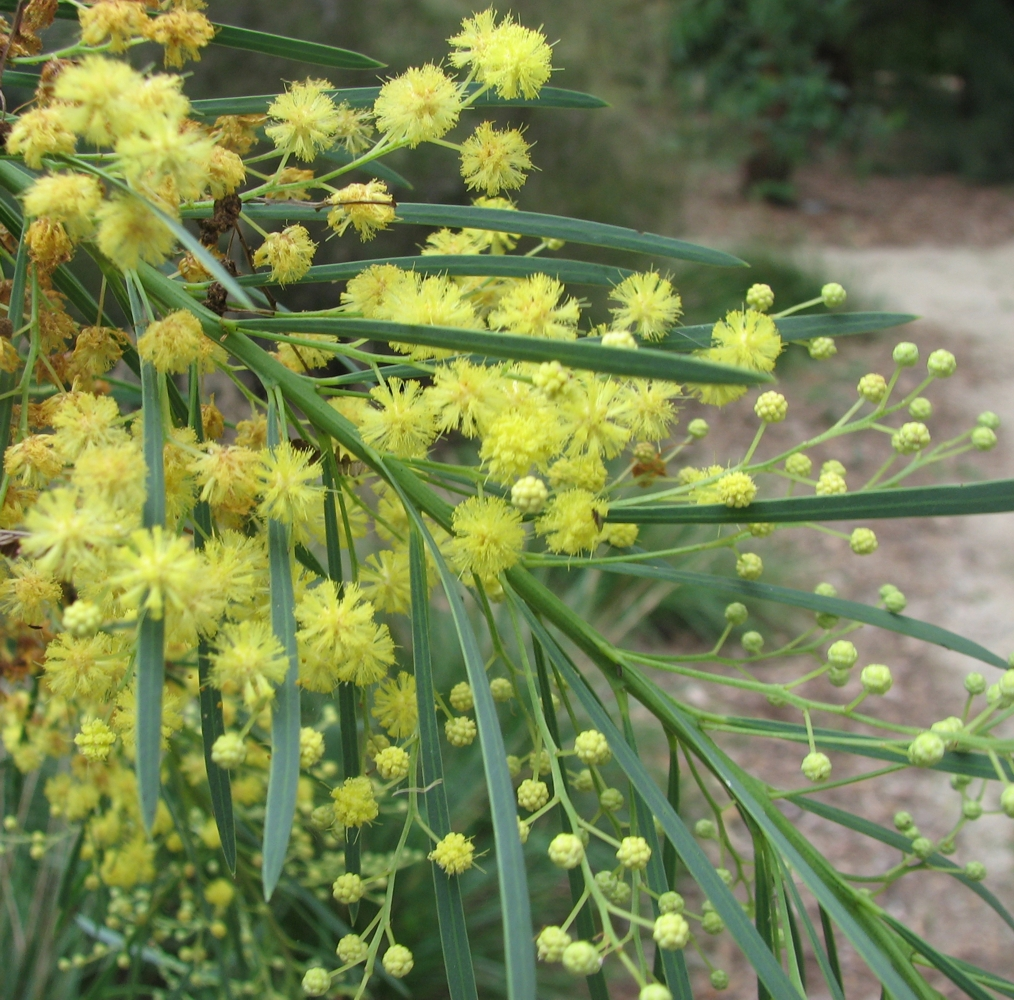
- In Maranoa Gardens

Conservation status
- Vulnerable (EPBC Act)

Scientific classification
- Kingdom: Plantae
- Clade: Tracheophytes
- Clade: Angiosperms
- Clade: Eudicots
- Clade: Rosids
- Order: Fabales
- Family: Fabaceae
- Subfamily: Caesalpinioideae
- Clade: Mimosoid clade
- Genus: Acacia
- Species: A. flocktoniae

Binomial name
- Acacia flocktoniae Maiden synonyms_ref =
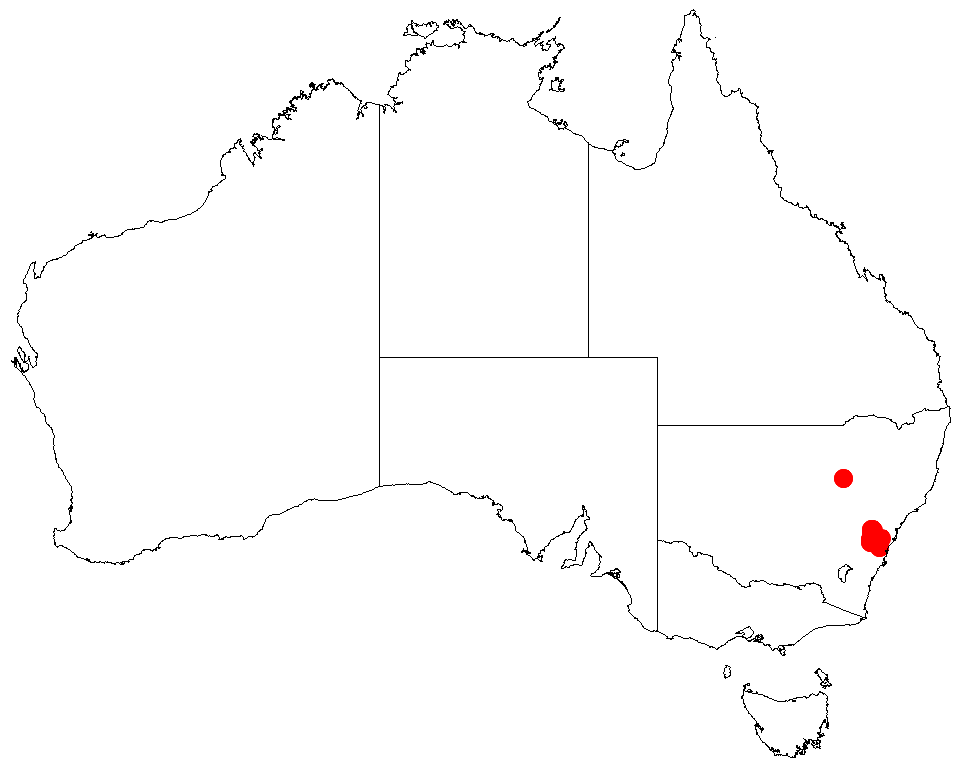
- Occurrence data from AVH

Synonyms
- Acacia lunata var. crassiuscula Maiden & Betche ex Maiden; Racosperma flocktoniae (Maiden) Pedley

= Acacia flocktoniae =

Species of legume

Acacia flocktoniae, commonly known as Flockton wattle, is a species of flowering plant in the family Fabaceae and is endemic to New South Wales, Australia. It is a sparingly branched, erect or spreading shrub with pendulous, reddish brown, glabrous branchlets, linear to narrowly lance-shaped phyllodes with the narrower end towards the base, spherical heads of creamy-white or bright yellow flowers and broadly linear, firmly papery to thinly leathery leathery pods.

== Description ==
Acacia flocktoniae is a sparingly branched, weak, erect or spreading shrub that typically grows to a height of 2–4 m (6 ft 7 in – 13 ft 1 in) and has somewhat pendulous, glabrous, reddish brown branchlets. Its phyllodes are rather crowded, ascending to erect, linear to narrowly lance-shaped with the narrower end towards the base, 50–90 mm (2.0–3.5 in) long and 2–5 mm (0.079–0.197 in) wide. There is a fine midrib and a gland up to 6 mm (0.24 in) above the base of the phyllode. The flowers are borne in spherical heads in racemes 20–60 mm (0.79–2.36 in) long on peduncles 3–5 mm (0.12–0.20 in) long, increasing to 8 mm (0.31 in) long in the fruiting stage. Each head has 20 to 30 densely arranged creamy white or bright yellow flowers. Flowering usually occurs from June to September, but has also been recorded in other months. The pods are broadly linear, straight to slightly curved, 40–110 mm (1.6–4.3 in) long and 5–7 mm (0.20–0.28 in) wide, firmly papery to thinly leathery and glabrous. The seeds are oblong, 4.5–5.5 mm (0.18–0.22 in) long a slightly shiny black with a club-shaped aril.

== Taxonomy ==
Acacia flocktoniae was first formally described in 1916 by Joseph Maiden in the Journal and Proceedings of the Royal Society of New South Wales from specimens collected at Byrnes' Gap at Yerranderie by Richard Cambage in 1909. The specific epithet (flocktoniae) honours Margaret Flockton.

== Distribution and habitat ==
Flockton wattle occurs on sandstone in dry sclerophyll forest in the western Blue Mountains from the Kanimbla Valley to near Yerranderie with a presumed extinct record from near Yarramundi in New South Wales.

== Conservation status ==
Eucalyptus flocktoniae is listed as "vulnerable" under the Australian Government Environment Protection and Biodiversity Conservation Act 1999 and the New South Wales Government Biodiversity Conservation Act 2016.
