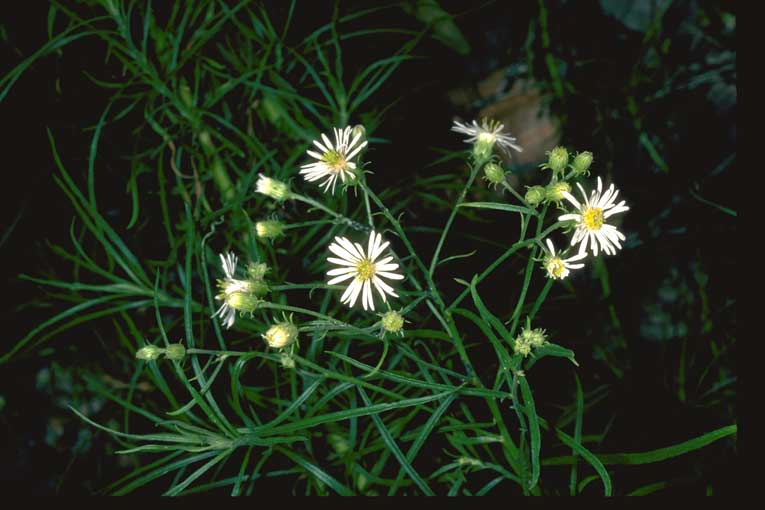
- In Jervis Bay Botanic Gardens

Conservation status
- Endangered (EPBC Act)

Scientific classification
- Kingdom: Plantae
- Clade: Tracheophytes
- Clade: Angiosperms
- Clade: Eudicots
- Clade: Asterids
- Order: Asterales
- Family: Asteraceae
- Genus: Linealia; G.L.Nesom
- Species: L. flocktoniae

Binomial name
- Linealia flocktoniae (Maiden & Betche) G.L.Nesom

Synonyms
- Olearia flocktoniae Maiden & Betche

= Linealia =

Species of flowering plants

Linealia flocktoniae, commonly known as Dorrigo daisy bush, is a species of flowering plant in the family Asteraceae and is endemic to a restricted area of New South Wales. It is a shrub with crowded, linear leaves, and white and yellow, daisy-like inflorescences.

== Description ==
Linealia flocktoniae is a short-lived shrub that typically grows to a height of up to 1–2.5 m (3 ft 3 in – 8 ft 2 in). Its leaves are arranged alternately along the branchlets, crowded, soft and linear, 20–90 mm (0.79–3.54 in) long, 1–5 mm (0.039–0.197 in) wide and more or less sessile. The edges of the leaves are rolled under and both surfaces are covered with soft hairs. The heads or daisy-like "flowers" are arranged in corymbs near the ends of branchlets and are 19–25 mm (0.75–0.98 in) in diameter on a peduncle up to 52 mm (2.0 in) long. Each head has 30 to 48 white ray florets, often tinged with violet, surrounding 39 to 49 yellow disc florets. Flowering occurs in February and March and the fruit is a silky-hairy achene, the pappus with 36 to 47 bristles.

== Taxonomy ==
Olearia flocktoniae was first formally described in 1909 by Joseph Maiden and Ernst Betche from specimens collected by John Luke Boorman from near Dorrigo in the same year. The specific epithet (flocktoniae) honours Margaret Flockton. In 2002 Cross et al. showed that Olearia as then described was polyphyletic, and in 2020 Guy L. Nesom described the new monotypic genus Linealia to contain the species.

== Distribution and habitat ==
Dorrigo daisy bush grows in disturbed sites in wet forest and rainforest on the northern edge of the Dorrigo Plateau in northern New South Wales.

== Conservation status ==
Linealia flocktoniae (as Olearia flocktoniae) is listed as "endangered" under the Australian Government Environment Protection and Biodiversity Conservation Act 1999 and the New South Wales Government Biodiversity Conservation Act 2016. The main threats to the species include habitat change, vehicle damage, and road maintenance.
