= Malcolm Ian Howie =

Australian watercolour artist and Methodist lay preacher

- Born: 26 March 1900; Creswick, Victoria, Australia
- Died: 21 January 1936 (aged 35); Frankston, Victoria, Australia

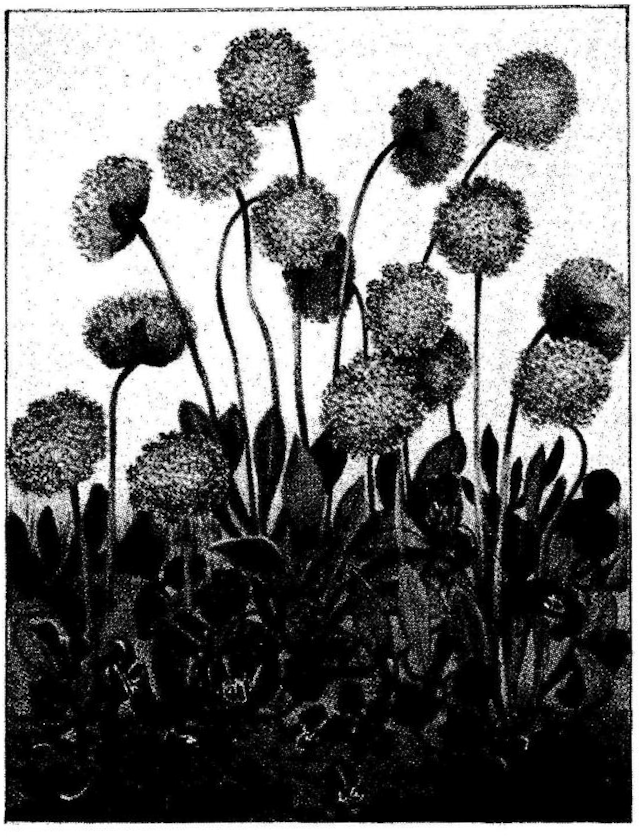
Example of an illustration by Howie, featuring blue pincushions (Brunonia australis) and running postman (Kennedia prostrata). Originally painted for, and published by the Weekly Times in 1934.

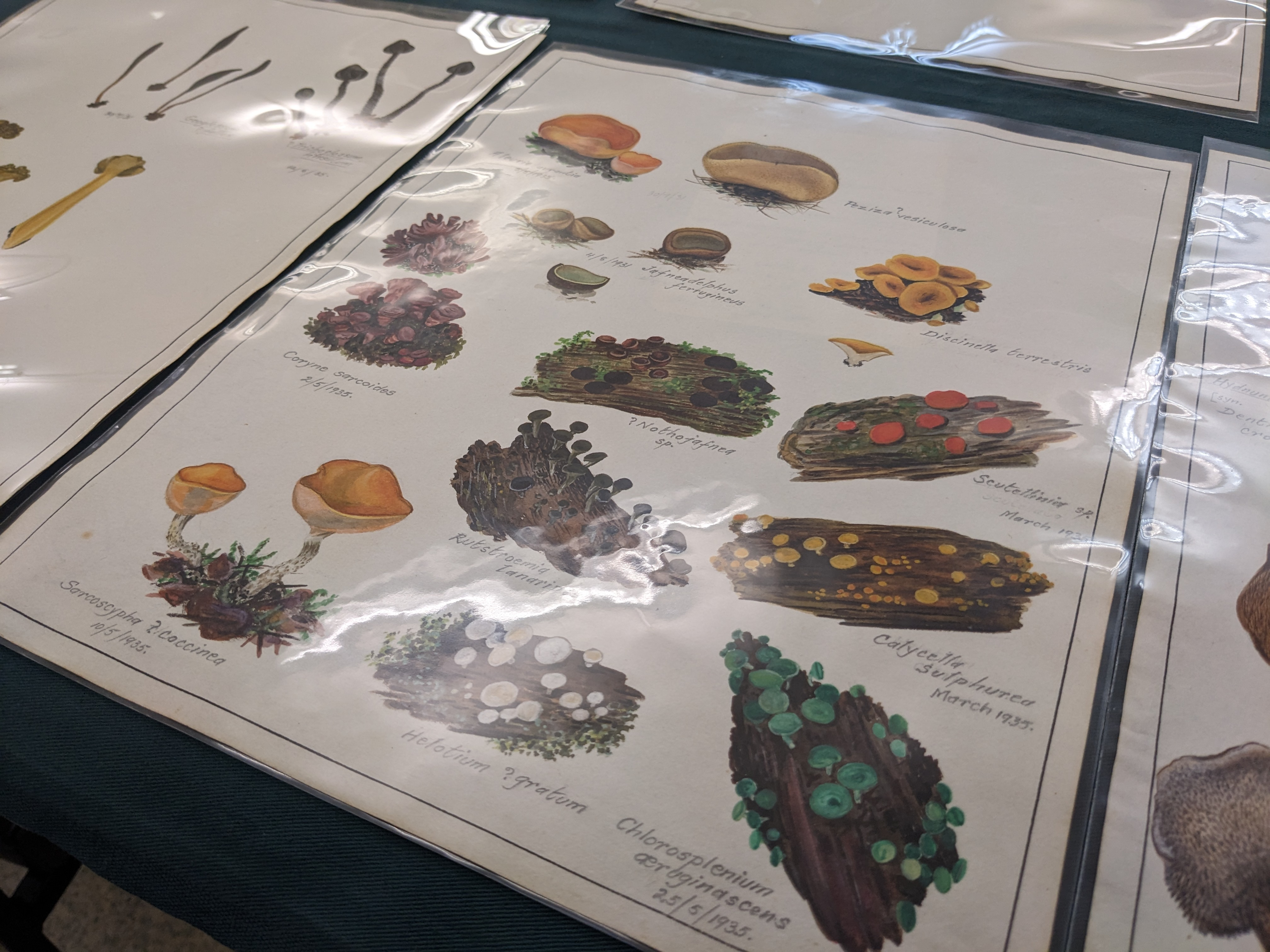
Example of artwork painted by Malcolm Howie, held by the State Botanical Collection, Royal Botanic Gardens Victoria.

Malcolm Ian Howie (1900–1936) was an Australian self-taught commercial and botanical watercolour artist and Methodist local preacher.

== Life ==
From the age of 16, Howie was unable to walk due to Spinal muscular atrophy. He was often accompanied on his preaching engagements by the botanist James Hamlyn Willis, who had married Malcolm's sister, Mavis Eileen Howie. An accomplished debater, he wrote "verse and short plays," and entered the Royal South Street Society literary competition in 1933, winning second place.

By 1926 Howie was employed as a commercial painter, supplying artwork featuring birds and wildflowers, for calendars and suedework. By 1931, James Hamlyn Willis and Ethel McLennan had encouraged Howie to expand his repertoire to include fungi, and his paintings increasingly appeared in scientific publications. Approximately 200 watercolours of fungi, produced between 1931 and 1935, have survived. Paintings by Howie are held in the State Botanical Collection of Victoria, Royal Botanic Gardens Victoria. A further 84 paintings are held by the University of Melbourne Herbarium.

== Publications ==
Howie's watercolour illustrations of fungi and ferns were published in the following works:

- James H. Willis. 1934. The Agaricaceae or 'gilled fungi'. Some species common in Victoria. Victorian Naturalist 50: 264–298.
- Richard W. Bond and Charles Barrett. 1934. Victorian ferns: descriptions of all the species occurring in the State (Melbourne: Field Naturalists' Club of Victoria).
- James H. Willis. 1941. Victorian fungi: a key and descriptive notes to 120 difference toadstools (family Agaricaceae) with remarks on several other families of the higher fungi. (Melbourne: Field Naturalists' Club of Victoria).
- A series of paintings were published in The Weekly Times Wild Nature Notes column.

== Exhibitions ==
His work has been posthumously exhibited, particularly in Melbourne. Exhibitions include:

- Hidden in Plain View: The Forgotten Flora Australian touring exhibition curated by Teresa Lebel, Josephine Milne, and Karen Beckmann, from 2007 to 2009.
- The Eternal Order in Nature: the Science of Botanical Illustration at the Domain House and Gallery between 18 July and 7 August 2011.
- Artists' depictions of Natural History: Fungi, Ferns and their Allies at the Domain House and Gallery in October 2013.
- From botanical illustrations to research: Watercolours from the University of Melbourne Herbarium at the University of Melbourne in 2015.
- Still Life at Buxton Contemporary in 2022.

== Influence ==
Howie has also been cited as an inspiration for The Red Room Company poet Bonny Cassidy.

== Examples of paintings ==
- Malcolm Howie Watercolours via the University of Melbourne Herbarium.
- Botanical art by Malcolm Howie, part of the Royal Botanic Gardens Victoria's botanical artwork collection.
