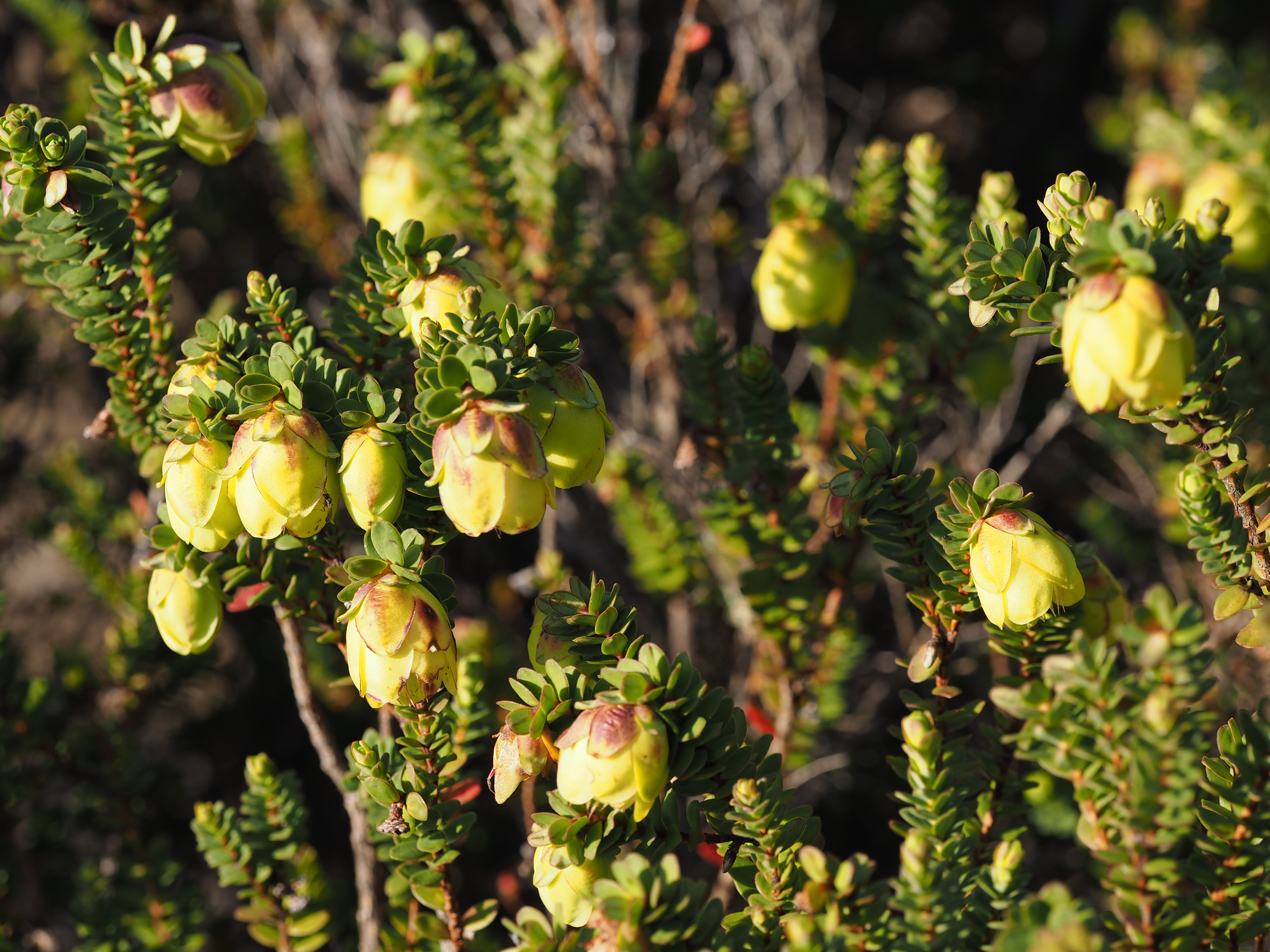
- Darwinia collina foliage and inflorescences, Bluff Knoll

Conservation status
- Endangered (EPBC Act)

Scientific classification
- Kingdom: Plantae
- Clade: Tracheophytes
- Clade: Angiosperms
- Clade: Eudicots
- Clade: Rosids
- Order: Myrtales
- Family: Myrtaceae
- Genus: Darwinia
- Species: D. collina

Binomial name
- Darwinia collina C.A.Gardner
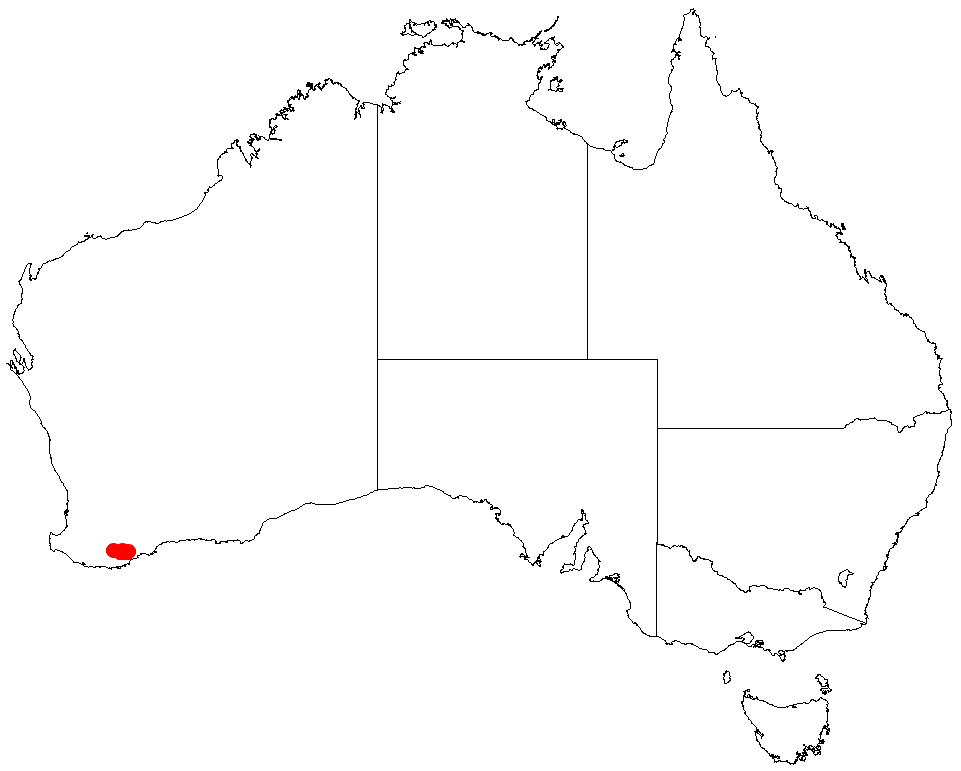
- Occurrence data from AVH

= Darwinia collina =

Yellow mountain bell

Species of flowering plant

Darwinia collina, commonly known as the yellow mountain bell, is a plant in the myrtle family Myrtaceae. It grows as an erect shrub 0.3–1.2 metres (1–4 ft) high with crowded elliptical leaves and bright yellow flower-like inflorescences. It is endemic to a few small areas in the Stirling Range National Park, Western Australia and as a result is classified as an endangered species.

== Description ==
The yellow mountain bell is a small, compact, erect shrub up to about 1.2 metres (4 ft) high. Its leaves are about 10 millimetres (0.4 in) long, 5 millimetres (0.2 in) wide and minutely toothed. Bell-shaped, flower-like inflorescences appear from March to April and from August to November. These are clusters of drooping, nectar-rich flowers with white petals surrounded by larger yellow to lime-green, petal-like bracts. The styles are up to 20 millimetres (0.8 in) long and sometimes protrude slightly beyond the bracts. Both the leaves and bracts of Darwinia collina are more rounded than those of any other Darwinia species. The bell shape of the inflorescence is likely to protect the flowers from rain.

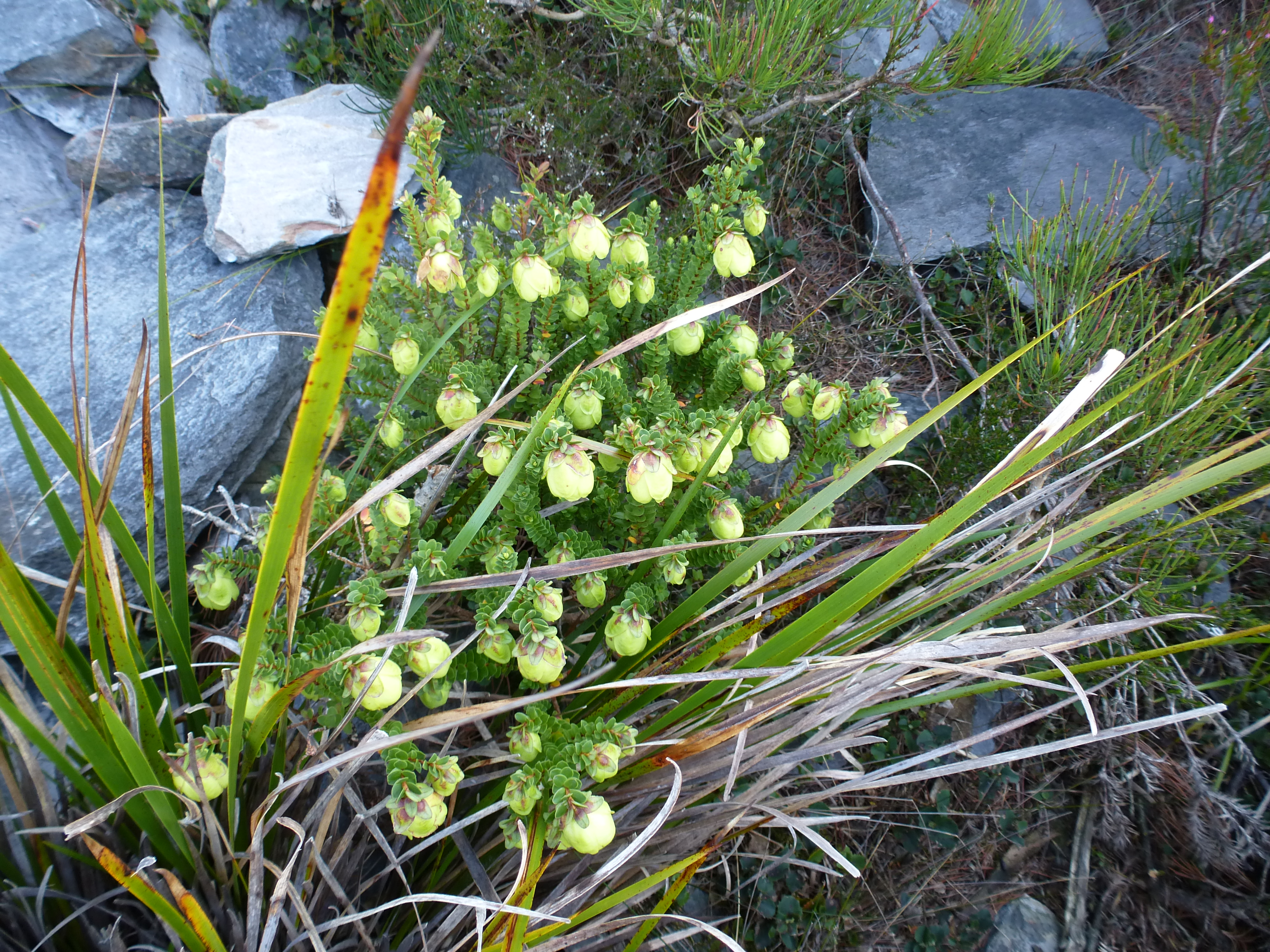
Darwinia collina growth habit

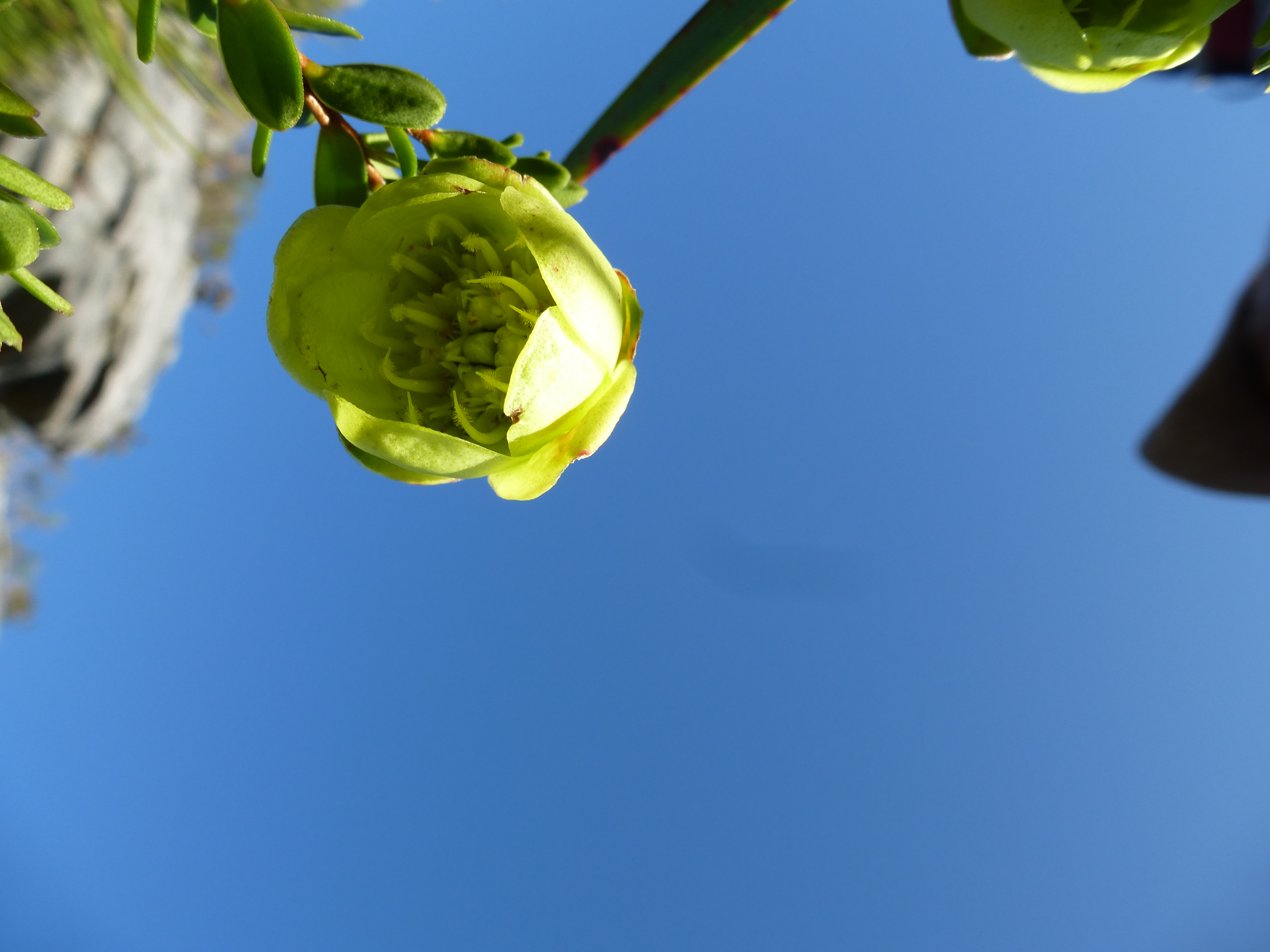
Flowers surrounded by bracts

== Taxonomy ==
Darwinia collina was first formally described in 1923 by C.A.Gardner from a specimen collected on Bluff Knoll by "Mrs Pelloe" and the description was published in Journal and Proceedings of the Royal Society of Western Australia. The specific epithet (collina) is a Latin word meaning "on a hill". Darwinia collina is known to hybridise with Darwinia leiostyla.

== Distribution and habitat ==
The only known locations where Darwinia collina is found are Bluff Knoll, Coyanarup Peak, Bakers Knob and East Bluff in the Stirling Range National Park. These are all on Crown land in the Esperance plains biogeographic region. Other populations have been known in the past but no specimens have been seen in these areas since the 1990s. These extant populations, and most of the extinct ones, are (or were) in areas known to be significantly affected by Phytopthera cinnamomi.

This darwinia grows in dense heath and thicket in shallow, siliceous soils over sandstone and shale on mountain summits. The area in which the populations occur are in the Eastern Stirling Range Montane Heath and Thicket Threatened Ecological Community which only occur at altitudes between 750 and 1090 metres.

== Conservation status ==
Yellow mountain bell is classified as "Threatened Flora (Declared Rare Flora — Extant)" by the Western Australian Government Department of Parks and Wildlife and it has also been listed as "Endangered" (EN) under the Australian Government Environment Protection and Biodiversity Conservation Act 1999 (EPBC Act). The main threats to this species are dieback caused by Phytophthora cinnamomi, inappropriate fire frequency, grazing by rabbits (Oryctolagus cuniculus) and the native quokka (Setonix brachyurus) and damage caused by recreational activities.

== Cultivation ==
As with others in the genus, D. collina is difficult to grow from seed. It can be grown from cuttings and as a potted plant but is difficult to maintain in the garden. Some success has been reported with grafts onto D. citriodora.
