= Eliza Blyth =

Australian artist (1820–1894)

Eliza Blyth (1820 – 27 March 1894) was an Australian botanical illustrator, landscape painter and drawing teacher.

== Life and career ==
Eliza Blyth was born in Essex, England in 1820. Her mother, Elizabeth Crowther, was a sketcher. Blyth had 18 siblings, some of whom moved to Tasmania before her.

In 1848 she migrated to Tasmania on the Himalaya. Also on board was Francis Nixon, the first Anglican bishop in Tasmania. He was a watercolour painter and helped her develop her artistic technique.

== Death and legacy ==
Blyth suffered from chronic rheumatism and exhaustion and died on 27 March 1894 at Sorell, Tasmania.

The Art Gallery of Ballarat holds examples of her work.
