= Emily Pelloe =

Australian botanical illustrator (1878–1941)

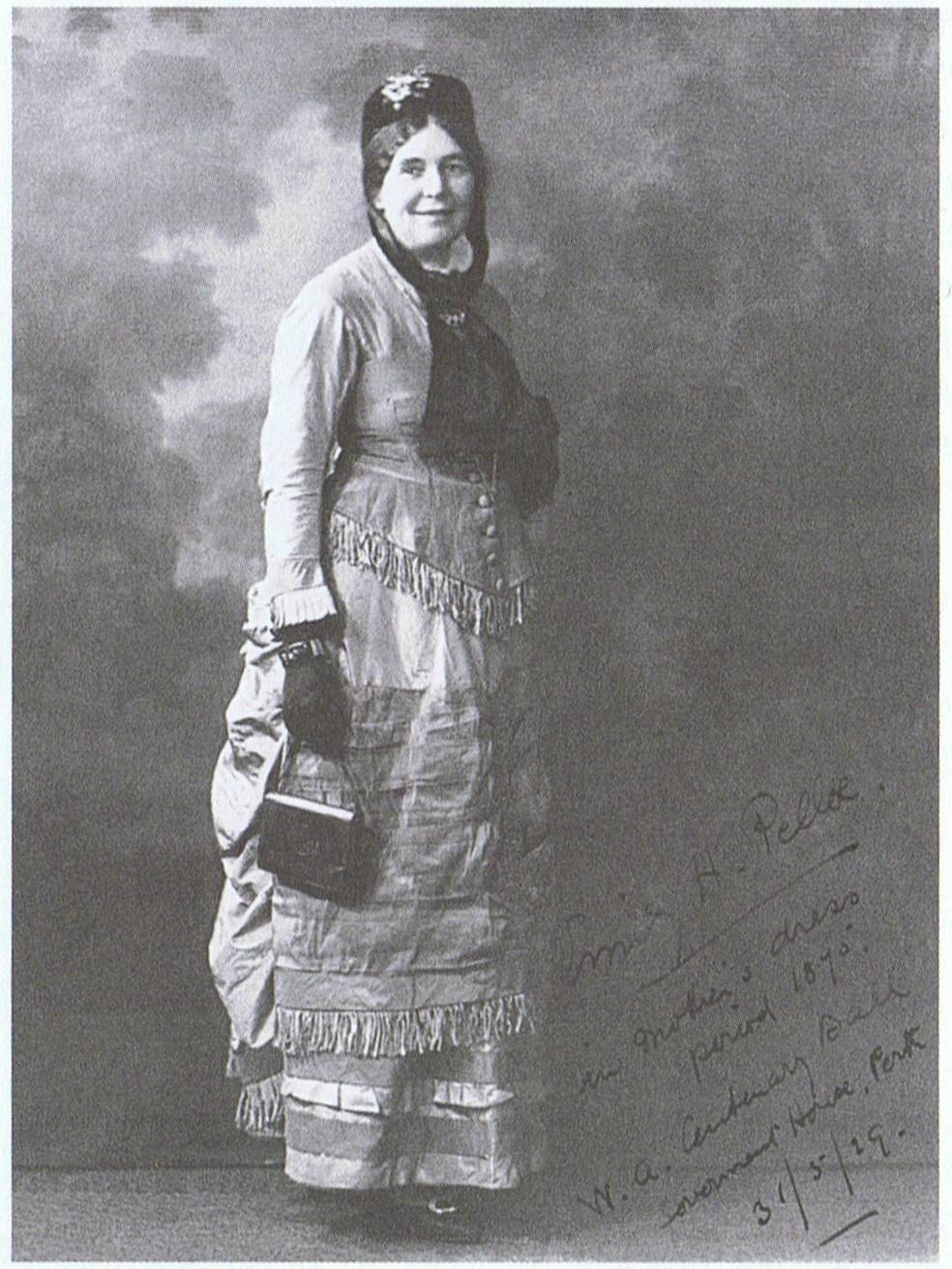
Emily Pelloe dressed for the 1929 Centenary Ball, Perth

Emily Harriet Pelloe (3 May 1878 – 15 April 1941) was a botanical illustrator, and author of books, of the flowering plants of Western Australia. Her work in watercolour, extensive illustrations, and English language descriptions were included in a number of publications on the flora of the State.

== Biography ==
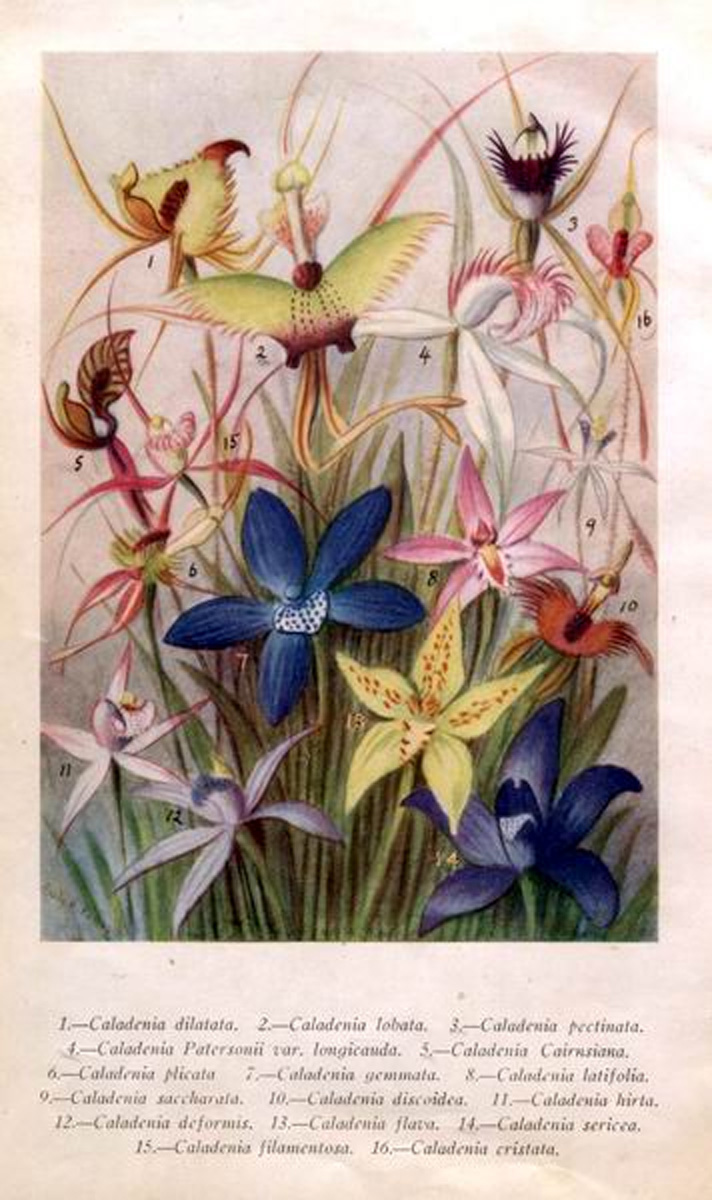
Caladenia Plate 1 from West Australian Orchids

Emily Sundercombe was born in St Kilda, later moving to Perth, Western Australia where she married a banker, Theodore Parker Pelloe, in 1902. An early interest in equestrian sports was replaced with an interest in botany in 1916. In 1920 she wrote for The West Australian, in a column 'Women's Interests' as 'Ixia', and contributed to such organisations as the Country Women's Association, a writers club, and continued her interest with horse riding.

She began to paint and publish a large number of watercolours, her landscapes were also acquired by government departments. She collaborated with the state botanist, C. A. Gardner, in producing her books, and was included in Hal Colebatch's A Story of a Hundred Years: Western Australia, 1829–1929.

Aside from a number of paintings and illustrations, her most noted works are Wildflowers of Western Australia in 1921 and West Australian Orchids in 1930. These publications were intended to be accessible by amateur naturalists and enthusiasts, the scientific descriptions were accompanied with more 'subjective' exposition. The specimens are carefully illustrated, painted, and described, yet her Drosera and Cephalotus were presented as "bloodthirsty savages of plant life". The books were popular and commended.

Several publications were issued as Wildflowers Of Western Australia, another so-titled (1936) by the state's Tourist & Publicity Bureau was by Gardner, with a painting by Emily Pelloe. Another was published in 1941 by Gardner; 'localities and flowering seasons, by Emily H. Pelloe'. These shorter publications were for the promotion and celebration of the states flora, and similar works continued to be produced as supplements in the West Australian newspaper for many years.

== Legacy ==
Her career was abbreviated by ill health and she died while riding a horse in 1941. The large collection of paintings by Emily Pelloe was presented to the University of Western Australia in a ceremony the following year. The gift was made by her husband and received by the Governor of the State, Sir James Mitchell, who gave a eulogy. The collection of over 400 paintings is housed at St. Catherine's College, and within the department of botany.

== See also ==
- List of Australian botanical illustrators
