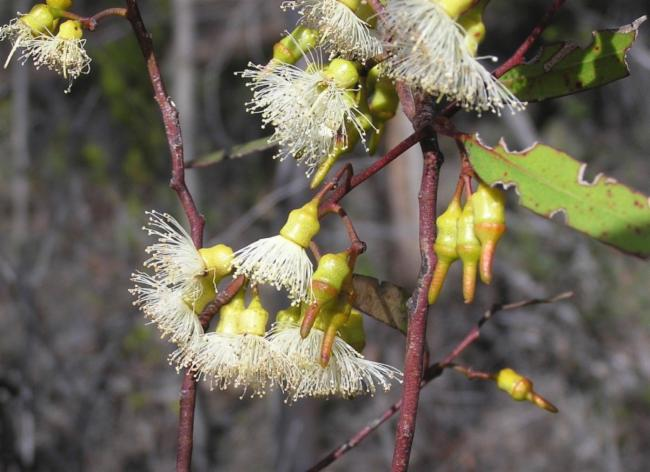
- Flowers and buds of E. flocktoniae

Conservation status
- Vulnerable (IUCN 3.1)

Scientific classification
- Kingdom: Plantae
- Clade: Tracheophytes
- Clade: Angiosperms
- Clade: Eudicots
- Clade: Rosids
- Order: Myrtales
- Family: Myrtaceae
- Genus: Eucalyptus
- Species: E. flocktoniae

Binomial name
- Eucalyptus flocktoniae Maiden

Synonyms
- Eucalyptus oleosa var. flocktoni Maiden orth. var.; Eucalyptus oleosa var. flocktoniae Maiden

= Eucalyptus flocktoniae =

Merrit

Species of eucalyptus

Eucalyptus flocktoniae, commonly known as merrit or Flockton's mallee, is a species of tree or mallee that is endemic to Western Australia. It has smooth, silvery grey bark, lance-shaped to curved adult leaves, prominently beaked flower buds in groups of seven or nine and barrel-shaped or urn-shaped fruit.

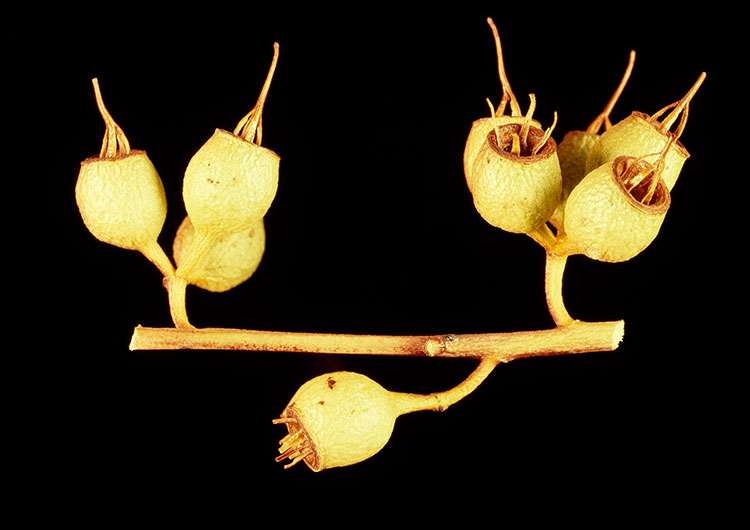
Fruit

== Description ==
Eucalyptus flocktoniae is a tree or a mallee that typically grows to a height of 2.5–15 m (8 ft 2 in – 49 ft 3 in) and forms a lignotuber. It has smooth silvery grey or brownish bark, sometimes with a small amount of rough bark near the base. Young plants and coppice regrowth have elliptical to egg-shaped or lance-shaped leaves that are 40–75 mm (1.6–3.0 in) long and 15–25 mm (0.59–0.98 in) wide. Adult leaves are lance-shaped to curved, the some glossy green on both sides, 60–110 mm (2.4–4.3 in) long and 8–20 mm (0.31–0.79 in) wide on a petiole 10–22 mm (0.39–0.87 in) long. The flower buds are arranged in leaf axils in groups of seven or nine on an unbranched peduncle 6–15 mm (0.24–0.59 in) long, the individual buds on pedicels 3–6 mm (0.12–0.24 in) long. Mature buds are oval, 11–18 mm (0.43–0.71 in) long and 4–6 mm (0.16–0.24 in) wide with a prominently beaked to horn-shaped operculum 7–12 mm (0.28–0.47 in) long. Flowering occurs from August to December or from January to April and the flowers are white to cream-coloured or pale yellow. The fruit is a woody, barrel-shaped or urn-shaped capsule 7–10 mm (0.28–0.39 in) long and 6–9 mm (0.24–0.35 in) wide.

== Taxonomy and naming ==
Merrit was first formally described in 1911 by Joseph Maiden who gave it the name Eucalyptus oleosa var. flocktoniae in the Journal of the Natural History & Science Society of Western Australia. In 1916, Maiden raised the variety to species status as E. flocktoniae. The specific epithet (flocktoniae) honours "Miss Margaret Flockton, the accomplished artist of my 'Critical Revision of the genus Eucalyptus' and 'Forest Flora of New South Wales'".

"Merrit" is the name given to the species by Noongar people.

In 1999, Dean Nicolle and John Conran described two subspecies and the names have been accepted by the Australian Plant Census:

- Eucalyptus flocktoniae (Maiden) Maiden subsp. flocktoniae has glossy green leaves;
- Eucalyptus flocktoniae subsp. hebes D.Nicolle has bluish green leaves.

== Distribution and habitat ==
Eucalyptus flocktoniae usually grows in open woodland and forest on sandy plains. Subspecies flocktoniae occurs between Mingenew, the Stirling Range and the Ravensthorpe area. Subspecies hebes has a narrower distribution mainly between Esperance and Balladonia.

=== Gallery ===
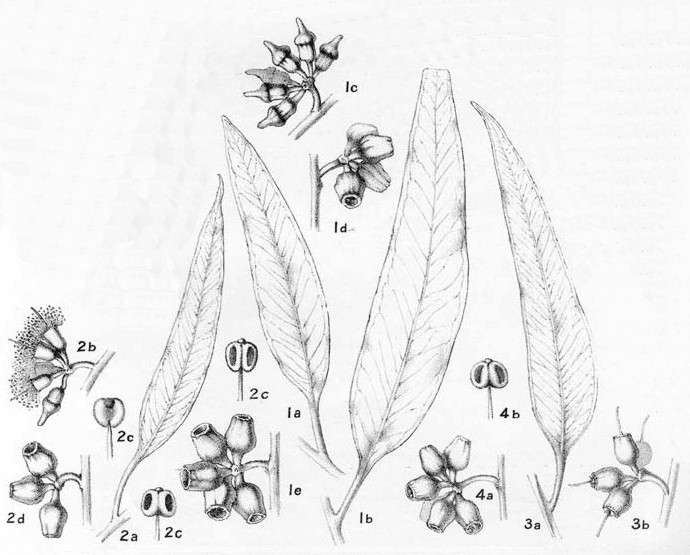
Illustration by Margaret Flockton

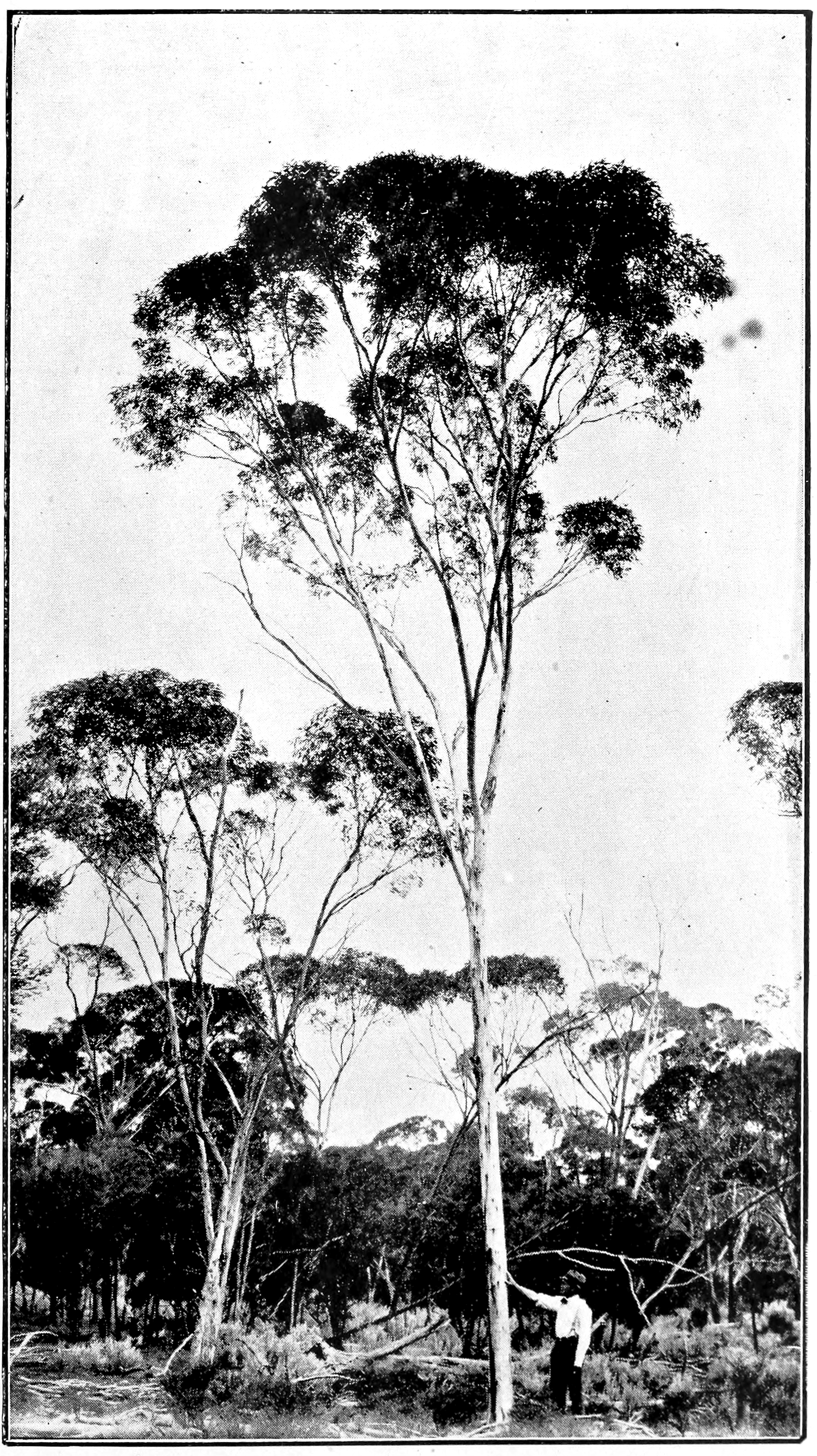
Mature tree, circa 1920

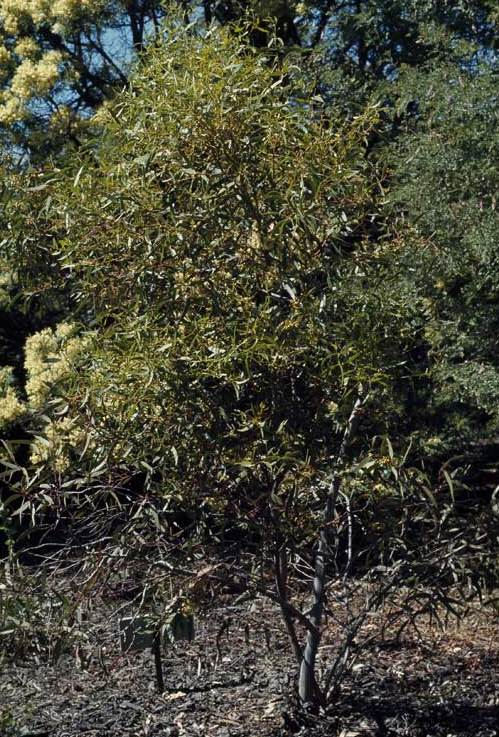
Habit in the ANBG
