= Susannah Blaxill =

Australian botanical artist (born 1954)

- Born: 1954; Armidale, New South Wales, Australia
- Died: 1 July 2025 (aged 70–71)
- Occupation: Artist
- Style: Botanical illustration
- Website: www.blaxill.com

Susannah Blaxill (1954 – 1 July 2025) was an Australian botanical artist.

Blaxill was born in 1954 in Armidale, Australia. She lived primarily in Australia, but lived in England for about 17 years, where she became a member of the Society of Botanical Artists. She is internationally recognised as a leading artist specialising in watercolour, pencil and charcoal drawings. Her work is held as part of the Shirley Sherwood Collection. Her most famous work is a beetroot featured in multiple media around the world.

Blaxill died on 1 July 2025.
