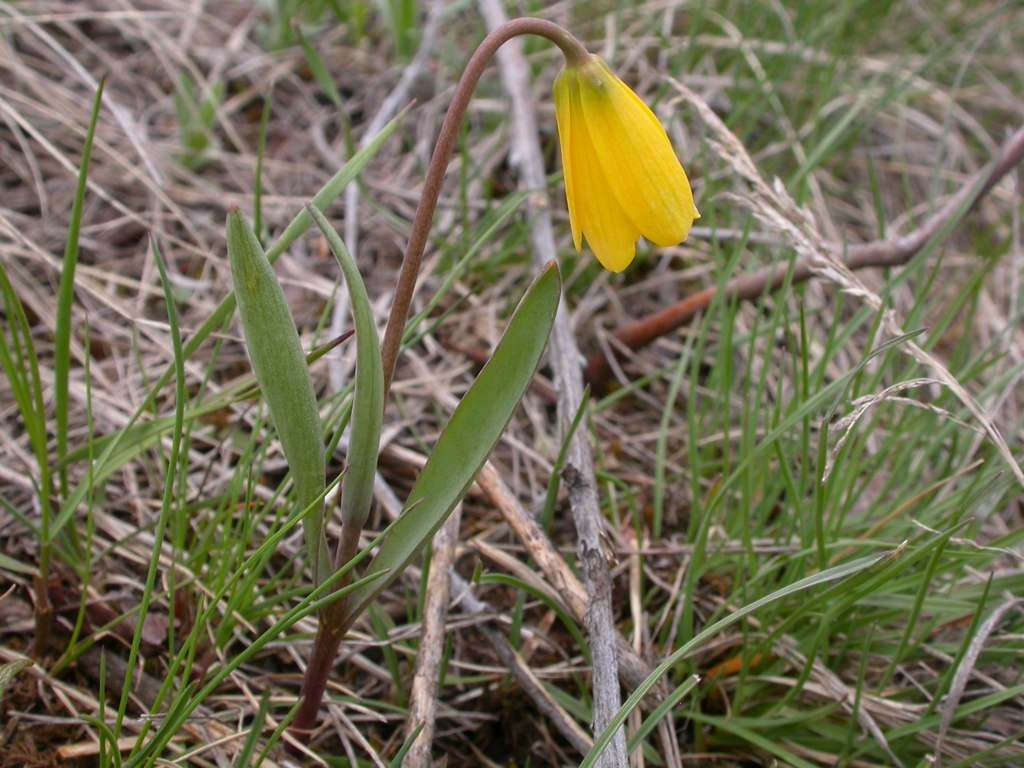
- In Burke Park, Bozeman, Montana

Conservation status
- Secure (NatureServe)

Scientific classification
- Kingdom: Plantae
- Clade: Tracheophytes
- Clade: Angiosperms
- Clade: Monocots
- Order: Liliales
- Family: Liliaceae
- Subfamily: Lilioideae
- Genus: Fritillaria
- Species: F. pudica

Binomial name
- Fritillaria pudica (Pursh) Spreng.

Synonyms
- List: Amblirion pudicum (Pursh) Raf.; Amblirion pudicum var. biflorum Torr.; Fritillaria dichroa Gand.; Fritillaria leucella Gand.; Fritillaria oregonensis Gand.; Fritillaria oreodoxa Gand.; Fritillaria utahensis Gand.; Fritillaria washingtonensis Gand.; Lilium pudicum Pursh; Ochrocodon pudicus (Pursh) Rydb.; Theresia pudica (Pursh) Klatt; Tulipa pudica (Pursh) Raf.

= Fritillaria pudica =

Yellow fritillary

Plant species in the lily family

Fritillaria pudica, the yellow fritillary, is a small perennial plant found in the sagebrush country in the western United States (Idaho, Montana, Oregon, Washington, Wyoming, very northern California, Nevada, northwestern Colorado, North Dakota and Utah) and Canada (Alberta and British Columbia). It is a member of the lily family Liliaceae. Another common (but somewhat ambiguous) name is "yellow bells", since it has a bell-shaped yellow flower. It may be found in dryish, loose soil; it is amongst the first plants to flower after the snow melts, but the flower does not last very long; as the petals age, they turn a brick-red colour and begin to curl outward. The flowers grow singly or in pairs on the stems, and the floral parts grow in multiples of threes. The species produces a small corm, which forms corms earning the genus the nickname 'riceroot'. During his historic journey, Meriwether Lewis collected a specimen while passing through Idaho in 1806.

The corm can be dug up and eaten fresh or cooked; it served Native Americans as a good source of food in times past, and is still eaten occasionally. Today these plants are not common, so digging and eating the corms is not encouraged. The plant is called [q̓aw̓x̌e] in Salish and [ˈsɨkni] in Sahaptin.

Yellow Bells have a similar nutrient profile to a potato but have 50 percent more protein, six times as much calcium, and nearly 30 times more iron. At 64 calories per 100g fresh weight, Yellow Bell bulbs have more caloric value than Common Camas (61 cal/100g) but less than Northern Riceroot (98 cal/100g). Yellow Bells are slightly higher in fat and much higher in calcium but lower in carbohydrates than both Common Camas and Northern Riceroot.
