= List of florilegia and botanical codices =

A timeline of illustrated botanical works to 1900.

== BCE ==
- Enquiry into Plants Theophrastus (371—287 BCE)

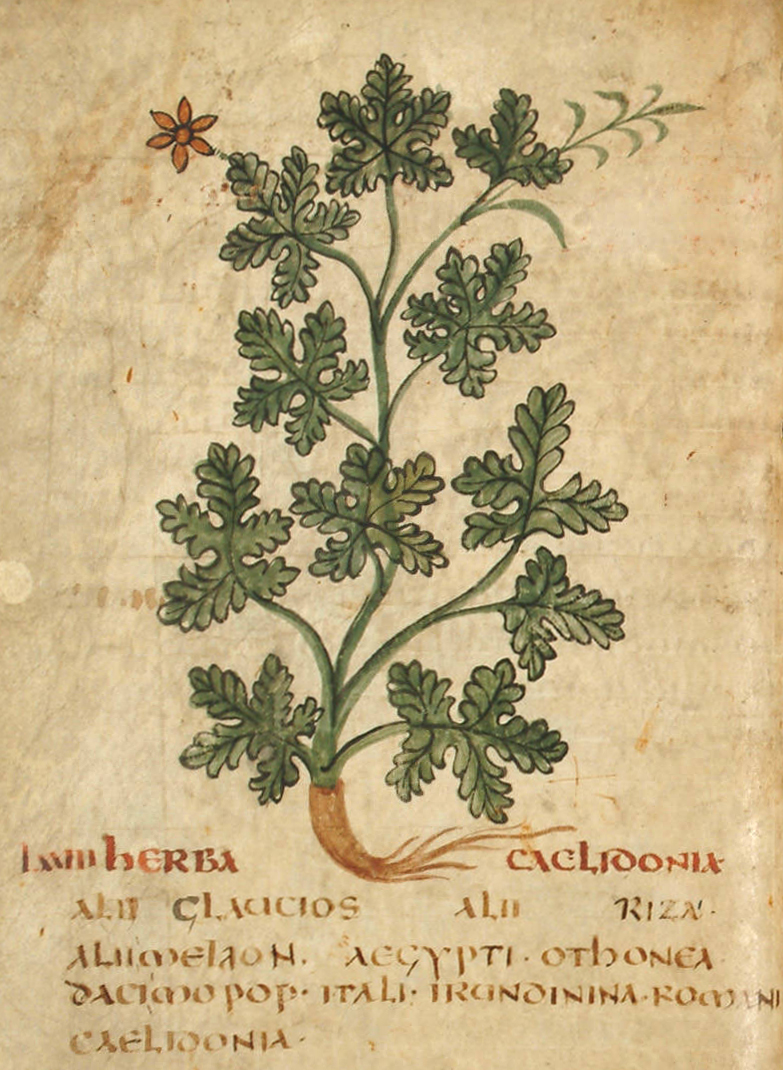
Chelidonium majus from copy of 6th-century Pseudo-Apuleius

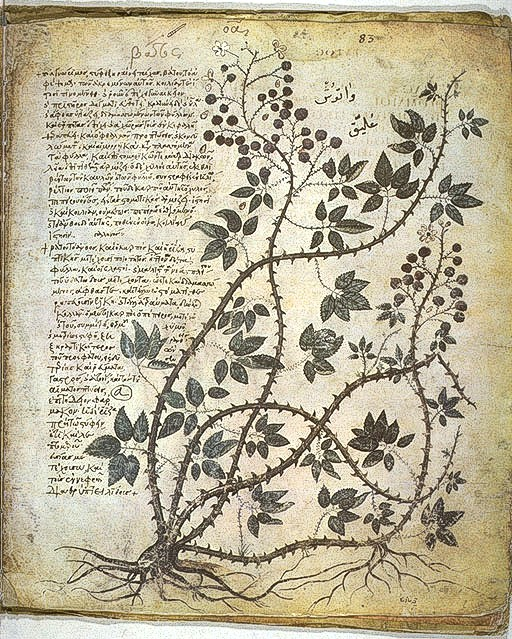
6th-century Greek copy of De Materia Medica

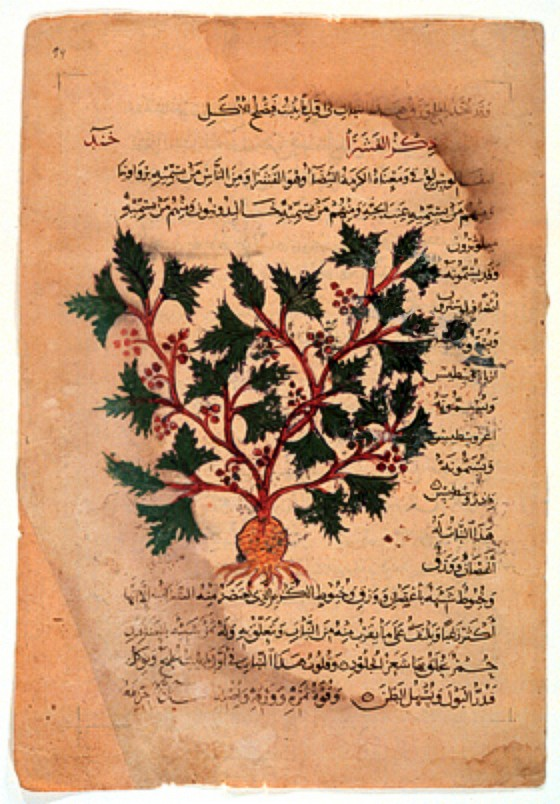
13th-century Arabic copy of De Materia Medica

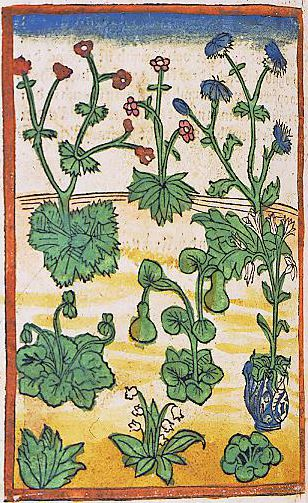
Das Buch der Natur 1475

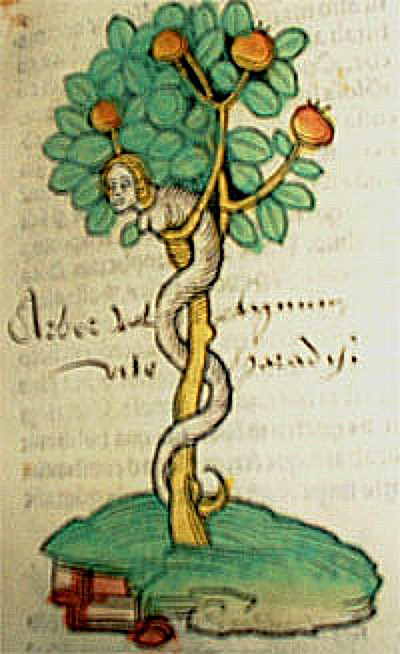
Tree of Life Hortus Sanitatis 1491

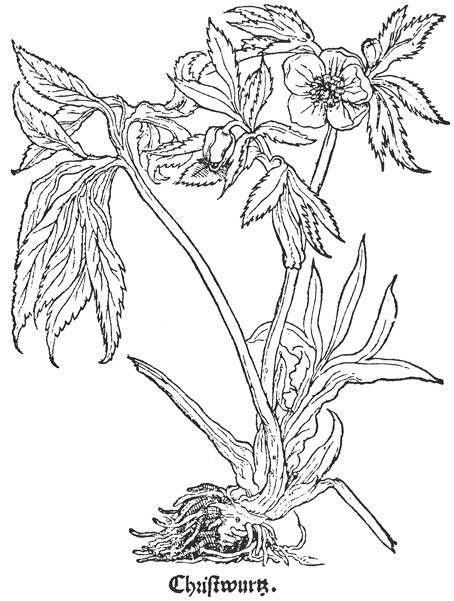
Helleborus niger Herbarium Vivae Eicones 1530

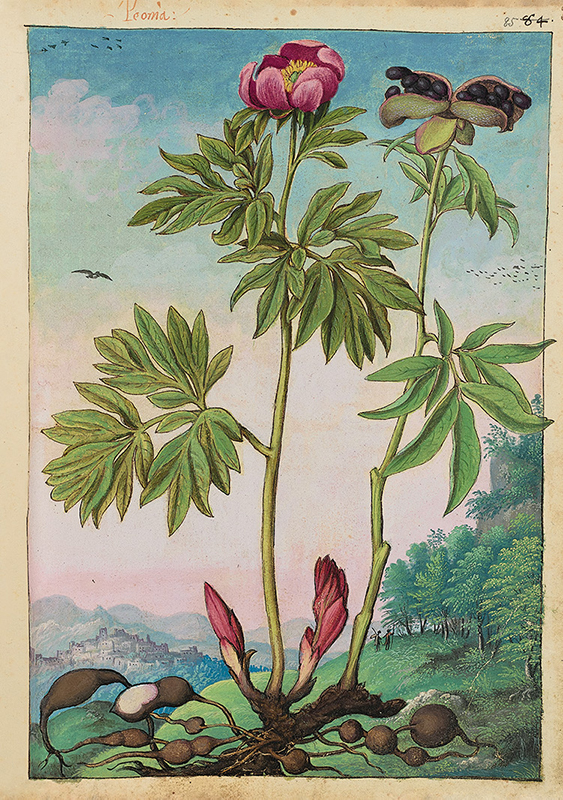
Paeonia officinalis L. Mattioli's Dioscorides illustrated by Cibo, c. 1565

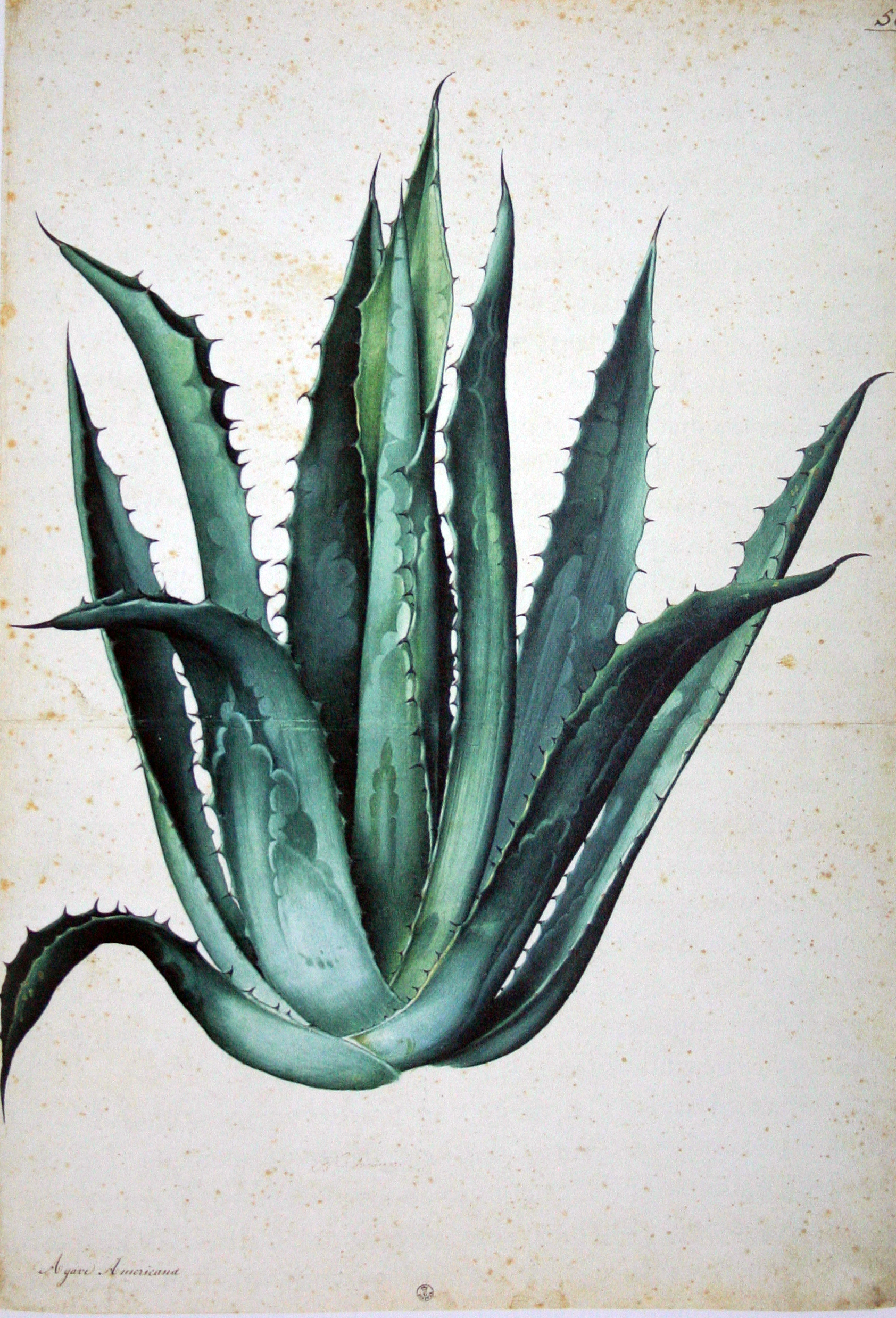
Agave americana Jacopo Ligozzi (1547–1627)

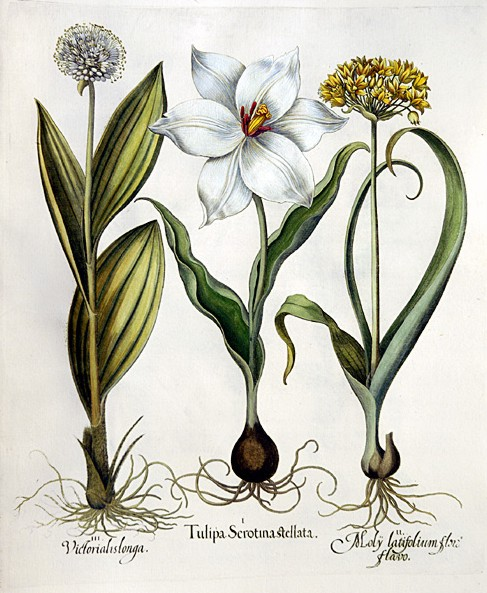
Plate 79 Hortus Eystettensis 1613

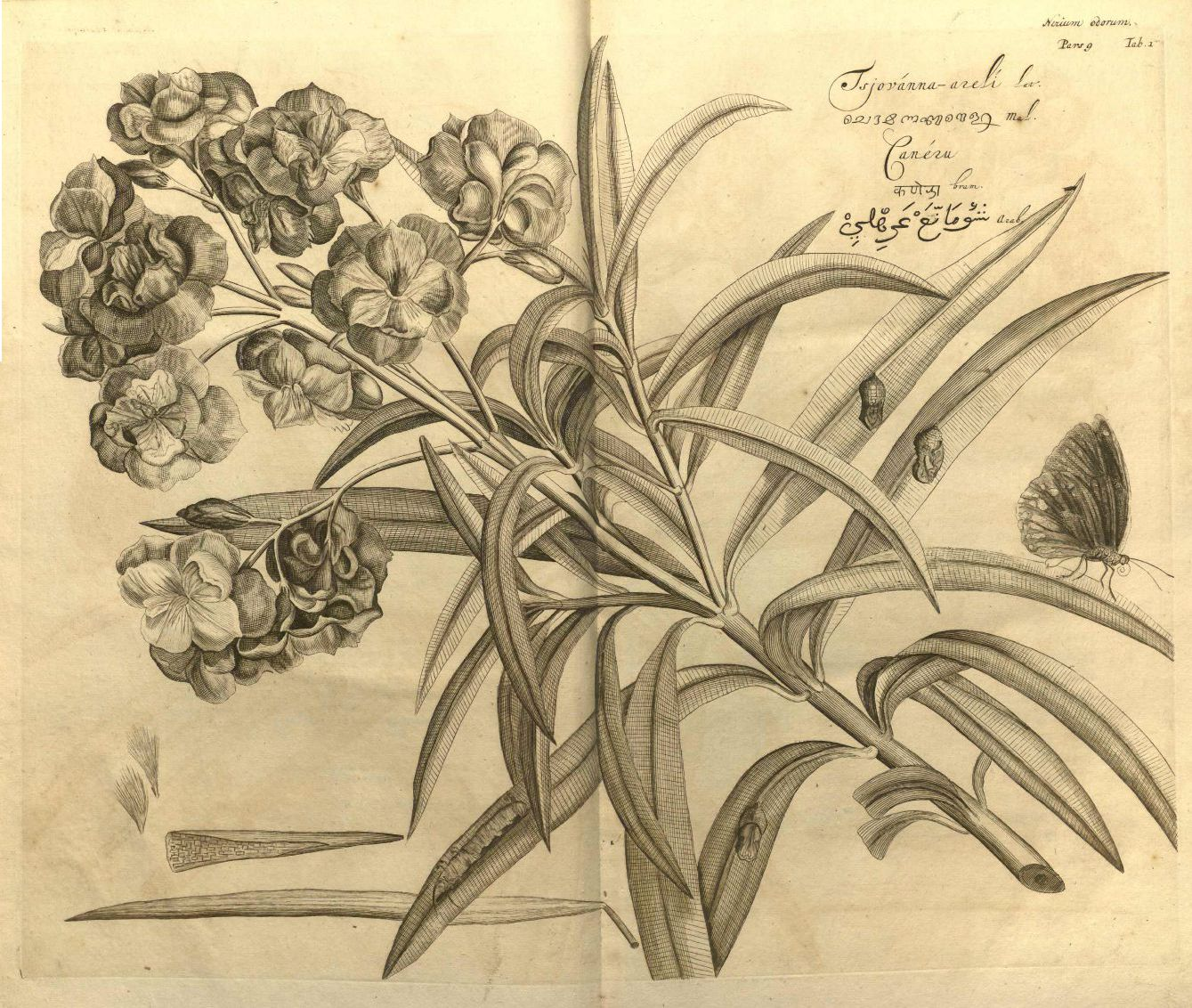
Hortus Malabaricus 1678 Nerium oleander

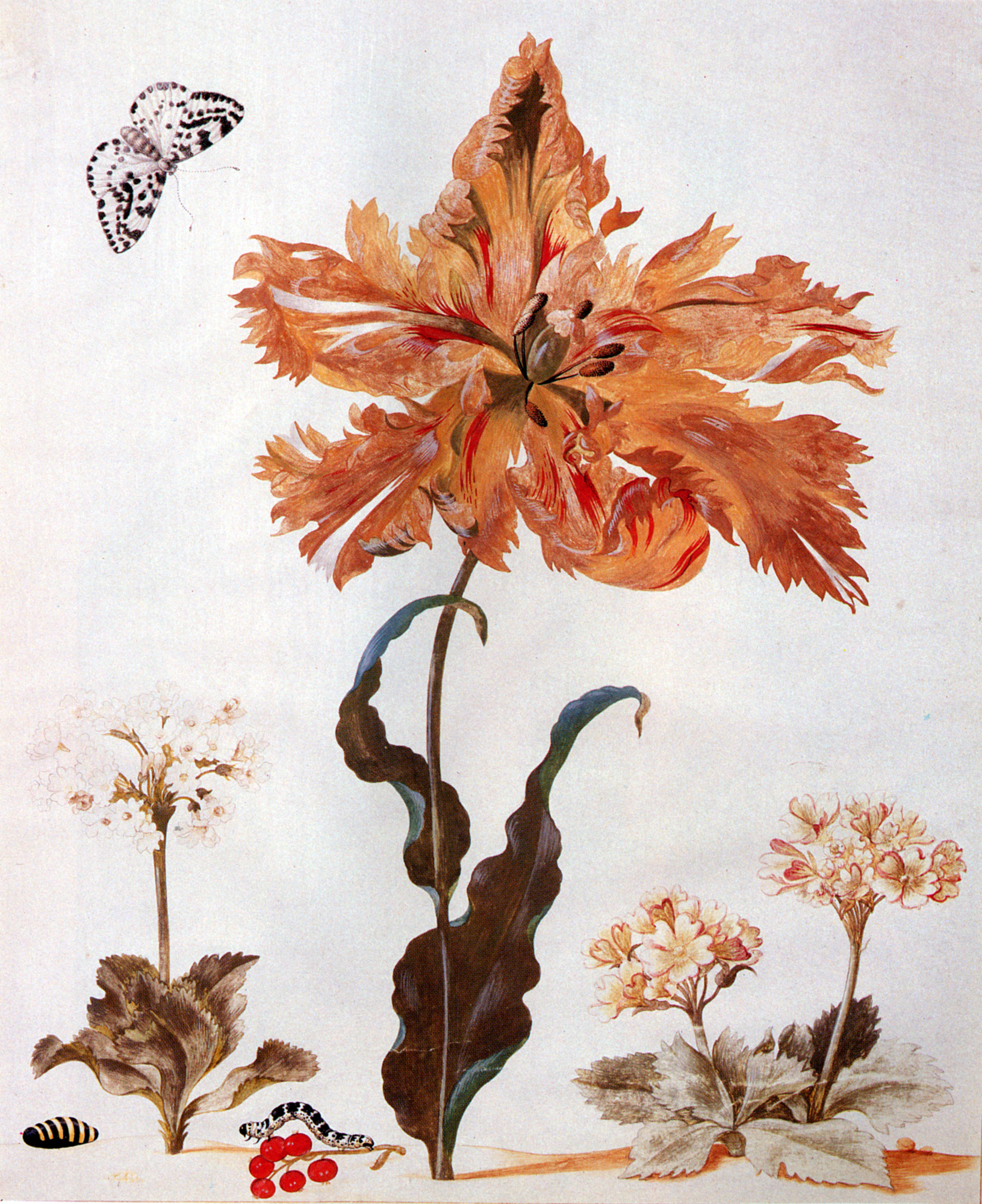
Maria Sibylla Merian 1700

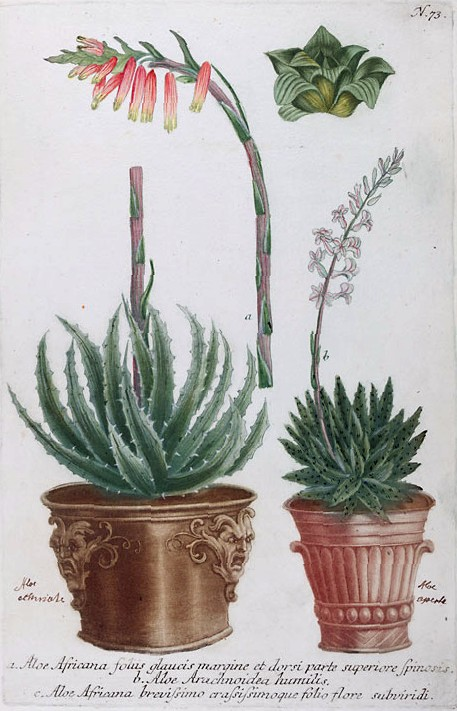
Plate 73 Phytanthoza iconographia 1737

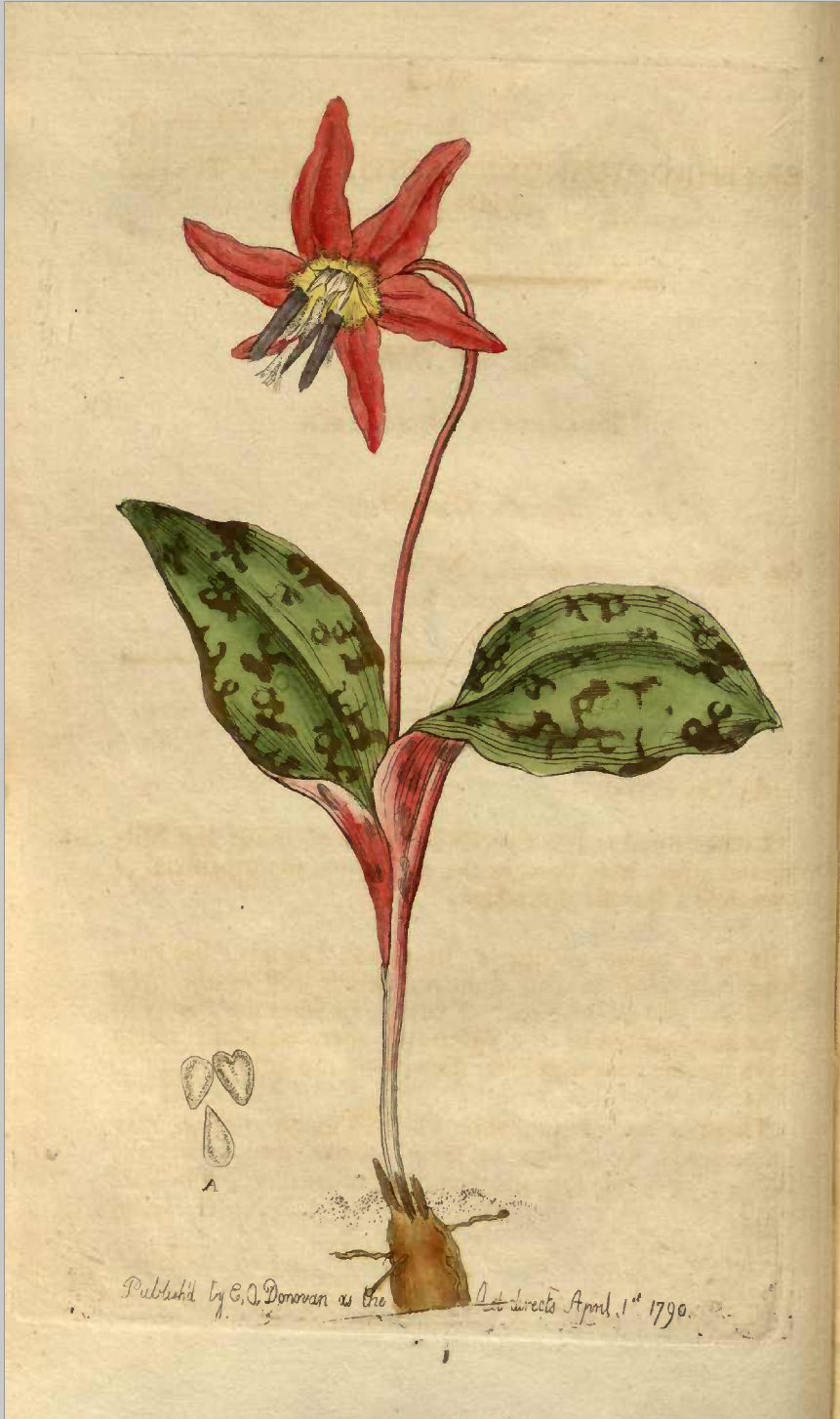
Erythronium dens-canis Edward Donovan 1789

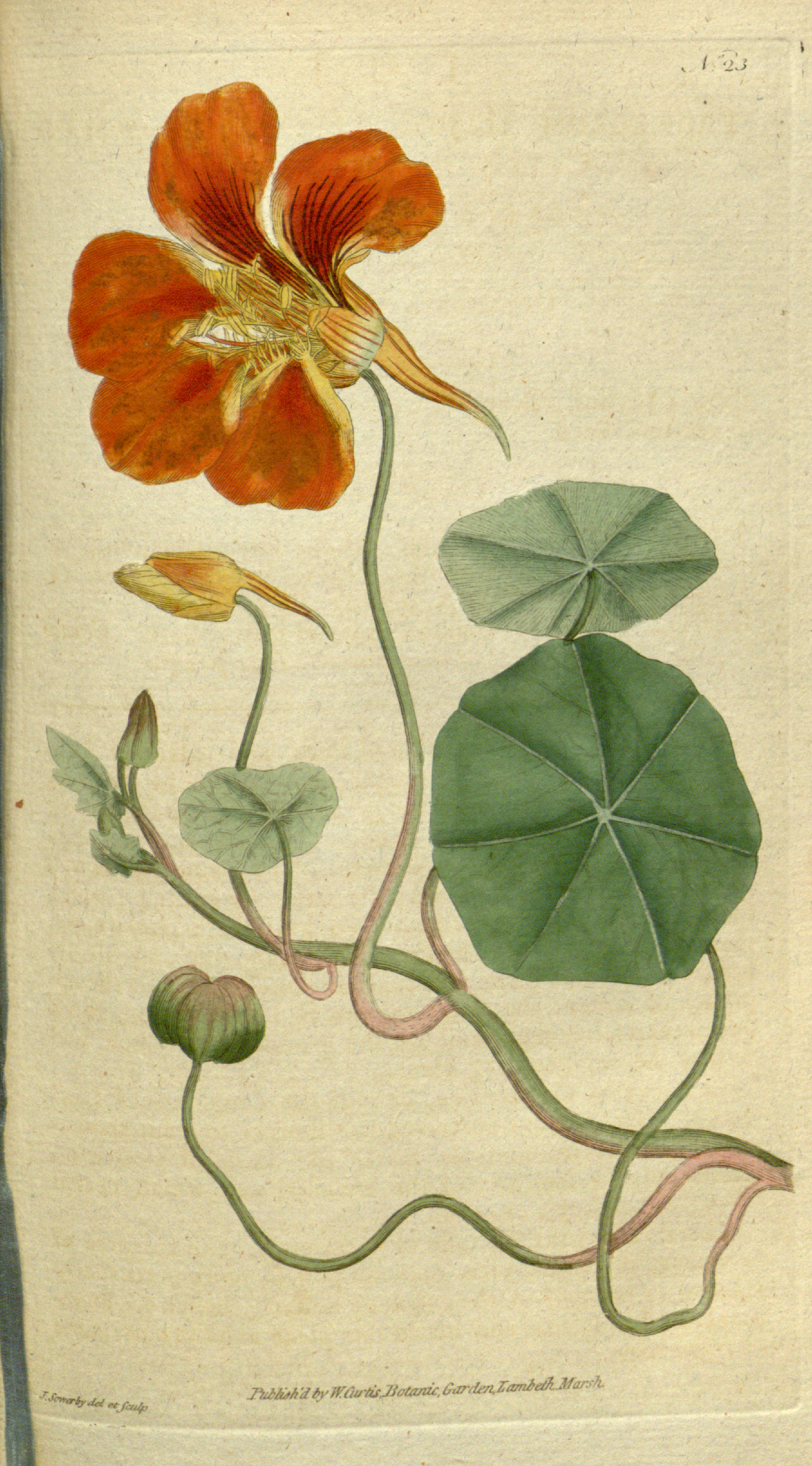
Tropaeolum majus James Sowerby The Botanical Magazine 1790

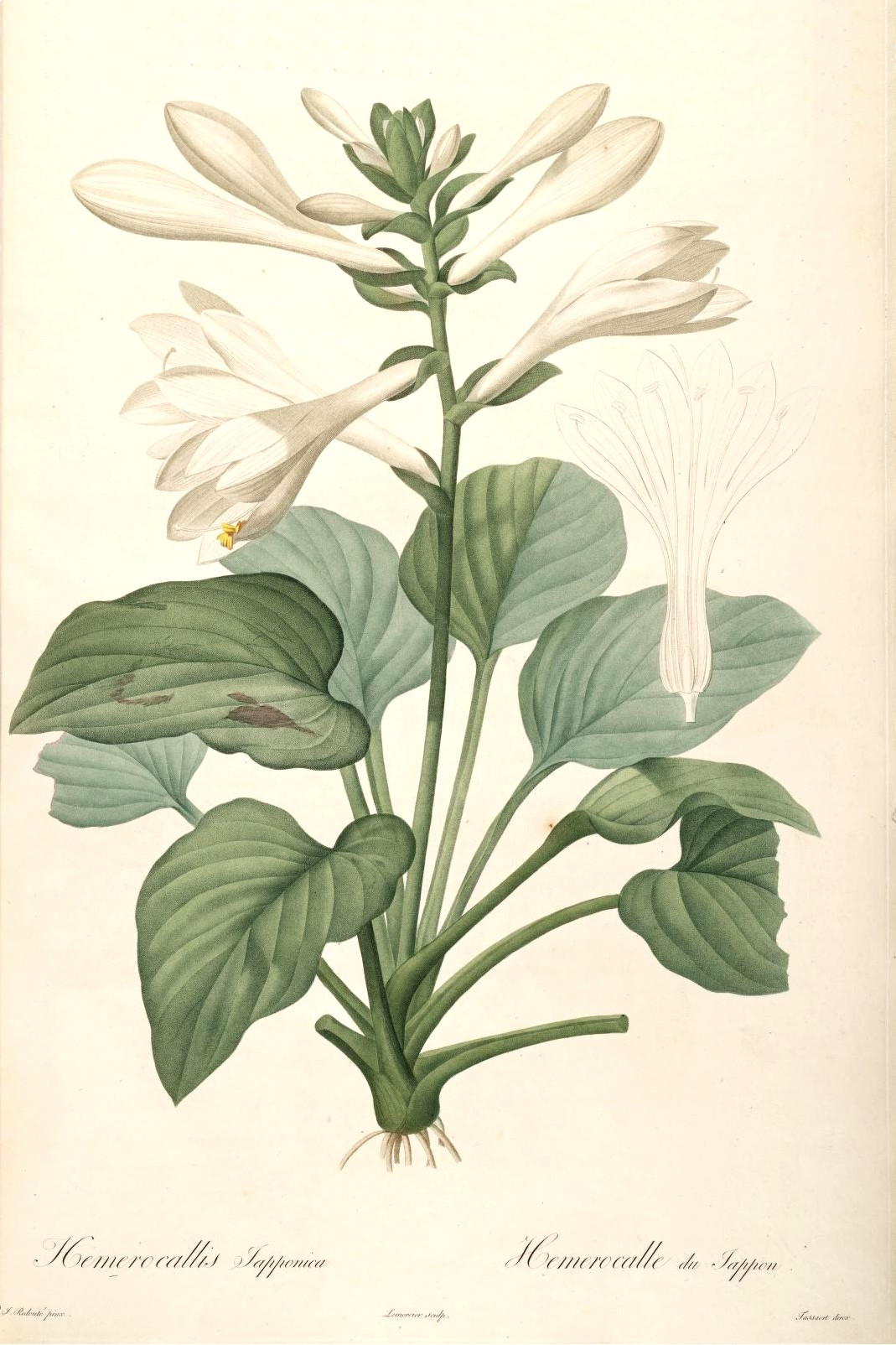
Hemerocallis japonica Pierre-Joseph Redouté Les liliacées 1802

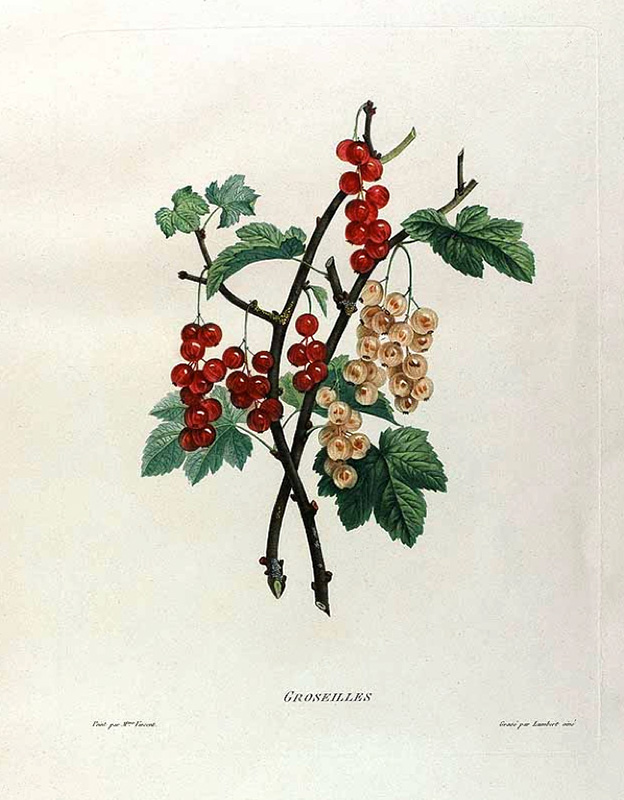
Red currant (Ribes rubrum), engraving after a painting by Henriette Vincent, 1820.

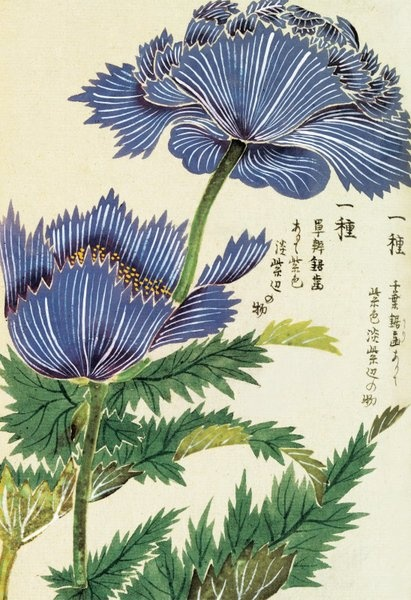
Papaver somniferum var paeoniflorum Iwasaki Tsunemasa Illustrated Manual of Medicinal Plants 1828

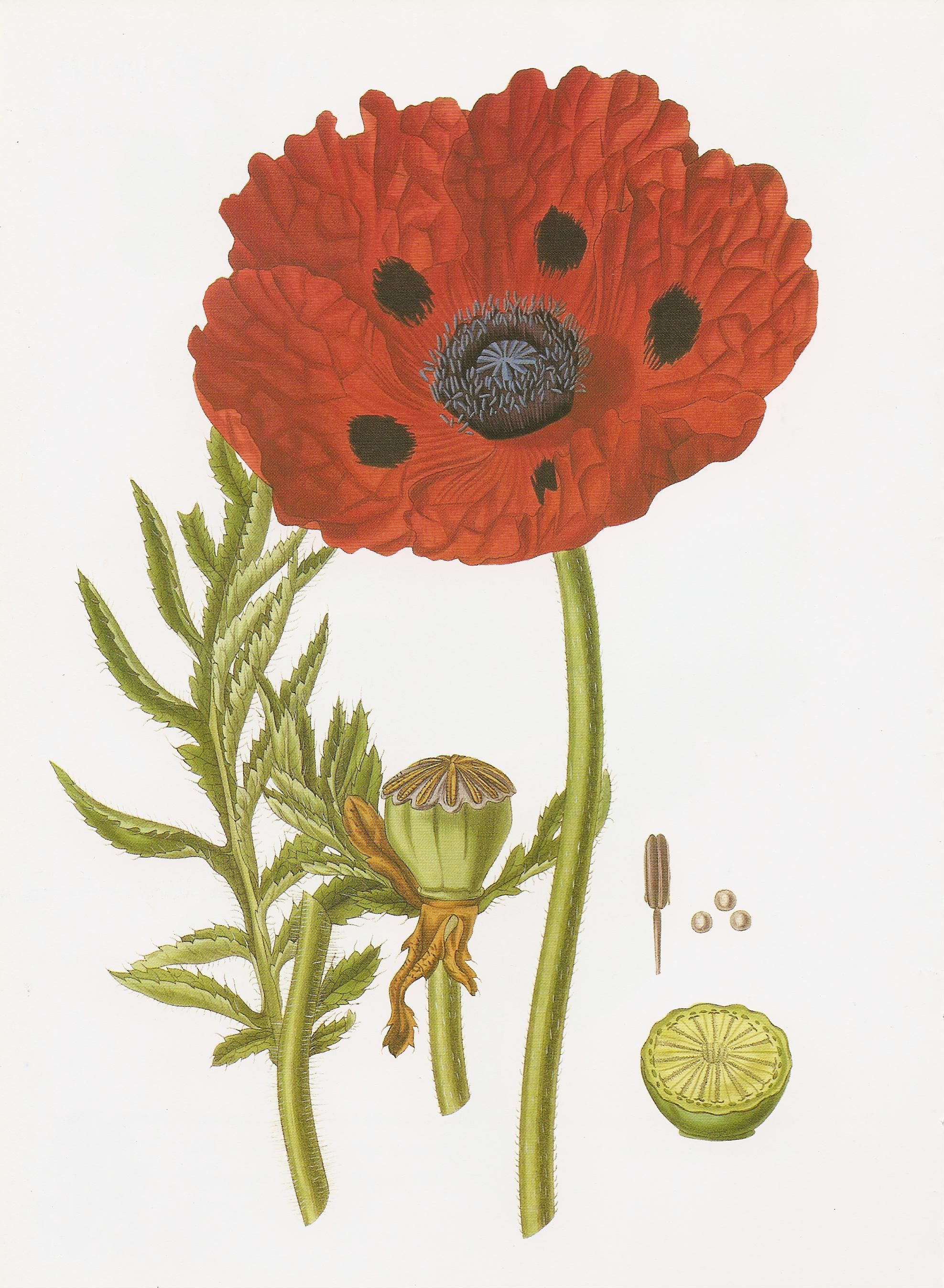
Papaver bracteatum John Lindley Collectanea botanica 1821

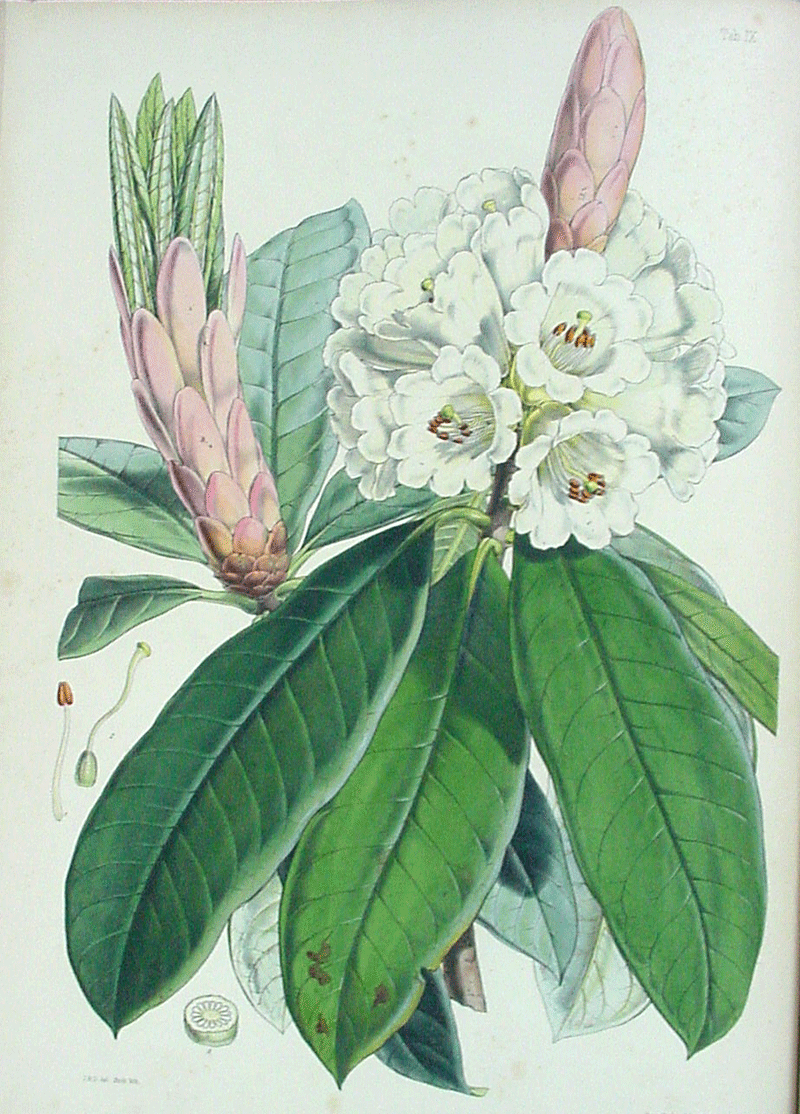
Rhododendron argenteum Walter Hood Fitch Rhododendrons of Sikkim Himalaya 1849

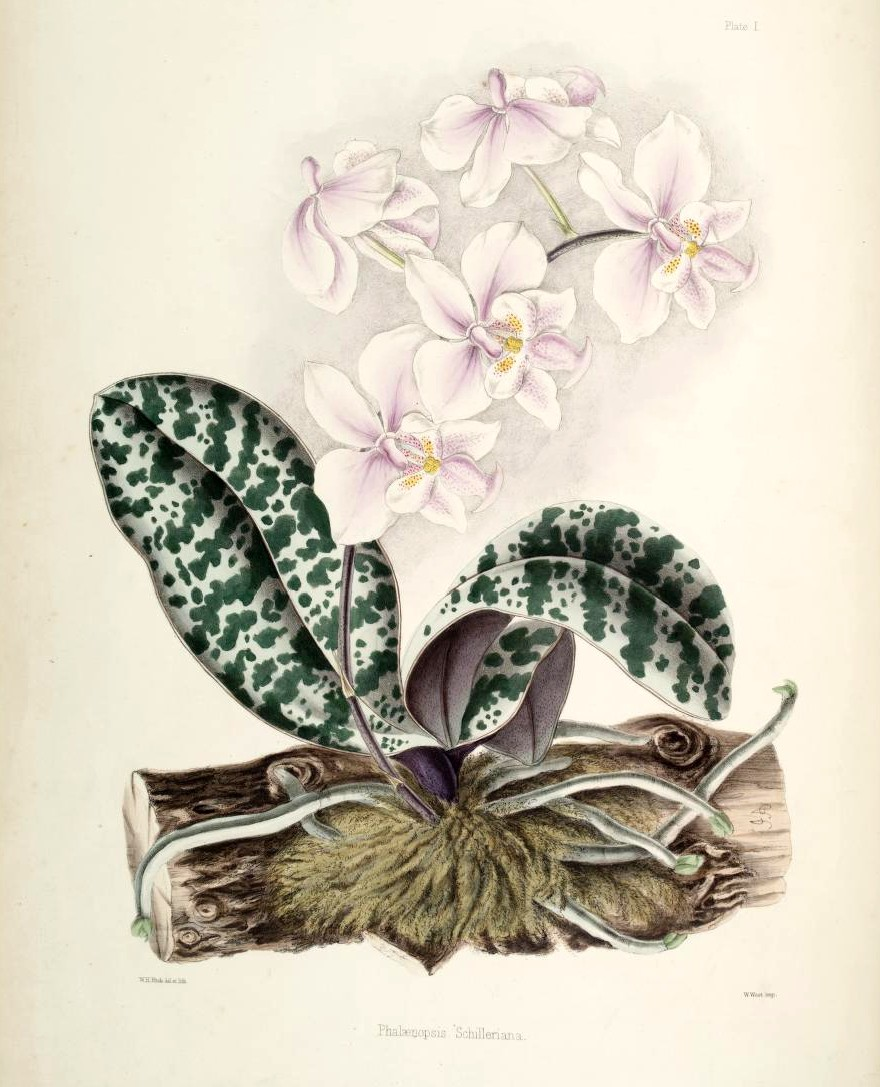
Phalaenopsis schilleriana Walter Hood Fitch Select Orchidaceous Plants 1862

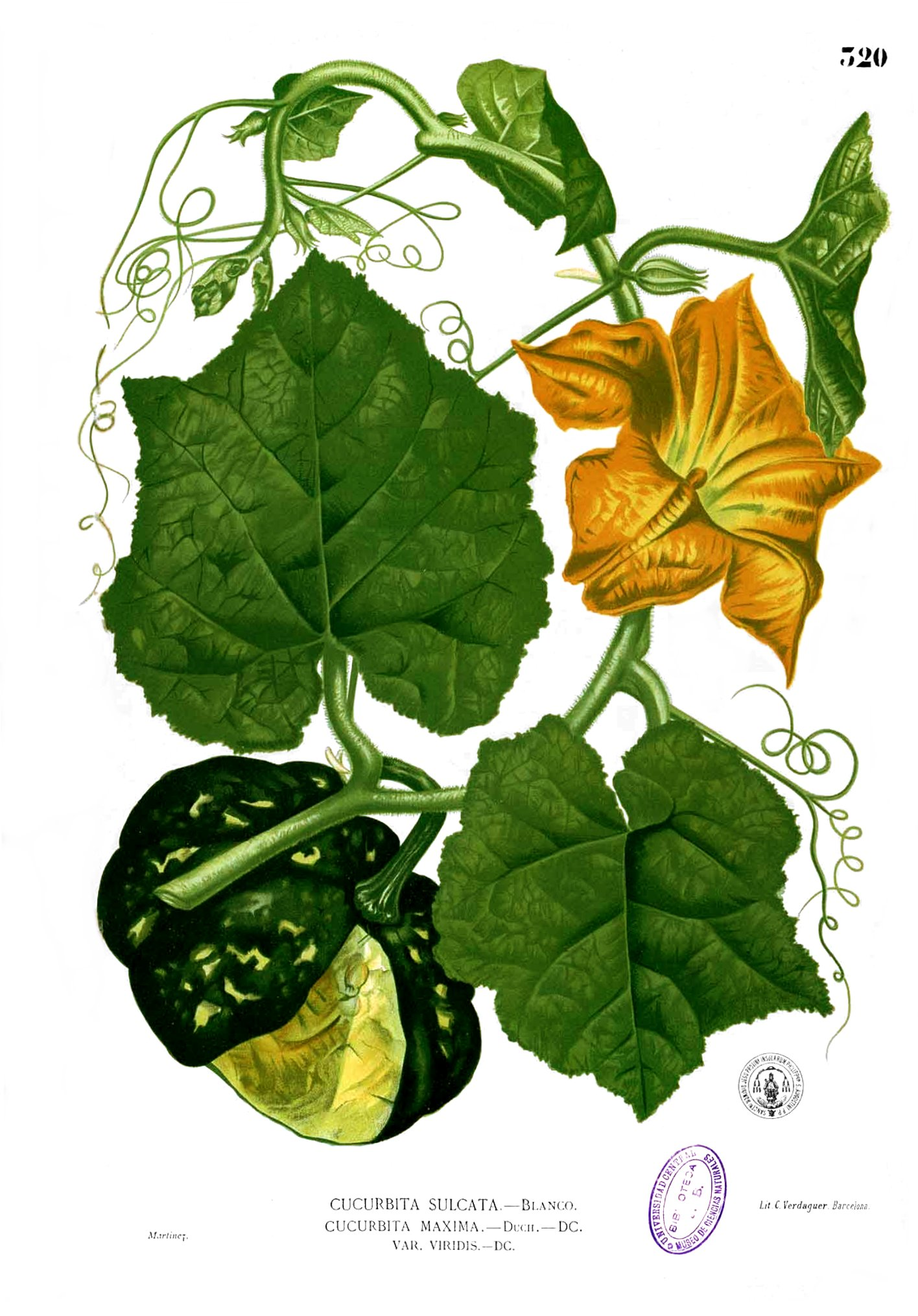
Cucurbita maxima Francisco Manuel Blanco Flora de Filipinas 1877

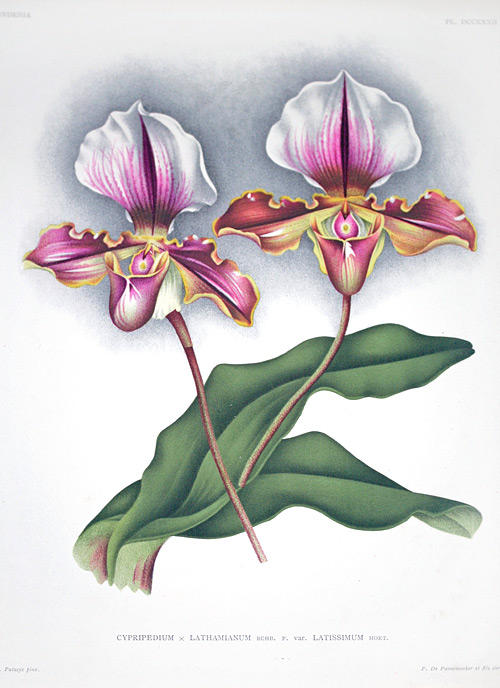
Cypripedium lathamianum Jean Jules Linden Iconographie des Orchidées 1885

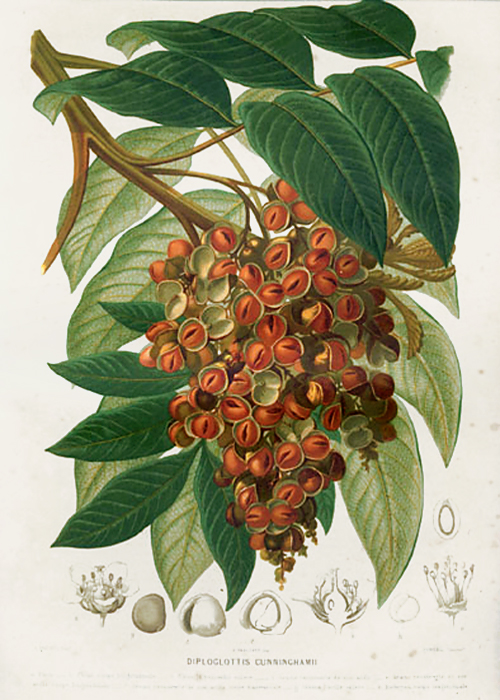
Diploglottis cunninghamii Auguste Faguet Dictionnaire de botanique 1886

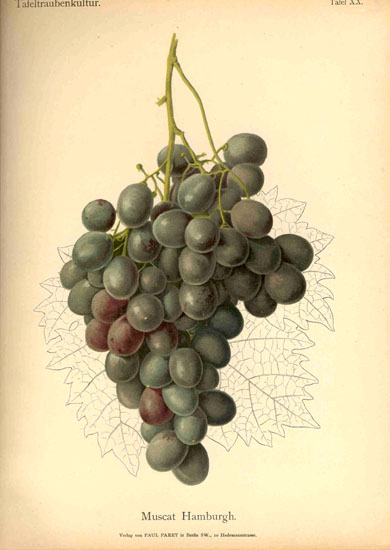
Muscat Hamburgh Handbuch der Tafeltraubenkultur 1895

== 1–100 CE ==
- c. 77 De Materia Medica Dioscorides (40–90 CE)
- Naturalis Historiae Gaius Pliny the Elder (23–79 CE)

== 201-300 ==
- c. 200 – 250 CE Shennong Ben Cao Jing Traditionally attributed to the mythical emperor Shennong

== 301-400 ==
- 4th century Pseudo-Apuleius Herbarius

== 501–600 ==
- 515 Vienna Dioscurides (copy of De Materia Medica made for Juliana Anicia, daughter of Anicius Olybrius)
- 6th century Herbarium, Leiden, MS. Voss. Q.9.

== 1001–1500 ==
- 1090-1120 Saint-Omer Liber Floridus Lambert, Canon of Saint-Omer
- 12th-century Cordoba Kitāb fī l-adwiya al-mufrada Abū Jaʿfar al-Ghāfiqī (?-c1165)
- 1199 Iraq The Book of Theriac (Kitāb al-Diryāq) (Anonymous author)
- 12th- or 13th-century The Book of Simple Medicaments Serapion the Younger
- Early 14th-century Salerno Liber de Simplici Medicina aka Circa Instans Johannes and/or Matthaeus Platearius
- Early 15th-century Italy Voynich manuscript (text in code)
- Early 15th-century Venice Codex Bellunensis (aka Belluno Herbal) (based on the work of Dioscorides)
- c. 1403 Padua Carrara Herbal Anonymous author of incomplete book never published and likely drawing on The Book of Simple Medicaments by Serapion the Younger
- c. 1440 Lombardy Erbario Carrarese
- c. 1450 – c. 1480 Cluny Livre des Simples Medicines Matthaeus Platearius
- c. 1472 Kraków Antibolomenon Jan Stanko (1430–1493)
- 1475 Augsburg He nach volget das Puch der Natur Konrad von Megenberg (1309–1374)
- 1481/83 Italy/Mainz Herbarium Apuleii Platonici Apuleius Platonicus
- 1483 Venice Naturalis Historiae Gaius Pliny the Elder (23–79 CE)
- 1484 Germany Latin Herbarius Peter Schöffer (1425–1502)
- 1485 Germany German Herbarius Peter Schöffer (1425–1502)
- 1486 Augsburg Gart der Gesundheit Peter Schöffer (1425–1502)
- 1491 Mainz Ortus sanitatis de herbis et planti de animalibus Jacob Meydenbach Peter Schöffer (1425–1502)
- 1499 Venice Herbarius Latinus Incipit tractatus de virtutibus herbarum Simone Bevilacqua da Pavia (fl. 1485-1518) Arnau de Vilanova (c1240-c1311)

== 1501–1600 ==
- Early 16th-century Paris Livre des Simples Medicines Matthaeus Platearius Robinet Testard
- 1526 England The Grete Herball
- 1530 Strasbourg Herbarium Vivae Eicones Otto Brunfels (1488–1534), Hans Weiditz
- 1530 Strasbourg Lustgärten und Pflantzungen Christian Egenolff (1502–1555)
- 1534 Kraków O ziołach i o mocy ich Stefan Falimierz
- 1536 Paris De Natura Stirpium Jean Ruel (1474–1537)
- 1539 Strasbourg Kreüter Buch Hieronymus Bock (1498–1554)
- 1542 Basel De Historia Stirpium Commentarii Insignes Leonhart Fuchs (1501–1566) Albrecht Meyer Heinrich Füllmaurer Veit Rudolf Speckle
- 1542 Kraków O ziołach tutecznych i zamorskich i o mocy ich, a k temu księgi lekarskie Hieronim Spiczyński 1500-1553)
- 1544 Venice Commentarii in Sex Libros Pedacii Dioscoridis Pietro Andrea Mattioli (1501–1577)
- 1549 Lyons Plantarum effigies Leonhart Fuchs (1501–1566)
- 1551 London 1562 Cologne A New Herball, Wherein are Conteyned the Names of Herbes William Turner (1508–1568)
- 1552 Mexico Badianus Manuscript aka Libellus de Medicinalibus Indorum Herbis (anonymous Aztec) Juan Badiano (1484-?) Martín de la Cruz
- 1554 Antwerp Cruijdeboeck Rembert Dodoens (1517–1585) Pieter van der Borcht (1535/40-1608) Arnold Nicolai
- 1561 Strasbourg Historia Stirpium Libri IV Conrad Gesner (1516–1565)
- 1562 Prague Herbarz: Ginak Bylinar (Commentaries on Dioscorides) Pietro Andrea Mattioli (1501–1577)
- 1563 Goa Coloquios dos Simples, e Drogas he Cousas Medicinais Garcia de Orta (1501–1568)
- c. 1565 Mattioli's Dioscorides illustrated by Cibo Gherardo Cibo (1512–1600)
- 1566 Antwerp Frumentorum Rembert Dodoens (1517–1585) Pieter van der Borcht (1535/40-1608)
- 1568 Kraków Herbarz, to jest ziół tutecznych, postronnych i zamorskich opisanie Marcin Siennik
- 1568–72 Florilegium in Victoria & Albert Museum Jacques Le Moyne de Morgues (c. 1533 – 1588)
- 1568 Antwerp Florum et Coronarium Odoratarum Rembert Dodoens (1517–1585)
- 1569 Seville Historia Medicinal Indias Occidentales Nicolás Monardes (1493–1588)
- 1570 London Stirpium Adversaria Nova Matthias de Lobel (1538–1616), Pierre Pena
- 1576 Antwerp Plantarum Seu Stirpium Historia Matthias de Lobel (1538–1616)
- 1577 Frankfurt Kreuterbuch. Künstliche Conterfeytunge der Bäume, Stauden Adam Lonicer (1528–1586)
- 1577–87 Florence Botanical Paintings for Francesco I de' Medici, Grand Duke of Tuscany Jacopo Ligozzi (1547–1627)
- 1581 Antwerp Plantarum Seu Stirpium Icones Matthias de Lobel (1538–1616)
- 1583 Florence De Plantis Libri XVI Andrea Cesalpino (1519–1603)
- 1583 Antwerp Stirpium Historiae Pemptades Sex Rembert Dodoens (1517–1585)
- 1585 Rome Herbario nuovo Castore Durante (born 1529)
- 1586 Historia plantarum Lugdunensis Jacques d'Aléchamps (1513–1588) Johannes Molindus Jean Bauhin (1511–1582)
- 1586 Histoire Naturelle des Indes (aka 'Drake manuscript')
- 1592 Venice De Plantis Aegypti liber Prospero Alpini (1553–1617)
- 1592 Naples Phytobasanos cui accessit vita Fabi et Lynceorum Fabio Colonna (1567–1650)
- 1593 Antwerp Florilegium ab Hadriano Collaert Adriaen Collaert (1560–1618)
- 1593 China Bencao Gangmu Li Shizhen (1518–1593)
- 1595 Bijapur Kitab-i hasha’ish (Book of herbs) Created during the reign of Ibrahim Adil Shah II (1580–1627)
- 1595 Kraków Herbarz polski, to jest o przyrodzeniu ziół i drzew rozmaitych Marcin of Urzędów (1500–1573)
- 1597 London Herball John Gerard (1545–1611)

== 1601–1700 ==
- 1600s London The Florilegium of Alexander Marshal Alexander Marshal (c1620-1682) (housed in the Royal Library of Windsor Castle)
- 1600-25 A History of East Indian Trees and Plants and of their Medicinal Properties aka Sloane Manuscript 4013 London, British Library
- 1601 Antwerp Rariorum Plantarum Historia Fungorum Historia Charles de l'Écluse (1526–1609)
- 1605 Leiden Exoticorum Libri Decem Charles de l'Écluse (1526–1609)
- 1608 Paris Le Jardin du roy tres chrestien Louis XIIII roy de France et de Navare Pierre Vallet (c. 1575 – 1657)
- 1611 Antwerp Curae Posteriores Aethiopicum Charles de l'Écluse (1526–1609)
- 1612 Frankfurt Florilegium Novum Theodor de Bry (1528–1598) Johann Theodor de Bry (1561–1623) Matthäus Merian (1593–1650)
- 1612 Frankfurt Florilegium Amplissimum et Selectissimum Emanuel Sweert (1552–1612)
- 1613 Kraków Zielnik Szymon Syreński (1540–1611)
- 1613 Hortus Eystettensis Basilius Besler (1561–1629)
- 1614 Florence Étude de Botanique Girolamo Pini
- 1614–16 Utrecht Hortus floridus Crispijn van de Passe (1564–1637)
- 1615 Hortulus Monheimensis Wolfgang Philippus Brandt
- 1620 Paris Livre de Fleurs François L’Anglois (1859–1647)
- 1620-29 London Tradescant's Orchard John Tradescant the Elder (c. 1570-1638)
- 1623 Basel Pinax Theatri Botanici Caspar Bauhin (1560–1624)
- 1629 Venice De plantis exoticis libri duo Prospero Alpini (1553–1617)
- 1629 London Paradisi in Sole John Parkinson (1567–1650)
- 1631–1793 Paris Les Vélins du Roi Nicolas Robert (1614–1685) Pancrace Bessa (1772–1846) Gerard van Spaendonck (1746–1822) Claude Aubriet (1665–1742) Madeleine Françoise Basseporte (1701–1780)
- 1633 Rome De Florum Cultura Libri IV Giovanni Battista Ferrari (1584–1655)
- 1633 Paris Theatrum florae Daniel Rabel (1578–1637)
- 1635 Paris Canadensium Plantarum, Aliarumque Nondum Editarum Historia Jacques-Philippe Cornut (c1606–1651)
- 1640 London Theatrum Botanicum John Parkinson (1567–1650)
- 1641 Frankfurt-am-Main Florilegium renovatum et auctum: variorum maximeque rariorum germinum, forum ac plantarum Theodor de Bry (1528–1598) Matthäus Merian (1593–1650)
- 1641 Delhi Dara Shikoh Album
- 1644 Paris Recueil des Plantes du Jardin du Roi Guy de la Brosse (1586–1641)
- 1644 Amsterdam Theophrasti Eresii de Historia Plantarum Johannes Bodaeus van Stapel (1602–1636)
- 1646 Rome Hesperides sive de Malorum Aureorum Cultura et Usu Libri Quatuor Giovanni Battista Ferrari (1584–1655), Cassiano dal Pozzo (1588–1657)
- 1648 Leiden Historia Naturalis Brasiliae Willem Piso
- 1649–59 Schleswig-Holstein-Gottorp Gottorfer Codex Hans Simon Holtzbecker (1610–1671)
- 1654-75 Frankfurt Nassau Florilegium Johann Jakob Walther (artist) (1604–1676)
- 1656 Vienna Flora sinensis Michał Piotr Boym (1612–1659) (anonymous artists)
- 1660 Altdorf Florae Altdorffinae Deliciae Hortenses sive Catalogus Plantarum Horti Medici Moritz Hoffmann (1622–1698)
- 1669 London Hortus Regius Blesensis Robert Morison (1620–1683)
- 1670 London Sylva or a Discourse of Forest Trees John Evelyn (1620–1706)
- 1672 Amsterdam Waare Oeffening der Planten Abraham Munting (1626–1683)
- 1672 Oxford Plantarum Umbelliferum Robert Morison (1620–1683)
- 1675 Copenhagen Acta Medica et Philosophica Hafniensia Thomas Bartholin (1616–1680)
- 1675 London Anatome plantarum 2 vols. Marcello Malpighi (1628–1694)
- 1676 Paris Memoires pour servir à l'histoire des plantes Dionys Dodart (1634–1707)
- 1678 Danzig Exoticarum...Plantarum Centuria Prima Jacob Breyne (1637–1697) Stephanus Cousius
- 1678–1703 Amsterdam Hortus Malabaricus Hendrik van Rheede et al. (1636–1691)
- 1679 Nuremberg Der Raupen wunderbare Verwandelung und sonderbare Blumennahrung Maria Sibylla Merian (1647–1717)
- 1680 Amsterdam Aloidarium Historia Abraham Munting (1626–1683)
- 1680 Oxford Historia plantarum universalis Oxoniensis Robert Morison (1620–1683)
- 1682 London Methodus Plantarum Nova John Ray (1628–1705)
- 1682 The Anatomy of Plants Nehemiah Grew (1641–1712)
- 1685 Amsterdam Simon van der Stel's Journal of his expedition in Namaqualand Simon van der Stel (1639–1712)
- 1686 Paris Voyage de Siam Guy Tachard (1651–1712)
- 1686–1709 Amsterdam Moninckx Atlas Jan Moninckx (1656–1714) Maria Moninckx (1673–1757)
- 1687 Leiden Horti Academici Lugduno-Batavi Catalogus Paul Hermann (c. 1646 – 1695)
- 16?? London Codex Comptoniana Henry Compton (1632–1713)
- 16?? Holland Codex Bentingiana Hans Willem Bentinck (1649–1709)
- 16?? Holland Codex Witsenii Nicolaas Witsen (1641–1717)
- 1686–1704 London Historia plantarum generalis John Ray (1628–1705) van Huysum
- 1689 Paris Second Voyage Guy Tachard (1651–1712)
- 1690 The Hague Horti Beaumonti Exoticarum Plantarum Catalogus Franz Kiggelaer (1648–1722)
- 1691 London Phytographia Leonard Plukenet (1642–1706)
- 1693 Paris Description des plantes de l'Amérique Charles Plumier (1646–1704)
- 1694 Paris Eléments de botanique Institutiones Rei Herbariae Joseph Pitton de Tournefort (1656–1708)
- 1696 Leiden Utrecht Naauwkeurige Beschryving der Aardgewassen Abraham Munting (1626–1683)
- 1696 London Almagestum Leonard Plukenet (1642–1706)
- 1696 Brandenburg Index Nominum Plantarum Universalis Christian Mentzel (1622–1701)
- 1697 Amsterdam Horti medici amstelodamensis (vol.1) Jan Commelijn (1629–1692)
- 1698 Leiden Paradisus Batavus Paul Hermann (1646–1695)
- 1700 Nuremberg Flora Noribergensis Johann Georg Volckamer (1662–1744)
- 1700 Paris Institutiones Rei Herbariae Joseph Pitton de Tournefort (1656–1708)
- 1700 Amsterdam Plantae Javanicae pictae, ex Java transmissae anno MDCC Nicolaes Witsen (1641–1717) Herbert de Jager

== 1701–1800 ==
- 1701 Amsterdam Horti medici amstelodamensis (vol.2) Caspar Commelijn (1668–1731)
- 1702–09 London Gazophylacii naturae & Artis Decas I-X James Petiver (1663–1718)
- 1703 Paris Nova Plantarum Americanarum Genera Charles Plumier (1646–1704)
- 1703 Leiden Praeludia botanica Caspar Commelijn (1668–1731)
- 1704 De Plantis & Insectis Quibusdam Rarioribus in Hispania Observatis Johann Philipp Breyne (1680–1764)
- 1705 London Amaltheum Botanicum Leonard Plukenet (1641–1706)
- 1705 Amsterdam Metamorphosis insectorum Surinamensium Maria Sibylla Merian (1647–1717)
- 1706 Horti medici amstelodamensis Planta Rariores et Exoticae Caspar Commelijn (1668–1731)
- 1707–25 London Voyage to the Islands Madera, Barbadoes, Nieves, St. Christophers and Jamaica Hans Sloane (1660–1753)
- 1708-14 Nuremberg Nürnbergische Hesperides (2 vols) Johann Christoph Volkamer (1644–1720)
- 1710 London Botanologia or The English Herbal] William Salmon (1644–1713)
- 1710-33 Edo Chikinsõ (20 vols) Ihei Itõ (1695–1733)
- 1712 Lemgo Amoenitatum Exoticarum Engelbert Kaempfer (1651–1716) Jacob Gole (1660?–1737?) F. W. Brandshagen
- 1713 Amsterdam Phytographia curiosa Abraham Munting (1626–1683) (postumus publication)
- 1714 Paris Icones Plantarum per Galliam, Hispaniam et Italiam Observata ad Vivum Exhibitarum Jacques Barrelier (1606–1673)
- 1716–28 Cambridge Historia Plantarum Succulentarum Richard Bradley (1688–1732)
- 1717 Leiden Musaeum Zeylanicum Paul Hermann (1646–1695)
- 1719 Nuremberg Caput Bonae Spei Hodiernum Peter Kolbe (1675–1726)
- 1720 Leiden Index Altera Plantarum Herman Boerhaave (1668–1739)
- 1721 London A Philosophical Treatise on Husbandry and Gardening Georg Andreas Agricola (1672–1738)
- 1722-35 Beijing Xian'e Changchun Album Giuseppe Castiglione aka Lang Shining 郞世寧 (1688–1766)
- 1723 Florence Catalogus Plantarum Horti Pisani Michelangelo Tilli (1655–1740)
- 1724 London Synopsis Methodica Stirpium Britannicarum Johann Jacob Dillenius (1684–1747)
- 1724 Flora Capensis Johann Philipp Breyne (1680–1764) Jacob Breyne
- 1728–36 London Historia Plantarum Rariorum John Martyn (1699–1768) Jacob van Huysum (1687–1740) William Houstoun G. Sartorys R. Sartorius
- 1728–40 Plantarum minus cognitarum centuria Johann Christian Buxbaum (1693–1730) Johann Georg Gmelin (1709–1755)
- 1730 London Catalogus Plantarum Thomas Fairchild (1667?–1729), Philip Miller (1691–1771)
- 1730–47 London The Natural History of Carolina, Florida, and the Bahama Islands Mark Catesby (1683–1749)
- 1731 London The Gardeners Dictionary Philip Miller (1691–1771)
- 1732 London Hortus Elthamensis Johann Jacob Dillenius (1684–1747)
- 1734–65 Amsterdam Locupletissimi Rerum Naturalium Thesauri Albertus Seba (1665–1736)
- 1735 Leiden Systema naturae Carl Linnaeus (1707–1778)
- 1735 Amsterdam Bibliotheca botanica Carl Linnaeus (1707–1778)
- 1735 Amsterdam Fundamenta Botanica Carl Linnaeus (1707–1778)
- 1736–48 Amsterdam Duidelyke Vertoning - Beschryvingen der Bloemdragende Gewassen Johann Wilhelm Weinmann (1683–1741)
- 1737 Amsterdam Thesaurus Zeylanicus Catalogus Plantarum Africanarum Johannes Burman (1707–1779)
- 1737 Amsterdam Hortus Cliffortianus Carl Linnaeus (1707–1778) Georg Dionysius Ehret (1708–1770) Jan Wandelaar (1690–1759)
- 1737–45 Ratisbon Phytanthoza Iconographia Johann Wilhelm Weinmann (1683–1741)
- 1737–39 London A curious herbal, containing five hundred cuts Elizabeth Blackwell (1700–1758)
- 1738–09 Rariorum Africanarum Plantarum Johannes Burman (1707–1779)
- 1739 St Petersburg Stirpium rariorum in Imperio Rutheno Johannes Amman (1707–1741) Philipp Georg Mattarnovy (1716–1742)
- 1739 Danzig Prodromi fasciculi rariorum plantarum primus et secundus Johann Philipp Breyne (1680–1764)
- 1741–55 Amsterdam Herbarium Amboinense Georg Eberhard Rumphius/Georg Eberhard Rumpf (1627–1702)
- 1742 Oxford Historia muscorum Johann Jacob Dillenius (1684–1747)
- 1747 Stockholm Flora Zeylanica Carl Linnaeus (1707–1778)
- 1748-59 London Plantae et Papiliones Rariores Depictae et Aeri Incisae Georg Dionysius Ehret (1708–1770)
- 1749 Göttingen Opuscula sua Botanica Albrecht von Haller (1708–1777)
- 1750 Historia Plantarum, originally written by Conrad Gessner between 1555 and 1565.
- 1750–73 Plantae selectae Georg Dionysius Ehret (1708–1770) Christoph Jacob Trew
- 1750–73 Nuremberg Herbarium Blackwellianum emendatum Elizabeth Blackwell (1700–1758)
- 1750–86 Nuremberg Hortus Nitidissimus Christoph Jacob Trew Georg Ehret (1708–1770) Barbara Regina Dietzsch (1706–1783)
- 1751–1767 Nuremberg Deliciae Naturae Selectae Georg Wolfgang Knorr (1705–1761)
- 1753 Stockholm Species Plantarum Carl Linnaeus (1707–1778)
- 1754 Stockholm Genera Plantarum Carl Linnaeus (1707–1778)
- 1755 Vienna Philosophia botanica Carl Linnaeus (1707–1778)
- 1755-60 London Figures of the most Beautiful, Useful, and Uncommon Plants described in The Gardeners' Dictionary (2 vols.) Philip Miller (1691–1771)
- 1756-57 London Eden: or, A compleat body of gardening... John Hill (botanist) (1714–1775) Thomas Hale (agriculturist) (?-c1756)
- 1758 Pomologia Fructologia Johann Hermann Knoop
- 1759-65 Edo Ka-i (8 vols) Shimada Mitsufusa Ono Ranzan (1729–1810)
- 1760-72 Vienna Flora Carniolica (2vols) Giovanni Antonio Scopoli (1723–1788)
- 1761–1883 Flora Danica Georg Christian Oeder Michael Rössler (1705–1777) Martin Rössler (1727–1782) et al.
- 1763–64 Paris Familles des Plantes Michel Adanson (1727–1806)
- 1767 Stockholm Descriptiones Plantarum ex Capite Bonae Spei Peter Jonas Bergius (1730–1790)
- 1767 Stockholm Mantissa Plantarum Carl Linnaeus (1707–1778)
- 1767 London Hortus Europae Americanus Mark Catesby (1683–1749)
- 1767–68 Palermo La Natura e Coltura de'Fiori fisicamente esposta in due trattati Filippo Arena (1708–1789) P. M. Camareri
- 1768-69 Heilbronn Dendrographia sive Historiae natvralis de arboribvs et plantis John Jonston (1603–1675) Matthäus Merian (1593–1650)
- 1769–70 London The British Herbal John Edwards (1742–1815)
- 1770–76 Vienna Hortus Botanicus Vindobonensis Nikolaus Joseph Jacquin (1727–1817)
- 1773-78 Paris Histoire universelle du règne végétal, ou nouveau dictionnaire physique et economique Pierre Buchoz (1731–1807)
- 1773–78 Vienna Floræ Austriacæ Nikolaus Joseph Jacquin
- 1774–83 Herbier Artificiel Pierre Buchoz (1731–1807)
- 1775 Paris Histoire des Plantes de la Guyane Françoise Jean Baptiste Christophore Fusée Aublet (1720–1778)
- 1775 Leiden Afbeeldingen van zeldzaame gewassen Nicolaas Meerburgh (1734–1814)
- 1775–76 London Characteres generum plantarum, Johann Reinhold Forster (1729–1798), Georg Forster (1754–1794)
- 1776–83 Paris Flora Parisiensis Pierre Bulliard (1752–1793)
- 1777 Illustrations of the sexual system of Linnaeus John Miller Johann Sebastien Mueller (1715–1790)
- 1777 London Flora Londinensis William Curtis (1746–1799) James Sowerby Sydenham Edwards William Kilburn
- 1779–90 Nuremberg Icones plantarum medicinalium Johannes Zorn (1739–99)
- 1780–95 Herbier de la France Pierre Bulliard (1742–93)
- 1782 Paris Traité des arbres fruitiers Henri-Louis Duhamel du Monceau (1700–1782) Pierre Jean François Turpin (1775–1840)
- 1783–92 Stuttgart Beschreibung und Abbildung der Bäume und Gesträuche, welche im Herzogthum Wirtemberg wild wachsen de:Johann Simon von Kerner (1755–1830)
- 1783–1801 London A Collection of Flowers drawn after Nature John Edwards (1742–1815)
- 1784 Leipzig Flora Japonica Carl Thunberg (1743–1828)
- 1784 Paris Stirpes novae :aut minus cognitae, quas descriptionibus et iconibus Charles Louis L'Héritier de Brutelle (1746–1800) Pierre Joseph Redouté (1759–1840) Louis Fréret (1754–1831) Jean Louis Prévost (1760–1810) Fossier, James Sowerby, Aubriet, Bruguière, Jossigny Henri Joseph Redouté (1766–1852)
- 1785 Stockholm A Voyage to the Cape of Good Hope Anders Erikson Sparrman (1748–1820)
- 1786 Paris Recueil des plantes dessinées et gravées par ordre du roi Louis XIV Nicolas Robert (1614–1685) Abraham Bosse (1602–1676) Louis de Chastillon (1639–1734) Sébastien Le Clerc (1637–1714)
- 1786 Halle Florulae Insularum Australium Prodromus Georg Forster (1754–1794)
- 1786 Nuremberg Hortus nitidissimus Christoph Jacob Trew (1695–1769)
- 1786–89 Stockholm Catalogue of the Museum Carlsonianum Anders Erikson Sparrman (1748–1820)
- 1787 London The Botanical Magazine William Curtis (1746–1799)
- 1787 Paris Cours de botanique Pierre Philippe Alyon (1758–1816)
- 1788 Paris Recueil des Plantes Gravée par Ordre du Roi Louis XIV Dionys Dodart (1634–1707)
- 1788 Paris Cornus :specimen botanicum Charles Louis L'Héritier de Brutelle (1746–1800) Pierre-Joseph Redouté (1759–1840)
- 1788 Paris Monadelphiae classis dissertationes decem Antonio J. Cavanilles
- 1788–94 Vienna Leipzig Plantarum indigenarum et exoticarum icones ad vivum coloratae oder Sammlung nach der Natur gemalter Abbildungen inn- und ausländischer Pflanzen, für Liebhaber und Beflissene der Botanik (8 vols.) Published by 'Lukas Hochenleitter und Kompagnie'
- 1788–93 Stockholm Travels in Europe, Africa and Asia Carl Thunberg (1743–1828)
- 1789 Paris Recueil de plantes coloriees, pour servir a l'intelligence des lettres elementaires sur la botanique Jean-Jacques Rousseau (1712–1778) Nicolas Robert (1614–1685)
- 1789 London A Narrative of Four Journeys into the Country of the Hottentots and Caffraria William Paterson (1755–1810)
- 1789–90 London Botanical Review, or The Beauties of Flora Edward Donovan (1768–1837)
- 1790 London Travels into the Interior Parts of Africa François Le Vaillant (1753–1824)
- 1790 Lisbon Flora Cochinchinensis (4 vols.) João de Loureiro (1717–1791)
- 1790 Plantes grasses Pierre-Joseph Redouté (1759–1840)
- 1790 London Culpeper's English Physician and Complete Herbal Nicholas Culpeper (1616–1654) Ebenezer Sibly (1751–1799) (illustrated edition of Culpeper's 1652 work)
- 1790–92 De Fructibus et Seminibus Plantarum Joseph Gaertner (1732–1791) Johann Georg Sturm (1742–1793)
- 1790–95 Medical Botany William Woodville James Sowerby
- 1790–1813 English Botany Sowerby's Botany James Sowerby James Edward Smith
- 1792-97 'Mushrooms, toadstools and other fungi' (299 plates) Louisa Finch, Countess of Aylesford (1760–1832)
- 1793 Haarlem Icones Plantarum Rariorum
- 1794 London Coloured Engravings of Heaths Henry Cranke Andrews fl.(1794–1830)
- 1794 Uppsala Prodromus Plantarum Capensium Carl Thunberg (1743–1828)
- 1795 Stuttgart Hortus sempervirens exhibens icones plantarum selectiorum... de:Johann Simon von Kerner (1755–1830)
- 1795-1819 London Plants of the Coast of Coromandel William Roxburgh (1751–1815) (anonymous Indian artists)
- 1795-1804 Zürich Tabulae Phytographicae (2 vols.) Johannes Gessner (1709–1790) Christian Gottlieb Geissler (1729–1814)
- 1796 Weimar Der geöffnete Blumengarten August Iohann Georg Carl Batsch
- 1796 Nuremberg Deutschlands Flora in Abbildungen Jacob Sturm (1771–1848) Johann Georg Sturm (1742–1793)
- 1796 London Stapeliae Novae Francis Masson (1741–1805)
- 1797 A Description of the Genus Cinchona Aylmer Bourke Lambert (1761–1842)
- 1797–1804 Vienna Plantarum Rariorum Horti Caesarei Schoenbrunnensis Descriptiones et Icones Nikolaus Joseph von Jacquin (1727–1817)
- 1797–1812 Botanist's Repository Henry Cranke Andrews fl.(1794–1830)
- 1798- s.l. Philippine Islands - Fruits and Flowers s.n.
- 1798 Paris Histoire des champignons de la France Pierre Bulliard (1742–93)
- 1798 Madrid Flora Peruviana, et Chilensis Hipólito Ruiz
- 1798-1823 Hanover Ericarum Icones et descriptiones. Abbildung und Beschreibung der Heiden (26 issues) Johann Christoph Wendland (1755–1828)
- 1798–99 Paris Flora Atlantica :sive historia plantarum quae in Atlante René Louiche Desfontaines (1750–1833) Pierre-Joseph Redouté (1759–1840)
- 1799 London Thirty-eight plates, with explanations Thomas Martyn (1735–1825)
- 1799–1807 Temple of Flora Robert John Thornton (1768–1837) Thomas Medland (1755–1833) Philip Reinagle (1749–1833)
- 1799–1807 Illustrations of the New Sexual System of Carolus von Linnaeus and Temple of Flora Robert John Thornton (1768–1837) Thomas Medland (1755–1833) Philip Reinagle (1749–1833)
- 1799–1837 Plantarum historia succulentarum A. P. de Candolle (1778–1841) Pierre-Joseph Redouté (1759–1840)
- 1800 Paris Description des plantes nouvelles Etienne Pierre Ventenat (1757–1808)
- 1800–22 Vienna Icones Plantarum Medico-Oeconomico-Technologicarum Ferdinand Bernhard Vietz (1772–1815)

== 1801–1900 ==
- 1800–1934 Amsterdam Flora Batava Jan Kops (1765–1849) Jan Christiaan Sepp (1739–1811)
- 1801 Paris Histoire des Chênes de l'Amérique André Michaux (1746–1802) Pierre-Joseph Redouté (1759–1840)
- 1801–09 Vienna Icones et descriptiones Graminum austriacorum Nikolaus Thomas Host
- 1802–12 Vienna Descriptiones et icones plantarum rariorum Hungariae Pál Kitaibel (1757–1817) Franz de Paula Adam von Waldstein (1759–1823) Karl Schutz Johann Schutz
- 1802–15 Paris Les liliacées Redouté (1759–1840) de Candolle François de Laroche Alire Raffeneau-Delile Louis-Jean Allais (1762–1833)
- 1802 Astragalogia, nempe astragali Pierre-Joseph Redouté (1759–1840)
- 1804 Paris Voyage à l’ouest des Monts Alléghanys François André Michaux (1770–1855)
- 1804–12 Pomona Britannica George Brookshaw (1751–1823)
- 1805-19 Collectio plantarum, Sammlung ausländischer und einheimischer Pflanzen (3 vols) Johann Christoph Wendland (1755–1828)
- 1805-37 Berlin Getreue Darstellung und Beschreibung der in der Arzneykunde gebräuchlichen Gewächse (13 vols) Friedrich Gottlob Hayne (1763–1832) Friedrich Guimpel (1774–1839) Peter Haas (1754–1804)
- 1807 Paris Le voyage aux régions equinoxiales du Nouveau Continent, fait en 1799-1804 Alexander von Humboldt (1769–1859) Aimé Bonpland (1773–1858)
- 1807–20 Uppsala Flora Capensis Carl Thunberg (1743–1828)
- 1808 Paris Fleurs et Fruits graveés Pancrace Bessa (1772–1835)
- 1808–27 Paris Flore des Antilles François Richard de Tussac (1751–1837)
- 1809 Vienna Fragmenta botanica Nikolaus Joseph Jacquin
- 1809-20 Berlin Flore portugaise Johann Centurius Graf von Hoffmannsegg (1766–1849) Johann Heinrich Friedrich Link (1767–1851)
- 1810 London Botanical Extracts Or Philosophy of Botany Robert John Thornton (1768–1837)
- 1810–13 Paris Histoire des arbres forestiers de l'Amerique septentrionale André Michaux (1746–1802) François André Michaux (1770–1855) Pierre-Joseph Redouté (1759–1840)
- 1811 London Pomona Herefordiensis Thomas Andrew Knight (1759–1838)
- 1811-16 Vienna Eclogae Plantarum Rariorum aut minus cognitarum quas ad vivum descripsit et iconibus coloratis illustravit Joseph Franz von Jacquin (1766–1839)
- 1812 London The British Flora Robert John Thornton (1768–1837)
- 1812–17 Paris Description des plantes rares cultivees a Malmaison et a Navarre Aime Bonpland (1773–1858) Pierre-Joseph Redouté (1759–1840)
- 1814–27 Paris Herbier général de l'amateur Jean-Claude Michel Mordant de Launay (1750–1816)
- 1815–47 London Edwards's Botanical Register Sydenham Edwards (1768–1819) Sarah Drake (1803–1857) John Bellenden Ker Gawler (c. 1764 – 1842) John Lindley (1799–1865)
- 1816-27 Paris Herbier de l’Amateur de Fleurs (8 vols., 600 plates) Auguste Drapiez (1778–1856)
- 1817 London Groups of flowers George Brookshaw (1751–1823)
- 1817 London Conversations on Botany Sarah Mary Fitton (c1796-1874) Elizabeth Fitton (fl. 1817–1834)
- 1817 Nuremberg Deutschlands Flora In Abbildungen Joseph Sturm (1771–1848)
- 1817–18 Philadelphia Vegetable Materia Medica of the United States William Paul Crillon Barton (1786–1856)
- 1817–19 Philadelphia The North American Sylva François André Michaux (1770–1855)
- 1817–20 Boston American Medical Botany Jacob Bigelow (1787–1879)
- 1817–33 London The Botanical Cabinet Conrad Loddiges & Sons
- 1818 Muscologia William Jackson Hooker (1786–1865) Thomas Taylor
- 1818–20 London Studies of Flowers from Nature Miss Smith
- 1818–20 Musci exotici William Jackson Hooker (1786–1865)
- 1818–22 Paris Histoire Naturelle des Orangers Antoine Risso (1777–1845) Pierre Antoine Poiteau (1766–1854)
- 1819 Paris The North American Sylva François André Michaux (1770–1855)
- 1819–23 London William Farquhar Collection of Natural History Drawings William Farquhar (1774–1839)
- 1820 Paris Études de fleurs et de fruits: Peints d'après nature Henriette Vincent
- 1820-30 London Geraniaceae (five volumes) Robert Sweet (1783–1835) Edwin Dalton Smith (1800–83)
- 1820–46 Paris Icones selectae plantarum Augustin Pyramus de Candolle (1778–1841) Benjamin Delessert (1773–1847) Pierre Jean François Turpin (1775–1840) Jean-Christophe Heyland (1792–1866)
- 1821 London Digitalium Monographia John Lindley (1799–1865) Ferdinand Bauer (1760–1826) William Cattley (1788–1835)
- 1821–23 Philadelphia A Flora of North America William Paul Crillon Barton (1786–1856)
- 1821–24 Paris Phytographie médicale Joseph R. Roques (1772–1850) Edouard Hocquart (1787–1870)
- 1821–26 London Collectanea botanica or Figures and botanical illustrations of rare and curious exotic plants John Lindley (1799–1865)
- 1821–29 Paris Flore Medicale des Antilles] Michel Étienne Descourtilz (1775–1835), Jean-Theodore Descourtilz
- 1823-27 Edinburgh Exotic Flora (3 vols) William Jackson Hooker (1785–1865)
- 1823-29 London The British Flower Garden : coloured figures & descriptions of the most ornamental & curious hardy herbaceous plants Robert Sweet (1823–1829) Edwin Dalton Smith (1800–1883)
- 1823–32 Nova Genera et Species Plantarum Brasiliensium Carl Friedrich Philipp von Martius (1794–1868)
- 1823–50 Leipzig Historia naturalis palmarum Carl Friedrich Philipp von Martius (1794–1868)
- 1824–39 Paris Prodromus Systematis Naturalis Regni Vegetabilis Augustin Pyramus de Candolle (1778–1841) Alphonse de Candolle (1806–1893)
- 1825-1832 Paris Flora Brasiliae Meridionalis (3 vols) Augustin Saint-Hilaire (1779–1853) Pierre Jean François Turpin (1775–1840)
- 1825 Paris Traite des arbrisseaux et des arbustes cultives en France et en pleine terre Jean Henri Jaume Saint-Hilaire (1772–1845)
- 1825 Philadelphia Vegetable Materia Medica of the United States William Paul Crillon Barton (1786–1856)
- 1826 West Chester Florula Cestrica William Darlington (1782–1863)
- 1827 Paris Florae Fluminensis (11 vols) José Mariano de Conceição Vellozo (1742–1811) Francisco Solano (illustrator) Antonio Alvares
- 1827 Icones selectae Plantarum Cryptogamicarum Brasiliensium Carl Friedrich Philipp von Martius (1794–1868)
- 1827–33 Paris Choix Des Plus Belles Fleurs Pierre-Joseph Redouté (1759–1840)
- 1827-38 London Edinburgh The Birds of America John James Audubon (1785–1851) (botanical and ornithological plates)
- 1828 Japan Honzō zufu (Illustrated Manual of Medicinal Plants) Kan'en Iwasaki/Iwasaki Tsunemasa (1786–1842)
- 1828 London The Pomological Magazine John Lindley (1799–1865)
- 1828–32 Paris Flore medicale François-Pierre Chaumeton (1775–1819)
- 1829–40 Flora boreali-americana William Jackson Hooker (1785–1865) David Douglas (1799–1834) John Richardson (naturalist) (1787–1865)
- 1831 London Illustrations and Descriptions of Camellieæ William Chandler Booth (1804–1874) Alfred Chandler (1804–1896) S.Watts Weddell
- 1831–34 London A selection of hexandrian plants, belonging to the natural orders Amaryllidae and Liliacae Priscilla Susan Falkner Bury (1793–1869)
- 1832 London A Description of the Genus Pinus Aylmer Bourke Lambert (1761–1842)
- 1832–43 Oxford British Phaenogamous Botany William Baxter J.H. Parker Whittaker, Treacher and Company
- 1833 Berlin Flora regni Borussici : flora des Königreichs Preussen oder Abbildung und Beschreibung der in Preussen wildwachsenden Pflanzen Albert Gottfried Dietrich (1795–1856) Johann Friedrich Klotzsch (1805–1860)
- 1833–38 Brussels l’Horticulteur belge Louis van Houtte Charles François Antoine Morren Auguste Drapiez Michael Josef Francois Scheidweiler
- 1834-1912 Leipzig "Icones florae Germanicae et Helveticae" (25 vols) Heinrich Gottlieb Ludwig Reichenbach (1793–1879) Heinrich Gustav Reichenbach (1823–1889) Ch. Schnorr
- 1835 Paris Collection de 24 Bouquets de Fleurs Henriette Vincent
- 1835-44 Paris Voyage dans l’Inde pendant les années 1828 à 1832, publié sous les auspices de M. Guizot Victor Jacquemont (1801–1832) Alfred Riocreux (1820–1912) Borromee
- 1835–45 Leipzig Nova genera ac species plantarum, quas in regno Chilensi Peruviano et in terra Amazonica Eduard Friedrich Poeppig (1798–1868), István László Endlicher (1804–1849)
- 1835–48 Leiden Rumphia Carl Ludwig Blume (1796–1862)
- 1836 Paris Turin Histoire naturelle, agricole et economique du maïs Matthieu Bonafous (1793–1852)
- 1836 Paris Flore des Jardiniers, Amateurs et Manufacturiers Pancrace Bessa (1772–1846)
- 1836 London The romance of nature or, the flower-seasons illustrated Louisa Anne Twamley Meredith (1812–1895)
- 1836–50 Paris Histoire naturelle des Iles Canaries Philip Barker Webb (1793–1854) Sabin Berthelot (1794–1880) Jean-Christophe Heyland (1792–1866)
- 1836-55 Jena Flora von Thüringen Jonathan Carl Zenker (1799–1837) Diederich Franz Leonhard von Schlechtendal (1797–1866) Christian Eduard Langethal (1806–1878) Ernst Schenk (1796–1859) (illustrator) =? Friedrich Ernst August Schenk
- 1836–76 Icones Plantarum William Jackson Hooker (1785–1865) Walter Hood Fitch (1817–1892) Matilda Smith (1854–1926)
- 1837–38 London Sertum Orchidaceum John Lindley (1799–1865) Sarah Drake (1803–1857) M. Gauci
- 1837–41 Amsterdam The Orchidaceae of Mexico and Guatemala James Bateman (1811–1897) Walter Hood Fitch (1817–1892) Sarah Drake (1803–1857) Mrs Withers M. Gauci
- 1837-53 Brussels Dictionnaire classique des sciences naturelles (10 vols) Pierre Auguste Joseph Drapiez (1778–1856) Jean Baptiste Geneviève Marcellin Bory (1778–1846)
- 1837–59 Turin Flora Sardoa Giuseppe Giacinto Moris (1796–1869)
- 1838-50 Madras Illustrations of Indian Botany Robert Wight (1796–1872)
- 1838-53 Madras Icones plantarum Indiae Orientalis (6vols.) Robert Wight (1796–1872) Illustrations mainly by Indian artists Rungiah and Govindoo
- 1839 Paris Iconographie du genre Camellia Lorenzo Berlèse (1784–1863)
- 1840 Die Natzlichen Und Schadlichen Schwamme Harald Othmar Lenz (1799–1870)
- 1840 St. Petersburg Illustrationes algarum in itinere c. orbem jussu Imperatoris Nicolai I Alexander Philipov Postels (1801–1871) Franz Joseph Ruprecht (1814–1870)
- 1840–1906 Munich Flora Brasiliensis Carl Friedrich Philipp von Martius (1794–1868) et al.
- 1841-44 Berlin Icones plantarum rariorum horti regii botanici Berolinensis Johann Heinrich Friedrich Link (1767–1851) Johann Friedrich Klotsch (1805–1860) Christoph Friedrich Otto (1783–1856) Carl Friedrich Schmidt (1811–1890)
- 1841–47 Iconographie descriptive des cactees Charles Antoine Lemaire Dumenil Maubert
- 1842-57 Paris Illustrationes Plantarum Orientalium (5 vols) Hippolyte François Jaubert (1798–1874) Édouard Spach (1801–1879)
- 1842-50 London Plantae Utiliores Gilbert Thomas Burnett (1800–1835) Mary Ann Burnett
- 1843 A Flora of the State of New York John Torrey
- 1843 London Paxton's magazine of botany Joseph Paxton (1803–1865)
- 1843–46 Paris Flore d’Amérique dessinée d’après nature sur les lieux Etienne Denisse (fl. 1814–1845)
- 1844 London Sertum Plantarum Henry Borron Fielding (1805–1851) Mary Fielding (1804–1895)
- 1844–1859 London Flora Antarctica or The Botany of the Antarctic Voyage of H.M. Discovery Ships Erebus and Terror in the years 1839–1843, under the Command of Captain Sir James Clark Ross Joseph Dalton Hooker (1817–1911)
  - Part I Flora of Lord Auckland and Campbell's Islands (1843–45)
  - Part II Flora of Fuegia, the Falklands, Kerguellen's land, etc (1845–47)
  - Part III Flora of New Zealand (1851–53) (2 vols)
  - Part IV Flora of Tasmania (1853–59) (2 vols)
- 1844–73 Prodromus Systematis Naturalis Regni Vegetabilis Alphonse Pyrame de Candolle (1805–1893)
- 1845–83 Ghent Flore des Serre Louis van Houtte (1810–1876) Charles Antoine Lemaire (1800–1871) Michael Josef Francois Scheidweiler (1799–1861)
- 1846 Madras Spicilegium Neilgherrense (Plants of the Nilgiri Hills) Robert Wight (1796–1872)
- 1847-52 Turin Flora medico-farmaceutica Felice Cassone (1815–1854)
- 1848 Jena Hand-atlas sämmtlicher medicinisch-pharmaceutischer gewächse Wilibald Artus (1811–1880) F. Kirchner (engraver)
- 1848–60 Ghent Nouvelle Iconographie des Camellias Ambroise Verschaffelt Bernard Léon
- 1849 New York A Forget-Me-Not. Flowers from nature Clarissa Munger Badger
- 1849 Paris Histoire Naturelle des quinquinas, ou monograph du genre Cinchona Hugh Algernon Weddell (1819–1877)
- 1849–51The Rhododendrons of Sikkim-Himalaya Joseph Dalton Hooker (1817–1911) Walter Hood Fitch (1817–1892)
- 1849–57 London Illustrations of South American Plants John Miers (1789–1879)
- 1850–52 Brussels Album de pomologie Alexandre Joseph Désiré Bivort (1809–1872)
- 1850–52 London Paxton’s Flower Garden John Lindley (1799–1865) Joseph Paxton (1803–1865)
- 1851 A Century of Orchidaceous Plants William Jackson Hooker(1785–1865) Walter Hood Fitch (1817–1892)
- 1851 Prague Beschreibung und Cultur Orchideen F Josst
- 1851–52 Paris Jardin Fleuriste Charles Antoine Lemaire (1800–1871) Jean-Christophe Heyland (1792–1866)
- 1851-85 Liège Belgique horticole, journal des jardins et des vergers (1851–1885) Charles Morren (1807–1858) Édouard Morren (1833–1886)
- 1852–53 London Flora Homoeopathica Edward Hamilton (1815–1903)
- 1852-62 Leipzig Icones et descriptiones plantarum novarum criticarum et rariorum Europae Austro-Occidentalis praecipue Hispaniae Heinrich Moritz Willkomm (1821–1895)
- 1852-1904 Berlin ‘Gartenflora, Zeitschrift für Garten- und Blumenkunde (53 vols., 1557 plates) Eduard August von Regel (1815–1892)
- 1853 Paris Gramineae Chilenses Émile Desvaux
- 1853 London Palm trees of the Amazon and their uses Alfred Russel Wallace (1823–1913) Walter Hood Fitch (1817–1892)
- 1853 Vienna Pflanzen Blumen und Blätter Alois Auer (fl. 1840s-1850s)
- 1853–60 Annales de pomologie belge et étrangère Alexandre Joseph Désiré Bivort (1809–1872) Séraph Bavay
- 1853–60 Flora of New Zealand, Flora of Tasmania Joseph Dalton Hooker (1817–1911) Walter Hood Fitch (1817–1892)
- 1854 Amsterdam Handboek tot de Kennis, Voortkweeking van Cactus-soorten J. J. Krook
- 1854–60 Pescatorea Jean Jules Linden (1817–1898) François De Tollenaere Maubert
- 1854–96 Belgium L'Illustration Horticole Journal Special Des Serre et Des Jardins Charles Antoine Lemaire (1800–1871) Jean Jules Linden (1817–1898) Verschaffelt
- 1855 Illustrations of Himalayan Plants Joseph Dalton Hooker (1817–1911) Walter Hood Fitch (1817–1892)
- 1855–57 Paris Chloris andina : essai d'une flore de la région alpine des Cordillères de l'Amérique du Sud Hugh Algernon Weddell (1819–1877)
- 1855–56 Physiotypia Plantarum Austriacarum der Naturselbstdruck Constantin von Ettingshausen (1826–1897)
- 1857 The Ferns of Great Britain and Ireland Thomas Moore (1821–1887) Henry Bradbury (1831–1860)
- 1858 Leiden Florae Javae et insularum adjacentium Carl Ludwig Blume (1796–1862)
- 1858–1900 Leipzig Xenia Orchidacea. Beiträge zur Kenntniss der Orchideen Heinrich Gustav Reichenbach (1823–1889) Friedrich Wilhelm Ludwig Kraenzlin (1847–1934)
- 1859 Dublin Thesaurus Capensis or Illustrations of the South African Flora William Henry Harvey (1811–1866)
- 1859 Nice Les Champignons De La Province De Nice Jean-Baptiste Barla (1817–1896)
- 1859 New York Wild Flowers Drawn and Colored from Nature Clarissa Munger Badger
- 1859 Nature-Printed British Ferns Henry Bradbury (1831–1860)
- 1859–60 The Nature-printed British Sea-weeds Henry Bradbury (1831–1860)
- 1859–60 Hortus Lindenianus Jean Jules Linden (1817–1898)
- 1860 Brussels Pescatorea :iconographie des orchidees Jean Jules Linden (1817–1898)
- 1860s Iconographie des orchidées du Brésil João Barbosa Rodrigues (1842–1909)
- 1860 London Outlines Of British Fungology Miles Joseph Berkeley (1803–1889)
- 1861 South Australia Wild flowers of South Australia Fanny Elizabeth de Mole (1835–1866)
- 1862 Berlin Die Botanischen Ergebnisse der Reise seiner königl. Hoheit des Prinzen Waldemar von Preussen in den Jahren 1845 und 1846 Johann Friedrich Klotzsch (1805–1860) Christian August Friedrich Garcke (1819–1904) Werner Hoffmeister (1819–1845)
- 1862-64 Madrid Album de la flora médico-farmacéutica é industrial, indígena y exótica Vicente Martin de Argenta (1829–1896)
- 1862–65-91 London Select Orchidaceous Plants Robert Warner (botanist) (1814–1896) Benjamin Samuel Williams (1824–1890) Walter Hood Fitch (1817–1892) James Andrews
- 1863 London Handbook of British Mosses Miles Joseph Berkeley (1803–1899) Walter Hood Fitch (1817–1892)
- 1863 Vienna Beiträge zur Morphologie und Biologie der Familie der Orchideen JG Beer
- 1863–84 London Pinetum Britannicum Edward James Ravenscroft (1816–1890)
- 1864–74 A Monograph of Odontoglossum James Bateman Walter Hood Fitch (1817–1892)
- 1865 Handbook of the British Flora George Bentham (1800–1884) William Jackson Hooker (1786–1865) Walter Hood Fitch (1817–1892)
- 1866 Paris Icones Euphorbiarum ou figures de cent vingt-deux espèces du Genre Euphorbia Pierre Edmond Boissier (1810–1885) Jean-Christophe Heyland (né Kumpfler) (1792–1866)
- 1866 Vienna Botanische Ergebnisse der Reise Seiner Majestät des Kaisers von Mexico Maximilian I. nach Brasilien (1859-60) Heinrich Wawra (1831–1887)
- 1866-95 Paris "Histoire des plantes" Henri Baillon (1827–1895) Auguste Faguet (1841–1886) Thiebault (1866–95 fl.)
- 1867 London A Second Century of Orchidaceous Plants James Bateman (1811–1897) Walter Hood Fitch (1817–1892)
- 1867 New York Floral Belles from the Green-House and Garden Clarissa Munger Badger
- 1868 Nice Flore illustrée de Nice et des Alpes-Maritimes JB Barla
- 1868 Massachusetts Autumnal Leaves Ellen Robbins (1828–1905)
- 1868 Montreal Canadian Wild Flowers (1868) Catharine Parr Traill (1802–99) Agnes Dunbar Moodie Fitzgibbon (1833–1913)
- 1868-74 London The Florist and Pomologist Thomas Moore (1821–1887) William Paul (1822–1905)
- 1869-1903 Paris Icones ad floram Europae novo fundamento instaurandam spectantes (3 vols) Claude Thomas Alexis Jordan (1814–1897) Jules Pierre Fourreau (1844–1871)
- 1870-72 Paris Le Règne végétal Pierre Oscar Réveil (1821–1865) François Hérincq (1820–1891) Édouard Maubert (1806–1879)
- 1871 London Handbook Of British Fungi Mordecai Cubitt Cooke (1825–1914)
- 1871–1905 Leiden Musée botanique de Leide Willem Frederik Reinier Suringar (editor) A. J. Kouwels A. J. Wendel
- 1872 Paris Flore forestière : illustrée arbres et arbustes du centre de l'Europe Charles de Kirwan (1829–1917)
- 1873–76 Vienna Atlas der für den Weinbau Deutschlands und Österreichs Rudolf Goethe (1843–1911)
- 1874 London A monograph of Odontoglossum James Bateman (1811–1897) Walter Hood Fitch (1817–1892)
- 1875–94 Sydney Australian Orchids Robert D. FitzGerald (1830–1892) Charles Potter A. J.Stopps
- 1876 Braunschweig Repräsentanten einheimischer Pflanzenfamilien Carl Bollmann Hermann Zippel

- 1876–92 Paris Dictionnaire de botanique Henri Ernest Baillon (1827–1895) Auguste Faguet (1841–1886)
- 1877–80 Monograph of the Genus Lilium Henry John Elwes (1846–1922) Walter Hood Fitch (1817–1892)
- 1877–83 Manila Flora de Filipinas Francisco Manuel Blanco (1778–1845), Lorenzo Guerrero, Regino Garcia y Basa, Fabian Domingo, C. Arguelles, J. Garcia, Rosendo Garcia, Felix Martinez
- 1878 London Familiar Indian flowers Lena Lowis (1845–1919)
- 1879–88 London Biologia Centrali-Americana Frederick DuCane Godman (1834–1919) Osbert Salvin (1835–1898) William Botting Hemsley (1843–1924)
- 1880 London Illustrations of the British flora Walter Hood Fitch (1817–1892), Worthington George Smith (1835–1917)
- 1880 Paris Les Orchidées. Histoire Iconographique ED de Puydt
- 1880 Brussels Fleurs, fruits et feuillages choisis de l'ille de Java Berthe Hoola van Nooten
- 1881–93 L'Orchidophile; Journal des Amateurs d'Orchidées A. Godefroy-Lebeuf Guillaume Severeyns F. Stroobant Jeanne Koch.
- 1882–83 Berlin Deutsche Pomologie Wilhelm Lauche
- 1882–97 London The Orchid Album Robert Warner (botanist) Thomas Moore (1821–1887) John Nugent Fitch (1840–1927) Benjamin Samuel Williams (1824–1890)
- 1883-1914 Gera Köhler's Medizinal-Pflanzen Hermann Adolph Köhler (1834–79) Walther Otto Müller (1833–1887) C.F. Schmidt K. Gunther
- 1885 Gera Flora von Deutschland, Österreich und der Schweiz Otto Wilhelm Thomé (1840–1925)
- 1885 London Orchids the Royal Family of Plants HS Miner
- 1885 Ottawa Studies of Plant Life in Canada Catharine Parr Traill (1802–1899) Agnes Chamberlin (1833–1913)
- 1885–94 Brussels Iconographie des Orchidées Jean Jules Linden (1817–1898) Lucien Linden Pieter De Pannemaeker Em. Rodigas R. A. Rolfe
- 1885–1906 Ghent Lindenia : Iconographie des Orchidées (17 vols) Jean Jules Linden (1817–1898) Lucien Linden
- 1887-91 Leipzig Pflanzenleben Anton Kerner von Marilaun (1831–1898)
- 1887–94 London A Manual of Orchidaceous Plants Harry James Veitch (1840–1924)
- 1888 Argenteuil Les Cypripediées A. Godefroy-Lebeuf and Brown
- 1888–94 London Reichenbachia: Orchids Illustrated and Described Henry Frederick Conrad Sander (1847–1920) Henry George Moon (1857–1905) Walter Hood Fitch (1817–1892)
- 1890 Boston The Silva of North America Charles Sprague Sargent (1841–1927) Charles Edward Faxon (1846–1918)
- 1890 Stuttgart Illustriertes Handbuch der Kakteenkunde Anton Daul
- 1891 Washington Plates 1849-1859 to Accompany a Report on the Forest Trees of North America Asa Gray (1810–1888)
- 1891-93 Paris Atlas des plantes de France (3 vols.) Amédée Masclef (1858–?)
- 1892 Braunschweig Ausländische Kulturpflanzen in farbigen Wandtafeln mit erläuterndem Text Carl Bollmann Hermann Zippel
- 1893 Kyoto One Hundred Chrysanthemums Keika Hasegawa
- 1893–1913 London Icones Orchidearum Austro-Africanarum extra-tropicarum Harry Bolus (1834–1911)
- 1894 Boston Forest Flora of Japan Charles Sprague Sargent (1841–1927) Charles Edward Faxon (1846–1918)
- 1894 Aepfel und Birnen Rudolf Goethe (1843–1911) Hermann Degenkolb Reinhard Mertens
- 1894 Brussels Les Orchidées Exotiques et leur culture en Europe Lucien Linden Alfred Cogniaux (1841–1916) G Grignan
- 1894 London The Orchid Grower's Manual Benjamin Samuel Williams (1824–1890)
- 1895 Berlin Handbuch der Tafeltraubenkultur Rudolf Goethe (1843–1911) Wilhelm Lauche
- 1895 Berlin Die pflanzenwelt Ost-Afrikas Adolf Engler (1844–1930)
- 1896 London The genus Masdevallia Florence H Woolward (1854–1936) Friedrich Carl Lehmann
- 1896–1907 Brussels Dictionnaire Iconographique des Orchidees Alfred Cogniaux (1841–1916) Alphonse Goossens
- 1897–98 Washington Student's Hand-Book Of Mushrooms Of America Edible And Poisonous Thomas Taylor (1820–1910)
- 1898 Leipzig Botanisches Bilderbuch für Jung und Alt Franz Bley
- 1898–1912 Durban Natal Plants John Medley Wood (1827–1914), Maurice Smethurst Evans (1854–1920), Frieda Lauth (1879–1949), Millicent Franks (1886–1961), Walter Jacques Haygarth (1862–1950)
- 1911 Stuttgart Hoffmann-Dennert botanischer Bilderatlas Eberhard Dennert (1861–1942)

== See also ==
- Treatise on Herbs
