= Edward James Ravenscroft =

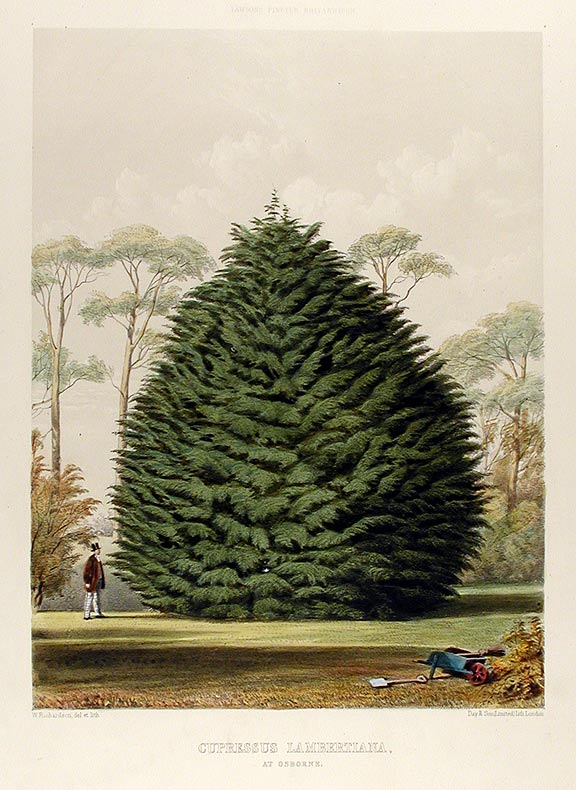
Cupressus lambertiana The Pinetum Britannicum

Edward James Ravenscroft (1816–1890), was the author of The Pinetum Britannicum (1884), a monumental three-volume work that describes and depicts exotic coniferous trees cultivated in Britain in the 19th century, when they were at the height of popularity.

The work is illustrated with William Richardson's hand-coloured lithographs of trees shown in their native habitat or under cultivation in British gardens. The Pinetum Britannicum is regarded as a landmark publication on conifers, and both Napoleon III and Queen Victoria subscribed to its first edition.

== Publication details ==
Ravenscroft, Edward James (1816–1890). The Pinetum Britannicum, a descriptive account of hardy coniferous trees cultivated in Great Britain. Edinburgh and London: Ballantyne, Hanson & Co., for W. Blackwood & Sons, [1863]–1884. Hand-coloured lithographic plates by William Richardson, James Black, R.K. Greville, and J. Wallace, lithographed by A. Murray, Robert Black, Fr. Schenk, J. M'Nab and M.T. Masters, 4 mounted albumen photographs by F. Mason, one lithographic plate of maps, and numerous wood-engraved text illustrations

This botanist is denoted by the author abbreviation Ravenscr. when citing a botanical name.
