= Girolamo Pini =

Italian painter

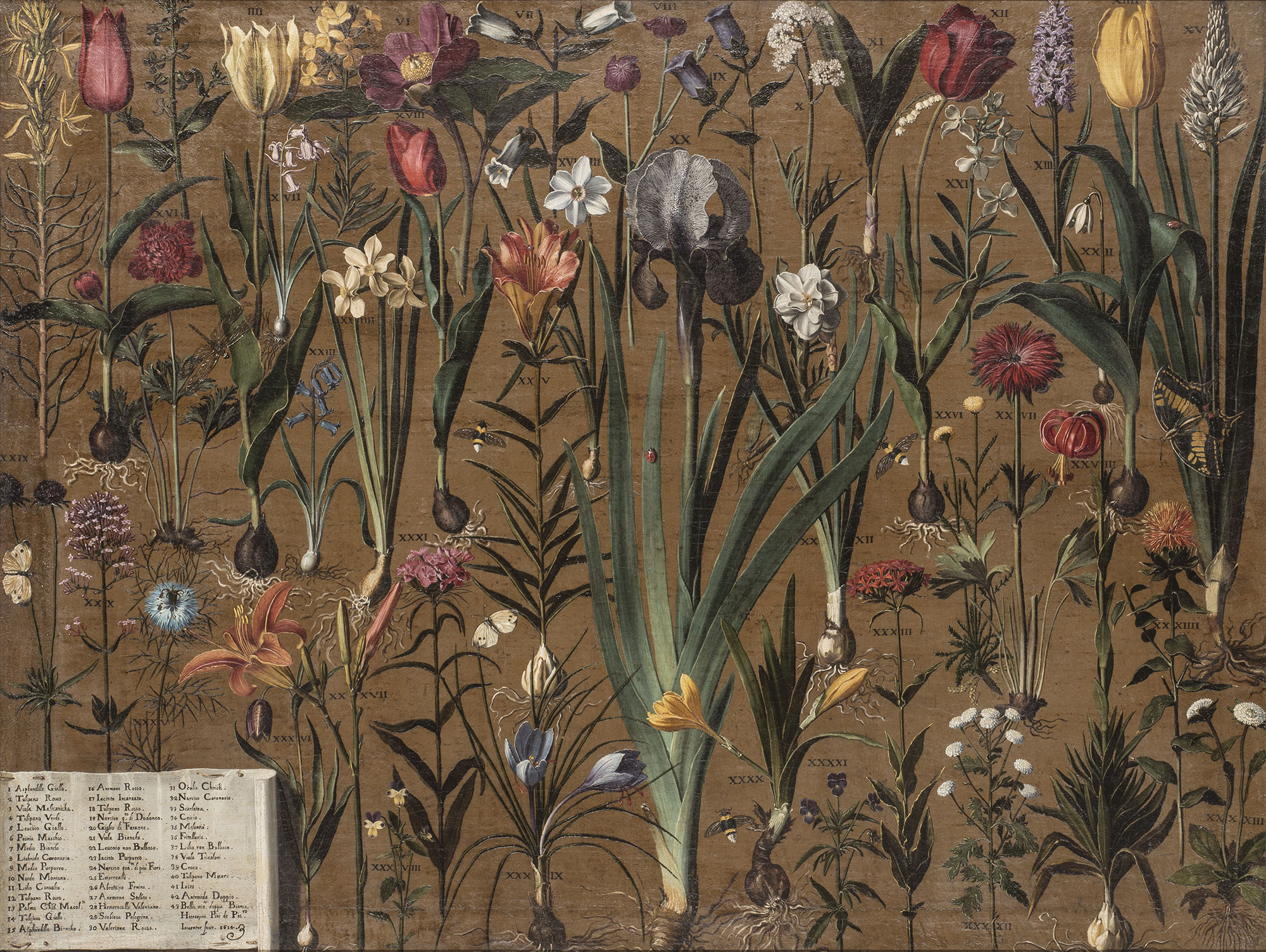

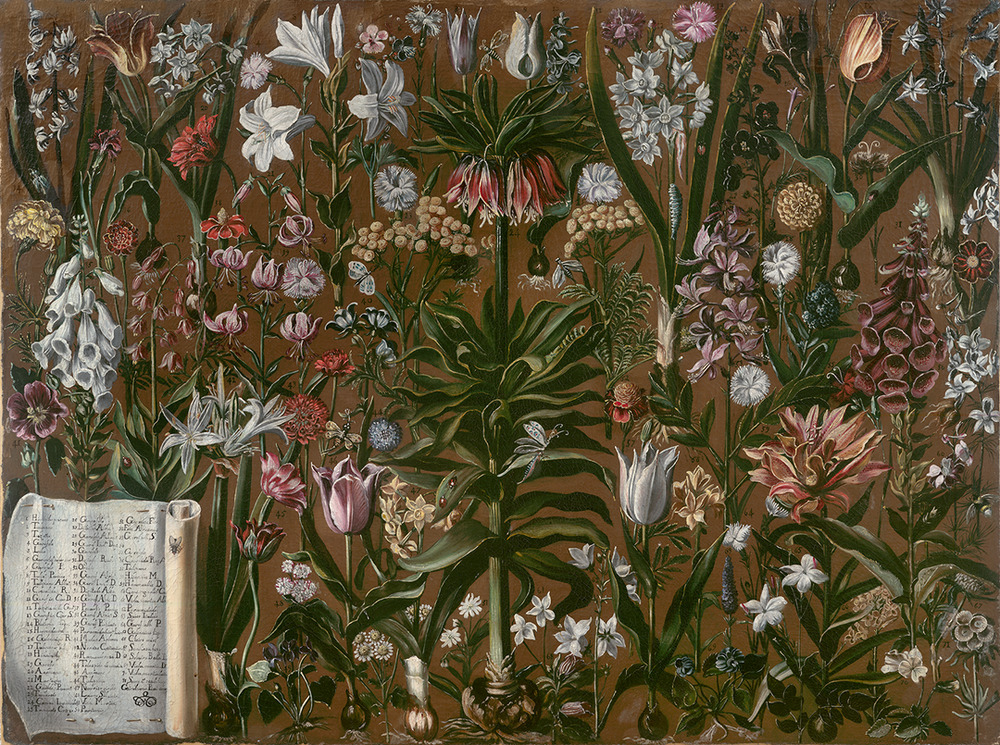

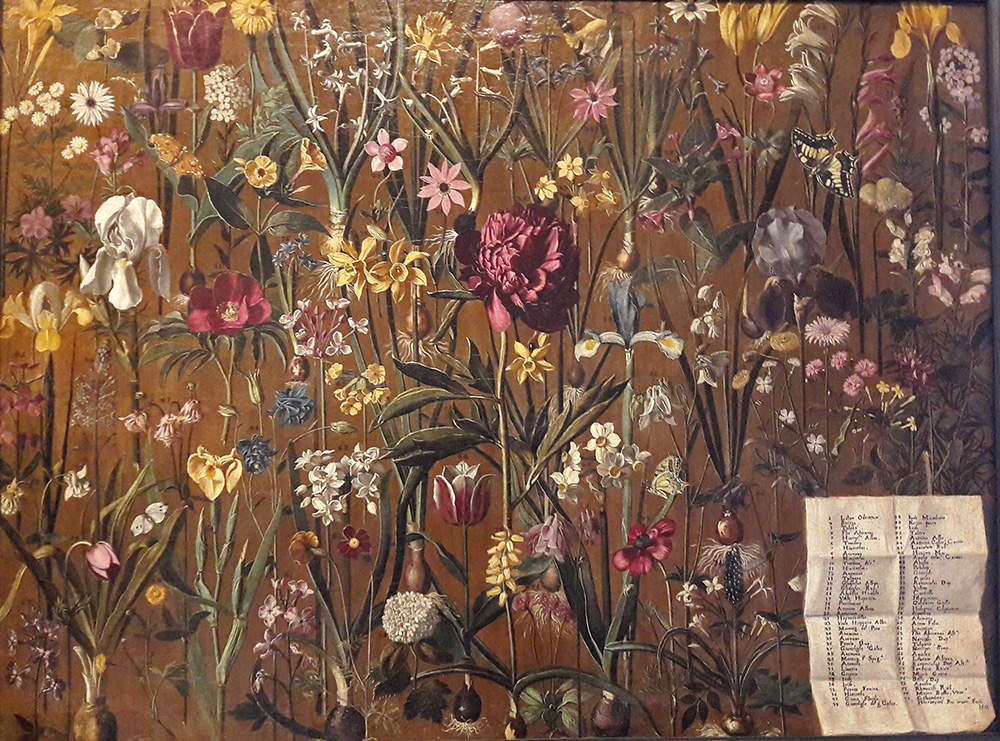

Girolamo Pini was a 17th-century Italian painter from Florence, possibly a pupil of Jacopo Ligozzi, and who produced a number of botanical panels ('Étude de Botanique'), using oils on canvas. Three such panels are housed at the Museum of Decorative Arts in Paris. Painted in the corner of each panel in the form of a scroll or creased sheet of paper, is a list of the plants depicted.

Most of the species depicted are bulbous plants and are meticulously detailed, together with the occasional insect. Being patronised by the Medici family, Pini doubtless found his specimens for illustration from the gardens of Villa di Castello which is just north of Florence, and was the brainchild of Cosimo I de' Medici (1519–74). Two other gardens founded by the Medici and renowned for their scientific interest are those at Pisa and Padua.
