= Wilibald Artus =

Author of a botanical work for pharmacists

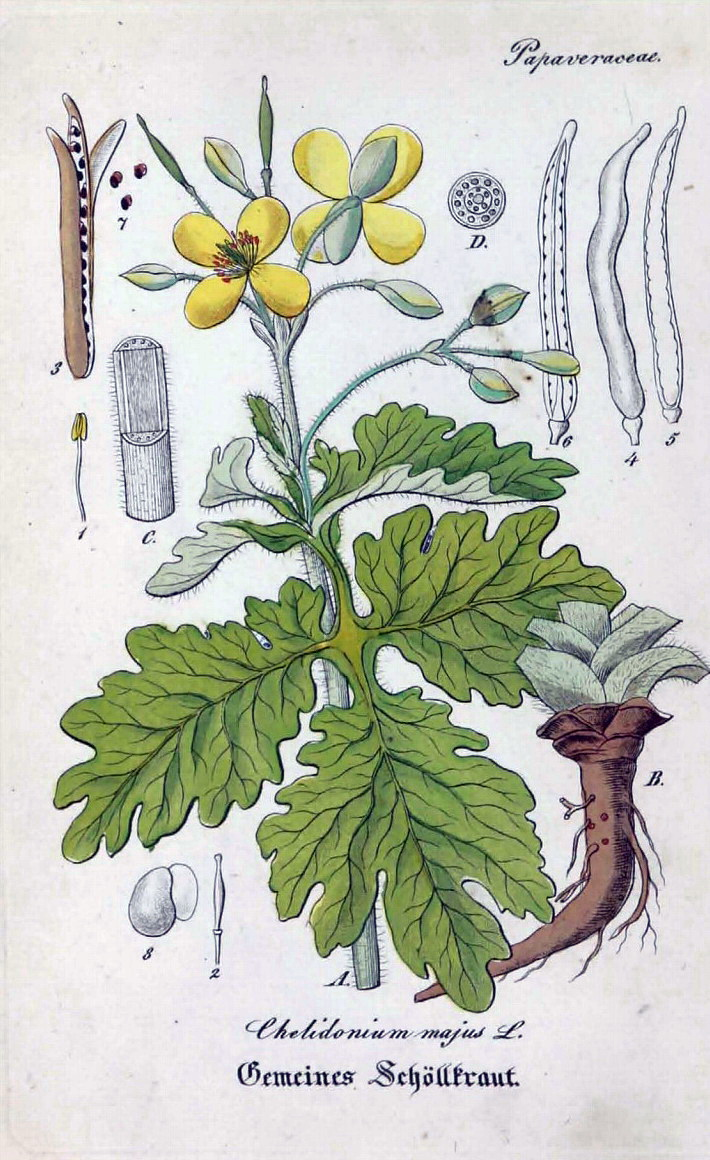
Chelidonium majus L.

Wilibald Artus (1811 – 7 February 1880) was a professor of philosophy at the University of Jena and editor of the Allgemeine Pharmaceutische Zeitschrift. He is noted for his work Hand-Atlas sammtlicher medicinisch-pharmaceutischer Gewachse (1848) with engravings by F. Kirchner. This botanical work was intended for use by pharmacists, doctors and druggists.
