= Regino Garcia =

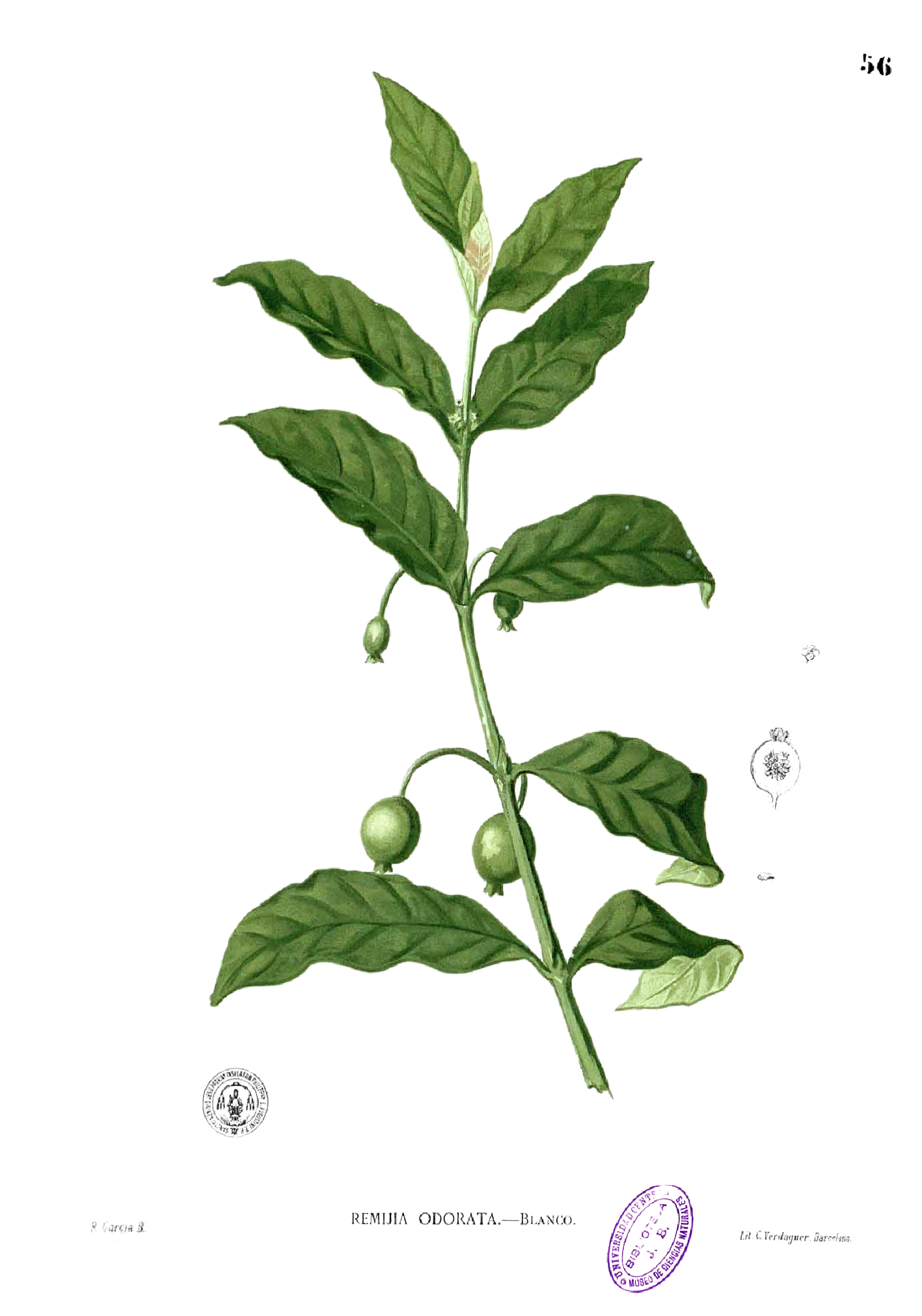
Aidia densiflora Flora de Filipinas Regino García y Basa

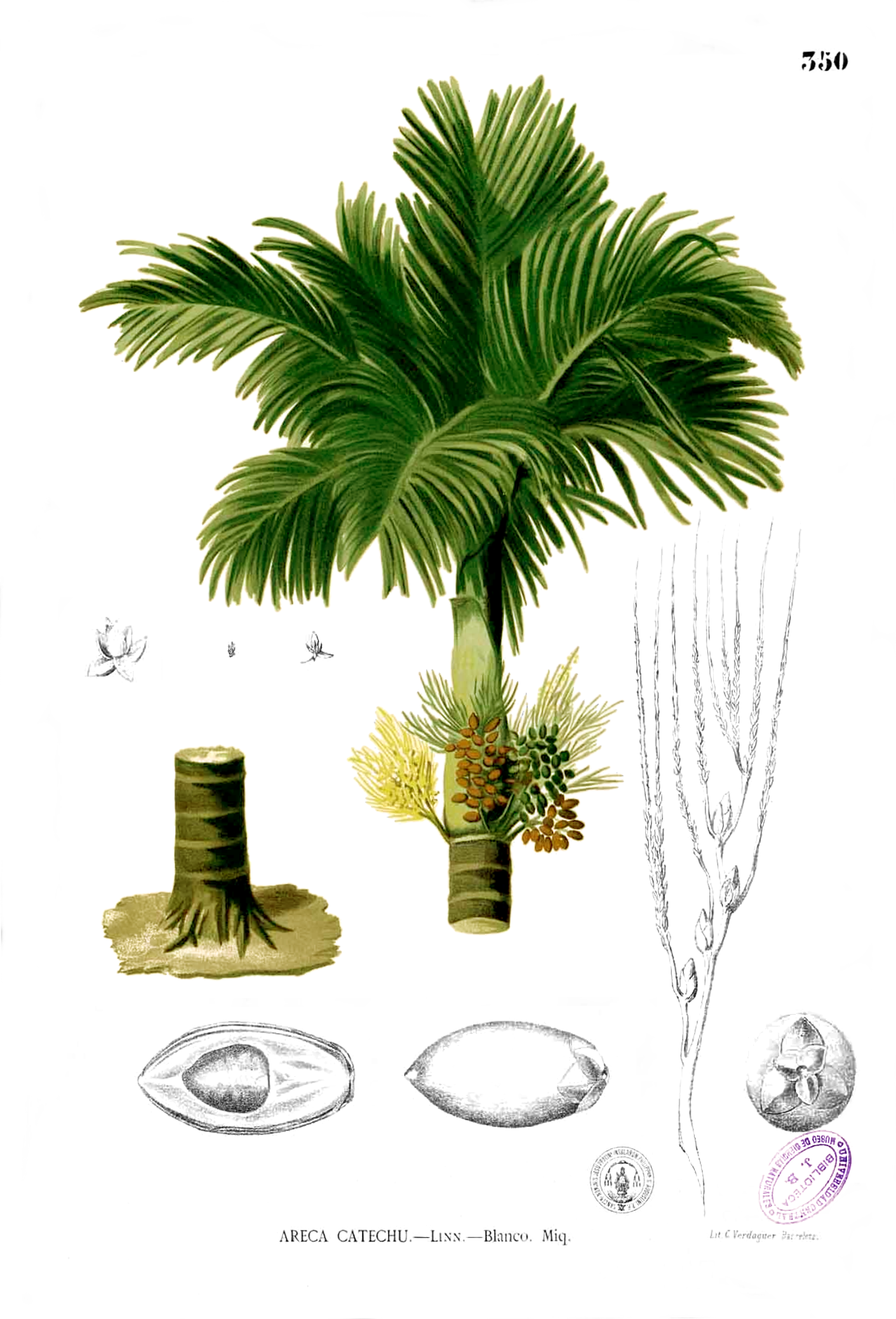
Areca catechu Flora de Filipinas

Regino García y Basa (11 June 1840 – 16 July 1916) was a Filipino artist, botanist and forester. He was also a printing instructor at the University of Santo Tomas and director of walks, gardens and parks for Manila. He is noted for being one of the botanical illustrators who produced plates for Francisco Manuel Blanco's Flora de Filipinas, the illustrated version of which was published in Manila between 1877 and 1883.
