= Gottorfer Codex =

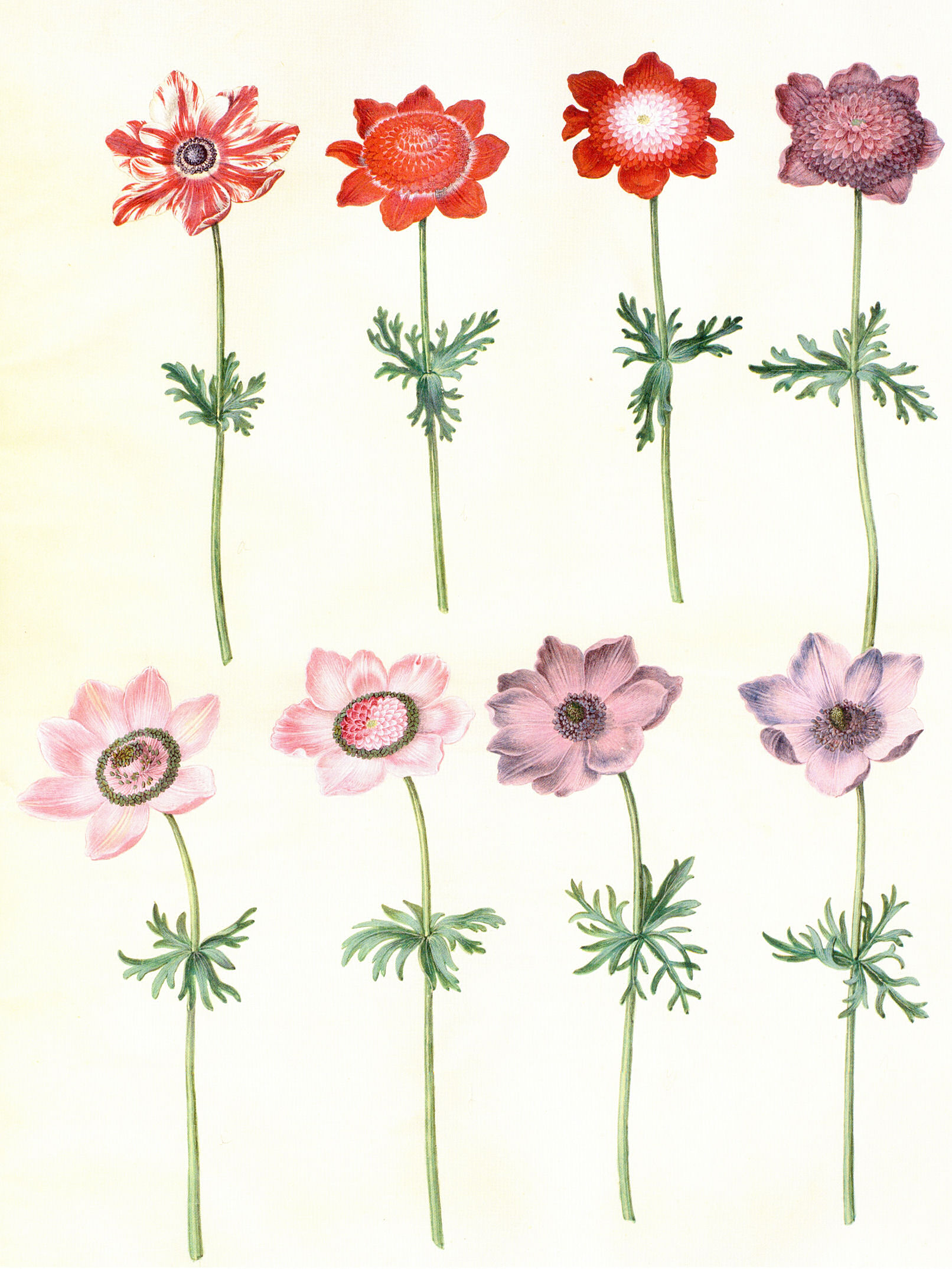
Anemones in the work

Gottorfer Codex at the Statens Museum for Kunst

The Gottorfer Codex (German) or det gottorpske kodeks (Danish) is a four volume work commissioned by Frederick III, Duke of Holstein-Gottorp between 1649 and 1659 to depict the wide assortment of plants that grew in the ducal gardens at Gottorf Castle (Gottorp) in the duchy of Schleswig.

The work's 365 illustrated pages depict 1,180 plants painted in gouache on veal parchment by Hans Simon Holtzbecker from Hamburg. The number of illustrations per page range from one to ten.

Work on the codex stopped after the death of Duke Frederick III in 1659. The codex has been the property of the Danish state since the Great Northern War (1700-1721) when Gottorf Castle and the duke's portion of the duchy of Schleswig were annexed to the Danish crown.

The codex is currently owned by Royal Collection of Graphic Art, a part of the National Gallery of Denmark.

== Digital version ==
In 2009, a digital version of the codex was created by the National Gallery of Denmark with financial support by the Foundation of State Museums in Schleswig-Holstein.
