= Franz Bley =

German botanist and illustrator (1874–1943)

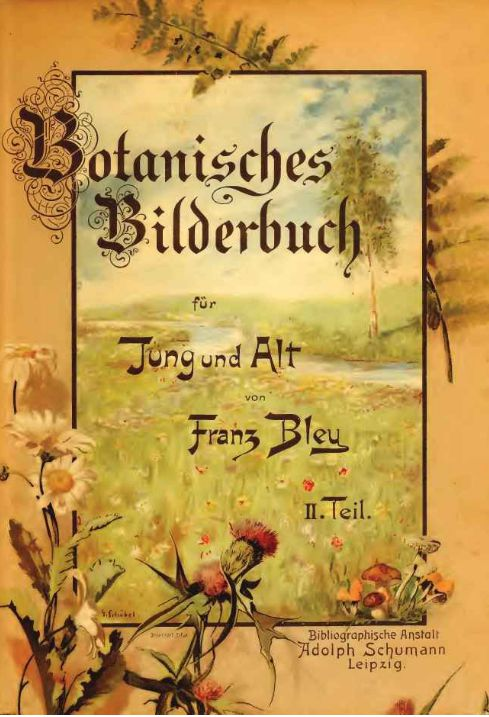

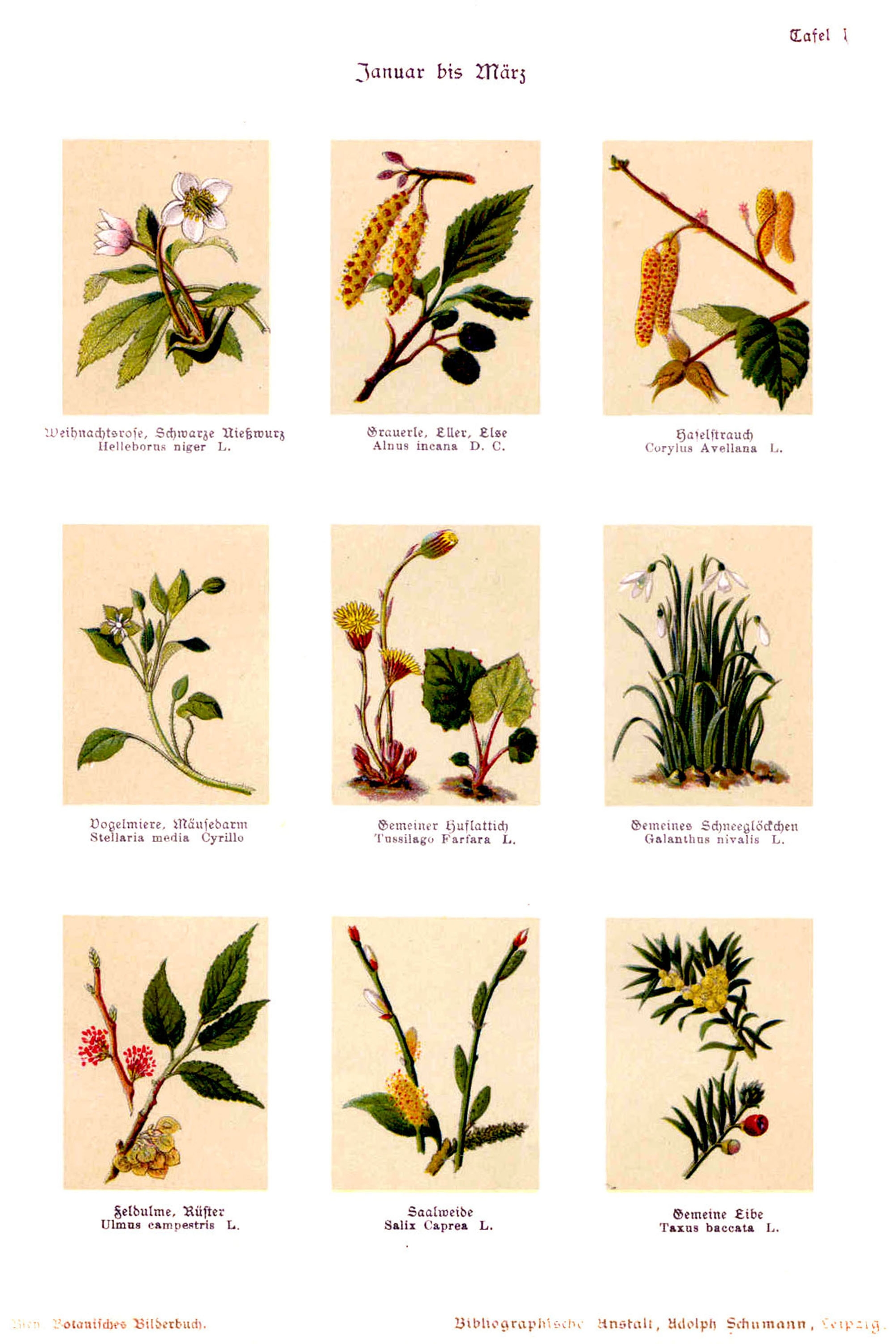
Plate from "Botanisches Bilderbuch für Jung und Alt"

Franz Bley was a German botanist and illustrator best known for his two-volume book Botanisches Bilderbuch für Jung und Alt, published in 1897-8 by Adolph Schumann of Leipzig and Gustav Schmidt of Berlin.

Each volume contains 24 plates showing nine species to a plate. Though small, the chromolithographs of the aquarelles by Franz Bley are precise and carefully coloured, giving an accurate idea of the plant. The book includes a few of the more common fungi. The descriptive text, in Gothic typeface, is by Hermann Berdrow, a prolific author from Berlin.

== Books ==
- "Leitenhamer Geschichten" – Andreas Weinberger
- "Die heimische Pflanzenwelt in wichtigen Vertretern" – Franz Bley
