= Lucien Linden =

Belgian botanist

Charles Lucien Linden (Lucien Charles Antoine Linden, 1851–1940) was a Belgian botanist. He was the son of Jean Jules Linden (1817–1898). He took over his father's company, L'Horticulture Internationale Société Anonyme.
