= Stephanus Cousius =

Botanical illustrator

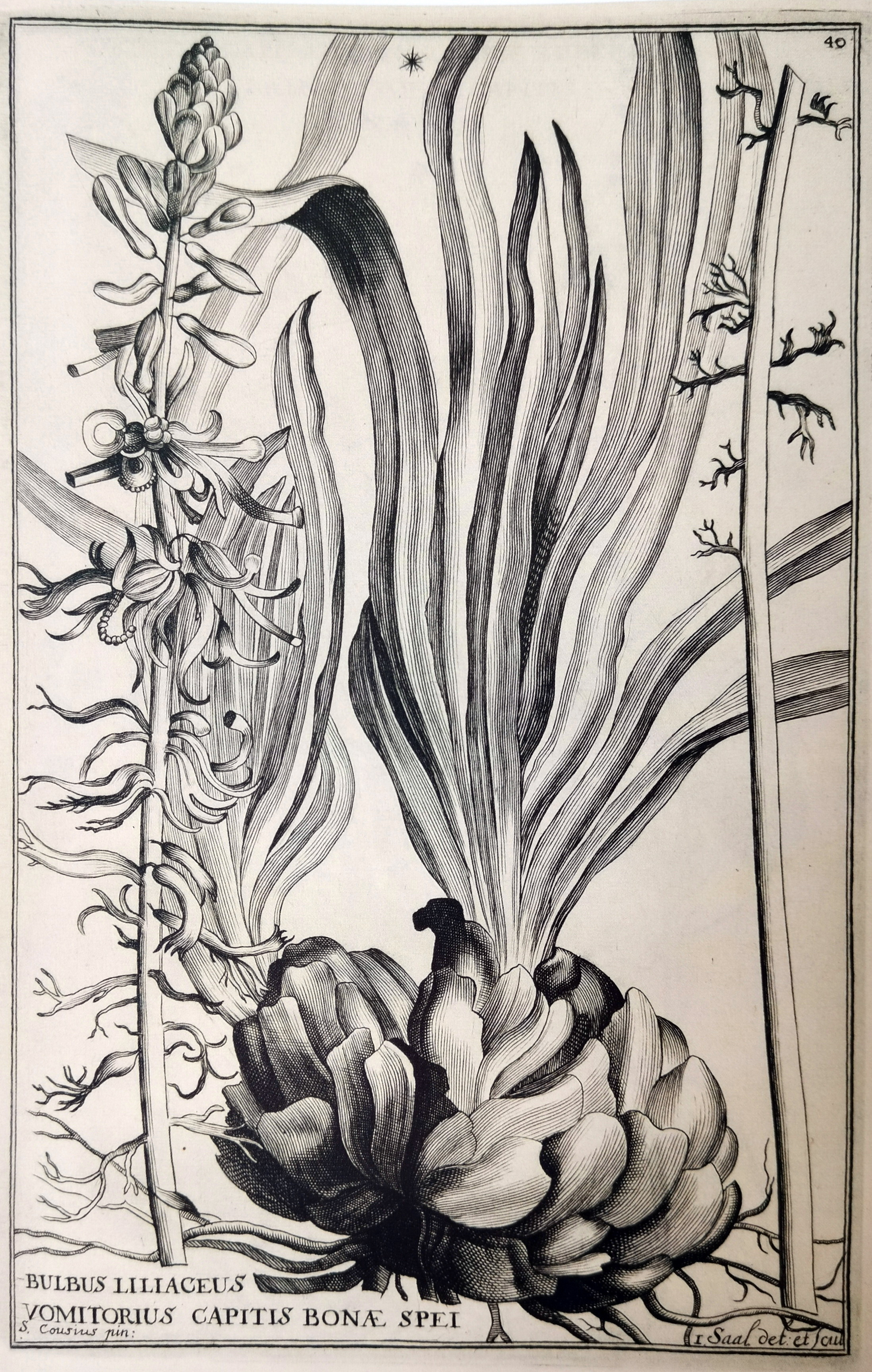
Drimia elata from Jacob Breyne's 1678 'Exoticarum aliarumque minus cognitarum plantarum centuria prima'

Stephanus Cousius (16xx-17xx) was a botanical illustrator known for his contribution of 9 plates to Jacob Breyne's 1678 work Exoticarum aliarumque minus cognitarum plantarum centuria prima (One hundred best exotic and other lesser known plants).
