= Flora von Thüringen =

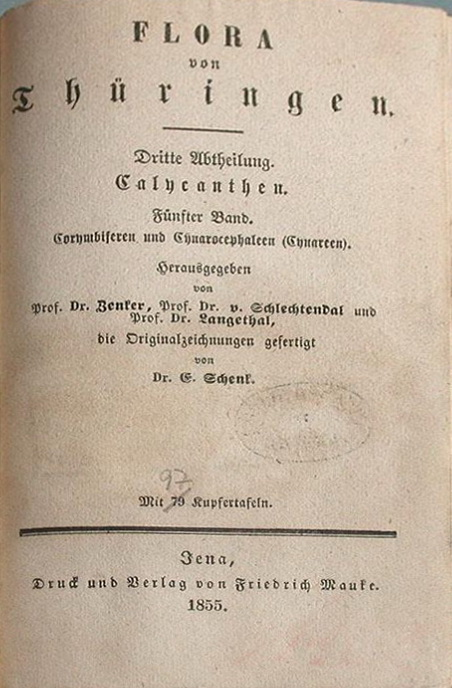

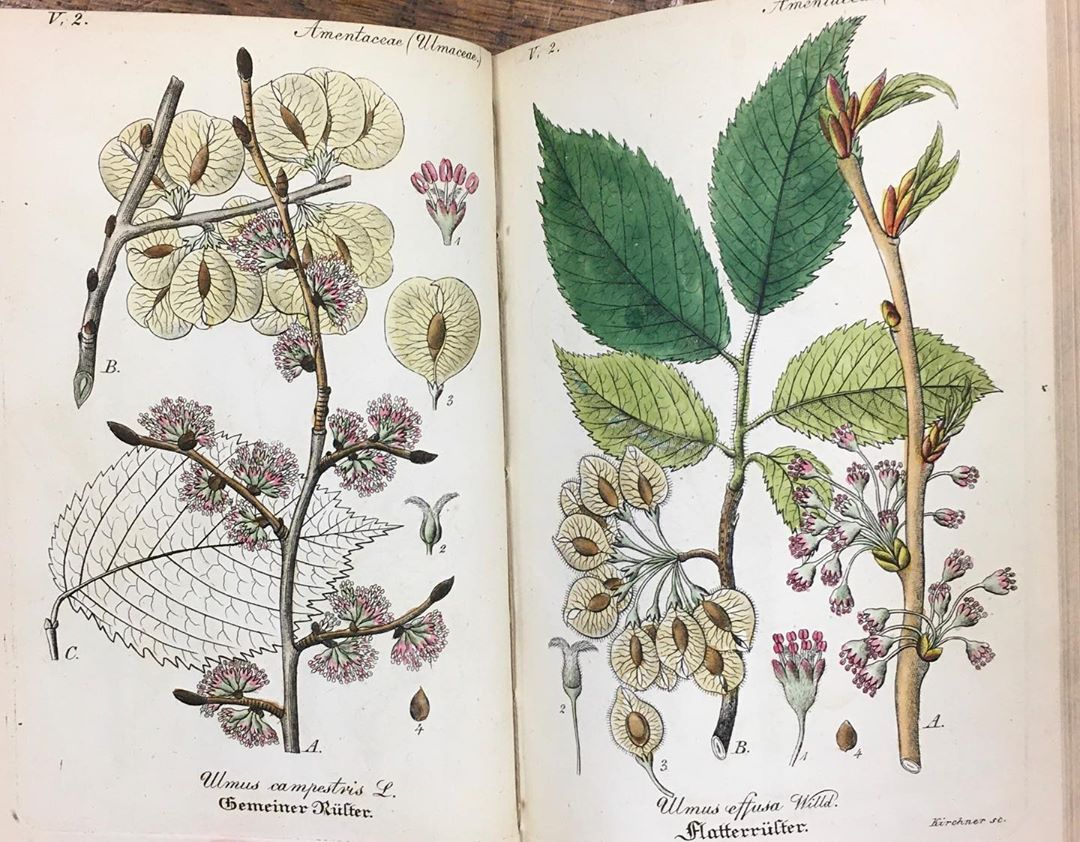

Flora von Thüringen is an extensive botanical coverage of the plants occurring in Thuringia in central Germany. Conceived and initiated by the German naturalist Jonathan Carl Zenker in 1836, its completion was delayed by his untimely death in 1837. The botanists Diederich Franz Leonhard von Schlechtendal (1797–1866) and Christian Eduard Langethal (1806–1878) continued the project and the monumental 12-volume work was published in 1855 by Friedrich Mauke of Jena. The work includes 1444 engraved plates, hand-coloured by Ernst Schenk (1796–1859), as well as descriptive text in German.
