= Withoos =

Withoos is a surname. Notable people with the surname include:

- Matthias Withoos (1627–1703), Dutch painter
- Alida Withoos (1662–1730), Dutch botanical artist, daughter of Matthias
- Casey Withoos, singer
- Johannes Withoos (1648 –c. 1688), Dutch painter
- Pieter Withoos (1655–1692), Dutch painter
