= Frans Withoos =

Dutch painter

Frans Withoos (1665–1705) was a Dutch Golden Age painter and the son of Mathias Withoos and brother of the painters Alida, Maria, Johannes and Pieter.

== Biography ==
Frans Withoos was born in Amersfoort. According to Houbraken Mathias had three sons and four daughters but mentions only the sons and Alida by name. Alida was still alive when Houbraken was writing and gave him the information he used for his sketch on her father and the rest of the family. Frans was the youngest of the family and was baptized like his older brothers and sisters in Amersfoort and moved to Hoorn with his father in the rampjaar 1672. He painted flowers and insects in watercolors like the rest of his siblings, but was not as good as Pieter. He travelled to Indonesia and was hired to be a draughtsman for General Kamphuizen. He returned to Hoorn where he later died.

According to the RKD his works are rare, but he painted in the same style as the rest of the family and signed works as f. withoos. He painted not only in watercolors, but also in oils.
