= Maria Withoos =

Dutch artist (1663–after 1699)

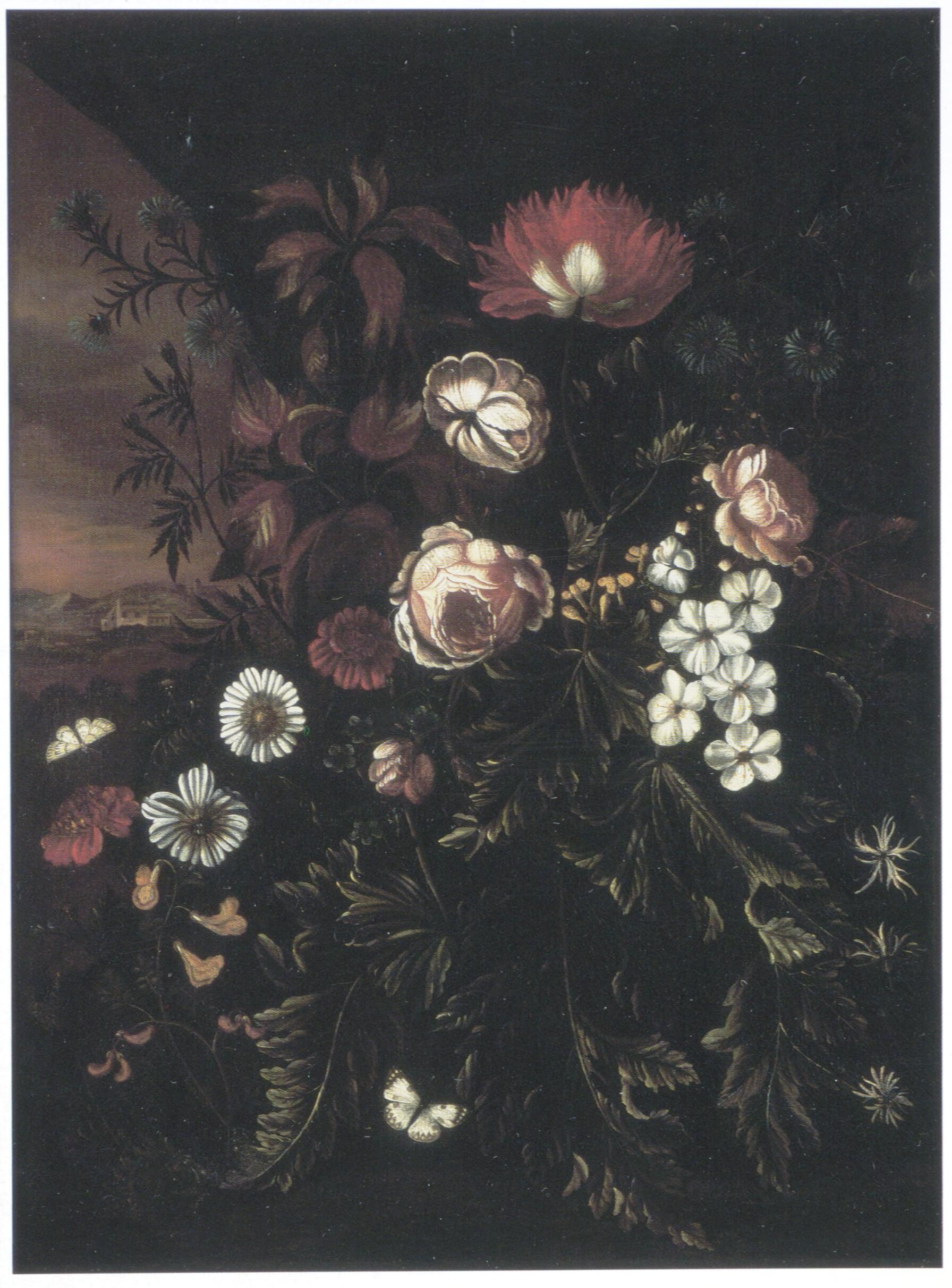
Flowers in a landscape, ca. 1700

Maria Withoos (1663–after 1699) was a Dutch Golden Age painter and the daughter of Mathias Withoos and sister of the painters Alida, Johannes, Frans and Pieter.

== Biography ==
Maria Withoos was born in Amersfoort. According to Houbraken Mathias had three sons and four daughters but mentions only the sons and Alida by name. Alida was still alive when Houbraken was writing and gave him the information he used for his sketch on her father and the rest of the family. Maria was baptized like her other brothers and sisters in Amersfoort and moved to Hoorn with her father in the rampjaar 1672.

According to the RKD one painting has been attributed to her that is now considered Alida's. She married twice in Hoorn; first to Johannes Brickely and in 1698 to Dirck Knijp. She had one son by each of her husbands. Her works may be mixed up with her father's work, since they share the same first initial. She died in Hoorn; the date of her death is uncertain.
