= Johannes Withoos =

Dutch Golden Age painter

Johannes Withoos (1648 – c.1688) was a Dutch Golden Age painter and the eldest son of Mathias Withoos and brother of the painters Alida, Maria, Frans and Pieter.

== Biography ==
Johannes Withoos was born in Amersfoort. According to Houbraken Mathias had three sons and four daughters but mentions only the sons and Alida by name. Alida was still alive when Houbraken was writing and gave him the information he used for his sketch on her father and the rest of the family. Johannes travelled to Rome like his father had done, and came back with lots of sketches of buildings and landscapes. He planned to spend the rest of his days in Holland, but travelled abroad again to the court of Julius Francis, Duke of Saxe-Lauenburg in Ratzeburg. He died there in 1685.

According to the RKD he is known for landscapes in oils. If he made room decorations in Ratzeburg, they would have been destroyed in 1693 when Christian V of Denmark reduced Ratzeburg to rubble by bombardment. He did not die before January 1688, and also didn't die in Ratzeburg, but Amsterdam.
