= Anna Ruysch =

Dutch artist (1666–1754)

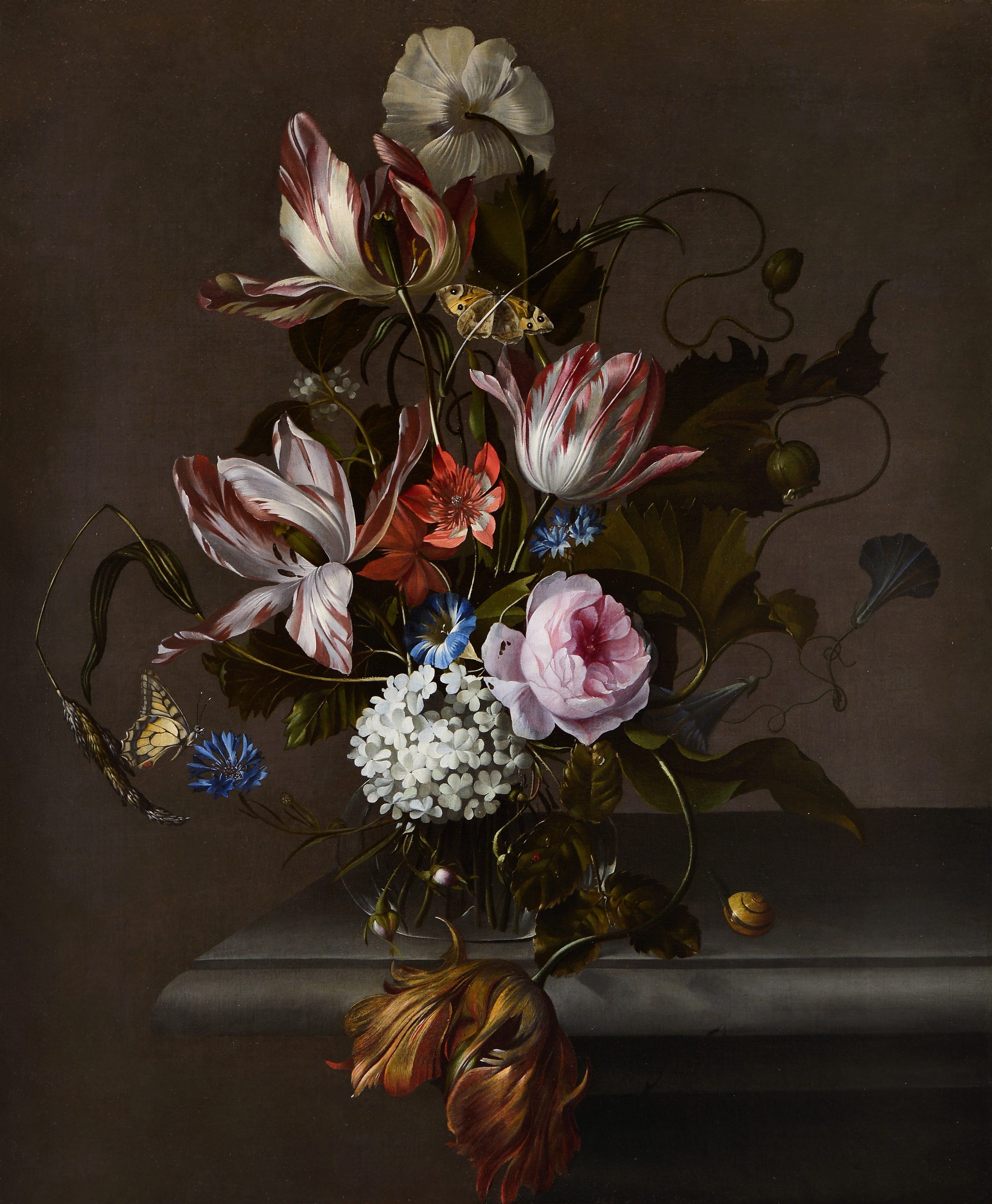
A still life of flowers in a glass vase on a stone table ledge, c.1690s, oil on canvas, Krannert Art Museum, University of Illinois at Urbana-Champaign

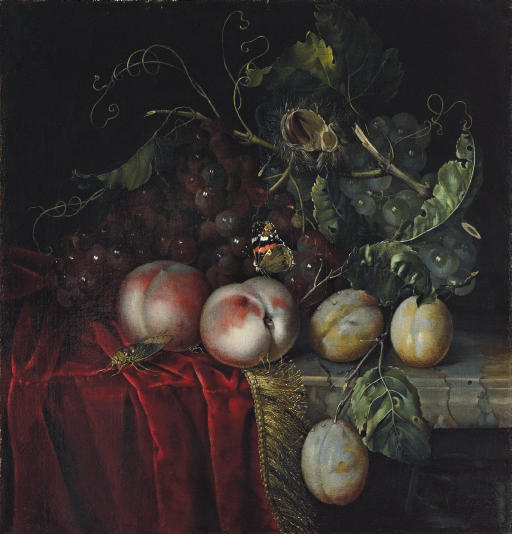
A painting of grapes, two peaches, plums, and a chestnut, with a butterfly and a cockroach, on a partly-draped marble ledge by Anna Ruysch sold at auction in 2007

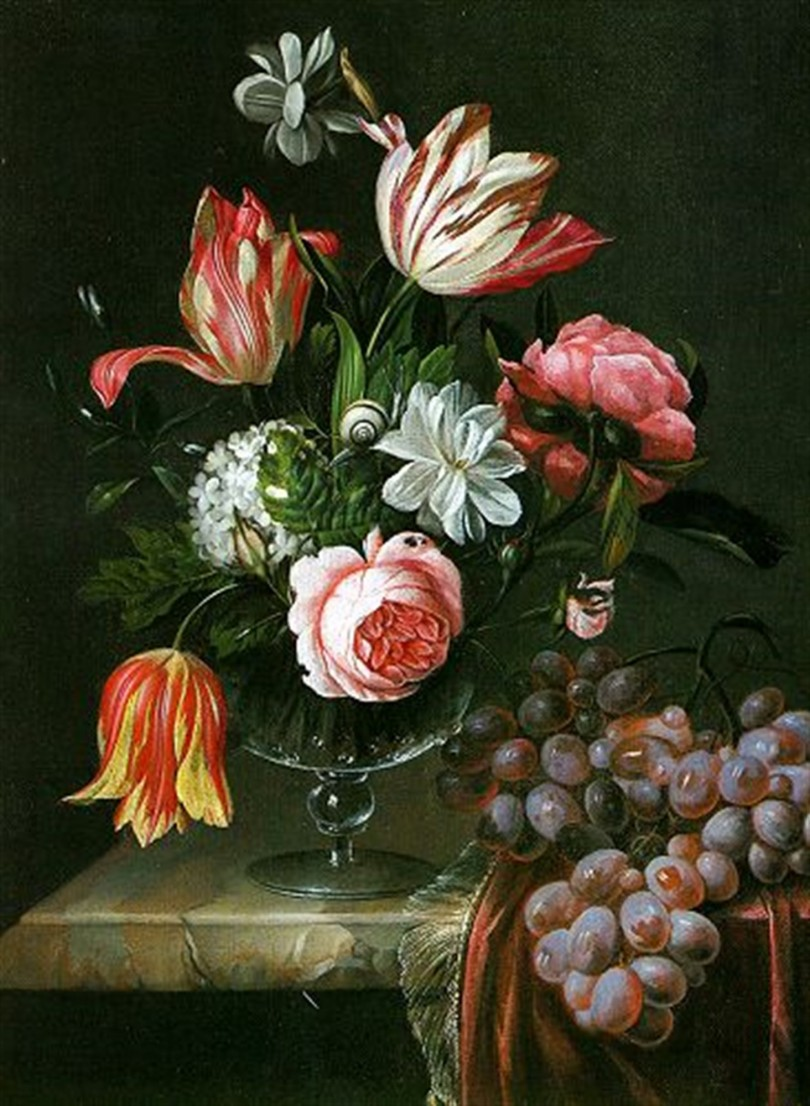
Painting of tulips and roses in a vase on a marble table, attributed to Anna Ruysch (previously attributed to Ernst Stuven).

Anna Ruysch (baptized 19 December 1666, in The Hague – buried 7 January 1754, in Amsterdam) was a Dutch Golden Age flower painter.

== Life ==
Anna Ruysch (sometimes called Anna Elisabeth Ruysch) was the daughter of Maria Post and Frederik Ruysch, a preeminent botanist and anatomist. She was the younger sister of painter Rachel Ruysch. When Anna was an infant the Ruysch family moved from The Hague to Amsterdam, where they lived on the Bloemgracht (flower canal). There Frederik Ruysch was a professor of anatomy and botany and supervisor of the Amsterdam botanical garden. He exhibited anatomical still lifes consisting of insects, flowers, and plants that would become subjects for Anna and Rachel Ruysch. At the age of 15 or 16 Rachel was apprenticed to still life painter Willem van Aelst, and it is assumed that Anna was as well. Rachel also trained with Maria Sibylla Merian, and it is possible Anna did too.

Anna Ruysch painted less frequently after she married the paint dealer Isaak Hellenbroek on July 6, 1688. Their business on the Damrak in Amsterdam was quite successful. In 1742, her husband Isaak, who served as deacon in the Reformed Church, was listed as having the same income as his illustrious sister-in-law Rachel Ruysch: 2500 guilders. The couple had at least six children, three of whom lived to adulthood: Elisabeth Susanna, baptized 1689; Frederik Hendrik, baptized 1697; and Anna Geertruijd, baptized 1707. After her husband's death in 1749, Anna and her son continued to run the paint business. Anna died at age 87 in Amsterdam in 1754.

== Works ==
Both Anna and her sister Rachel Ruysch painted in the same style and painted the same subjects: flowers, fruit, and small animals. Anna Ruysch often used S-curve shapes to enliven her compositions and add dynamism, as did Rachel Ruysch, a technique that originated with Willem van Aelst. Because Anna Ruysch rarely signed her work, there are fewer than ten paintings attributed to her with certainty.

In 2007, a still life by Anna Ruysch sold at auction for £50,900. In 2022 one of her still life paintings was sold at auction for £201,600 and another £327,000.
