= Otto Marseus van Schrieck =

Dutch painter (c. 1613–1678)

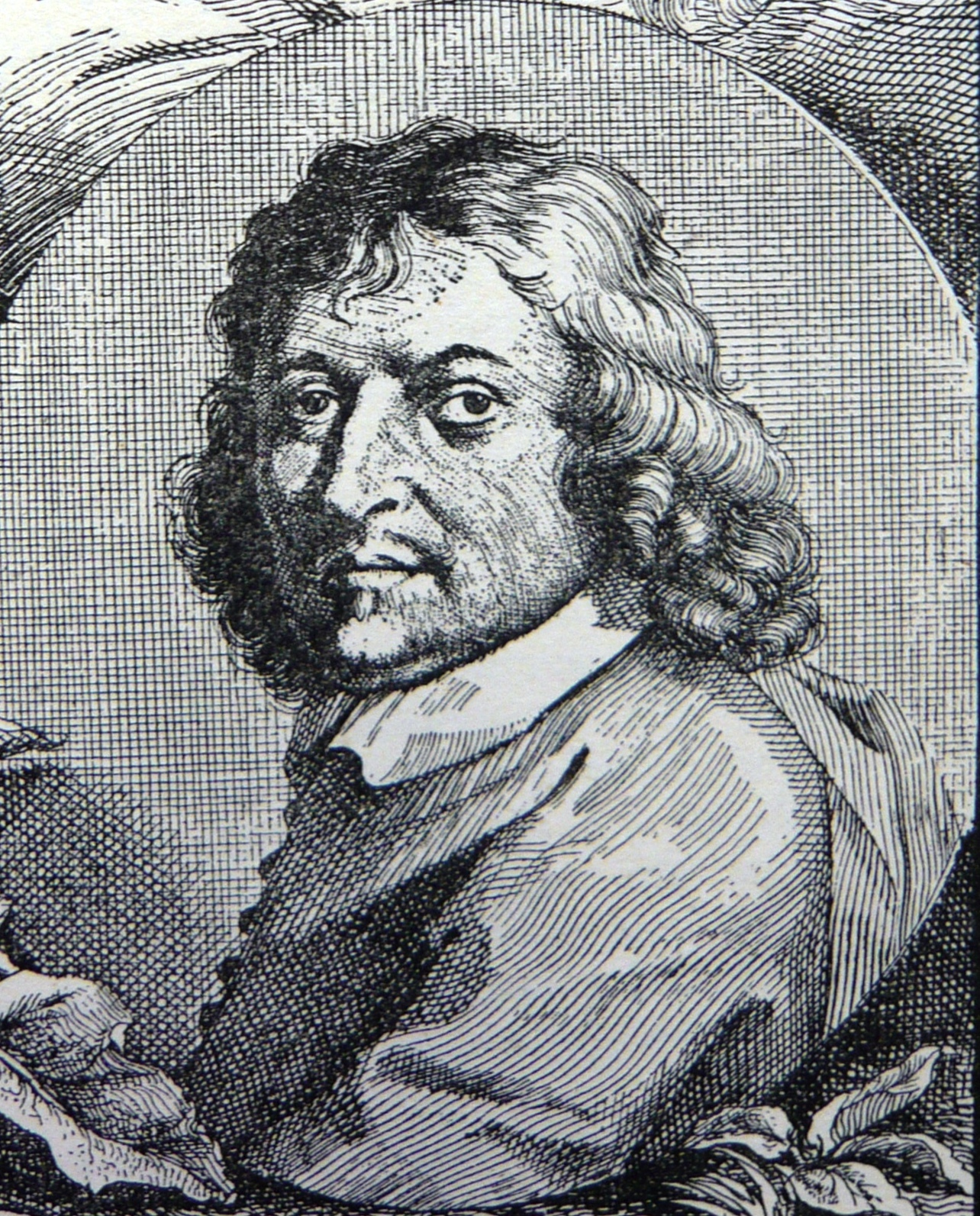
- Born: c. 1613
- Died: June 1678

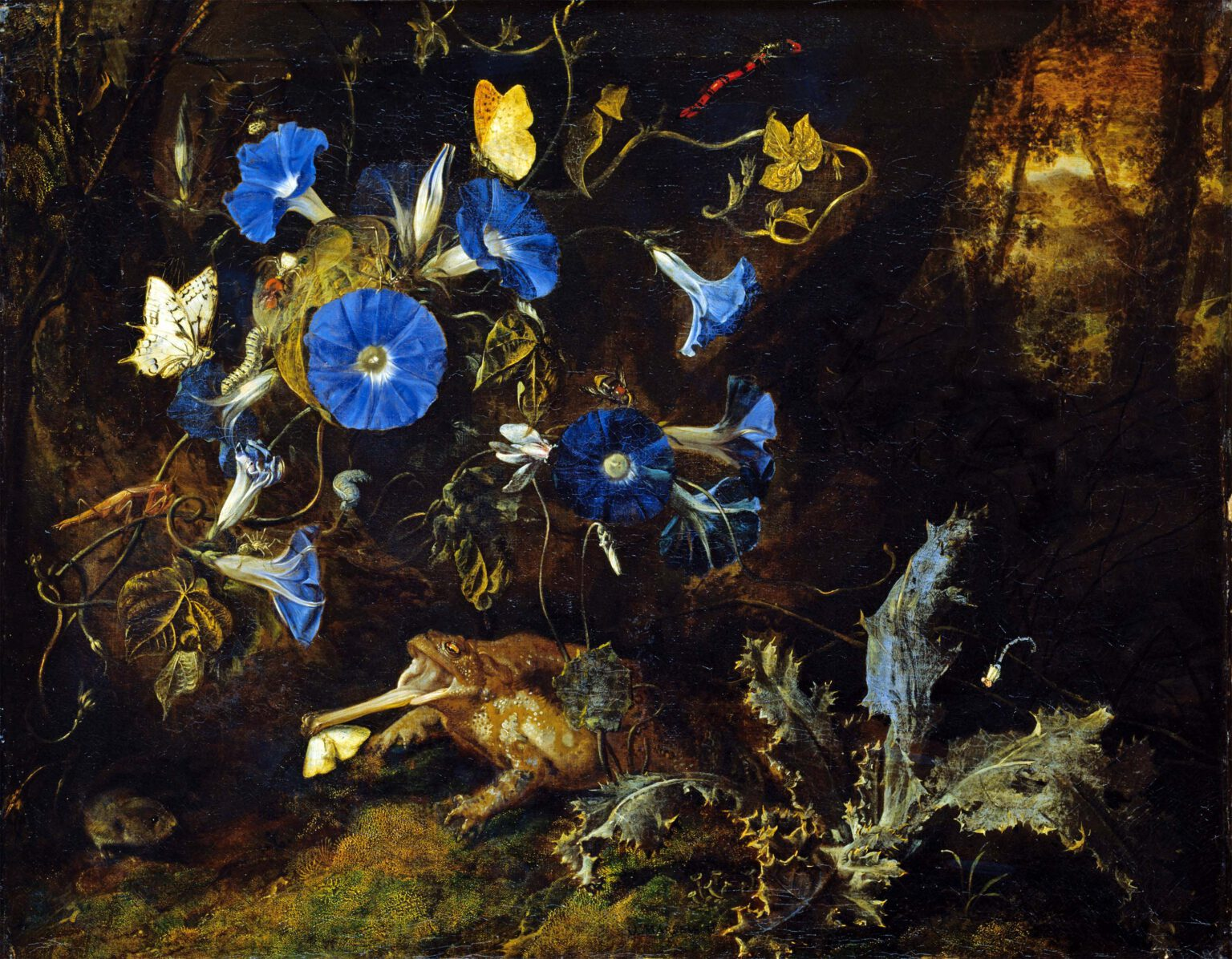
Morning glory, toad, and insects, 1660

Otto Marseus van Schrieck (ca. 1613 – buried 22 June 1678) was a painter in the Dutch Golden Age. He is best known for his paintings of forest flora and fauna.

== Biography ==
Marseus van Schrieck was born in Nijmegen. He spent the years 1652–1657 in Rome and Florence with the painters Matthias Withoos and Willem van Aelst, and there joined the Dutch Guild of Artists. Later he worked at the court of the Grand Duke of Tuscany and traveled throughout England and France, after which he settled in Amsterdam. On 25 April 1664, he married Margarita Gysels (the daughter of Cornelius Gysels, an engraver). Arnold Houbraken's biography of Otto mentions that he joined the Bentvueghels in Rome and was called the snuffelaer, or "ferreter", because he was always in the garden looking for detail. Houbraken quotes Otto's wife, who survived him by two husbands and was still alive when he wrote the book; according to her, Marseus van Schrieck kept snakes and lizards in a shed at the back of his house, and also on a piece of land outside the city that was walled in for this purpose.

== Works ==
Many of his paintings are dark studies of plants, often with lizards at the base and insects on the leaves and branches. According to the Netherlands Institute for Art History, his followers were Willem van Aelst, Anthonie van Borssom, Elias van den Broeck, J Falk, Carl Wilhelm de Hamilton, Trajan Hughes, Nicolaes Lachtropius, Jacob Marrel, Abraham Mignon, Rachel Ruysch, Christiaen Striep, Isac Vromans, Matthias Withoos, and Pieter Withoos. A notable omission in this list is the daughter and sister of the last two mentioned, Alida Withoos, who collaborated with him on creating paintings of the garden of Vijverhof for Agnes Block's collection of garden albums.

Marseus van Schrieck was the first person known to use the technique of lepidochromy, which involved pressing butterfly wings onto his canvases to transfer the scales.
