= Gero Seelig =

German art historian and curator (born 1960)

Giro Seelig
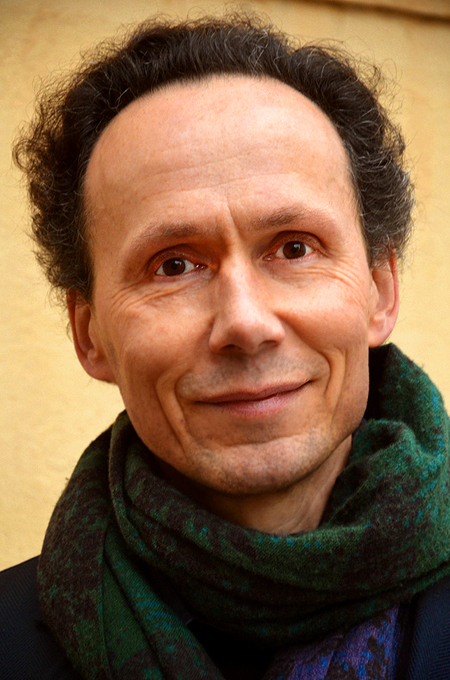
- Born: 1960 (age 65–66)
- Occupations: curator, art historian

Gero Seelig (born 1960) is a German art historian and curator based in Schwerin, Germany. He is the Old Masters Curator at the Staatliches Museum Schwerin, in Schwerin, where he has worked since 2001. He is specialized in German and Dutch artists from the sixteenth and seventeenth centuries and has published extensively on prints, drawings, and paintings from these periods.

== Research and career ==
Seelig has played a crucial role in several significant exhibitions, such as "Medusa’s Menagerie," which highlighted the works of Otto Marseus van Schrieck, and "Crossroads: Frankfurt am Main as Market for Northern Art 1500-1800," where he contributed to the impact of artists like Jost Amman.

His research has also delved into the acquisition practices of the Mecklenburg-Schwerin court, bringing to light the historical context and provenance of numerous artworks.

Gero Seelig's research and curatorial work often intersects with unique historical events and figures, such as his exploration of the 1749 presentation of the rhinoceros Clara at the Palace of Versailles, which he discussed in a 2024 episode of WDR's Zeitzeichen program.

== Publications ==
=== 2019 ===
- Seelig, Gero. "Moretus’ Punch Boxes – Woodcuts by Jost Amman in Antwerp." Essay in Crossroads: Frankfurt am Main as Market for Northern Art 1500-1800, edited by Miriam Hall Kirch, Birgit Ulrike Münch, Alison G. Stewart, pp. 52-65. Petersberg: Michael Imhof Verlag, 2019.

=== 2017 ===
- Seelig, Gero, et al. Medusa’s Menagerie: Otto Marseus van Schrieck and the Scholars. Exhibition catalogue. München: Hirmer Verlag, 2017.
- Seelig, Gero. "Because the Night. Paintings by Schalcken for Schwerin." Wallraf-Richartz-Jahrbuch, vol. 77, 2017, pp. 187–204.

=== 2016 ===
- Seelig, Gero. "Dutch Mannerism." Essay in The Ashgate Research Companion to Dutch Art of the Seventeenth Century, edited by Wayne Franits, pp. 252–264. London: Routledge, 2016.

=== 2015 ===
- Seelig, Gero. "Schwerin und seine Sammlung niederländischer Gemälde." Essay in Nie tylko tulipany/Nicht nur Tulpen. Das Staatliche Museum Schwerin zu Gast im Nationalmuseum, pp. 31–59. Exhibition catalogue, 2015.

=== 2013 ===
- Seelig, Gero. "Jan van Huysum und der Hof von Mecklenburg-Schwerin." Oud Holland, vol. 126, 2013, pp. 136–161.
- Seelig, Gero. "Watteau in Hamburg. Zur Tätigkeit des Kunsthändlers Pieter Boetens." Zeitschrift für Kunstgeschichte, vol. 76, 2013, pp. 107–118.
- Seelig, Gero. Kosmos der Niederländer. Die Sammlung Christoph Müller. Collection catalogue. Petersberg: Michael Imhof Verlag, 2013.
- Seelig, Gero. "Curator’s Collection. The Staatliches Museum Schwerin." CODART eZine, Autumn 2013.

=== 2012 ===
- Seelig, Gero. "Gerhard Morell and the Last Acquisitions of Christian Ludwig of Mecklenburg-Schwerin." Journal of Historians of Netherlandish Art, 4:1 (2012).

=== 2010 ===
- Seelig, Gero. Die Holländische Genremalerei in Schwerin. Collection Catalogue. Petersberg: Michael Imhof Verlag, 2010.

=== 2006 ===
- Seelig, Gero. "Berchems werken in Frankrĳk in de achttiende eeuw." Essay in Nicolaes Berchem: in het licht van Italië, edited by Pieter Biesboer, pp. 59–72, 163. Exhibition catalogue. Haarlem: Frans Hals Museum, 2006.
- Seelig, Gero. "Privatsammlungen und fürstlicher Kunstbesitz." Essay in Im Licht der Zeit: niederländische Gemälde aus einer Privatsammlung. Exhibition catalogue. Schwerin: Staatliche Museum Schwerin, 2006.
- Seelig, Gero. "The dating of Fabritius’s stay in Amsterdam." Oud Holland, vol. 119, 2006, pp. 93–98.

=== 2005 ===
- Seelig, Gero. "Carel Fabritius, Ausstellung und Tagung im Staatlichen Museum Schwerin." Mitteilungen des Museumsverbandes in Mecklenburg-Vorpommern e.V., vol. 14, 2005, pp. 46–49.
- Seelig, Gero. "Review of symposium on Carel Fabritius, The Hague, December 1 and 2, 2004." Kunstchronik, vol. 58, 2005, pp. 6–11.

=== 2004 ===
- Duparc, Frederik J., with contributions by Gero Seelig and Ariane van Suchtelen. Carel Fabritius, 1622-1654: das Werk. Exhibition catalogue. The Hague: Mauritshuis, Schwerin: Staatliches Museum, Zwolle: Waanders Publishers, 2004.
- Seelig, Gero. "Review of exhibition catalogue Pan und Syrinx: Peter Paul Rubens, Jan Brueghel und ihre Zeitgenossen, Kassel 2004." Kunstform, 2004.
- Seelig, Gero. "Review of E. Korthals Altes, De verovering van de internationale kunstmarkt door de zeventiende-eeuwse schilderkunst, Leiden 2003." Sehepunkte, 2004.
- Seelig, Gero. "Review of M. Dekiert, Musikanten in der Malerei der niederländischen Caravaggio-Nachfolge, Weimar 2003." Kunstform, 2004.

=== 2003 ===
- Seelig, Gero, and Kornelia von Berswordt-Wallrabe, editors. Jan Brueghels Antwerpen: die flämischen Gemälde in Schwerin. Exhibition catalogue. Schwerin: Staatliches Museum Schwerin, 2003.

=== 1998 ===
- Seelig, Gero. "Review of H. Mielke, Pieter Breughel: die Zeichnungen, Turnhout 1996." Zeitschrift für Kunstgeschichte, vol. 61, 1998, pp. 422–25.

=== 1997 ===
- Seelig, Gero. Abraham Bloemaert (1566-1651): Studien zur Utrechter Malerei um 1620. Monograph, trade publication of doctoral dissertation. Berlin: Mann, 1997.
- Seelig, Gero. "Hendrick Bloemaert in Italy." Master Drawings, vol. 25, 1997, pp. 380–91.

=== 1996 ===
- Seelig, Gero. "Review of M. Roethlisberger, Abraham Bloemaert and his Sons, Doornspijk 1993." Kunstchronik, vol. 49, 1996, pp. 97–105.

=== 1994 ===
- Seelig, Gero. "Ter Brugghens Lazarus-Gemälde: eine Bassano-Adaption." Oud Holland, vol. 108, 1994, pp. 14–16.
