= Georg Hainz =

German painter

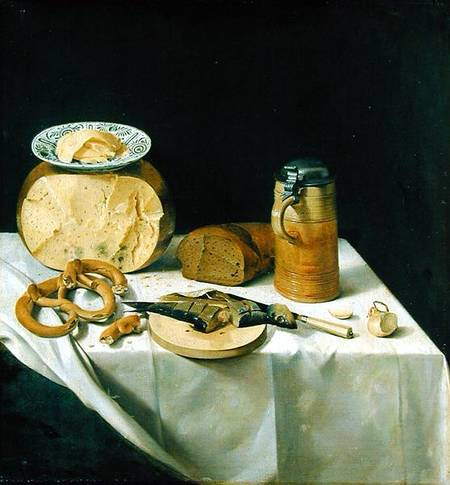
Breakfast Still Life, 1662

Georg Hainz (1630–1700) was a German Baroque painter. He is sometimes called Heintz or Hinz.

== Biography ==
He was born in Altenau. According to the RKD, Hainz is known for still life paintings and was the teacher of Christian Berentz. He was possibly also the teacher of Franz Werner von Tamm.

According to Houbraken who called him Hins, he was the teacher of Ernst Stuven and took him into his home when he noticed how much talent the young boy had.

Hainz died in Hamburg in 1700.
