= Christian Berentz =

German painter

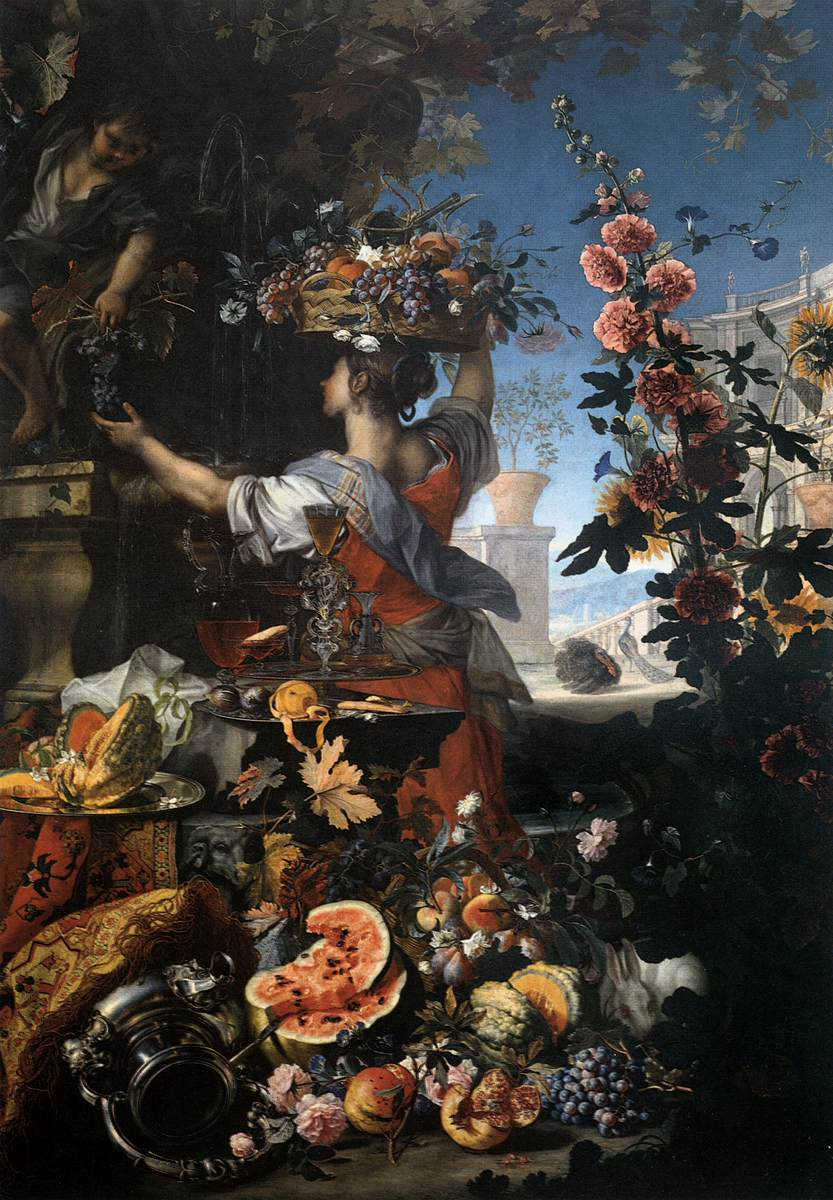
Christian Berentz, Flowers, Fruit with a Woman Picking Grapes, by Berentz and Carlo Maratta, National Museum of Capodimonte, 1689

Christian Berentz, or Bernetz (1658–1722), was a German Baroque painter.

== Biography ==
Berentz was born in Hamburg, Germany. According to the RKD pupil, he was the pupil of Hermann Kamphusen from 1667 to 1673 and then, from 1673 to 1677, a pupil of Georg Hainz. He travelled through the Netherlands in the years 1677–1679, and in 1679 he travelled to Venice and from there to Rome, where he stayed until 1722. Like Franz Werner von Tamm (called Dapper), he is registered as the teacher of Pietro Navarra. Like Tamm, Berentz is also registered as working in the Carlo Maratta studio. He is known for still lifes in the manner of Pieter Claesz, Maximilian Pfeiler, Willem Kalf, Pieter Gerritsz van Roestraten, and Francesco Noletti.

In Rome in the 1700s, he lived in the house of Marchese Pallavicini. Berentz painted primarily still lifes, which was important because he introduced North European themes. He died in Rome in 1722.
