= Ernst Stuven =

German painter

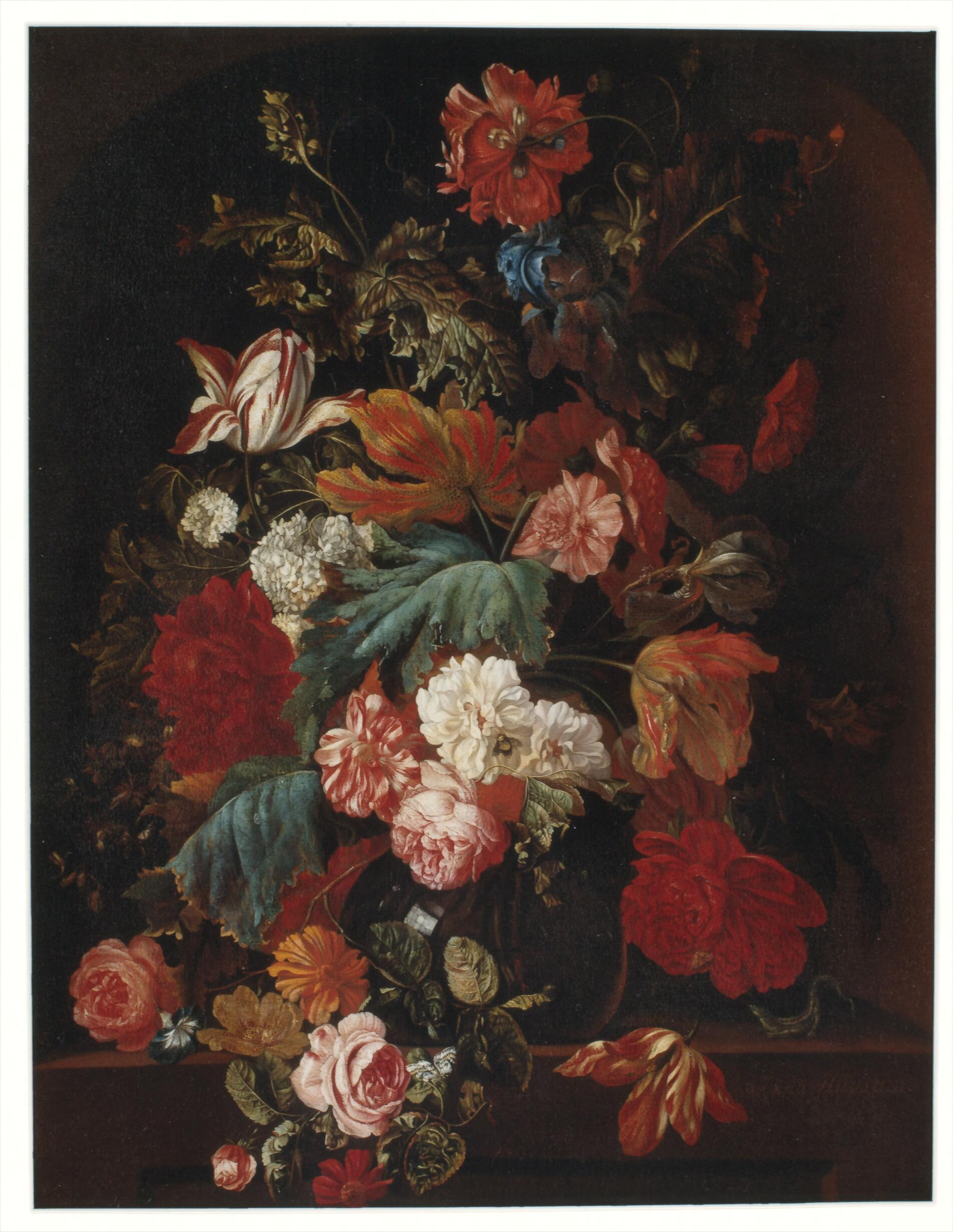
Flowers on a stone slab, c. 1695-1712

Ernst Stuven (c. 1657–1712) was a German Baroque flower painter.

== Biography ==
According to Houbraken, he was born in Hamburg, where he was initially trained by Georg Hainz. At the age of eighteen he moved to Amsterdam (c. 1675–1677), where he became a pupil of Johannes Voorhout, who he knew from Hamburg. Being more interested in flower painting, he soon joined the studio of Willem van Aelst, and after a period with him, he switched to Abraham Mignon. His works sold well and he got married, and though Houbraken mentions children, no known sons are listed as pupils. Houbraken mentions in his biography of Elias van den Broeck that he had been Stuven's first and best pupil (c. 1665). Stuven's pupils according to the RKD were Herman van der Mijn, J.W. Windtraken, and Willem Grasdorp.

Houbraken wrote five pages about the abusive relationship in 1697 between Willem Grasdorp and Ernst Stuven. When Grasdorp tried to escape, Stuven prevented this and when Grasdorp's mother called upon the authorities, Stuven was so aggressive to them that he was sentenced for 12 years in the Rasphuis in Amsterdam. He was allowed out for good conduct after half of that time, and was taken in by Romeyn de Hooghe in Haarlem (c. 1703–1705). He later moved to Rotterdam, where he painted for a gentlemen named De Beer who kept him for a ducat per day and room & board, which is where he later died.
