= Isac Vromans =

Dutch Golden Age painter

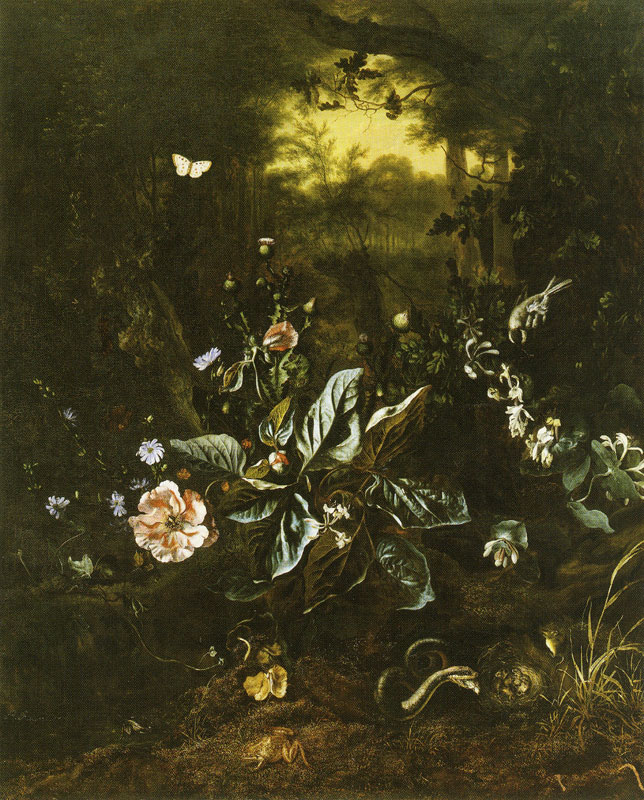
Snake eating newly hatched bird out of a nest among flowers in a forest floor with a frog, mouse and insects, 1703

Isac Vromans (1658–1706), was a Dutch Golden Age painter.

== Biography ==
He was probably born in Delft as the son of Pieter Abrahamsz Vromans and Maria Elseviers. Though his parents were not artists, he was related to other Delft painters of the Vromans name such as Jacobus Vromans and Pieter Vromans.

According to the RKD he became a follower of Otto Marseus van Schrieck, and earned the nickname "slangenschilder" or snake painter. From 1688 to 1692 he was a member of the Guild of St. Luke in Schiedam, then he moved to the Hague before being last registered in Den Bosch in 1706.

According to a 5-page biography by Jacob Campo Weyerman, who didn't know his first name or place of birth, he was born in 1658. Weyerman included a detailed description of one of his paintings, mentioning that he painted a nest on a forest floor with newly hatched chicks threatened by a snake. The mother bird was defending her nest and one chick stuck its head among the twigs, one joined its mother in a fight and a third attempted to flee. Weyerman also mentioned three stories about Vroman becoming a hermit on the heath and wearing nothing but sheepskins, building a flying machine and breaking a leg, and making an elixir from milk that spoiled from the summer heat.
