= Jacob van Staverden =

Dutch painter

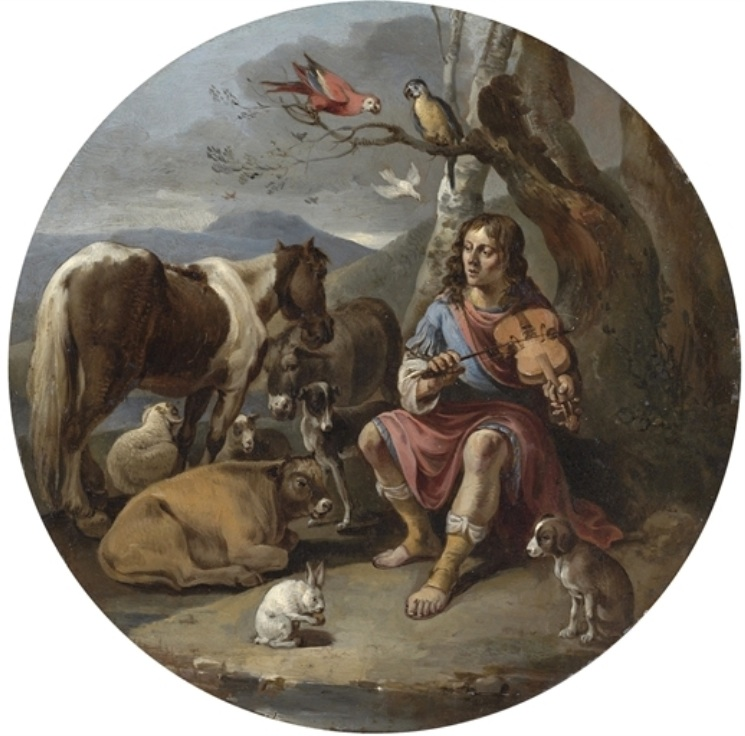
Orpheus playing the lyre

Jacob van Staverden (1656 – (after) 1716) was a Dutch painter who emigrated to Rome where he formed part of the group of genre painters known as the Bamboccianti.

== Life ==
Details about his life are scarce. He was born in Amersfoort. He trained probably until 1672 in Amersfoort under the still life and cityscape painter Matthias Withoos, who had previously lived and worked in Rome. He was active in Amersfoort until 1674, the year in which he left for Italy together with Caspar van Wittel, another pupil of Withoos. He is documented in Rome on 3 January 1675. Here he became a member of the Bentvueghels, an association of mainly Dutch and Flemish artists working in Rome. It was customary for the Bentvueghels to adopt an appealing nickname, the so-called 'bent name'. Jacob van Staverden was given the bent name Ijver (diligence). He also became close to the 'Bamboccianti', a loose group of principally Dutch and Flemish genre painters residing in Rome who took the everyday life of the lower classes in Rome and its countryside as the preferred subject of their paintings.

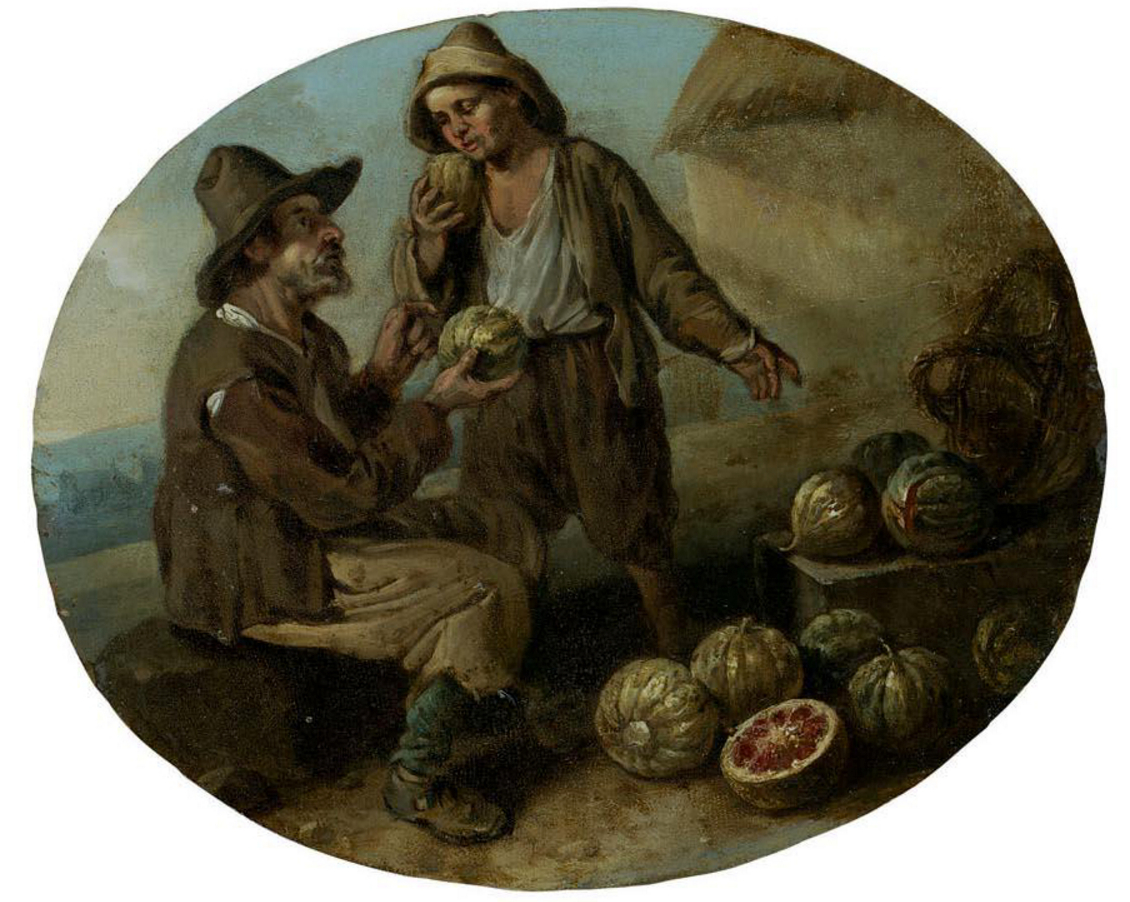
A watermelon vendor and a young boy

In March 1686 and January 1687 he is documented back in Amersfoort. He left again for Rome where he resided from 1689 until his death. In Rome he is recorded as living with Caspar Van Wittel in 1689 and in 1693–94. He entered the service of the Papal Guard in Rome in 1694. According to the early Dutch biographer Jan van Gool the reason for this was that he was not very successful as an artist in Rome. Van Gool also maliciously states that van Staverden was passing himself off as a nobleman in Rome while in fact his father was 'only a common craftsman'.

Jacob van Staverden's name appears in various documents dated 1706, 1710 and 1712 and 1716 relating to the sale of assets to raise money. His profession is not mentioned in these records. The last record on the artist is dated 1716. It is not known when or where the artist died, although it is assumed he died in Rome.

== Work ==
Only a small number of paintings of van Staverden are known and then only on the basis of attributions. They are mainly genre paintings in the style of the Bamboccianti. Van Gool mentions that van Staverden painted flower and fruit still lifes, but no known examples by his hand in this genre are known today.
