= Nicolaes Lachtropius =

Dutch Golden Age flower painter

Nicolaes Lachtropius (1640, Amsterdam – 1700, Alphen aan den Rijn), was a Dutch Golden Age flower painter.

== Biography ==
According to the RKD he was a flower still life painter who followed Otto Marseus van Schrieck. He worked in Amsterdam, The Hague and in Leiden and was last registered in Alphen aan den Rijn.
