= Christiaen Striep =

Dutch painter

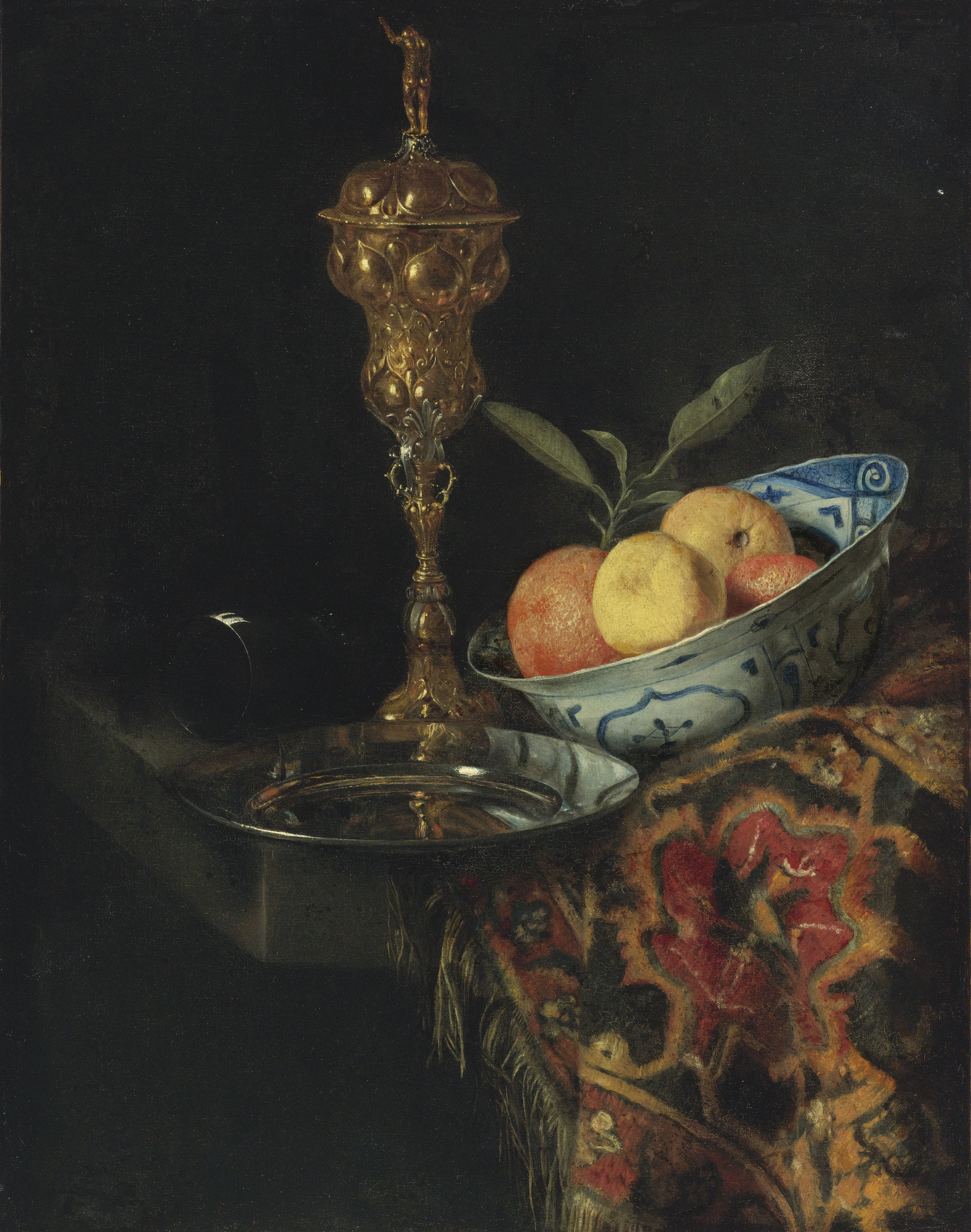
A still life with a bowl of oranges, a pewter plate and a gilt cup

Christiaen Striep (1634 in Den Bosch – 1673 in Amsterdam), was a Dutch Golden Age painter.

According to Houbraken he was the teacher of the painter Abraham de Heusch.

According to the RKD he got married in Amsterdam in 1655 and in 1656 he became a citizen there. He was a follower of Otto Marseus van Schrieck and Willem Kalf. No other works than still-life paintings are known, and he did not date his works.
