= Willem Grasdorp =

Dutch painter

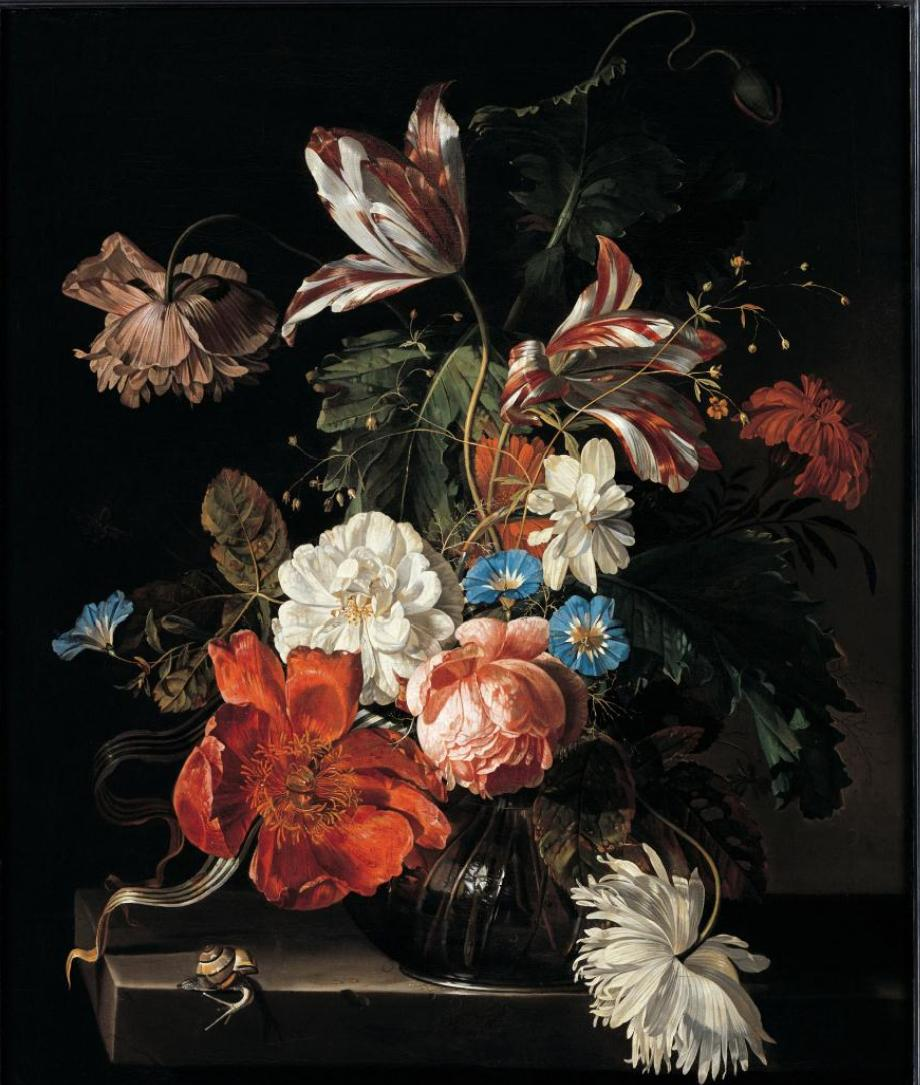
Still life of flowers in a glass vase

Willem Grasdorp (1678 in Zwolle – 1723 in Amsterdam), was an 18th-century painter from the Dutch Republic.

== Biography ==
According to Houbraken after the death of his father, his mother and stepfather apprenticed him in Amsterdam for three years to learn flower painting. Houbraken wrote five pages about the abusive relationship in 1697 between Willem Grasdorp and his teacher Ernst Stuven there. When Grasdorp tried to escape, Stuven prevented this and when Grasdorp's mother came from Zwolle and called upon the local authorities, Stuven was so aggressive to them that he was sentenced for 12 years in the Rasphuis in Amsterdam.

According to the RKD he painted flower and fruit still lifes, and came from an old painting family from Zwolle. His father was the landscape painter Jan Grasdorp, and Gerrit, Jan Willem, and Engbert Grasdorp were also painters in Zwolle.
