= Lepidochromy =

Technique to preserve appearance of butterfly and moth wings

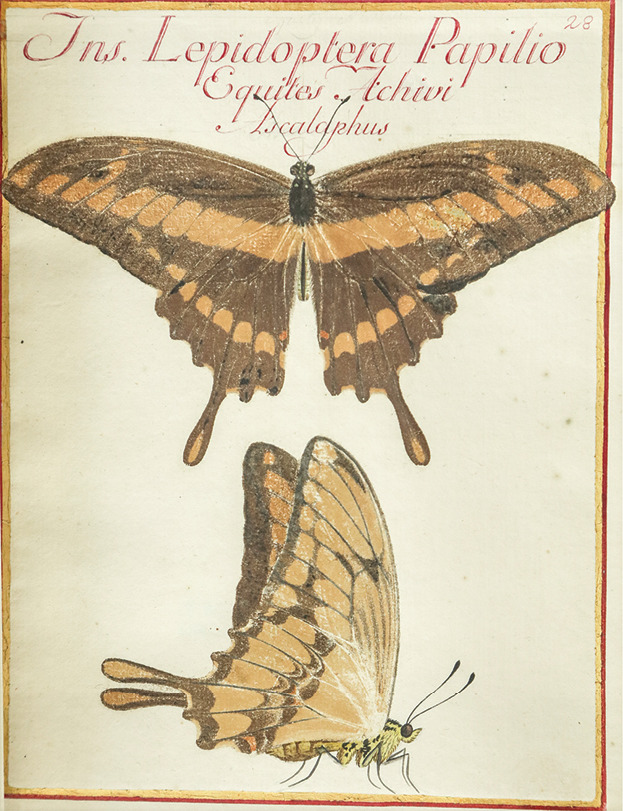
Example of lepidochromy from Lepidoptera Fluminensis (circa 1789)

Lepidochromy, sometimes called "nature printing", is a technique used to preserve the natural coloration of butterfly and moth wings by transferring the wing scales onto a flat surface, typically paper or glass, coated with adhesive. This technique has been used by entomologists and naturalists to document Lepidoptera (butterflies and moths) without having to preserve entire specimens. The first known uses of this technique were by the Dutch painter and naturalist Otto Marseus van Schrieck in the 17th century. During the 20th century, the technique declined in use and was eventually abandoned.
