= Abraham de Heusch =

Dutch painter

Abraham de Heusch (1635, Utrecht – 30 April 1712, Leerdam), was a Dutch Golden Age painter.

== Biography ==
According to Houbraken he painted all sorts of plants, salamanders, snakes and other animals in small chapels and ruins in a natural manner. He married in Dordrecht, and when his wife died he joined the navy. He then remarried and returned to Leerdam where he lived off rents and died the mayor of that town.

According to the RKD he was a pupil of the painter Christiaen Striep in Amsterdam, and worked in Dordrecht and with the Dutch navy before moving to Leerdam. No known works survive.
