= Philip van Kouwenbergh =

Dutch painter

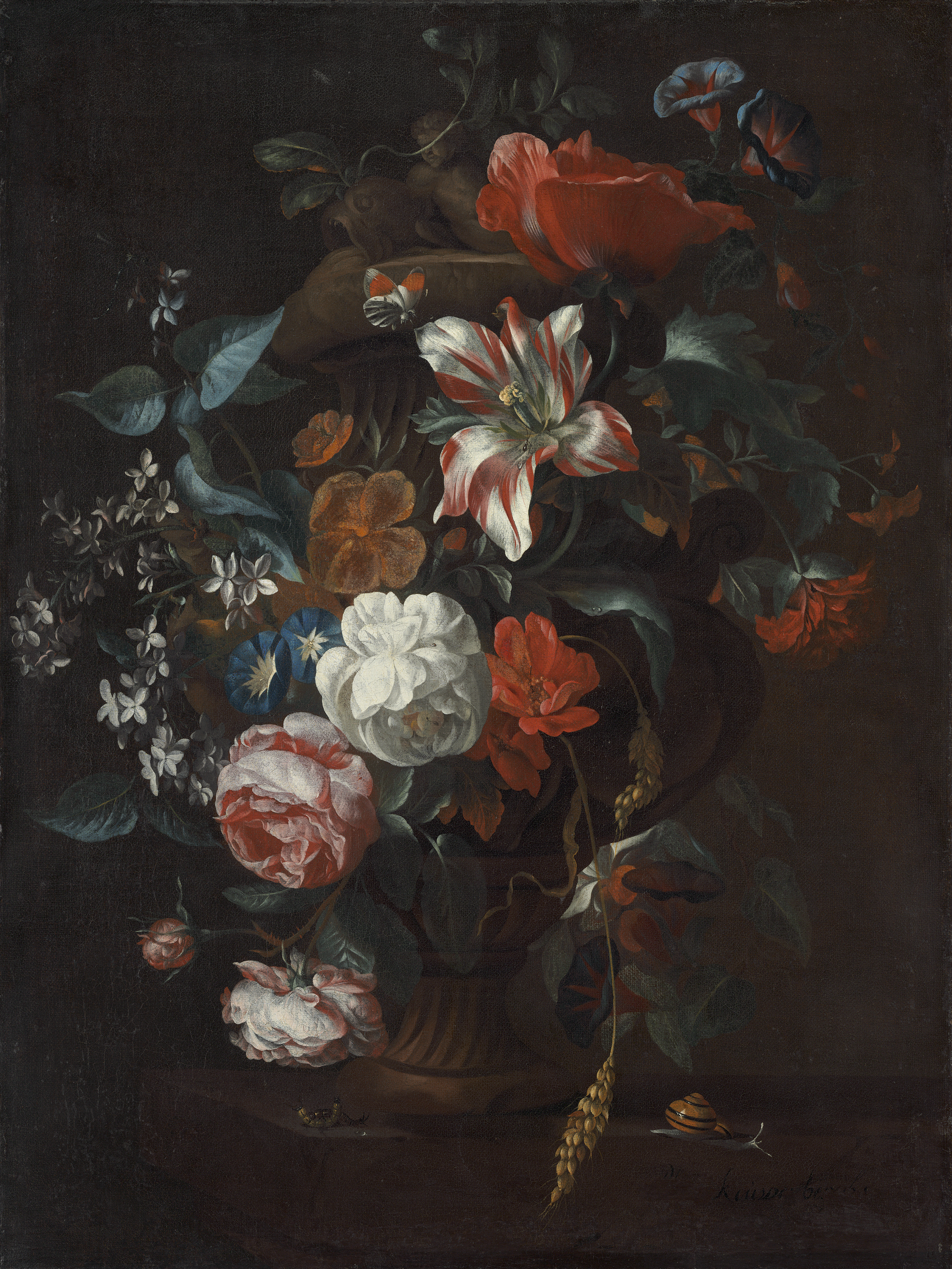
Flowers in a Vase by Philip van Kouwenbergh, circa 1700

Philip van Kouwenbergh (1671 – 1729) was an 18th-century flower painter from the Dutch Republic.

== Biography ==
He was born in Amsterdam. According to the RKD he was a pupil of Elias van den Broeck and is known for flower still lifes.

He lived his whole life in Amsterdam, where he later died.
