= Caspar van Wittel =

Dutch painter (1652/3–1736)

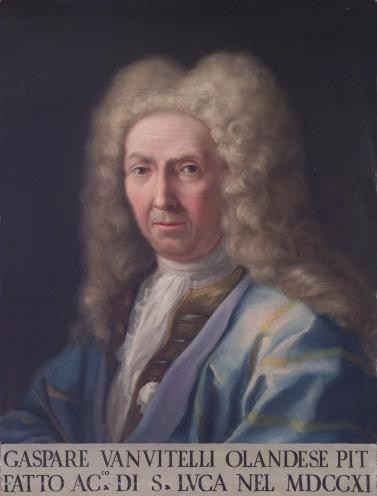
- Portrait of van Wittel by his son Luigi
- Born: Jasper Adriaensz van Wittel; 1652 or 1653; Amersfoort, Dutch Republic
- Died: 13 September 1736 (aged 83–84); Rome, Papal States
- Known for: Landscapes

Caspar van Wittel or Gaspar van Wittel (Dutch: [ˈkɑspɑr vɑɱ ˈʋɪtəl, ˈɡɑs-]; born Jasper Adriaensz van Wittel; 1652 or 1653 – 13 September 1736), known in Italian as Gaspare Vanvitelli (IPA: [ˈɡaspare vaɱviˈtɛlli]) or Gasparo degli Occhiali (IPA: [ˈɡasparo deʎʎ okˈkjaːli]), was a Dutch painter and draughtsman who had a long career in Rome, Papal States. He played a pivotal role in the development of the genre of topographical painting known as veduta. He is credited with turning topography into a painterly specialism in Italian art.

== Life ==
Van Wittel was born into a Roman Catholic family in Amersfoort. His father was a cart maker. Caspar studied painting in Amersfoort with the relatively obscure Thomas Jansz van Veenendaal for 4 or 5 years and then with the better known Matthias Withoos for 7 years.

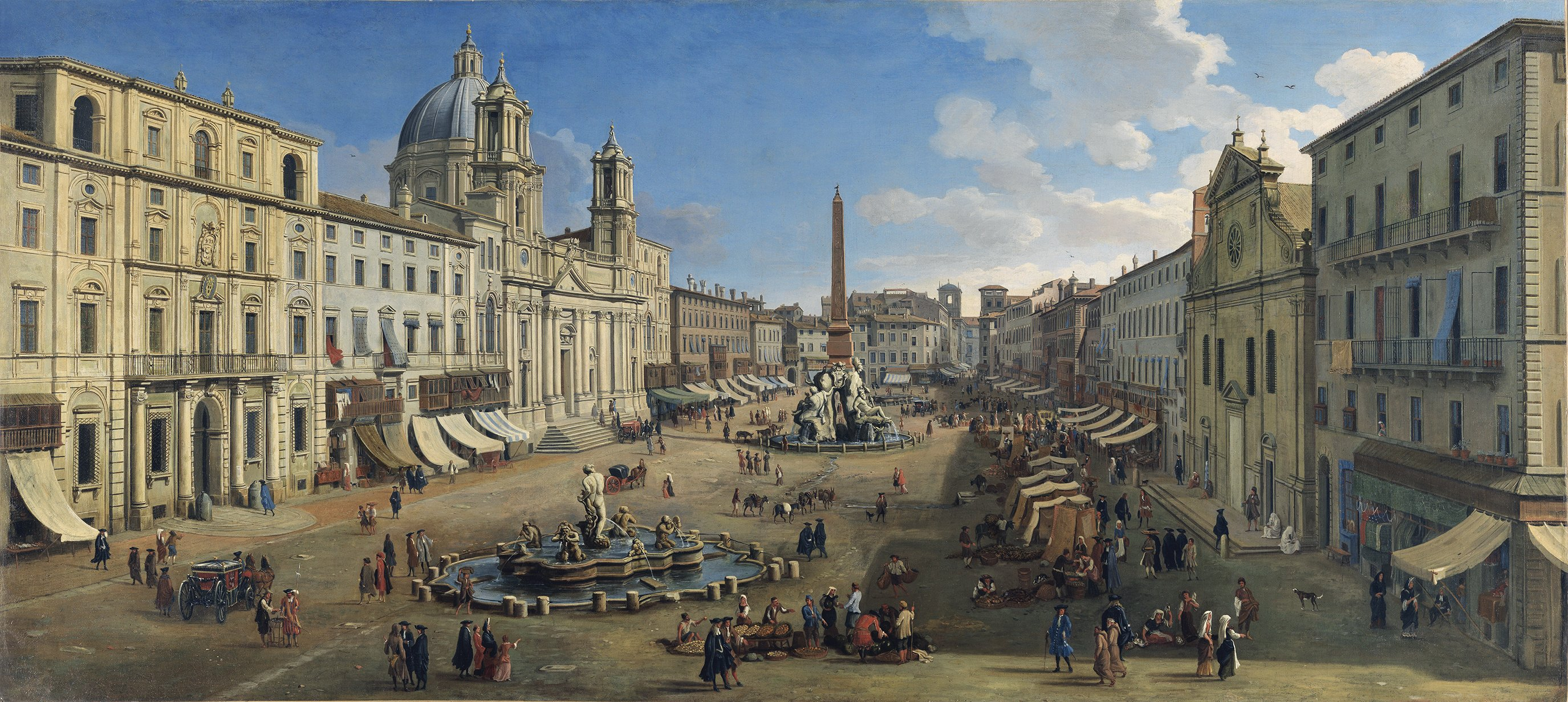
Piazza Navona, Rome

His first extant works were made in Hoorn in 1672 to where he had fled after the French invasion and occupation of Amersfoort in the Rampjaar. He returned to Amersfoort where he was active until 1674, the year in which he left for Italy together with his friend Jacob van Staverden, another pupil of Withoos.

Like his former teacher Withoos, he joined the Bentvueghels, an association of mainly Dutch and Flemish artists working in Rome. His nickname in the Bentveughels was "Piktoors" (Pitch-torch) or "Toorts van Amersfoort" (Torch of Amersfoort). He was also nicknamed ‘Gasparo dagli Occhiali’ (Gaspare with the spectacles). He worked in Rome together with the Flemish painter Abraham Genoels and may even have been his pupil. Other collaborators included Hendrik Frans van Lint who would become one of the leading vedute painters in the first half of the 18th century.

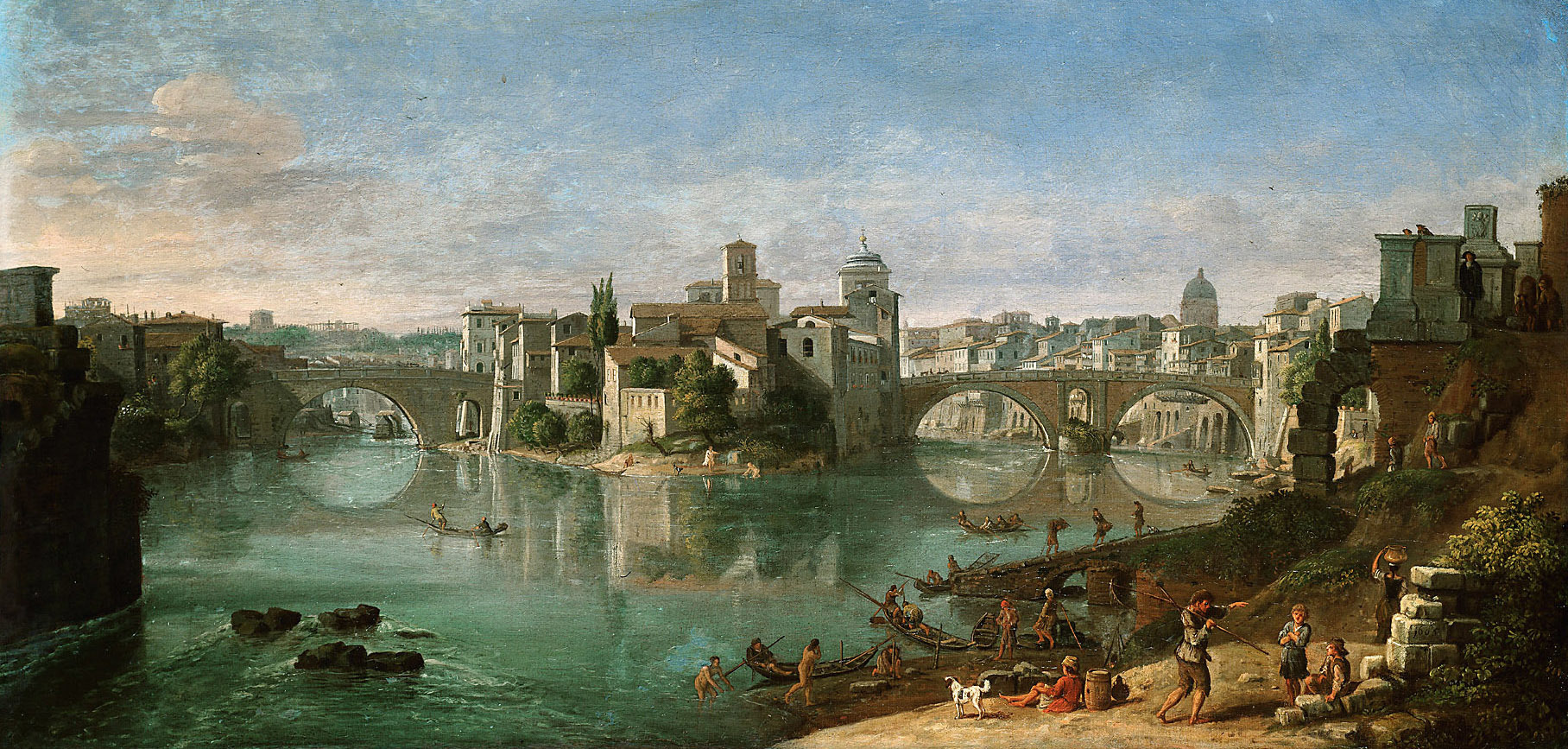
View of the Tiber in Rome

In 1697 van Wittel married Anna Lorenzani. His first son Luigi was born in 1700. Luigi became a famous architect and used the italianized family name of Vanvitelli. A second son was born in 1702.

Van Wittel spent almost all his life in Italy where he arrived in 1674 and died in 1736. He lived mainly in Rome but, particularly between 1694 and 1710, he also toured the country and painted in Florence, Bologna, Ferrara, Venice, Milan, Piacenza, Urbino, and Naples. He became member of the Accademia di San Luca in Rome in 1711. He made his last dated work in 1730.

== Work ==
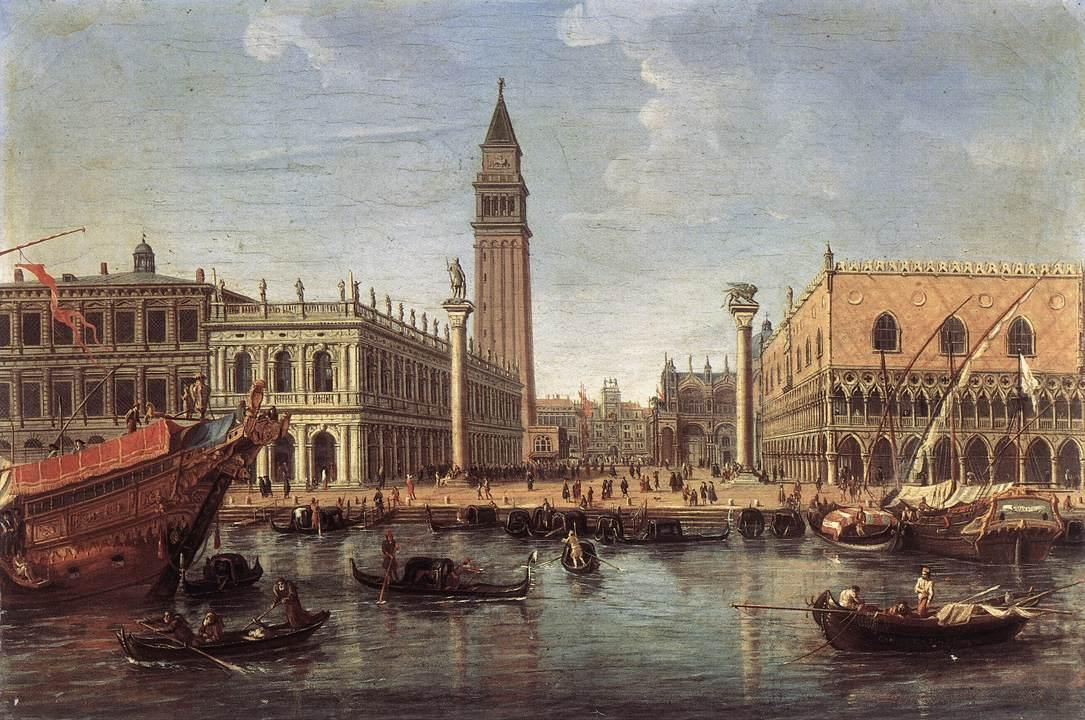
View of the Piazzetta from St Mark's Basin

Van Wittel is one of the principal painters of topographical views known as vedute. He is credited with turning topography into a painterly specialism in Italian art. He may have been influenced by the drawings of the Flemish draughtsman Lieven Cruyl who had produced a series of cityscapes of Rome in the 1660s. He is also considered to have influenced one of the major Italian vedutisti, the Venetian painter Canaletto. Some of the views he painted during his visit to Venice around 1697 anticipate Canaletto in their perspective layout and in the angle in which the scene is presented. An example is the View of the Piazzetta from St Mark's Basin (Doria Pamphilj Gallery, Rome).

When van Wittel first arrived in Rome he drew 50 drawings illustrating the Dutch hydraulic engineer Cornelis Meyer's designs for restoring navigability to the River Tiber between Rome and Perugia. His first vedute also originated from his collaboration with Meyer, who used drawings by van Wittel to illustrate one of his tracts with a series of engraved Roman views. Van Wittel used some of these drawings for tempera and oil vedute dating from the early 1680s. His style of vedute was formed about 10 years later.

Crypta Neapolitana

His work developed from that of the Dutch Italianate painters, whose work incorporated Roman ruins and other Roman sights. Their paintings always placed architecture within the surrounding landscape. Van Wittel's approach was derived from this and as result his views show buildings from a distance. He showed large architectural complexes in an overall view. His work should therefore be seen as a mixture of landscape and urban architecture painting rather than simple vedute. It is possible that he relied on the aid of a camera obscura in drawing his vedute.

His compositional and perspectival principles remained the same from the 1690s, only the subject matter changed. His work was very popular with travellers on their Grand Tour of Italy. Thomas Coke, the future 1st Earl of Leicester and builder of Holkham Hall, Norfolk, acquired at least seven vedute by van Wittel during his Grand Tour in the years 1715 and 1716.
