= Johannes Voorhout =

Dutch painter

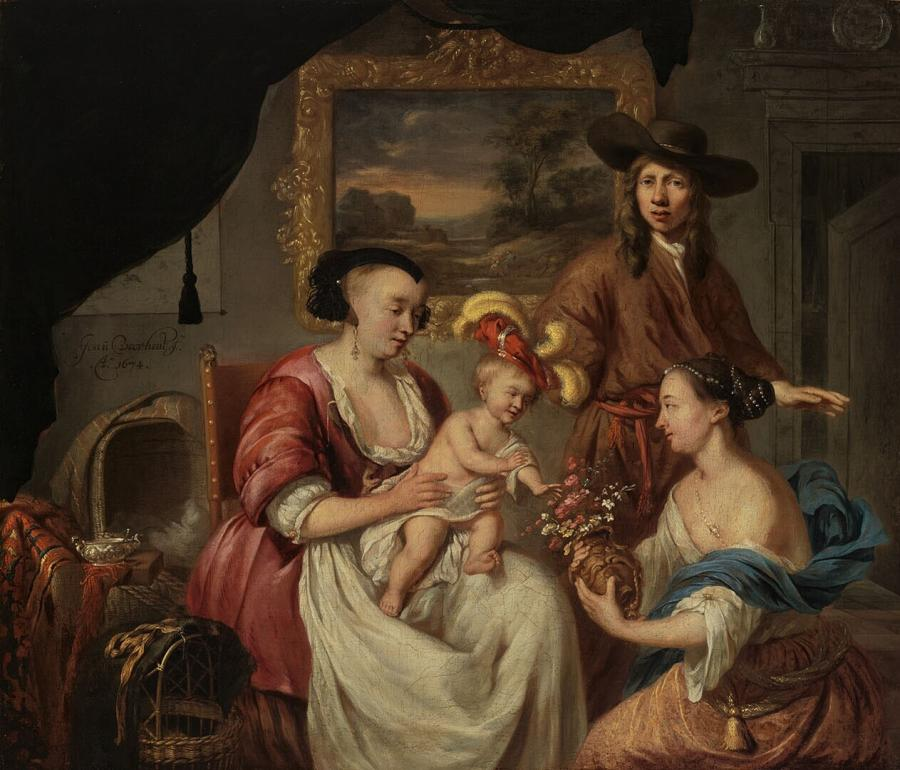
- Voorhout and his family in 1674 by Johannes Voorhout
- Born: 11 November 1647; Uithoorn, Dutch Republic
- Died: 25 August 1717 (aged 69); Amsterdam, Dutch Republic
- Education: Juriaan Ovens; Jan van Noordt
- Known for: Painting

Johannes Voorhout (11 November 1647 – 25 August 1717) was a Dutch painter of history paintings, portraits and genre scenes. After training in the Dutch Republic he worked for a number of years in Hamburg before returning to work in Amsterdam.

== Life ==
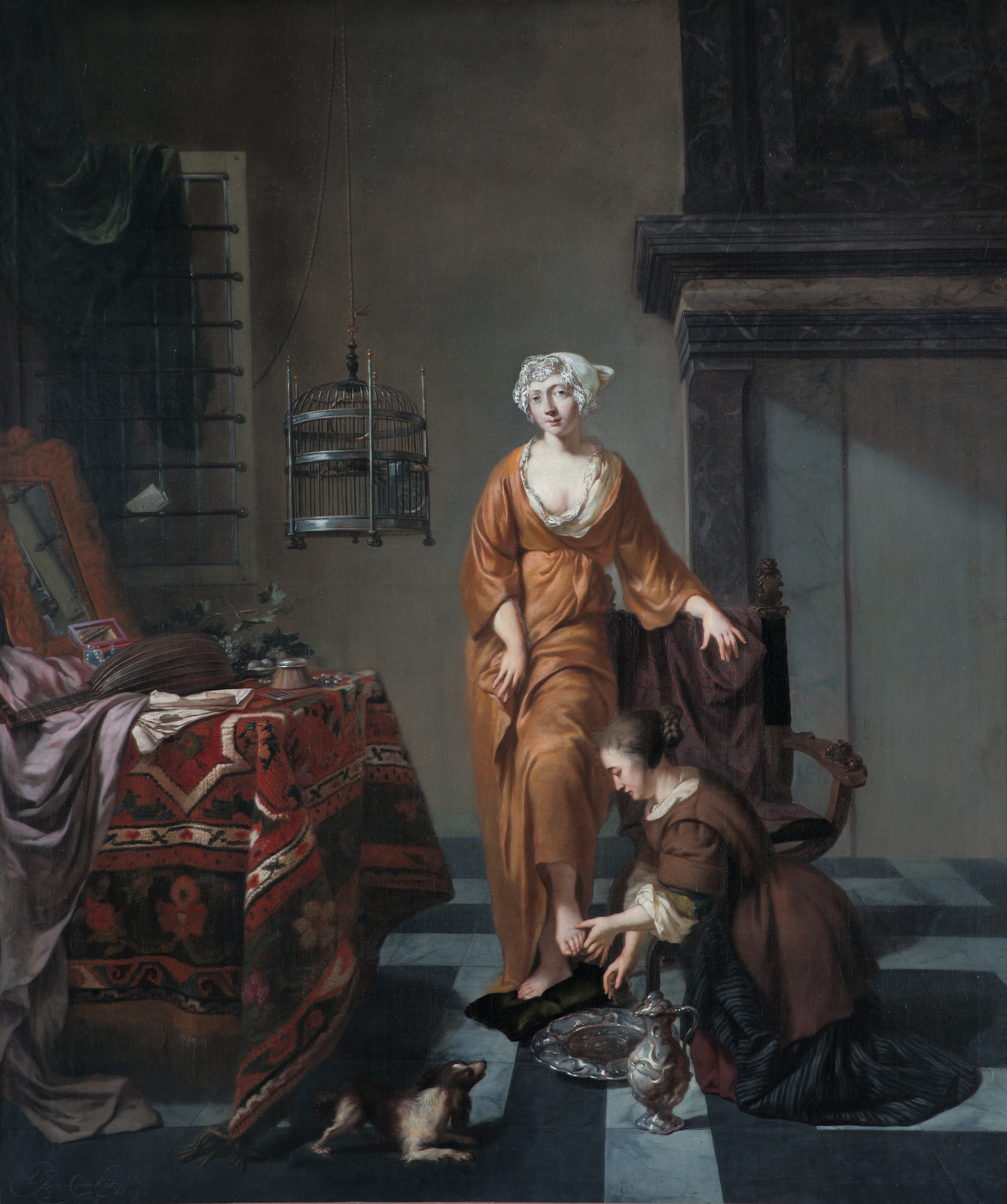
A Lady with a servant washing her feet, ca. 1690–1700

Voorhout was born in Uithoorn, North Holland, as the son of the Amsterdam clock maker Cornelis Voorhout. Seeing that his son was better suited to drawing than the technical aspects of watch making, he apprenticed him to Constantijn Verhout in Gouda. Verhout was a painter of modern history scenes. After six years, Voorhout returned to Amsterdam in 1664. Here he worked for the next five years in the workshop of Jan van Noordt, a prominent history and portrait painter. He married in 1670 Margaretha Vos. The couple had two children: circa 1676 Johannes II was born in Hamburg. The son studied painting under his father and was also a musician. About ten years later a daughter (Cornelia).

In 1672, worried about the impending invasion by the French, he fled the country with his family and settled in Friedrichstadt, which had a large Dutch population and where his wife had friends. He worked for the court in Gottorf, probably painting decorative works. In Hamburg, he met the painter Juriaan Ovens, who was a presumed pupil of Rembrandt. Ovens invited him to work for him. Voorhout turned down his offer but followed his advice to try his luck in Hamburg. There he was quite successful, and that is where his son Johannes was born in 1677.

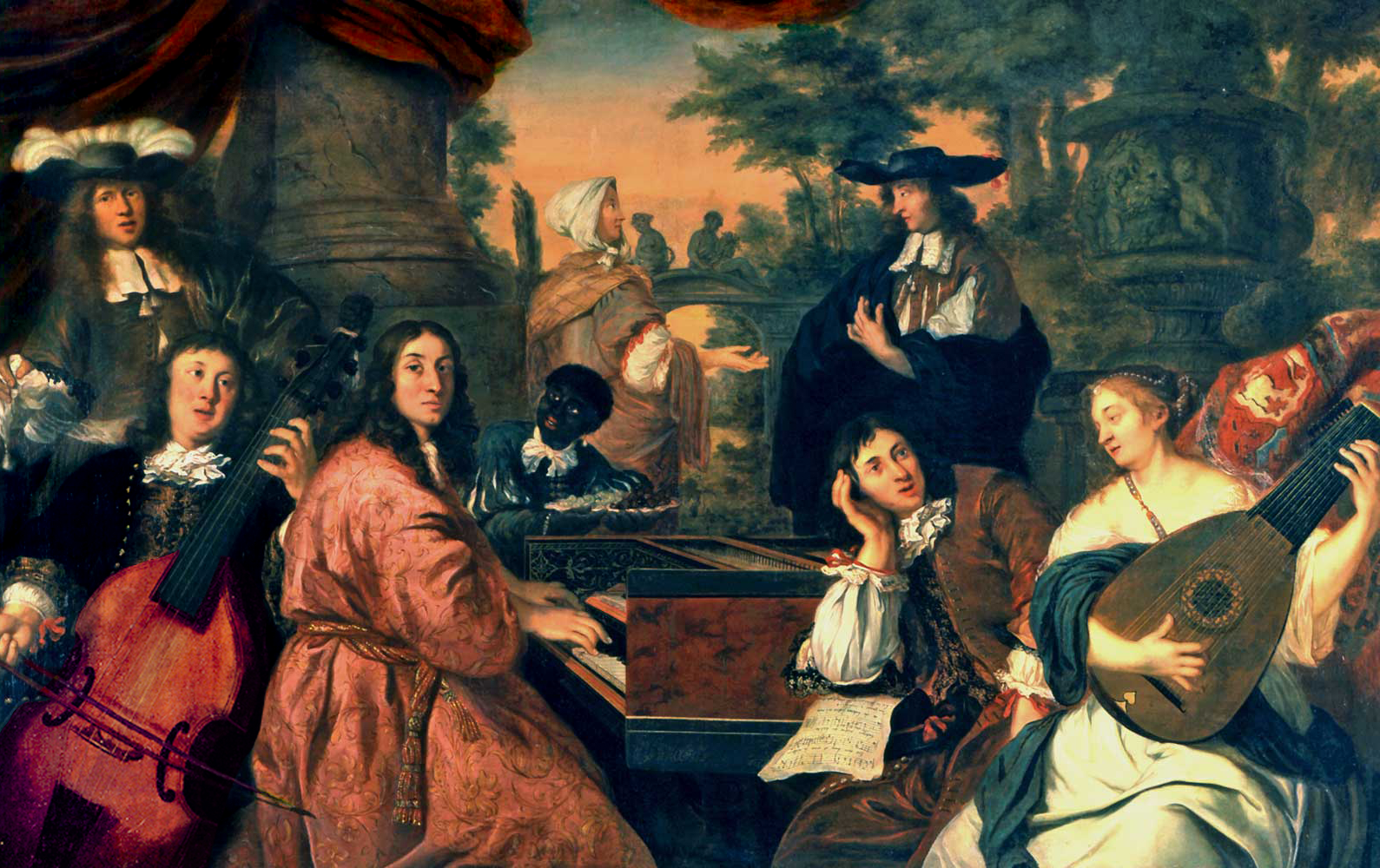
Elegant company making music , 1674

He returned in 1677 to Amsterdam where he started his own workshop. He taught his son Johannes II, and Ernst Stuven, but never had the success that he had enjoyed in Hamburg. According to the early Dutch biographer Arnold Houbraken, his lack of success was partially due to his high output, which gave prospective customers the impression that is work was not that valuable, and partially due to his lack of skill in presenting his works in a manner attractive to his customers. It was more likely that he had difficulty because the market in Amsterdam was much more competitive than in Hamburg, due to the high number of competent painters.

He became a citizen of Amsterdam in 1707 and died in the city and was buried on 25 August 1717.

== Work ==
Voorhout painted genre scenes, individual and group portraits, allegories, Christian religious subjects and mythological scenes.

As a portrait painter he is known for his large equestrian portrait of the Stadthouder William III (Groninger Museum). He painted it for Dirck Clant of Groningen, the lord of the Castle Hanckema. The work was placed in his castle near Groningen as an over-the-mantel piece. and was later used in the 1930s as a model for the Dutch 500 guilder note.

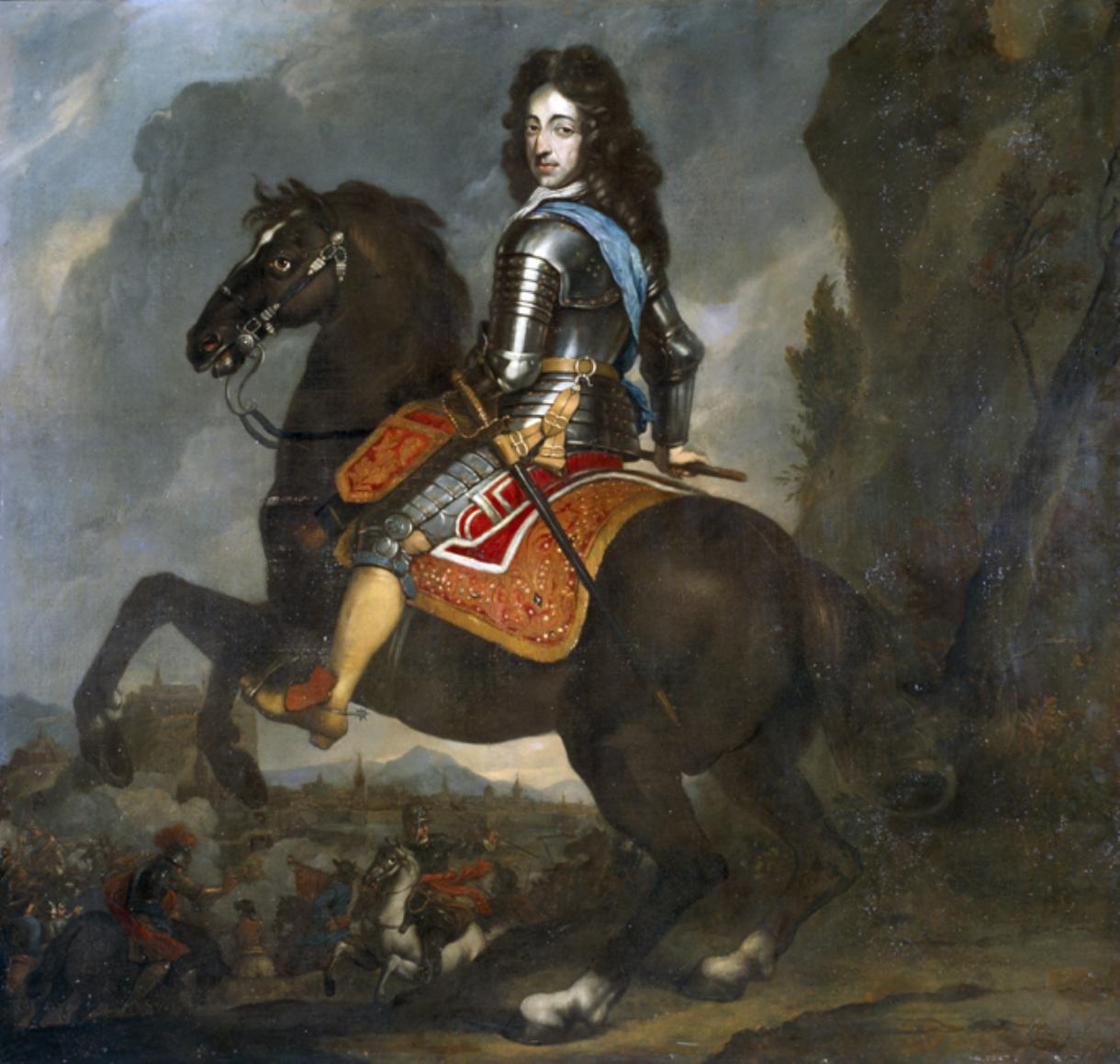
Equestrian Portrait of Stadthouder William III, Groninger Museum

He painted group portraits such as the Elegant company making music (1674, History of Hamburg Museum). Voorhout may have included in this painting a self-portrait as the man in the feathered hat. A dedication "to brothers Buxtehude and Joh: Adam Reink" is now thought to identify the gamba player Buxtehude and the keyboard player Johann Adam Reinken. The identification of the boy holding a canon as Johann Theile has been thrown into doubt by the recent discovery of a portrait of Theile in Lübeck.

== Museums with Voorhout's works ==
- Rijksmuseum, Amsterdam, Netherlands
- Amsterdams Historisch Museum, Amsterdam, Netherlands
- The State Hermitage Museum, St. Petersburg, Russia
- Bowes Museum, Barnard Castle, Teesdale, County Durham, England
- Hatchlands Park, East Clandon, Surrey, England
- Museum Boijmans Van Beuningen, Rotterdam, Netherlands
- Centraal Museum, Utrecht, Netherlands
- Groninger Museum, Groningen, Netherlands
- King John III Palace Museum, Wilanów, Warsaw, Poland
- Museum of Fine Arts, Budapest, Budapest, Hungary
- Nationalmuseum, Stockholm, Sweden
- Museum für Hamburgische Geschichte, Hamburg, Germany
- Worcester Art Museum, Worcester, Massachusetts
