= Elias van den Broeck =

Dutch still life painter

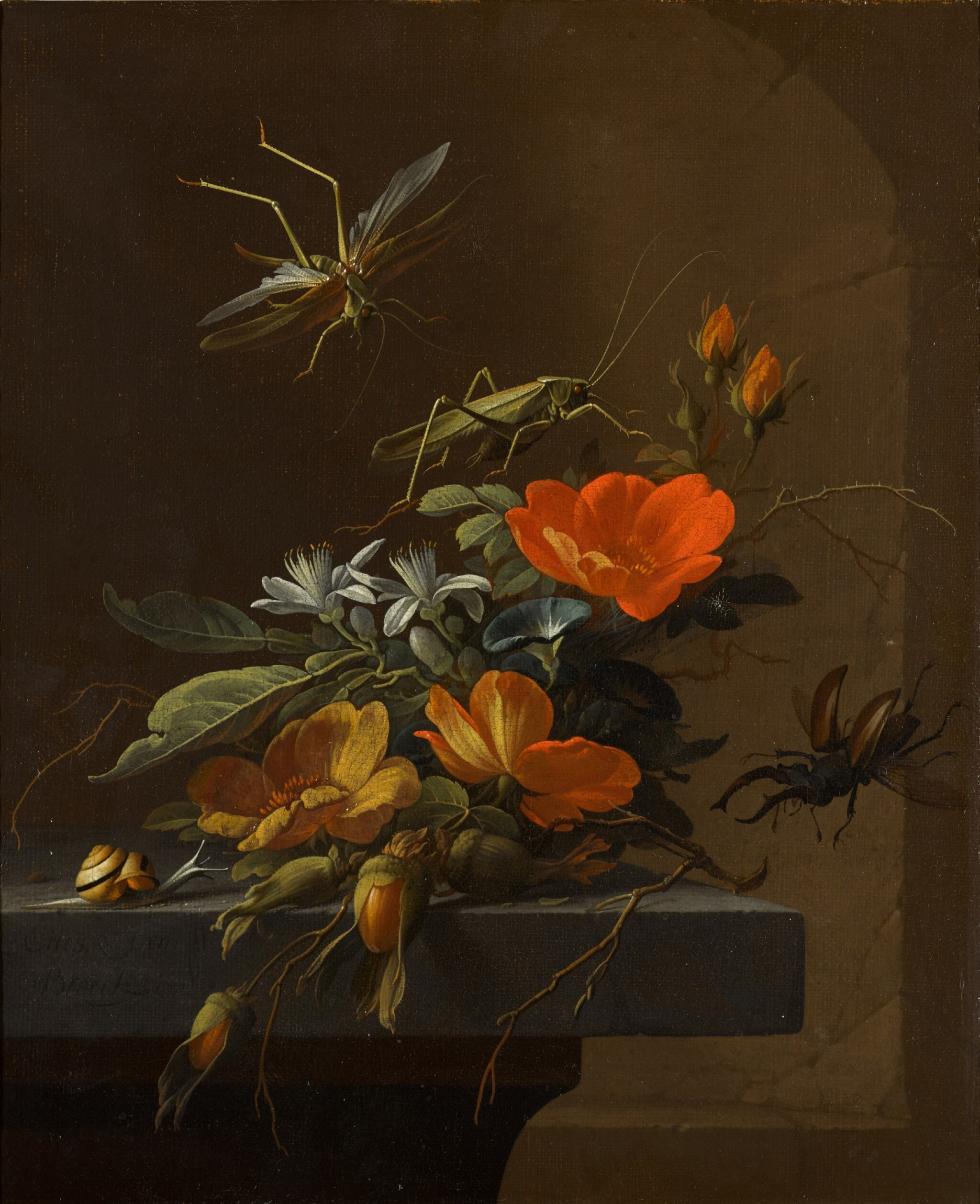
Still life of Austrian briars and other flowers on a stone plinth

Elias van den Broeck (c. 1652 in probably in Amsterdam – buried 6 February 1708 in Amsterdam) was a Dutch still life painter mainly known for his flower pieces. He trained in the Dutch Republic and worked for some time in Antwerp in the Habsburg Netherlands where he had moved with his master Jan Davidsz. de Heem. He later returned to Amsterdam where he was successful as a flower painter. He also painted fruit pieces, forest floor pieces, mushroom pieces and banquet still lifes.

== Life ==
He was likely born in 1652 in Amsterdam as the son of Jan van den Broeck (Paludanus) (1618 - 1678) and Susanna van Diependaal (1634 - 1655) who had married the year prior. When his mother died when he was only 7 years old, his father placed him in the care of an orphanage with a substantial monetary settlement. He initially apprenticed with a goldsmith.

In 1665 he became a pupil of Cornelis Kick in Amsterdam, and in 1669 he became a pupil of Jan Davidsz. de Heem in Utrecht. He is registered in a document stating his intention to go to Italy in 1672, but it is likely he never made the trip. In 1673 he accompanied de Heem to Antwerp, where he became a master in the Guild of St. Luke there. On 10 October 1674 he signed a deed in which he committed himself to work for a year for the art dealer Bartholomeus Floquet. He married Marie Leenaerts in Antwerp on 5 October 1677. The couple had three children: Jan (baptized 13 August 1678), Francisca Maria (baptized 22 December 1679 and Elias (baptized 5 July 1685).

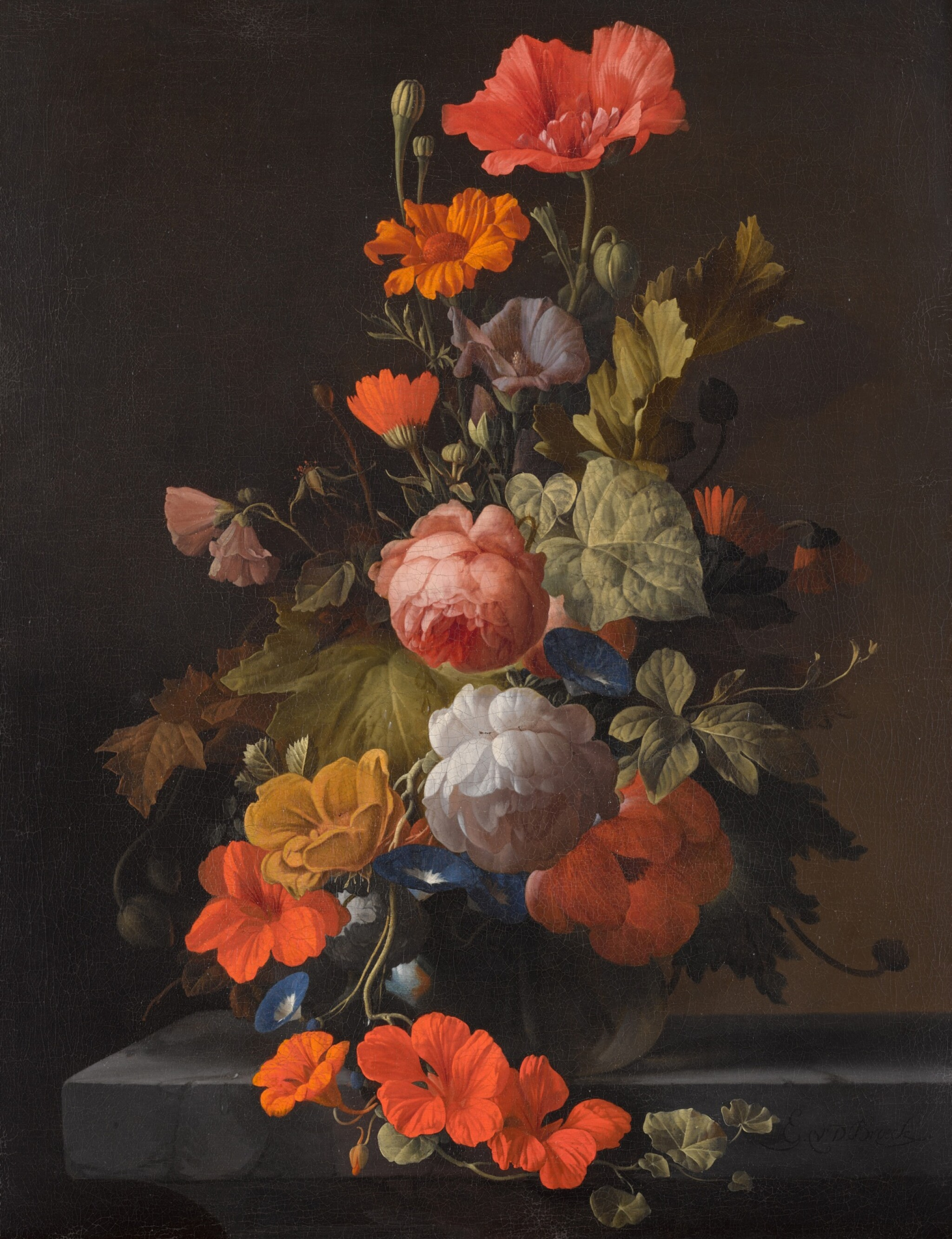
Flowers with ants in a glass vase

In 1685 he returned to Amsterdam, where he lived outside the Utrechtse Poort on the Amstel beyond the Bergenvaarderskamer'. From 1689 onwards, several children were baptized in the Catholic church at the Kuiperspad.

His pupil Philip van Kouwenbergh became a respected flower painter.

== Work ==
Van den Broeck is mainly known for his flower pieces. He also painted fruit pieces, forest floor pieces, mushroom pieces and banquet still lifes. His early works show the influence of his first master Cornelis Kick. His banquet still lifes were influenced by his second master Jan Davidsz. de Heem. Like de Heem, he accentuated the sharpness of the flowers by adding a very fine outline in white or grey. The influence of Willem van Aelst is apparent in the diagonal composition of his flower pieces.

Despite these various influences, van den Broeck created a distinctive personal style. This personal touch is visible in his flower pieces in which he evoked an evening atmosphere with strong lighting effects.
