= Willem van Aelst =

Golden Age painter from the Northern Netherlands (1627–1683)

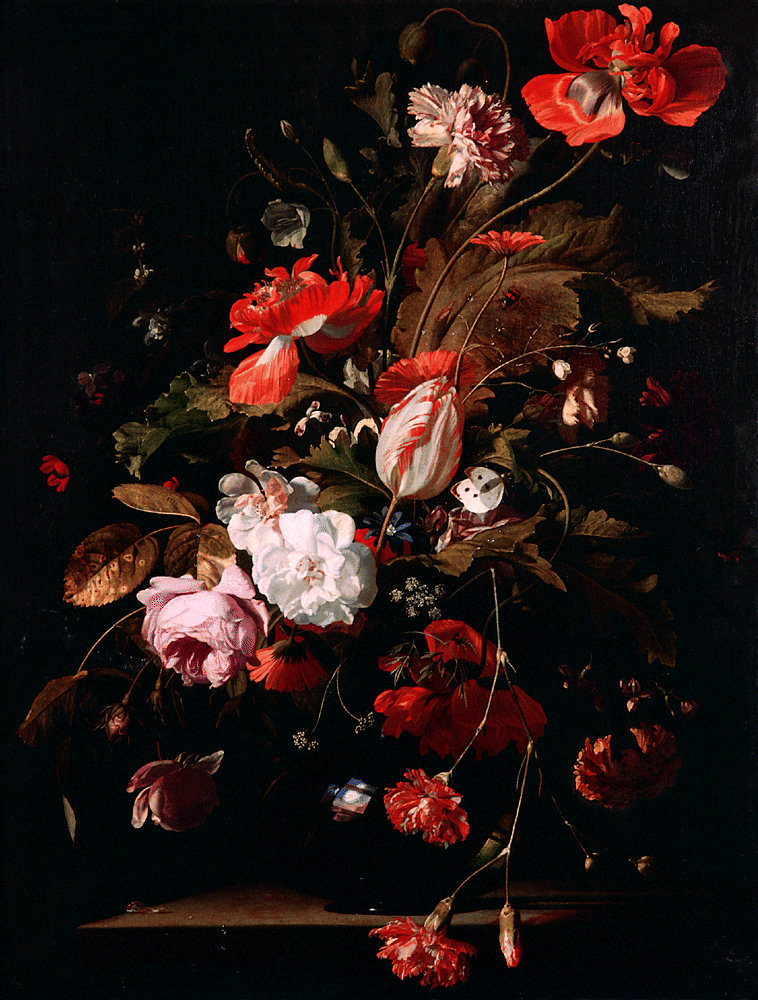
Still Life with Flowers, 1665, Musée Thomas-Henry, Cherbourg-en-Cotentin

Willem van Aelst (16 May 1627 – buried 22 May 1683) was a Dutch Golden Age artist who specialized in still-life painting with flowers or game.

== Biography ==
Van Aelst was born in Delft to a family of prominent city magistrates. He learned to paint from his uncle, the still-life painter Evert van Aelst. On 9 November 1643 he enrolled as a master of the Guild of Saint Luke at Delft.

Between 1645 and 1649 he lived in France. In 1649 Van Aelst travelled to Florence, where he served as court painter to Ferdinando II de' Medici, grand duke of Tuscany. Here he was known as Guillielmo d'Olanda. At this time, the grand duke also employed two fellow Dutchmen Matthias Withoos and Otto Marseus van Schrieck, the latter also a still-life painter who probably influenced Van Aelst's style. Ferdinando II publicly presented Van Aelst with a gold chain and medal, as a testimony of his approbation and an acknowledgement of his talents.

It has been conjectured that Van Aelst visited Rome where he became a member of the Bentvueghels, an association of mainly Dutch and Flemish artists active in Rome. This conjecture is based, not very convincingly, on his practice during the years 1657/58 to sign his works with his name followed by: ‘alias (and a drawn stick figure)'. Some interpreted this as a reference to a Bent name (the nickname that a member of the Bentvueghels would adopt) – De Vogelverschrikker (Dutch for 'scarecrow') – but there are no documents confirming this.

In 1656 he returned to the Netherlands to settle permanently in Amsterdam. He became one of the most prominent still-life painters of his generation, which allowed him to live on the Prinsengracht. He must have at Amsterdam died in 1683 or shortly thereafter, as his latest dated work is from that year. Van Aelst taught Rachel Ruysch, Isaac Denies, Maria van Oosterwijck, and Ernst Stuven.

== Legacy ==
Van Aelst has paintings in public collections including thirteen paintings in public collections in the United Kingdom.

== Selected works ==
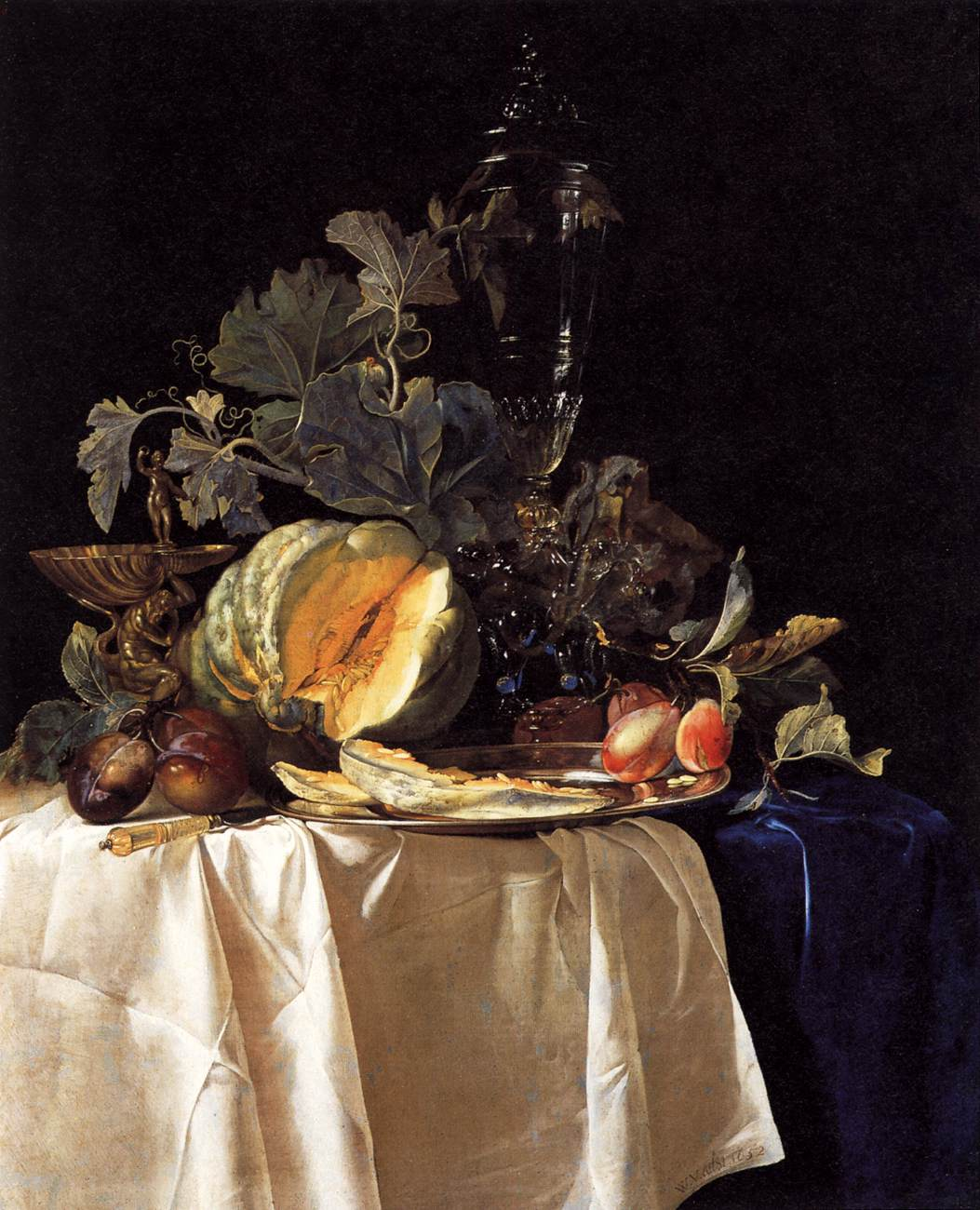
Still-Life with Fruit and Crystal Vase, 1652, Palazzo Pitti, Florence.

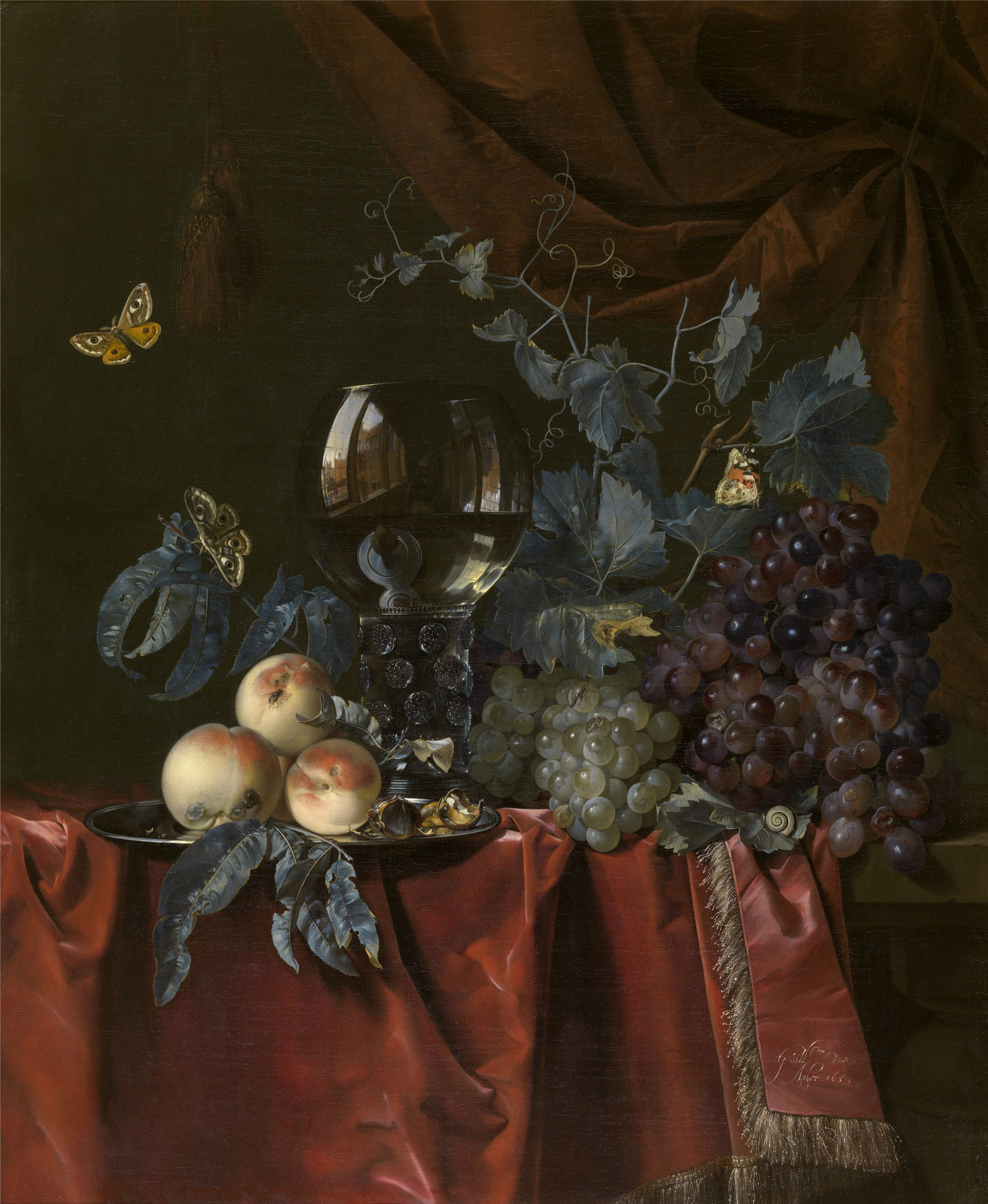
Still-Life with wine glass, 1659, Koninklijk Museum voor Schone Kunsten Antwerpen, Antwerp.

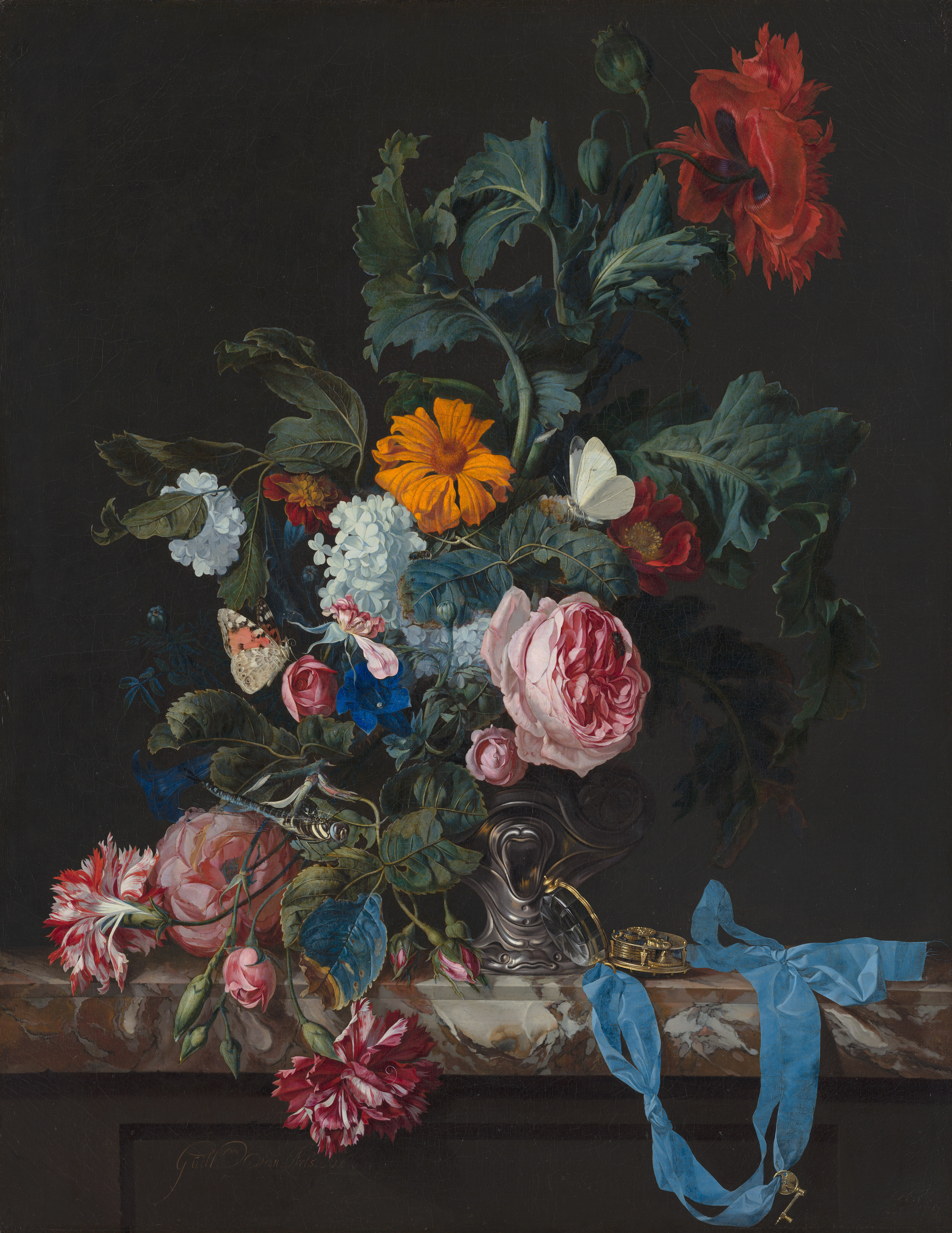
Flower Still- Life with a Timepiece, 1663, Mauritshuis, The Hague.

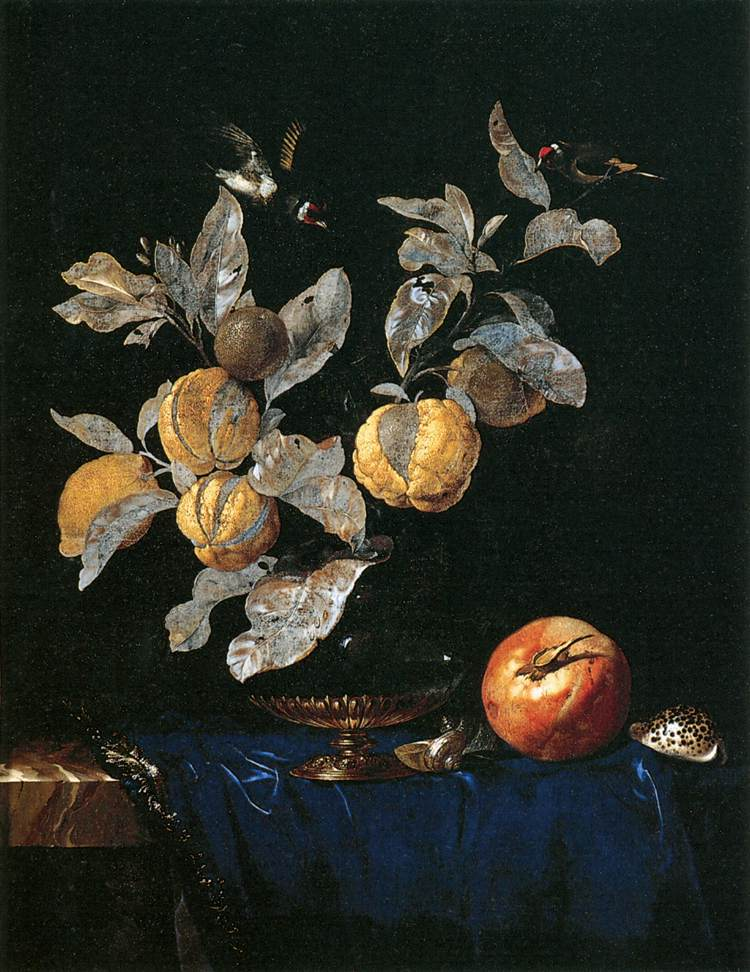
Still-Life with Fruit, 1664, Museo Thyssen-Bornemisza, Madrid.

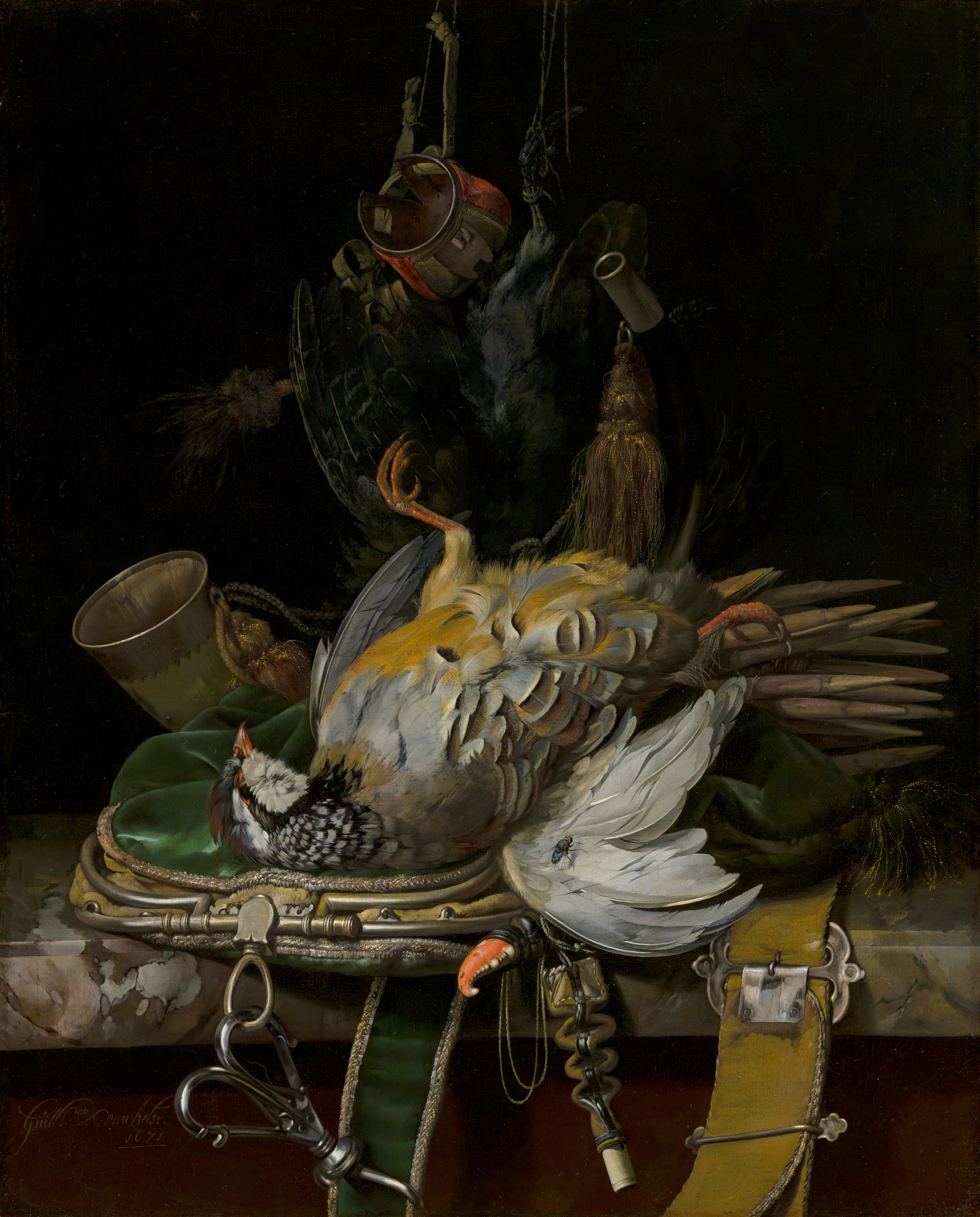
Still Life with Partridges, 1671, Mauritshuis, The Hague.
