= Alida Withoos =

Dutch artist (c. 1661/62–1730)

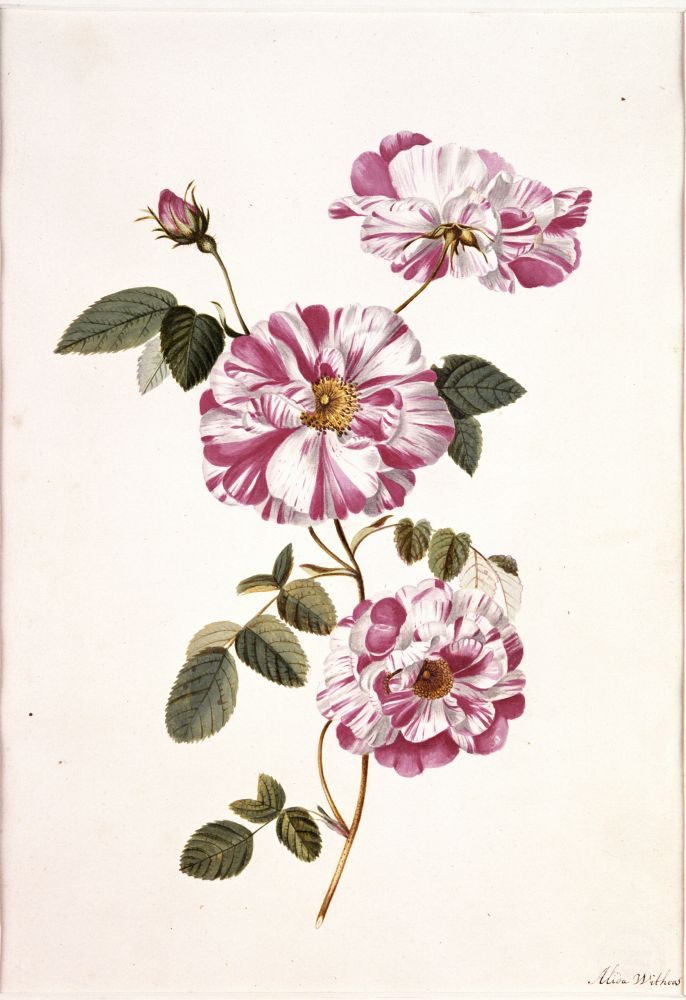
Alida Withoos, French Rose, about 1690-1750, watercolor on paper, Wageningen University & Research-Library

Alida Withoos (c. 1660/62 – 5 December 1730 (buried)) was a Dutch botanical artist and painter. She was the daughter of the painter Matthias Withoos. She is best known for her botanical watercolors commissioned for two major collaborative illustration projects: Agnes Block's florilegium as well as the Moninckx Atlas.

== Life ==
Alida Withoos was born in Amersfoort. Because of the invasion of Utrecht by the French, the family moved to Hoorn in 1672. In 1701, Alida married the Fijnschilder Andries Cornelisz van Dalen, a typical example of relations between artistic and painterly families in seventeenth and eighteenth century Holland.

== Education ==
During her lifetime, women were excluded from universities and guilds. However, daughters from artistic families could be trained to work in the studio of their father, uncle, brother or spouse, often under his name. Along with her siblings, Johannes, Pieter, Frans, and Maria, she was trained by her father in painting still lifes and botanical illustrations. Unlike her husband, brothers and sister, Alida acquired a certain reputation painting under her own name, principally due to her botanical images. In Hoorn a number of the Withoos children were active as artists of flowers, birds, butterflies and insects. In inventories, such images were regularly called "Withoosjes".

== Career ==
Alida was – with her brother Pieter – one of the many artists commissioned by Agnes Block to paint specimens at her estate called Vijverhof. Withoos painted these specimens during various stages of life by observing them in person, which she was able to achieve due to her residency at Block's estate. Although it is considered lost, one of her notable works was made during this residency; in 1687, she painted the first pineapple bred in Europe, which was grown in Block's hot house in her garden.

The hortus medicus in Amsterdam, modernly named Hortus Botanicus (where plants brought back in the ships of the Dutch East India Company were grown) commissioned paintings of plants for the Moninckx Atlas. Out of the 420 water colours created for the atlas, thirteen were painted by Alida in 1694. She was paid 4 guilders per painting, the same rate as her male/female colleagues.

Published in 1718, Arnold Houbraken's book, The Great Theatre of Dutch Painters and Paintresses, is a compilation of biographies of well-known 17th Century Dutch artists. Twenty-four women were named in it, including Alida, giving us a sense of her popularity during her lifetime.

The Library of Wageningen University owns a book of drawings bought by the collector Simon Schijnvoet that includes 7 by Alida Withoos, perhaps made for Block.

== Style ==
Both Matthias and Alida took inspiration from the "sottobosco" (forest floor still life) which Otto Marseus van Schrieck (c.1619-78) brought to the Netherlands. Like Van Schrieck's work, their compositions combine art and science, including plants, wildlife and vegetation.

In many of Alida's illustrations, there is a notable "S-curve". This is a clear stylistic decision since the plants themselves do not have this attribute.

== Death ==
She was buried in the Westerkerk in Amsterdam.
