= Pieter Withoos =

Dutch Golden Age painter

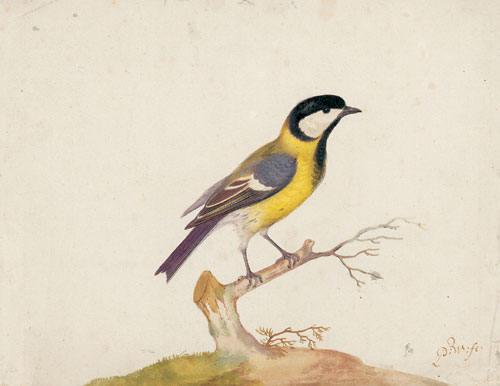
Parus major

Pieter Withoos (1655 – 23 April 1692), was a Dutch Golden Age painter.

Withoos was born in Amersfoort. According to Houbraken he was the second son of Mathias Withoos, brother to the painters Johannes, Frans and Alida Withoos. He painted flowers and all sorts of small insects and animals in watercolours, mostly for albums of garden art collectors.

According to the RKD he moved with his family to Hoorn in the rampjaar, 1672. He died in Amsterdam.
