= Matthias Withoos =

Dutch painter (1627–1703)

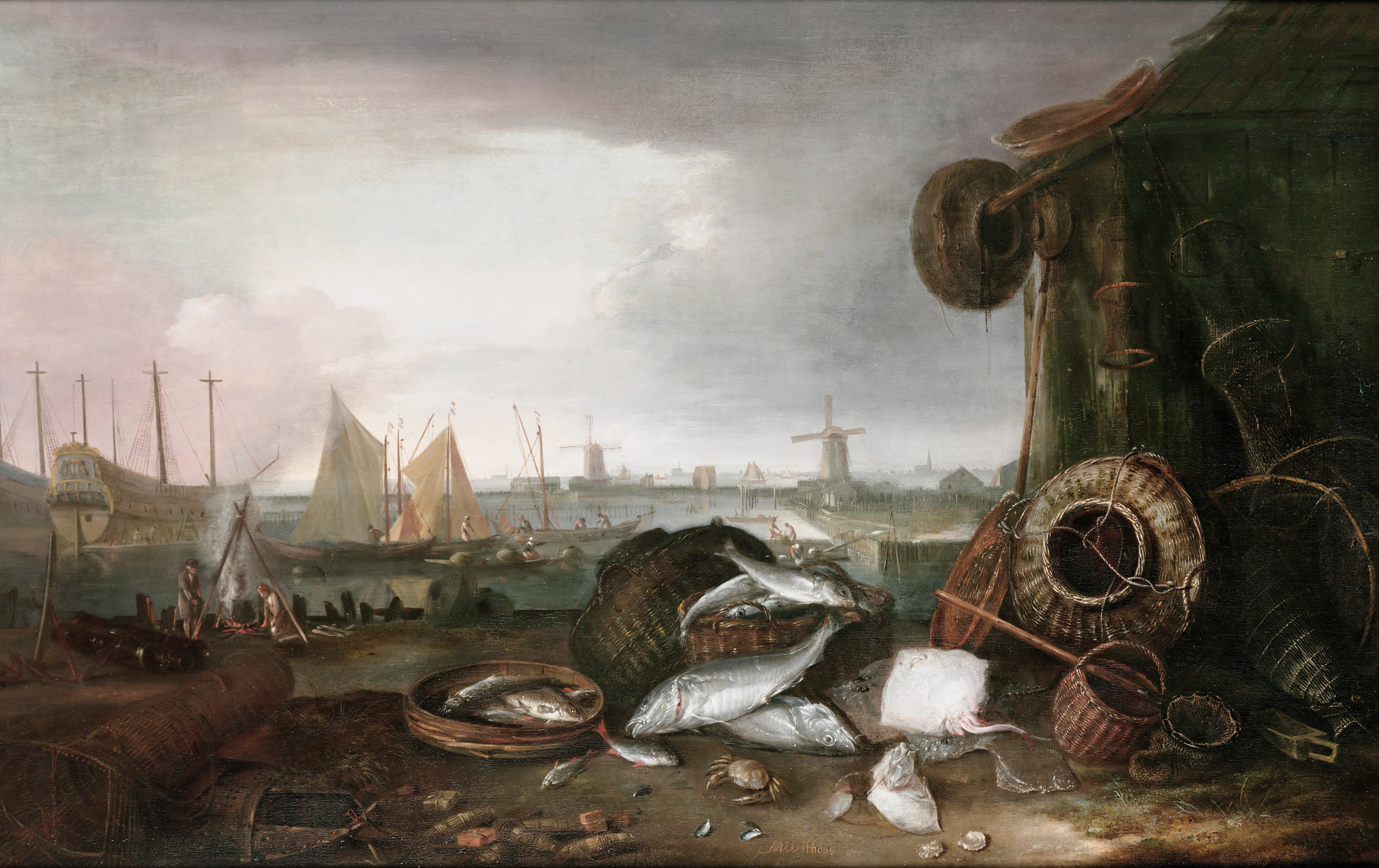
De Grashaven

Matthias Withoos (1627–1703), also known as Calzetta Bianca and Calzetti, was a Dutch painter of still lifes and city scenes, best known for the details of insects, reptiles and undergrowth in the foreground of his pictures.

== Life ==
Withoos was born in Amersfoort. He studied under Jacob van Campen, at his painters' school just outside the city at his country house, and then with Otto Marseus van Schrieck. When he was 21, Withoos made a trip to Rome with van Schrieck, and Willem van Aelst. In Rome they joined the group of northern artists known as the "Bentvueghels" ("Birds of a feather"), and Withoos went by the alias "Calzetta Bianca" ("White Hose") — a translation of his name into Italian. Withoos' work caught the eye of the cardinal Leopoldo de Medici, who commissioned various paintings from him.

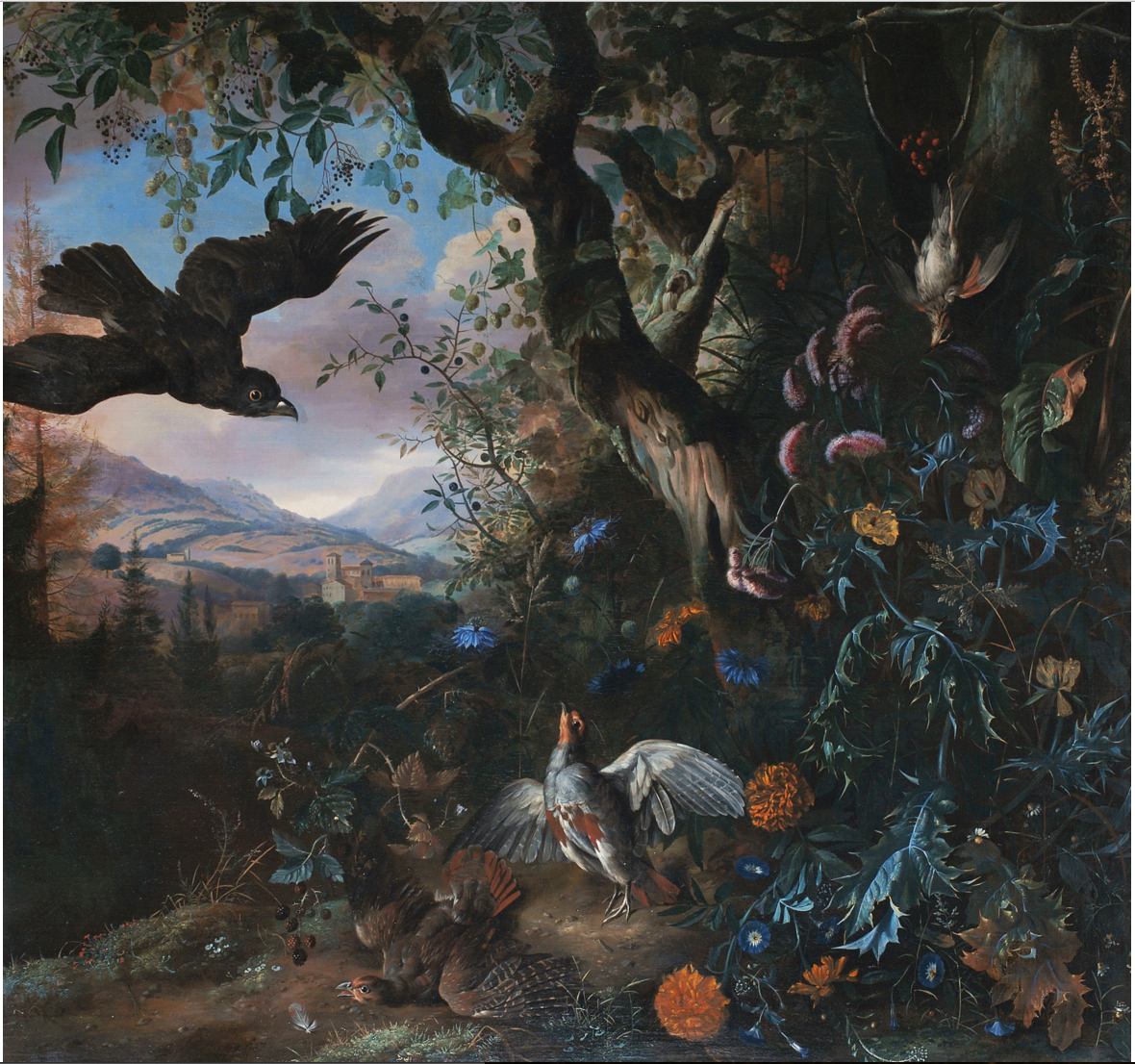
Landscape with birds and flowers in the underbrush of a wood'

In 1653, the artist returned to Amersfoort. When French troops occupied Amersfoort in the "Disastrous Year" of 1672, Withoos fled from Amersfoort to Hoorn, where he would remain until his death in 1703. Many of Withoos' seven children also followed in his footsteps, including the botanical artist Alida Withoos.

Following the artist's career as a painter of cityscapes, his student Caspar van Wittel was instrumental in developing the genre of architecture vedute in Rome. Jacob van Staverden was possibly also one of his pupils.

== Works ==
Still life paintings by Withoos, like those of his teacher Van Schrieck, are notable for their close-ups of dark and mysterious wild plants and undergrowth inhabited by insects, reptiles and other creatures from the natural world. These paintings, many of which have a vanitas motif, were popular with collectors of cabinet paintings.

Additionally, he painted numerous large cityscapes, such as the View of the city of Amersfoort acquired in 2001 by the Museum Flehite in Amersfoort. This work of a size of 2.5 x 4 m was the largest city view in the Netherlands. Two versions of "De Grashaven" were in the collection of the Westfries Museum in Hoorn until they were stolen at the end of 2005.
