= Les Vélins du Roi =

Compendium of 6984 plant and animal paintings started in 1631

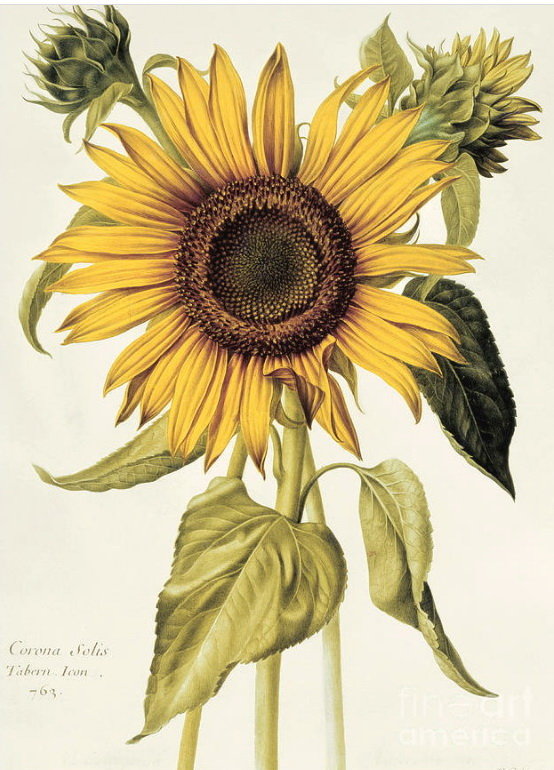
Helianthus annuus by Nicolas Robert

Les Vélins du Roi (The King's Vellums) is a collection of 6984 paintings of plants and animals started in 1631 to document specimens from the royal garden and animal collection. Foremost illustrators contributed to the codex during the reigns of Louis XIII, Louis XIV and Louis XV, and the codex was finally entrusted to the Muséum national d'histoire naturelle in 1793, where it still is.

According to Ernest Hamy, the Muséum has a "collection of flowers painted by Jean Le Roy de la Boissière", 1610, consisting of 44 watercolour-illuminated vellums, 39 cm × 29 cm; reference Ms 2224) acquired for the Muséum in 1888 by Joseph Deniker. These pages are “sometimes decorated on one side only, and sometimes on both sides, with very fine paintings representing flowers, insects, etc.”. Le Roy devotes some twenty pages to tulips (including several wild tulips), presents a few fruits (including tomatoes and red peppers), and adds a few insects and snails here and there.

A smaller vellum (31.1 cm by 20.2 cm) depicting an iris made in Poitiers (where Le Roy lived) in 1608 by one Van Kuyk, a pupil of van Kessel appears in the Cleveland Museum of Art which presents it as a page from a florilegium commissioned by Le Roy in 1608 and illustrated by several artists, perhaps including himself. Hamy recalls that Le Roy's talent was celebrated by the poet and apothecary Paul Contant, who said: "Du Sieur de la Boissière, Architas Poitevin, / Timanthe sans égal, dont la dextre savante, / fait tout ce que nature à notre œil représente (Jardin poétique, p. 83).

In the same article, Hamy mentions Daniel Rabel, painter, engraver, miniaturist and botanist. From 1618, Rabel painted his Suite de fleurs (1624, referred to on Gallica as a Collection of flowers and insects drawn and painted in miniature on vellum.). The volume contains one hundred vellums, 239 painted images of plants (mainly tulips, but also anemones, narcissi and yucca) and 32 of insects. The work entered the royal collections in 1783.

1622 saw the publication of Theatrum florae In quo ex toto orbe selecti mirabiles venustiores ac praecipui flores tanquam ab ipsus deae sinu proferuntur: 69 engraved plates of flowers and insects. Some of the plates were illuminated. According to Hamy, the same collection was presented to the public in 1627, attributed to Pierre Firens (the king's engraver and embroiderer), then in 1633 to Pierre Mariette (Jean Mariette's grand-father). Although the Suite was published later, it seems that the engravings were based on the miniatures.

It seems that the museum also has six vellum prints dated 1631 and 1632 that could be by Daniel Rabel ('Tulipe panachée flamboyante' and 'Colombine de Chartres', etc. Colombine is an old word for aquilegia).

The painter-miniaturist Nicolas Robert worked for Gaston, Duke of Orléans (brother of King Louis XIII) from 1631, after the miniatures he painted for the famous Guirlande de Julie (1641) had made him famous. The Prince, who had no doubt employed Rabel, took him into his service to produce miniatures on vellum after the plants grown in the Jardin du Luxembourg, then (1645) in the garden of the Château of Blois where Gaston had founded a botanic garden (and an aviary) and cultivated a wealth of rare plants. The director of the gardens, Scottish botanist Robert Morison, is believed to have inspired Robert to illustrate the resident plants. Gaston of Orléans died in 1660, bequeathing his collections (cabinet of curiosities, medals, antiques, vellums) to his nephew, Louis XIV, who lodged them at the Jardin des Plantes in Paris. Colbert encouraged Louis to continue making what became the King's vellum collection. In 1664, Nicolas Robert obtained a new position, that of ‘Peintre ordinaire du Roy pour la miniature’. From then on, he used as models the plants indicated to him by the naturalists of the (created in 1626) and the birds of the Royal Menagerie of Versailles (His successors went to the Ménagerie du Jardin des Plantes when it was created in 1794). We owe him more than 700 miniatures on vellum, nearly 500 of which have plants as their subject. The vellum miniatures are held by the Museum, and the printed ones by the Bibliothèque Nationale (including a Recueil de plantes et de fleurs dessinnées (sic) à la sanguine). He also contributed to the Mémoires pour servir à l'histoire des plantes (with Abraham Bosse for the engraving). On his death, he was succeeded by Louis de Chastillon who, in addition to his artistic work, was a draughtsman for the French Academy of Sciences. He worked with a number of medical doctors and, in botany, with Guy de La Brosse, Denis Dodart and Robert. Jean-Baptiste Massé studied under him. Jacques Bailly was Robert's pupil and assistant for miniature painting and engraving.

Robert's successors as painters of the plants in the royal botanical garden were Jean Joubert (1643-1707), who was assisted by Claude Aubriet. Aubriet had previously accompanied Joseph Pitton de Tournefort (1656-1708) to the Middle East; Tournefort commissioned him to illustrate his celebrated Elemens de Botanique (Paris, 1694) (and the new enlarged edition, Institutiones rei herbariae, 1700). Aubriet also provided the illustrations for the 1727 edition of Sébastien Vaillant's Botanicon parisiense (1723).

Françoise Basseporte was a pupil of Aubriet, whom she succeeded in 1743. She taught floral miniature painting to the daughters of Louis XV. Among her pupils were Marie Marguerite Bihéron and Pierre-Joseph Redouté, who was also a pupil of Gerard van Spaendonck (1746-1822), who, born in the Netherlands and arriving in Paris in 1769, became miniaturist at the court of Louis XVI in 1774 and Basseporte's successor in 1780. He enriched the King's vellum collection with more than fifty works. In 1793, he was appointed to the chair of natural iconography at the newly created Muséum national d'histoire naturelle: it was to train miniaturist painters, now specialised in botany or zoology and recruited by competition; their works now had an explicitly scientific purpose. He was also responsible for the 'Fleurs Dessinees d'apres Nature' (1801), 24 plates engraved by Charles Ruotte for student painters. He also illustrated the 'Annales du Muséum National d'Histoire Naturelle' (20 volumes, from 1802 to 1813) and painted flower still lifes. He, of course, had many students: Pierre Antoine Poiteau, Jean Henri Jaume Saint-Hilaire, Antoine Chazal, Henriëtte Geertruida Knip, Jan Frans van Dael, Piat Joseph Sauvage, Charlotte Eustace Sophie de Fuligny-Damas, and especially Pancrace Bessa and the Redouté brothers.

Pierre-Joseph Redouté, nicknamed 'the Raphael of flowers', was Marie-Antoinette's painter, worked at the Muséum, went to Kew Gardens, returned to draw for the Academy of Sciences, became Joséphine de Beauharnais's painter, then gave drawing lessons at the Muséum. We are indebted to him for a large number of first-class works. Of particular note is a catalogue of flowers, Description des plantes nouvelles et peu connues, cultivées dans le jardin de J. M. Cels. Avec figures, showing exotic plants cultivated by the gardener Cels. The author is the botanist Étienne Pierre Ventenat. One of P-J Redouté's students was Henriette Vincent. In the preface to Les Roses, Redouté briefly reviews the history of botanical illustration since antiquity. He then concentrates on the history of the depiction of roses.

Henri-Joseph Redouté (1766-1852) was a painter at the Muséum, then took part in the Commission des Sciences et des Arts during the "Expedition to Egypt", in the company of botanists such as Ernest Coquebert de Monbret, Hippolyte Nectoux and Raffeneau-Delile - the latter being responsible for the botanical plates in the Description de l'Égypte, illustrated with engravings taken from Redouté's watercolours on Bristol paper.

[Pancrace Bessa (1772-1846) succeeded Henri Redouté as painter at the Natural History Museum in 1823. Ange-Louis-Guillaume Le Sourd de Beauregard (Paris, 17 April 1800 – 1886), a pupil of van Spaendonck and a painter of flowers, also became a professor of iconography in 1841. We can also mention Adèle Riché; Jean Saturnin Abeille de Fontaine (born in Paris in 1721, the son of Joseph Abeille); Édouard Maubert (1806-1879), who specialised in botanical and horticultural illustrations; Alfred Riocreux (1820-1912), a painter at the Manufacture Royale de Porcelaine at Sèvres, he drew for Gustave Thuret, algologist, whom he accompanied to Cherbourg (around 1844-45). He bequeathed many vellums to the Muséum from 1849 to 1857.

Charles-Émile Cuisin was a pupil of Horace Lecoq de Boisbaudran: Atlas de la flore des environs de Paris by Ernest Cosson and Germain de Saint-Pierre, illustrations by Germain de Saint-Pierre, Riocreux and Cuisin; two African floras (one by Georges Révoil, the other by Émile Auguste Joseph De Wildeman and Théophile Alexis Durand).

The vellum collection slowed down towards the middle of the 19th century and then stopped, only to resume a century later (Marie-Pierre Le Sellin is the latest contributor).

See the digitised vellums on the Muséum's site: . In the column on the left, look for "Collection d'images" and click on "Collection des vélins du Muséum national d'histoire naturelle (54)"

In 2016 the firm of Citadelles & Mazenod published a 624-page volume depicting 800 of the plates from the collection.
