= Madame Vincent =

Madame Vincent may refer to:

- Adélaïde Labille-Guiard (1749–1803), French painter
- Henriette Vincent (1786–1834), French botanical painter
