= Christiaan van Pol =

Dutch painter

- Born: 14 March 1752; Heemstede, Dutch Republic
- Died: 21 May 1813 (aged 61); Paris, France

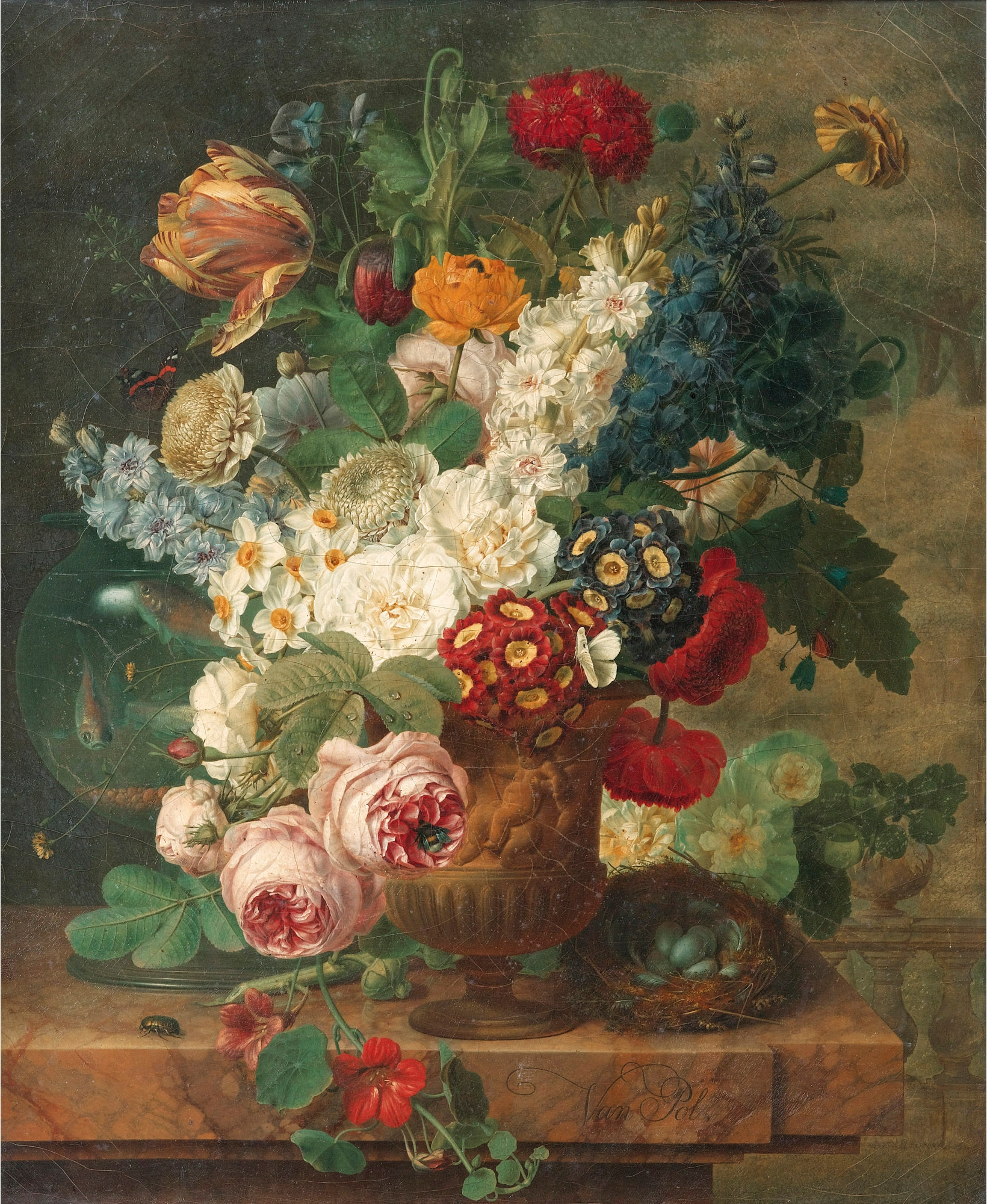
Still-life with Vase of Flowers

Christiaan van Pol (14 March 1752 – 21 May 1813) was a flower painter from the Netherlands.

Pol was born in Berkenrode, a small town of about ten Catholic families that is now part of Heemstede. He probably learned to draw in the tavern there known as the Dorstige Kuil, where the artists Simon Fokke, John Greenwood, Jan Punt and others from the Amsterdamse Tekenacademie would meet during the summer months. He first trained in Antwerp where he learned "sieraad schilderen", or decorative painting. Here he met Gerrit Malleyn and Cornelis van Spaendonck and through him, Gerard van Spaendonck and Jan Frans van Dael. He then travelled with them to Paris in 1782 where he at first spent time making decorative arabesques and painting flower arrangements in miniature on snuffbox lids. He became a good friend of Van Dael, who he stayed close to the rest of his life. Like Van Dael, he created oil paintings in the manner of Jan van Huysum, of which his best piece was shown in 1809 and another in 1814. He also made designs for the Gobelins Manufactory and his considered a pupil of Van Dael because of similarities to his work, though he was much older than him.

The historians Roeland van Eynden and Adriaan van der Willigen devoted six pages in their dictionary of artists to Pol. He spent the last years of his life teaching.

Pol died in Paris and Pierre-Louis Dagoty bought his largest flower piece.
