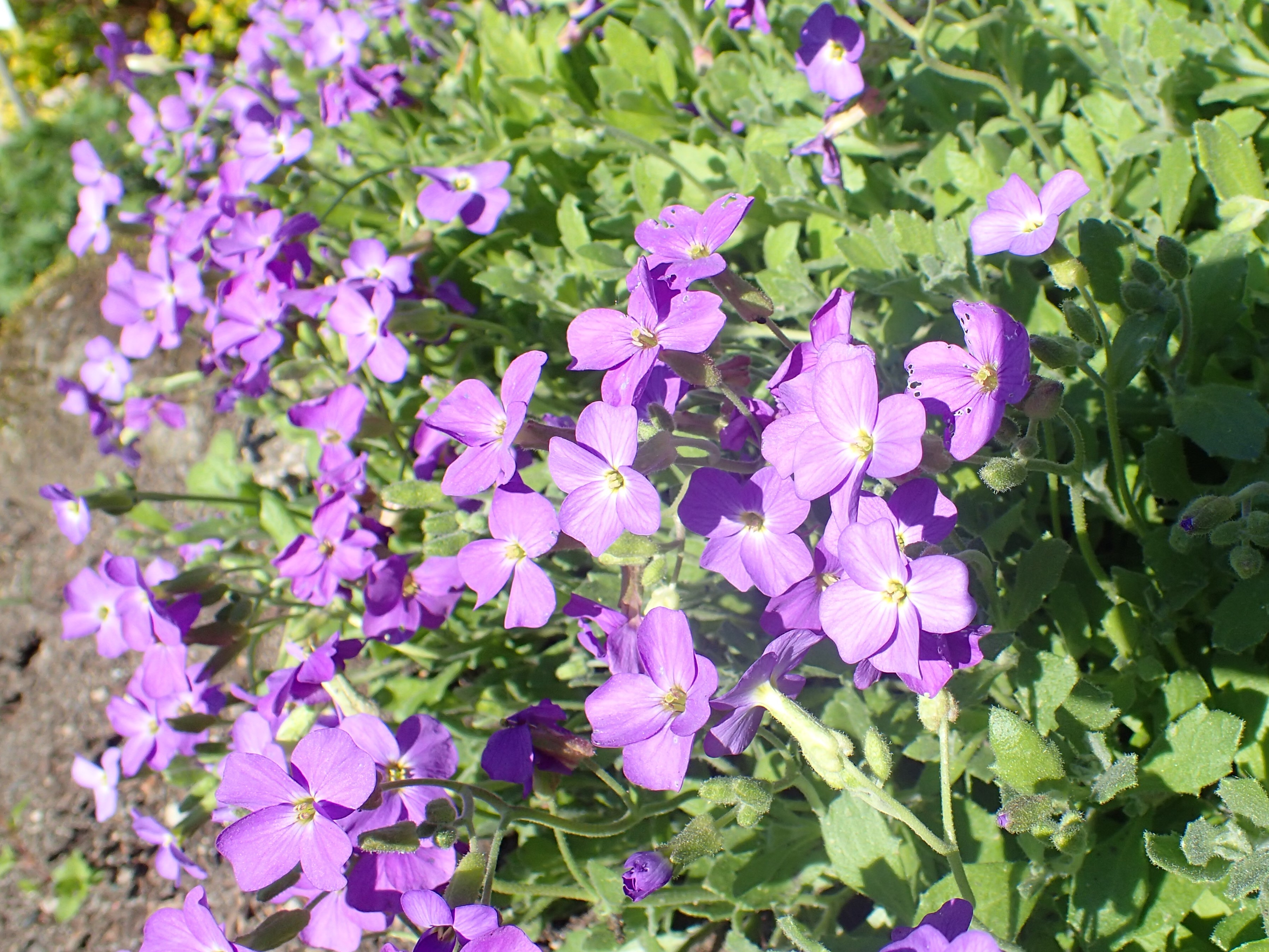

Scientific classification
- Kingdom: Plantae
- Clade: Embryophytes
- Clade: Tracheophytes
- Clade: Angiosperms
- Clade: Eudicots
- Clade: Rosids
- Order: Brassicales
- Family: Brassicaceae
- Genus: Aubrieta
- Species: A. libanotica

Binomial name
- Aubrieta libanotica Boiss. & Hohen., 1849

= Aubrieta libanotica =

Species of flowering plant

Aubrieta libanotica, common name Lebanese rock cress, is a species of flowering plant in the mustard family Brassicaceae. The genus is named after Claude Aubriet, a French flower painter. A. libanotica is native to the mountainous ranges of Lebanon and some parts of Syria.

== Description ==
It is a low, spreading plant, hardy, evergreen and perennial, with small violet, flowers, and inhabits rocks and banks. It prefers light, well-drained soil, is tolerant of a wide pH range, and can grow in partial shade or full sun.

== Etymology ==
The genus is named after Claude Aubriet, a French flower painter. The specific epithet refers the Lebanon mountain range where the species was first described by the Swiss botanist Pierre Edmond Boissier.

== Distribution and habitat ==
A. libanotica is endemic to elevated mountains of Lebanon.

== Diseases and pests ==
A. libanotica is susceptible to Ceutorhynchus minutus a true weevil in the tribe Ceutorhynchini.
