= French Industrial Exposition of 1844 =

French national industrial exposition

Exposition des produits de l'industrie française
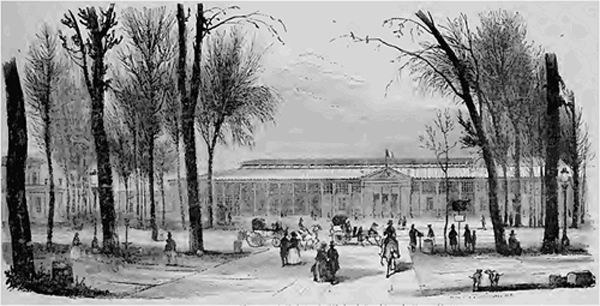
- 1844 Paris Industry Exposition building on the Champes-Élysées

Overview
- BIE-class: Unrecognized exposition
- Name: Exposition des produits de l'industrie française

Location
- Country: France
- City: Paris
- Venue: Champs-Élysées

Timeline
- Opening: 1 May 1844
- Closure: 29 June 1844

Specialized expositions

The French Industrial Exposition of 1844 (French: Exposition des produits de l'industrie française en 1844), held in a temporary structure on the Champs-Élysées in Paris, was the tenth in a series of eleven French national industrial expositions held since 1798 to encourage improvements in progressive agriculture and in technology.

== History ==
The exposition lasted 60 days, with 3,960 exhibitors. It opened in the Champs-Élysées on 1 May and closed on 29 June. In the 1844 exposition it was found necessary to exclude retailers who did not make their own products, and to eliminate anything that was not socially useful, which included both freak artisan products and instruments used only by scientists. Entrants had to fill out a form that gave information about their business including its nature, number of employees, materials used, export and domestic earning and so on. The king of France, Louis Philippe I, opened the exposition and toured all the exhibits. Hector Berlioz composed and conducted the Hymne à la France, a great symphonic and choral work performed during the opening. Several vaudeville skits were performed during the exposition.

The king came back every Monday to examine some exhibits in more detail. There were 3,969 exhibitors, with most exhibits held in forty galleries in the grand hall. Exhibits were placed in the categories: Fabrics, Metals and other Minerals, Machinery, Precision Instruments, Chemical Arts, Fine Arts, Pottery, and Diverse Arts. The jury finished judging the exhibits on 25 July 1844. Louis Philippe presided over an award ceremony on 29 July 1844 in the Tuileries. He personally presented 31 Legion of Honour medals to the most distinguished exhibitors. In all there were 3,253 awards.

=== Legion of Honour awards ===
Legion of Honour awards were:

Notable and unusual

- Gold medal: Louis-Georges Mulot in the category 'Machines'
- Adolphe Sax presented an example of the saxhorn.
- Charles Xavier Thomas of Colmar presented the arithmometer.
- Jean-Baptiste Sabatier-Blot presented his daguerreotypes, and received an honourable mention.

Others

- Andreé, founder, in the Val d'Osne foundry, Osne-le-Val, Haute-Marne
- Frédéric Bacot, manufacturer of sheets, in Sedan, Ardennes
- Claude-Joseph Bonnet, silk manufacturer, in Lyon, Rhône
- Bontemps, manufacturer of glassware, in Choisy-le-Roi, Seine
- Bourdon, director of the forges and foundries of Le Creusot, Saône-et-Loire
- J. J. Bourkardt, manufacturer of machines, in Guebwiller, Haut-Rhin
- Buron, manufacturer of optical instruments, in Paris
- Jean-François Cail, manufacturer of machines, in Paris
- Camu fils, wool spinner, in Reims, Marne
- Charrière, manufacturer of surgical instruments, in Paris
- Théodore Chennvière, manufacturer of sheets, in Elbeuf, Seine-Inférieure
- François Debuchy, manufacturer of linen, wool and cotton fabrics, in Lille, Nord
- Fauler ainé, maker of Morocco leather products, in Choisy-le-Roi, Seine
- Etienne Faure, manufacturer of ribbons, in Saint-Étienne, Loire
- Victor Frerejean, master of ironworks, in Vienne, Isère
- Girard, tissue printer, in Rouen, Seine-Inférieure
- Godard fils, manufacturer of crystals, in Baccarat, Meurthe
- Grillet ainé, manufacturer of shawls, in Lyon, Rhône
- Jacques Gros, manufacturer of cotton fabrics, in Wesserling, Haut-Rhin
- Jean-Justin Lacroix, paper maker, in Angoulême, Charente
- Théodore Lefebvre, manufacturer of white lead, at Moulins-lès-Lille, Lille, Nord
- Lemire, manufacturer of chemical products, in Choisy-le-Roi, Seine
- Massenet, manufacturer of steel and iron, in Saint-Étienne, Loire
- Milliet, manufacturer of porcelain, in Montereau, Seine-et-Marne
- Ogereau, tanner, in Paris
- Pecqueur, manufacturer of machines, in Paris
- Roller, piano player, in Paris
- Augustin Roswag, manufacturer of metallic fabrics, at Sélestat, Bas-Rhin
- Charles Henri Schattenmann, director of the mining company of Bouxwiller, Bas-Rhin
- Antoine Thénard, chief engineer of bridges and highways, in Abzac, Gironde
- Joseph-Thaddeus Winnerl, manufacturer of timepieces, in Paris

== Influence ==
Though it was the tenth Paris exposition, it began to spawn imitators elsewhere in the world, including the 1851 Great Exhibition in London, which was open to international exhibitors from the entire world and outshone the highly successful French exhibition. Other European expositions soon followed: Bern and Madrid in 1845; Brussels with an elaborate industrial exposition in 1847; Bordeaux in 1847; Saint Petersburg in 1848; and Lisbon in 1849. The exposition returned to Paris in 1849, called the Exposition of the Second Republic or Exposition Nationale des produits de l’industrie agricole et manufacturière, with 5,494 exhibitors and was replaced in 1855 by an international exhibition.

== Sources ==
- Chandler, Arthur, Expositions of the July Monarchy
- Colmont, Achille de (1855), Histoire des Expositions des produits de l'Industrie Française (in French), Guillaumin
- Douyere-Demeulenaere, Christiane (2005), "Expositions publiques des produits de l'industrie française avant 1850" (PDF), archivesnationales.culture.gouv.fr (in French)
- Exposition des produits de l'industrie française en 1844. Rapport du jury central (in French), vol. 2, Le Conservatoire numérique des Arts & Métiers
- Jury central (1844), Rapport du Jury central ... (in French), Imprimerie de Fain et Thunot
