= Jacques Philippe Martin Cels =

French horticulturalist (1740–1806)

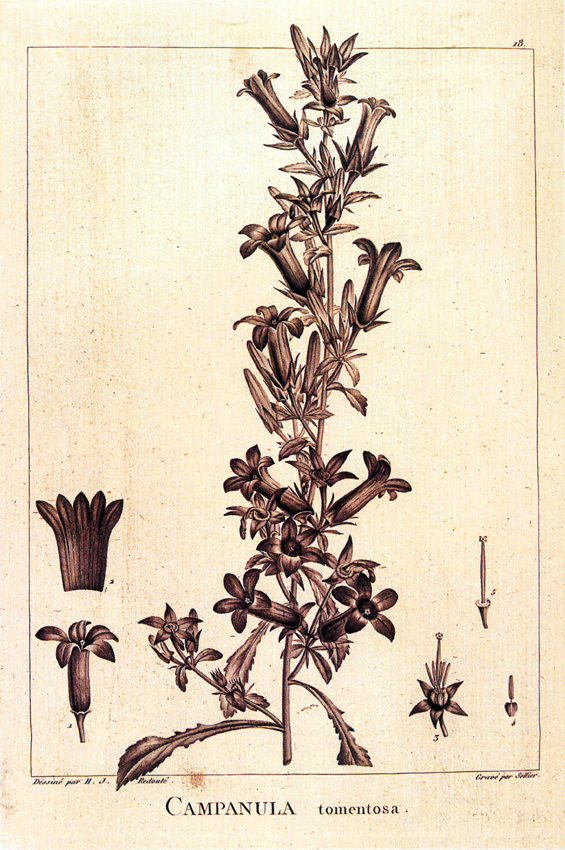
"Campanula tomentosa", from E.-P. Ventenat's Description des plantes nouvelles et peu connues, cultivées dans le jardin de J.-M. Cels

Jacques Philippe Martin Cels (June 15, 1740 – May 15, 1806) was a French botanist specializing in horticulture.

Cels was born in Versailles. He was a duty collector at the gates of Paris. Ruined when the French Revolution abolished his position, he started a botanical garden in which he cultivated foreign plants for sale, contributing to the growing public appetite for exotic flowers. He received and acclimatized numerous North American plants brought back by André Michaux and Louis-Augustin Bosc d'Antic. He strove to introduce many exotic species into France. He was made a member of the rural husbandry division of the French Academy of Sciences in 1795 and a member of the Académie d'Agriculture. He published instructional material in the various branches of his science. The species in his garden were described by the botanist Étienne Pierre Ventenat (1757–1808) and illustrated by Pierre-Joseph Redouté (1759–1840) in Description des plantes nouvelles et peu connues, cultivées dans le jardin de J.-M. Cels, published in Paris in 1799. A second illustrated work with illustrations by a "student of Redouté", Pancrace Bessa, appeared in 1803, Choix de plantes :dont la plupart sont cultivées dans le jardin de Cels, accessible at version numérique sur Botanicus.

Cels died in Montrouge in 1806.

== Notes ==
- This article is based on a translation of an article from the French Wikipedia.
