= Jean Castilhon =

French journalist and writer (1720–1799)

- Born: 11 September 1720; Toulouse
- Died: 6 January 1799 (aged 78); Toulouse
- Occupations: Journalist; Writer

Jean Castilhon (11 September 1720 – 6 January 1799) was an 18th-century French journalist and writer.

Castilhon was one of the editors of the Nécrologe des hommes célèbres de France, from 1761 to 1782, at the Journal encyclopédique, from 1769 to 1793, the Journal de Trévoux, from 1774 to 1778, the Journal de jurisprudence of his brother Jean-Louis Castilhon, also a writer, and creator of the Spectateur français, ou Journal des mœurs in 1776.

Jean Castilhon was elected guardian of the Académie des Jeux floraux in 1751. A member of the Académie des sciences, inscriptions et belles-lettres de Toulouse, he became its permanent secretary in 1784. In 1798, he established a literary society, "Le Lycée de Toulouse", of which he was first president.

== Publications ==
- 1754: Amusements philosophiques et littéraires de deux amis, with Lancelot Turpin de Crissé. Read online
- 1769: Histoire de Robert le Diable, duc de Normandie, et de Richard sans Peur, son fils
- 1770: Histoire de Fortunatus et de ses enfans
- 1774: Anecdotes chinoises, japonoises, siamoises, tonquinoises, etc., dans lesquelles on s’est attaché principalement aux mœurs, usages, coutumes et religions de ces différents peuples de l’Asie
- 1775: Histoire de Pierre de Provence et de la Belle Maguelonne
- 1776: Le Spectateur français, ou Journal des mœurs
- 1776: Histoire de Jean de Calais, sur de nouveaux mémoires
- 1781: Précis historique de la vie de Marie-Thérèse, archiduchesse d’Autriche, impératrice douairière, reine de Hongrie et de Bohême
- 1783: Les Quatre Fils d’Aymon. Histoire héroïque
- 1783: Histoire de Richard sans Peur, duc de Normandie, fils de Robert le Diable. Pour servir de suite à celle de son père

== Sources ==
- Ferdinand Hoefer, Nouvelle Biographie générale, t. 9, Paris, Firmin-Didot, 1854, (p. 117).
- Axel Duboul, Les Deux Siècles de l’Académie des Jeux floraux, vol. 2, Édouard Privat, Toulouse, 1901, (p. 226–229).
