= Édouard Maubert =

French painter and natural history illustrator

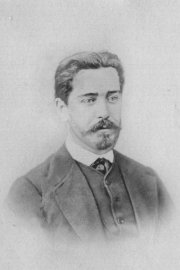
Édouard Maubert

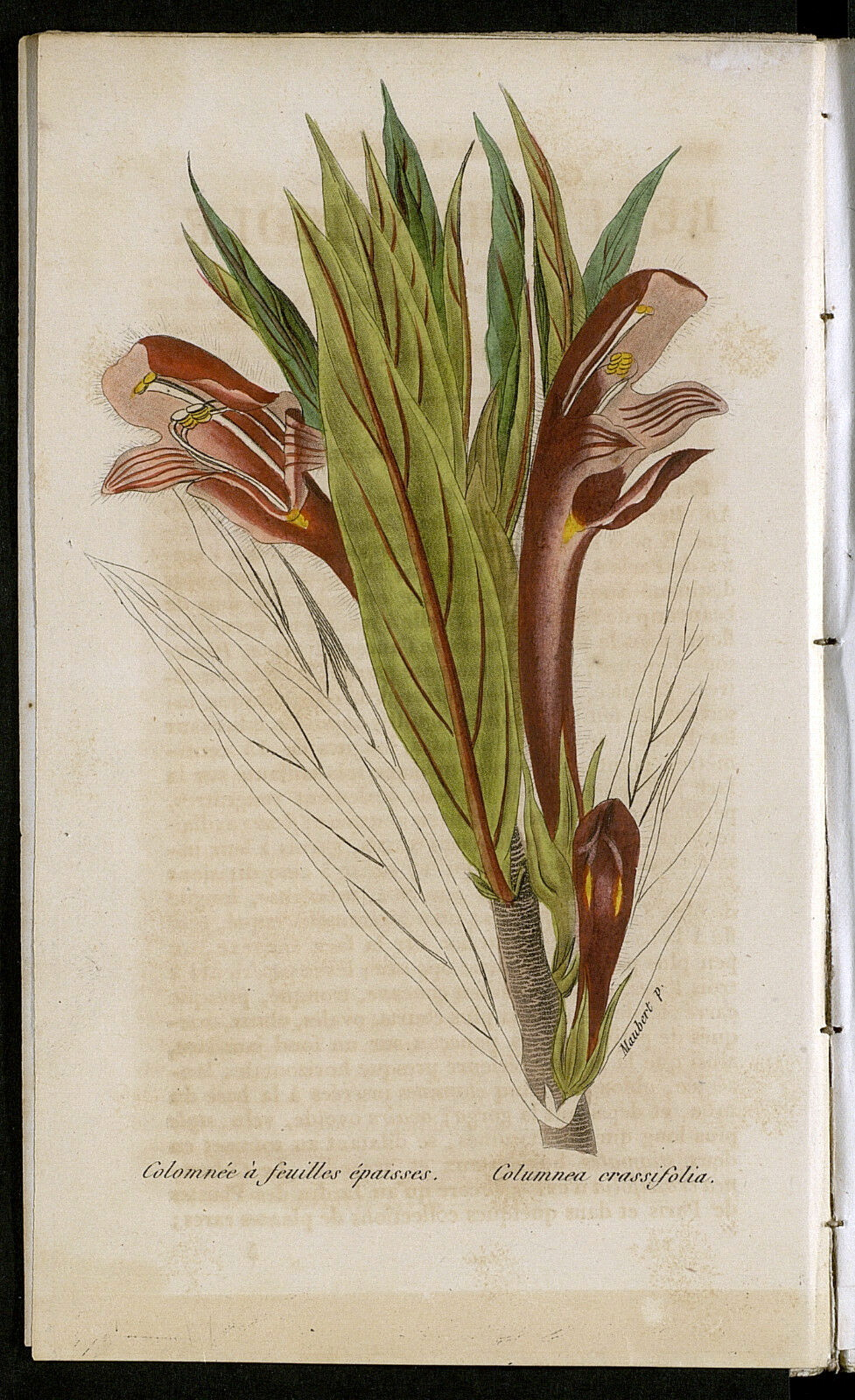
Columnea crassifolia

Louis Joseph Édouard Maubert (30 January 1806 Calais – 30 April 1879 Paris) was a prolific French natural history illustrator, who contributed to botanical books and horticultural journals, working with botanists such as Jean-Louis-Auguste Loiseleur-Deslongchamps, Charles Antoine Lemaire, Charles Henry Dessalines d'Orbigny, Hippolyte François Jaubert and Jean Jules Linden.

Maubert trained under the watercolor painter Louis Francia, and settled in Paris around 1836. He improved his skills with Pierre Joseph Redouté at the Museum of Natural History. His training and talent gained him access to scientific circles within the Museum of Natural History. He painted flowers until the day before his death in his Parisian apartment at 15 rue de Buffon in the 5th arrondissement.

Maubert also lived on the rue du Marche aux Chevaux, near the Jardin des plantes.

== Selected works ==
- Flore médicale usuelle et industrielle du XIXe siècle 3 vols.
- Les Fleurs animées de Granville (1867)
