= Jan Frans van Dael =

Flemish painter

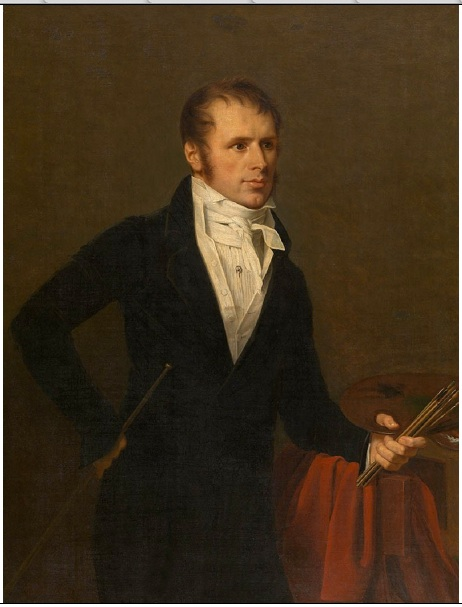
- Portrait of Jan Frans van Dael by Robert Lefèvre (1804)
- Born: 27 May 1764; Antwerp
- Died: 20 March 1840; Paris
- Resting place: Père Lachaise Cemetery
- Occupation: Painter

Signature
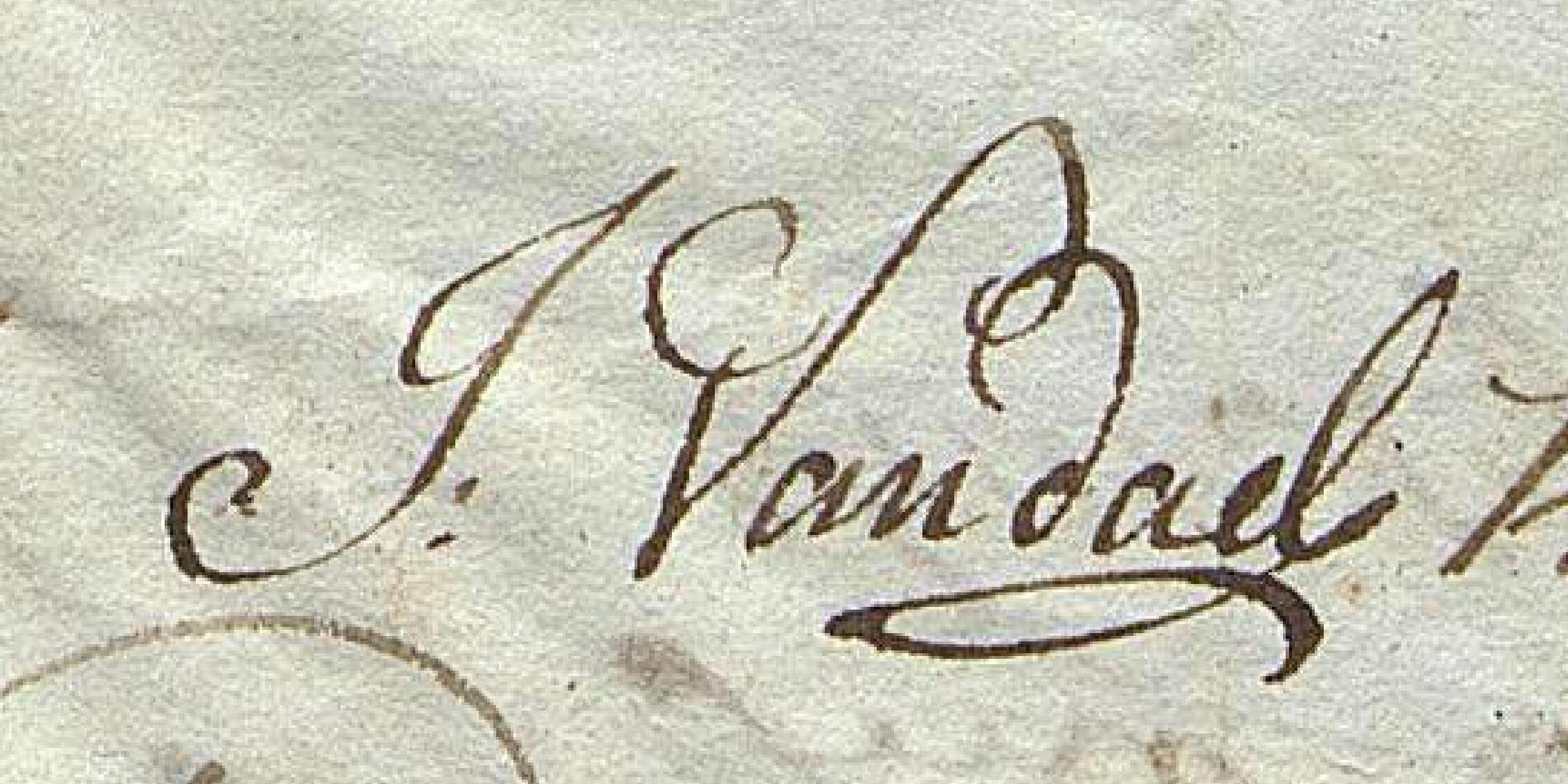

Jan Frans van Dael or Jean-François van Dael (27 May 1764 – 20 March 1840) was a Flemish painter and lithographer specialising in still lifes of flowers and fruit. He had a successful career in Paris where his patrons included the Empresses of France as well as the kings of Restoration France. His work stands in the Flemish and Dutch tradition of flower painting with a sober composition and attention to detail to which he added a French-inspired decorative monumentality.

== Life ==
Jan Frans van Dael was born in Antwerp as the son of a joiner. He studied architectural drawing at the Antwerp Fine Arts Academy. He won the academy's first prizes for architecture in 1784 and 1785.

He travelled to Paris in 1786 where he resided in the artists' accommodations at the Louvre, near artists Piat Joseph Sauvage, Gerard van Spaendonck en Pierre-Joseph Redouté. From 1806 until 1813 he worked as a state-protected artist in a studio in the Sorbonne.

He was originally active as a decorator and worked on projects at the Château of Saint-Cloud, Bellevue and Chantilly. He was self-taught in painting, but under the influence of van Spaendonck he turned to flower painting.

He regularly submitted work to the Paris Salon between 1793 and 1833 as well as to Salons in the Low Countries. Evidence of his success are the many commissions he secured from the Empresses Joséphine Bonaparte (who owned five of his works) and Marie Louise Bonaparte as well as the Restoration Kings Louis XVIII and Charles X. Van Dael was a member of his alma mater, the Academy of Antwerp, as well as at the Academy of Architecture in Amsterdam.

He collected the works of flower artists, both by his contemporaries and by the great 17th-century Dutch still life painters Jan Davidsz. de Heem, Abraham Mignon, Rachel Ruysch, and Jan van Huysum.

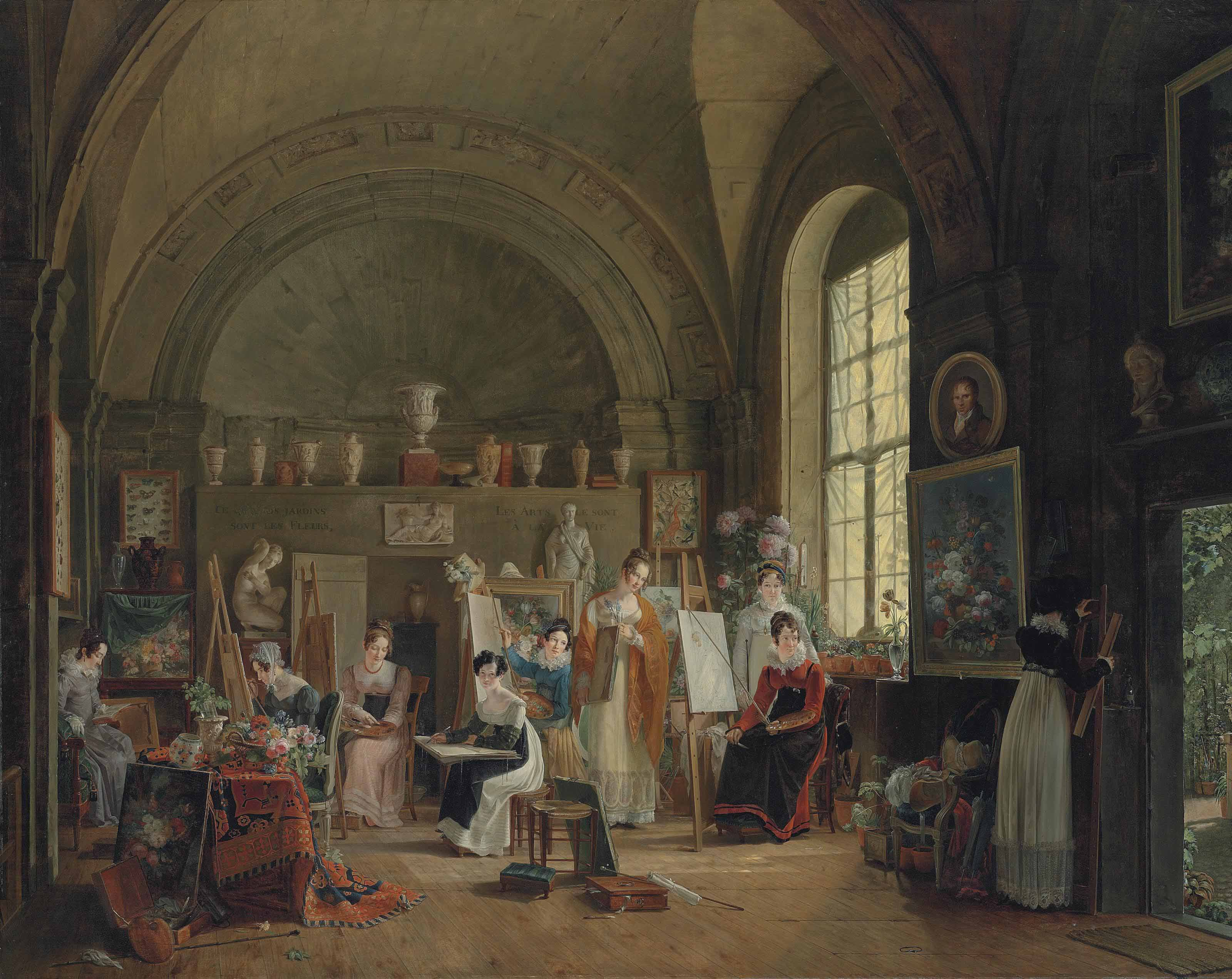
Philippe-Jacques van Bree, Interior of the Studio of Van Dael and his students at the Sorbonne, 1816

His pupils were Jean Benner-Fries, Elise Bruyère, Laurent Coste, Vicomtesse Iphigénie Decaux-Milet-Moreau, Henriëtte Geertruida Knip, Elisa-Emilie Le Mire, Auguste Piquet de Brienne, Christiaan van Pol, Adèle Riché, and Jean Ulrich Tournier.

He spent his whole active career in France. He died in Paris in 1840 and was buried in the Père Lachaise Cemetery by the side of his friend and fellow artist, van Spaendonck.

== Work ==
Van Dael mainly painted stilllifes of flowers and fruit, with some of these compositions including a background landscape. Van Dael also painted a landscape composition. Van Dael signed as 'Vandael' and monogrammed as: I V D, V D and VD connected.

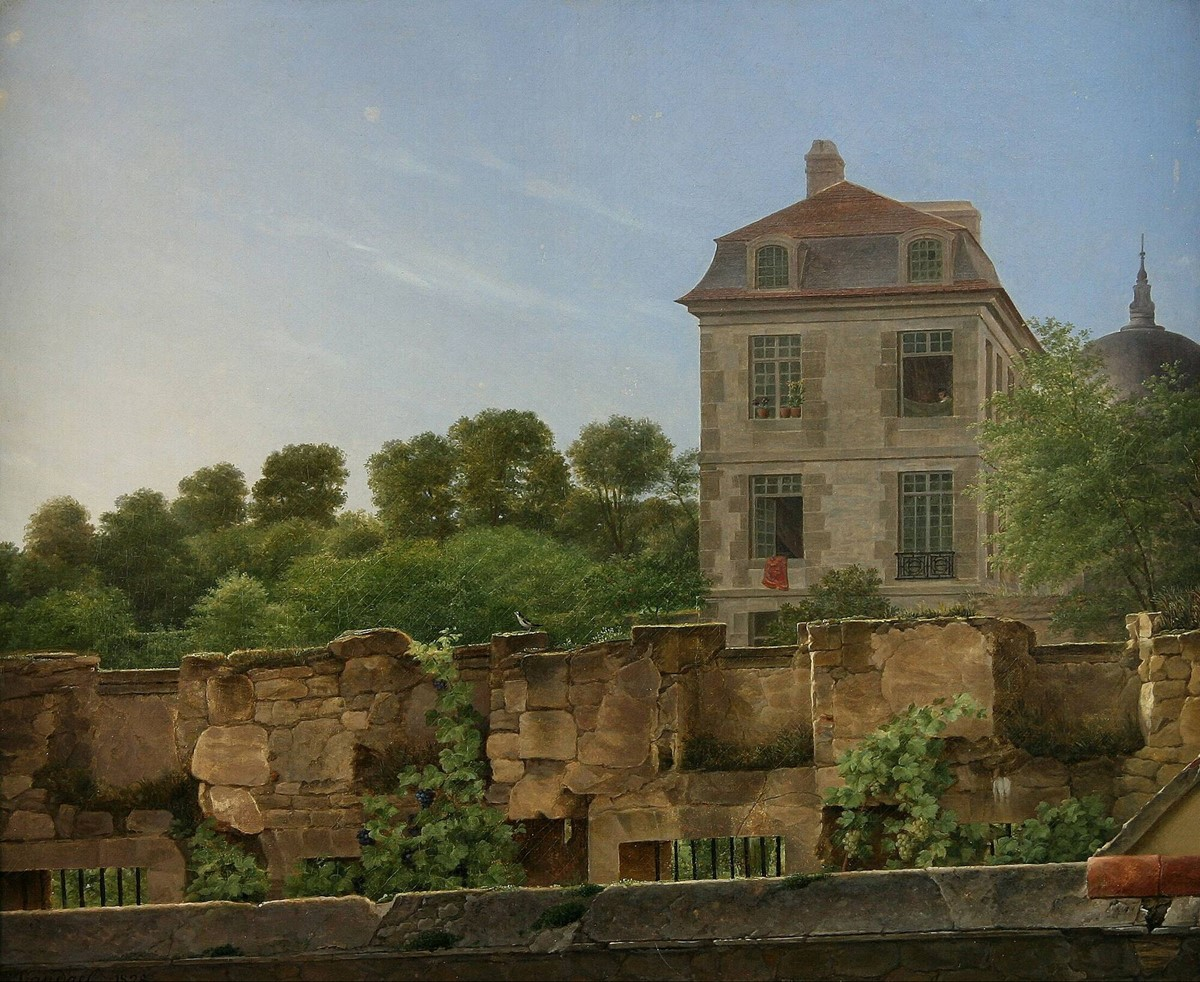
The House of the Artist

Van Dael's work stands in the Flemish and Dutch tradition of flower painting exemplified by Roelandt Savery with its sober composition and attention to detail. He also brought to many of his flower arrangements a French-inspired decorative monumentality.

Van Dael composed his flower-pieces with a variety of species, which he is believed to have studied from life. Van Dael's flowers were based on botanical study, and according to a contemporary botanist, van Hulthem, he grew flowers in his garden to serve as models. Van Dael applied a smooth gesso layer to his canvases, which allowed him to recreate the jewel-like quality of 17th-century panels. He departed from 17th-century still lifes in his use of a lighter palette of pinks, blues and yellows.

In 1828, Van Dael painted a view of his house (Museum Boijmans Van Beuningen, Rotterdam), which is a small masterpiece. He further painted a few religious and allegorical compositions. One of his best known allegorical paintings is his exhibition piece for the Salon of 1804, Julie’s Tomb (Château de Malmaison). It depicts a flower and fruit arrangement before a tomb and can be read as an allegory of life and death.

A number of his still life works were used to decorate small objects, such as boxes; the Fitzwilliam Museum possesses a collection of these boxes. Van Dael also made a few pure landscapes, and occasionally painted portraits, often of fellow artists, as well as making a few lithographs.

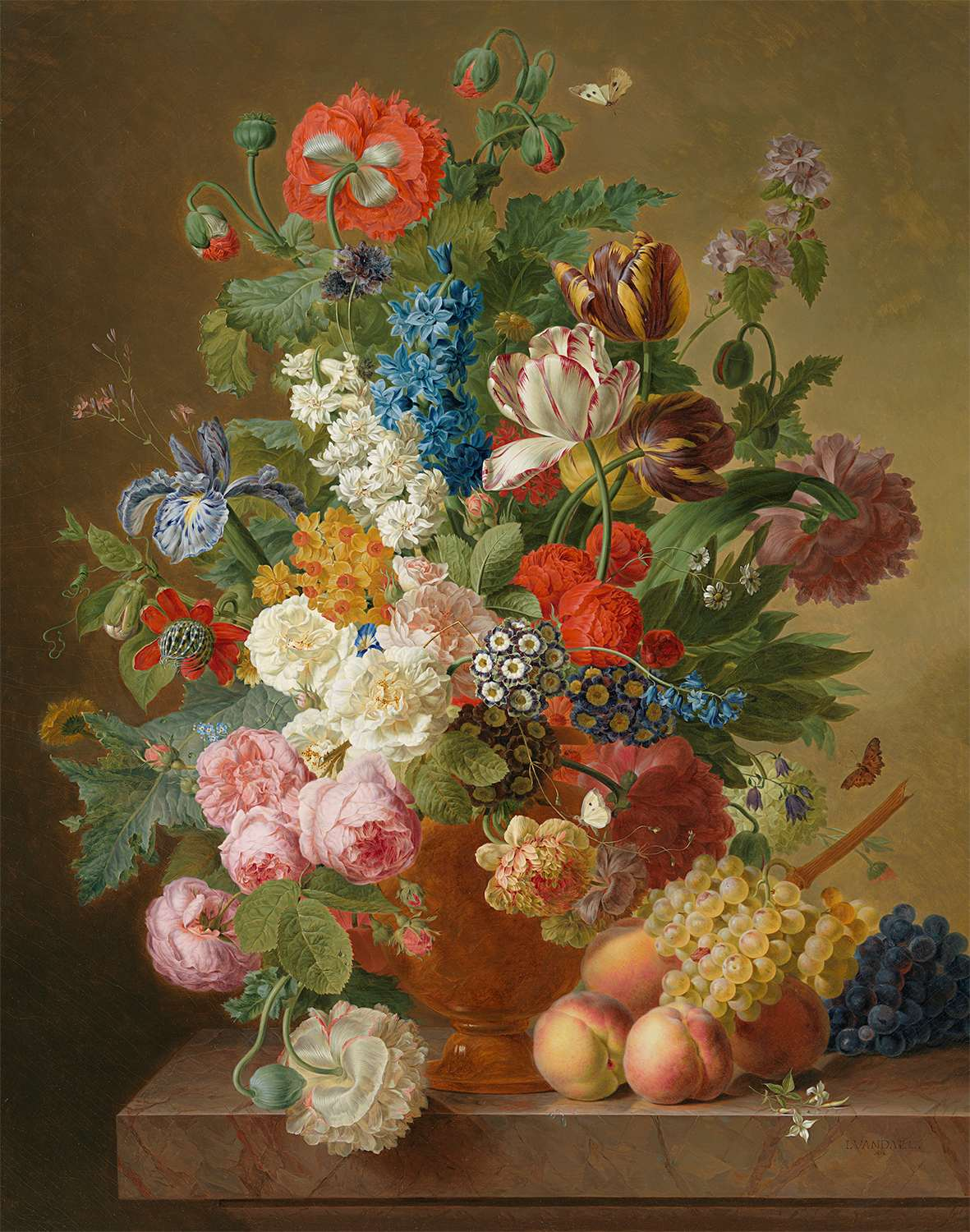
Still life of flowers

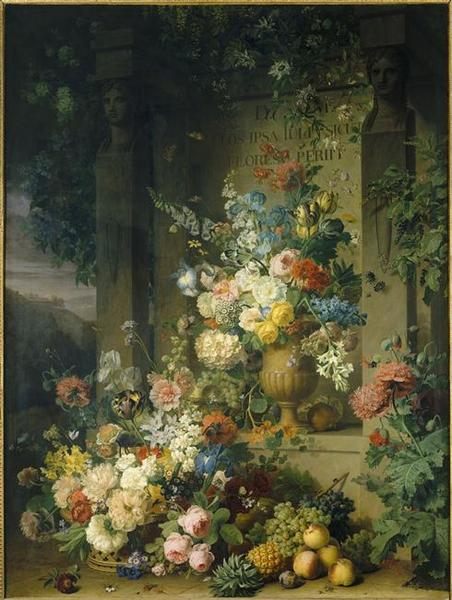
Julie's tomb
