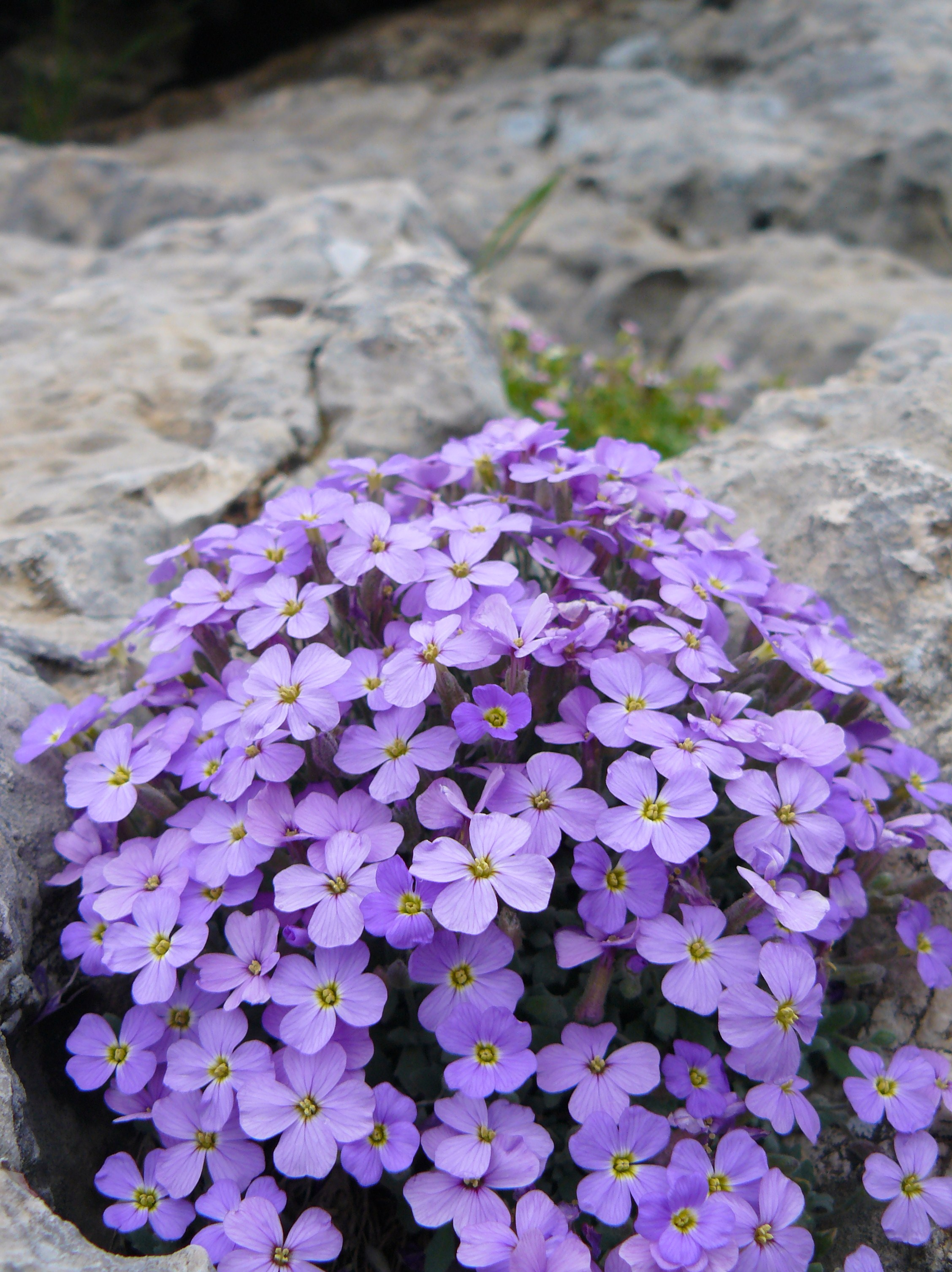
- Aubrieta deltoidea

Scientific classification
- Kingdom: Plantae
- Clade: Tracheophytes
- Clade: Angiosperms
- Clade: Eudicots
- Clade: Rosids
- Order: Brassicales
- Family: Brassicaceae
- Genus: Aubrieta; Adans. (1763)

Species
- See text

= Aubrieta =

Genus of flowering plants in the cabbage family

Aubrieta (often misspelled as Aubretia) is a genus of flowering plants in the cabbage family Brassicaceae. The genus is named after Claude Aubriet, a French flower painter. It includes over 20 species native to southeastern Europe and Western Asia. Some species have escaped from gardens throughout Europe. It is a low, spreading plant, hardy, evergreen and perennial. It has small violet, pink, or white flowers, and it inhabits rocks and banks. It prefers light, well-drained soil, is tolerant of a wide pH range, and can grow in partial shade or full sun.

== Species ==
23 species are accepted.

- Aubrieta albanica F.K.Mey. & J.E.Mey.
- Aubrieta alshehbazii Dönmez, Uğurlu & M.A.Koch
- Aubrieta amasya Tunçkol & Al-Shehbaz
- Aubrieta anamasica Peșmen & Güner
- Aubrieta birolmutlui Dönmez, Uğurlu & Yüzb.
- Aubrieta canescens (Boiss.) Bornm.
- Aubrieta columnae Guss.
- Aubrieta deltoidea (L.) DC.
- Aubrieta edentula Boiss.
- Aubrieta ekimii Yüzb., Al-Shehbaz & M.Koch
- Aubrieta erubescens Griseb.
- Aubrieta glabrescens Turrill
- Aubrieta gracilis Spruner ex Boiss.
- Aubrieta x hybrida Hausskn.
- Aubrieta intermedia Heldr. & Orph. ex Boiss.
- Aubrieta libanotica Boiss. & Hohen.
- Aubrieta necmi-aksoyi Tunçkol, G.-Özkan & Al-Shehbaz
- Aubrieta olympica Boiss.
- Aubrieta parviflora Boiss.
- Aubrieta pinardii Boiss.
- Aubrieta scardica (Wettst.) Gustavsson
- Aubrieta scyria Halácsy
- Aubrieta thessala H.Boissieu
- Aubrieta vulcanica Hayek & Siehe

== Cultivars ==
The following cultivars, of mixed or uncertain parentage, are recipients of the Royal Horticultural Society's Award of Garden Merit:-

- 'Argenteovariegata'
- 'Aureovariegata'
- 'Doctor Mules'
- 'Red Cascade'
