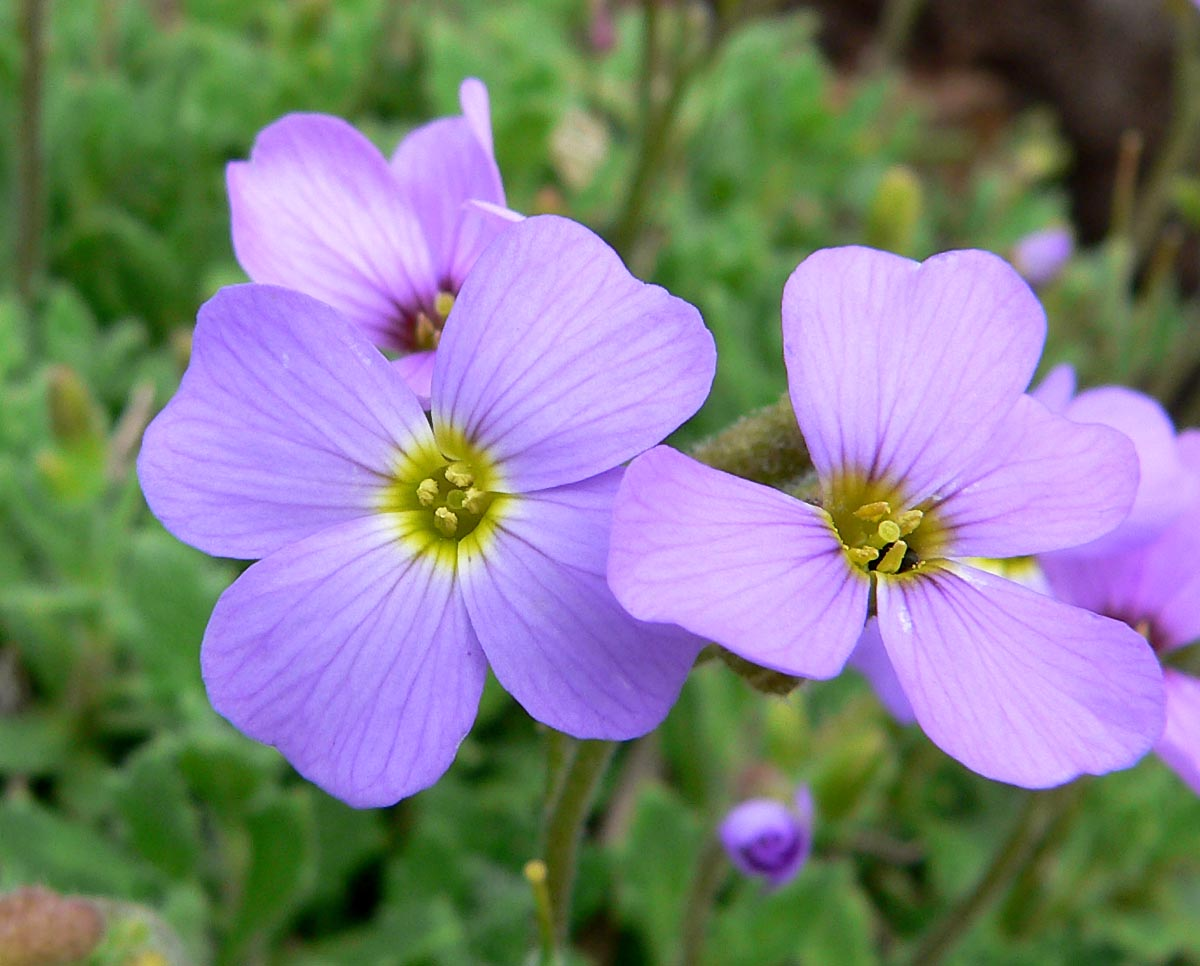

Scientific classification
- Kingdom: Plantae
- Clade: Tracheophytes
- Clade: Angiosperms
- Clade: Eudicots
- Clade: Rosids
- Order: Brassicales
- Family: Brassicaceae
- Genus: Aubrieta
- Species: A. deltoidea

Binomial name
- Aubrieta deltoidea (L.) DC.

= Aubrieta deltoidea =

Species of flowering plant

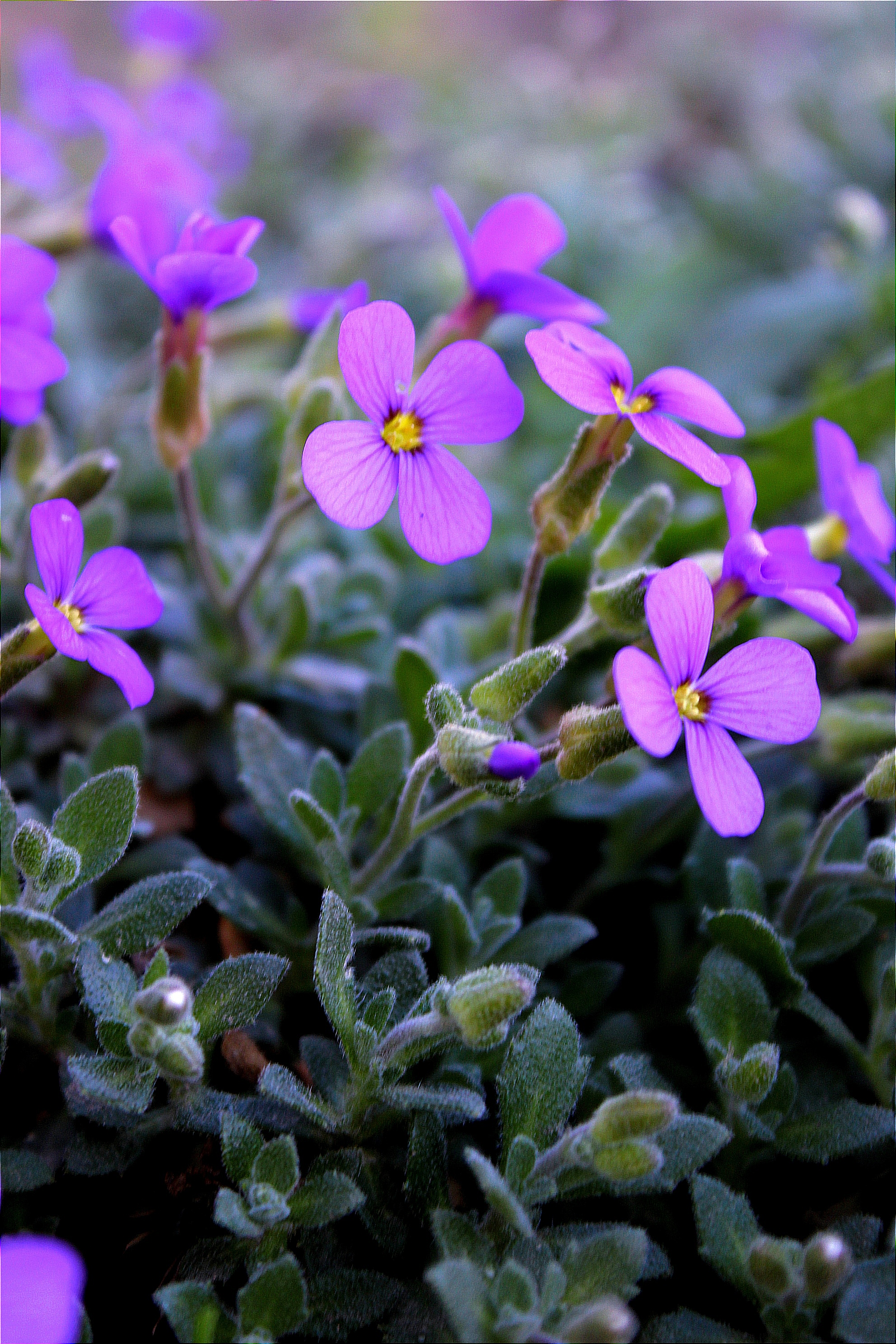
Aubrieta deltoidea

Aubrieta deltoidea is a species of flowering plant in the mustard family. Common names include lilacbush, purple rock cress and rainbow rock cress. It should be grown in zones 4a to 9b.

It is native to southeastern Europe, but is grown worldwide as an ornamental plant and it grows wild in some areas as a garden escapee. This is a small herbaceous perennial forming carpets of green spoon-shaped to oval-shaped leaves, some of which are lobed. The showy inflorescence bears small flowers with four lavender to deep pink petals. The fruit is an inflated, hairy silique up to two centimeters long.

== Cultivation ==
A. deltoidea is cultivated as groundcover, in the rock garden, or in crevices in the wall, producing masses of brightly coloured flowers in spring. Cultivated varieties, sometimes listed under the hybrid name A. × cultorum, are available in lavender, rose and lilac, but are often offered as a seed mixture. The following cultivars have gained the Royal Horticultural Society's Award of Garden Merit:-

- 'Argenteovariegata'
- 'Doctor Mules'
- 'Red Cascade'
