= Adèle Riché =

French painter

- Born: 1791; Paris, France
- Died: 1887; Fontainebleau, France

Adèle Riché (1791–1887) was a French painter. Riché was born, and lived her life in France. She is the daughter of François-Joseph Riché (1765 - 1838), chief gardener of the Paris Jardin des Plantes. A pupil of Jan Frans van Dael and Gerard van Spaendonck., she is known for her still life paintings, including watercolors, as well as her portraits. She worked most of her life as a botanical painter for the French Natural History Museum in Paris. There, she painted numerous watercolor on vellum for the Museum's collection, as well as illustrating François André Michaux's 1813 Histoire des arbres forestiers de l'Amerique Septentrionale (History of septentrional American forest trees). Her techniques included botanical, entomological, and natural painting, oil, watercolor, and on vellum, and engraving, as well as hand-colouring. She collaborated with Henri-Joseph, Pierre-Joseph Redouté, and Pancrace Bessa, also botanical artists. Apart from her scientific illustrative work, she is also a gold medalist in 1831's Salon. Riché died in Fontainebleau, France in 1878.

== Work ==
Riché worked primarily in watercolor and her subject of choice was often women, flowers, or fruit. Her portraits were often done in oil; the stylistic preference of the times. Whereas her fruit and still life pieces were done in watercolor.

She painted a portrait of Natalia Obrenovich, Queen of Serbia.

== Gallery ==
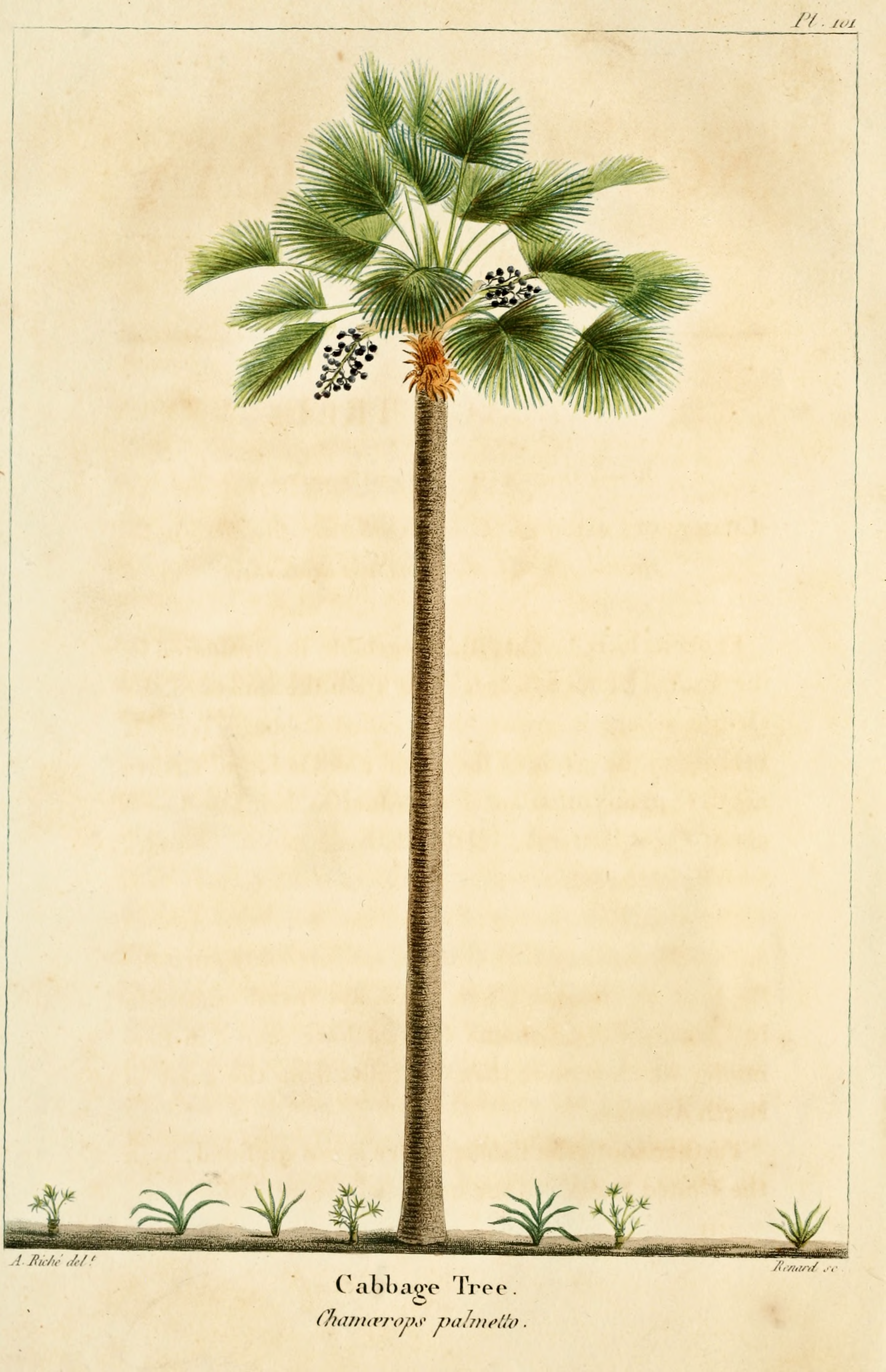
Plate 30 from The North American Sylva showing Riché's painting of the Sabal palmetto, originally known as the cabbage tree (Chamærops palmetto).

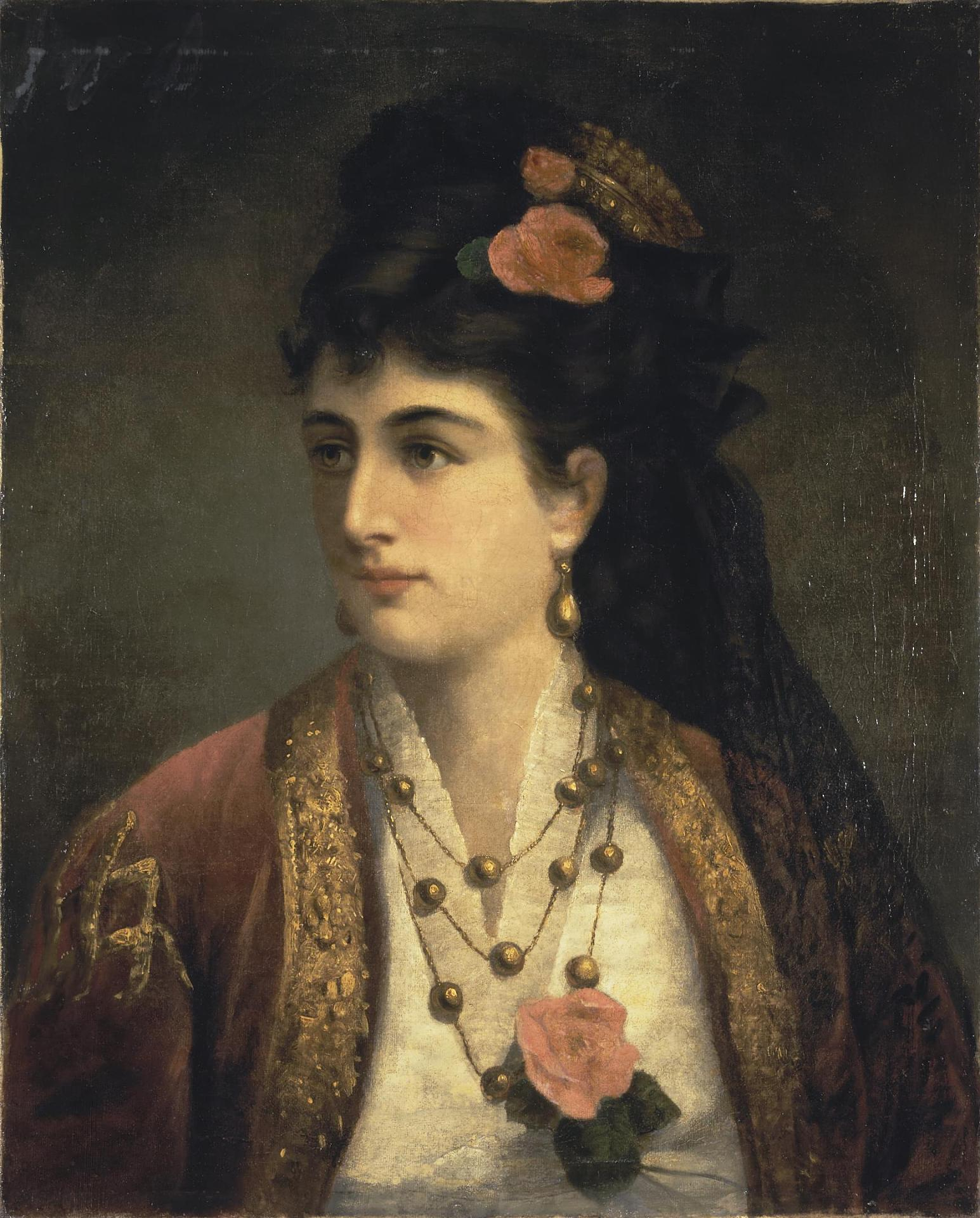
Portrait of Natalia Obrenovich, Queen of Serbia, 1875–1878
