= Andreas von Gundelsheimer =

German physician and botanist (c1668–1715)

Andreas von Gundelsheimer (ca. 1668 – 17 June 1715) was a German physician and botanist born in Feuchtwangen.

He obtained his medical doctorate in Altdorf bei Nürnberg, afterwards spending several years working in Venice. Later in Paris he made the acquaintanceship of botanist Joseph Pitton de Tournefort (1656-1708). In 1700-02 with Tournefort and painter Claude Aubriet (1665-1742), he journeyed to Asia Minor and Armenia on a research expedition. His large collection of plants gathered from the expedition were sent to herbaria in Berlin and Munich.

In 1703 he settled in Berlin, where he subsequently became a physician to Prussian royalty. He died on 17 June 1715, while accompanying King Friedrich Wilhelm I to Stettin.
