= Françoise Basseporte =

French artist (1701–1780)

Madeleine Françoise Basseporte, (French pronunciation: [fʁɑ̃swaz baspɔʁt]; 28 April 1701 – 6 September 1780) was a French painter. From 1741 until her death, she served as the Royal Painter for the King's Garden and Cabinet (now the Jardin des Plantes), an unprecedented appointment for a woman artist at the time.

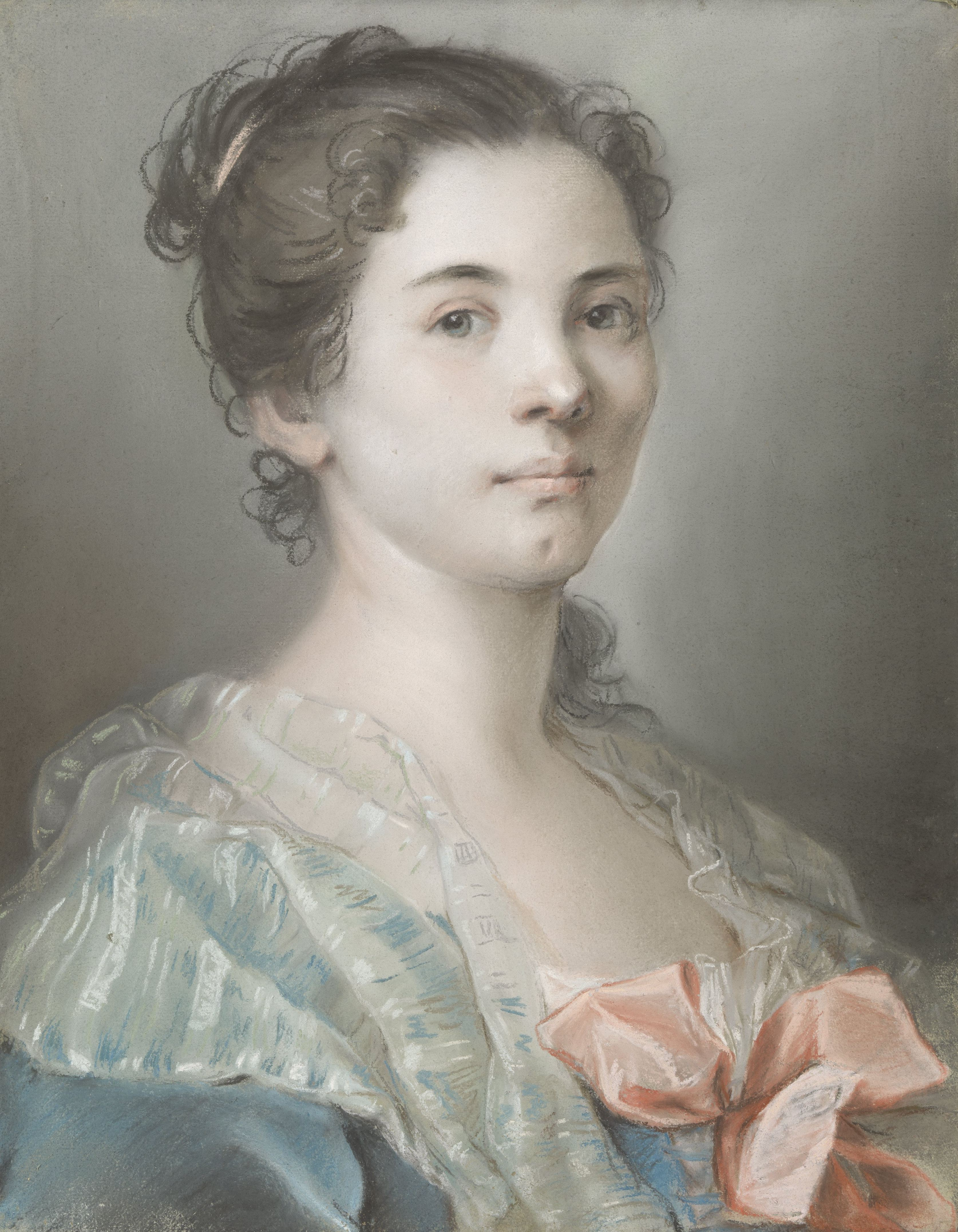
"Portrait of a young woman" (1727)

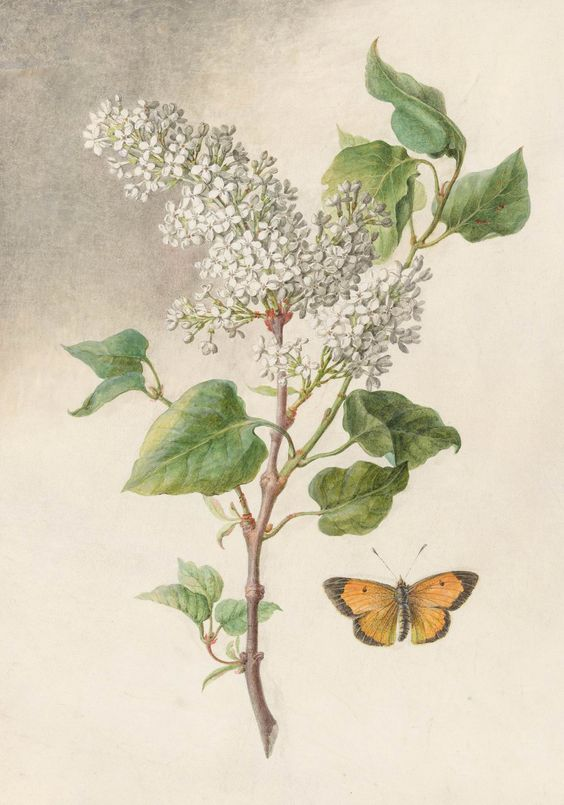
Syringa vulgaris

== Life ==
Basseporte was born and died in Paris. Originally a portrait painter specializing in pastels, she apprenticed with the botanical illustrator Claude Aubriet, requiring her to shift from pastels to watercolors and to adopt a precise, near-photographic style. In 1741, she replaced the ailing Aubriet as "Peintre du Roy, de son Cabinet et du Jardin" (King's Painter, of his cabinet and garden), making her the first female artist to occupy the office. She served for nearly 40 years in this capacity, employing not only scientific illustration skills, but also the capacity to dissect plants and reveal their internal structures. The philosopher Jean-Jacques Rousseau paid tribute to her, writing "Nature gives plants their existence, but Mademoiselle Basseporte gives them their preservation."

She collaborated with the chemist Rouelle and the sculptor Larchevêque, and studied botany with Jussieu. She later taught anatomical illustration to Marie Marguerite Bihéron, who later became a wax modeler. King Louis XV commissioned her to teach his daughters, the royal princesses, how to paint flowers. She is also believed to have been frequently consulted as an interior decorator by the royal mistress Madame de Pompadour.

=== Genres ===
Basseporte was best known as a botanical illustrator. In contact with many of the major botanists and naturalists of her time, she gained recognition for her illustrations of plants, shells, animals, birds, and sea creatures. Though adept in pastel portraiture, Basseporte chose to pursue botanical illustration because it provided a steady income with which to support her family. She worked more specifically in the genre of "peinture des plantes", taking a scientific approach to botanical illustration that focused more on plant structure than the flower. Her work stands at the intersection of art and science.

=== Influences ===
Basseporte's first teacher was the painter and engraver Paul-Ponce-Antoine Robert (also known as Robert de Sery). Under the patronage of the Cardinal de Rohan, Robert exposed Basseporte to the paintings of old masters in the Hôtel de Soubise and Palais-Royal in Paris. There, she found influence in the works of artists such as Rosalba Carriera.

After Robert's death, Basseporte was apprenticed to Claude Aubriet and eventually succeeded him as the official painter of the Jardin du roi, and adding to Les Vélins du Roi. During her time at the Jardin du Roi, Basseporte met the Swedish botanist Carolus Linnaeus. In 1739, naturalist and author Georges-Louis Leclerc, Comte de Buffon was appointed director of the Jardin du Roi; Basseporte was hired as official painter for the Jardin two years later. Some of her correspondence with Buffon still exists. Basseporte furthered her connections to the scientific community through Noel-Antoine Pluche, whose Spectacle de la nature she helped illustrate, and plant physiologist Henri-Louis Duhamel du Monceau. Monceau, working with the Académie des sciences, served to influence Basseporte's work during her tenure as an Académie dessinateur.

In addition to teaching royals and nobility, Basseporte is thought to have taught and heavily influenced artists such as Marie Therese Vien, [Jeanne Baret] and Anne Vallayer-Coster.

=== Work ===
Basseporte was a teacher to Louis XV's daughters and was responsible for educating them on the art of flower painting. It is during this time that she is believed to have also worked as an interior decorator for Madame de Pompadour, the king's official mistress. Basseporte's connections to major botanists of the time, such as the previously mentioned Carolus Linnaeus and Georges-Louis Leclerc, reveal the artist's status within the genre of botanical illustration. Despite this, however, there is very little additional information available on her. The majority of said information derives from the Louis Poinsinet de Sivry and Jean Castilhon's the "Notice", which can be found inside the 1781 volume of Le Nécrologe des hommes célèbres de France, par une société de gens de lettres.

Many of Basseporte's botanical illustrations, including those featured in attached external links below, were done in watercolor over pencil on vellum and measure about 15 x 12 inches. The ones included in below links belong to a series of 117 prints that were once incorrectly attributed to Pierre Joseph Redouté, an artist who worked much later than Basseporte, but are now believed to have been by Basseporte. By viewing samples of Basseporte's work from this series, one can see the variety of content in which Basseporte both studied and depicted - from the leafy and green Polygonatum Multifloratum (Solomon's seal) and Nepeta Glechoma (ground ivy) to the bright red delicate petals of the Papaver (poppy). Each of these are shown isolated as single specimens and are restricted within the confines of illustrated frames against a plain background.
