= Charlotte Eustace Sophie de Fuligny-Damas =

French artist (1741–1828)

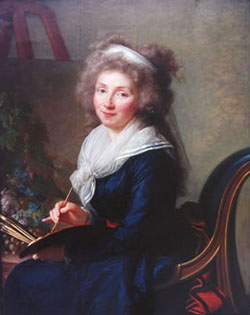
- Portrait of the Marquise by Élisabeth Vigée Le Brun
- Born: December 21, 1741; Paris, France
- Died: 1828 (aged 86–87); Épinay-sur-Seine, France
- Known for: Painting
- Spouse: Pierre Louis de Grollier (m. 1760–1793)

Charlotte Eustace Sophie de Fuligny-Damas, more commonly known as the Marquise de Grollier (21 December 1741, Paris – 1828, Épinay-sur-Seine), was a French flower painter.

== Biography ==
Her father was Henry Anne de Fuligny-Damas (1669–1745), Comte de Rochechouart, Baron de Couches, Marigny-sur-Ouche, Aubigny, Agey and Saint-Péreuse. She lost him at age three. When she turned seven, she was given into the care of the canonesses at Remiremont Abbey, where she received a classical education. After displaying a talent for drawing, she received lessons in Paris from Jean-Baptiste Greuze and Gérard van Spaendonck.

In 1760, de Fuligny-Damas married Pierre Louis de Grollier, Marquis de Grollier and Treffort (1730–1793), the Governor of Pont-d'Ain and Deputy of the Nobility. The couple would have three children before separating. Later, they lived at the court in Versailles, where the Marquise de Grollier became friends with the portrait painter Elisabeth Vigée Le Brun. Le Brun would often mention Grollier in her diaries, describing her as “always simple and natural, and never showed any pretension, nor an ounce of pedantry.” The Marquise was attracted to the gardens at Versailles and later created one of her own in Lainville-en-Vexin.

In 1793, de Fuligny-Damas lost her husband to the guillotine and was forced to leave France. She went to Switzerland, then Germany and, finally, Italy. In Florence, her talent was soon recognized. The sculptor, Antonio Canova, once referred to her as the "Raphael of flowers". At this time, she also created some mosaics. Joseph-Marie Vien, Director of the French Academy in Rome, arranged for her return to France. She settled in with her nephew, Alexandre-Charles-Emmanuel de Crussol, at his château in Épinay-sur-Seine, where she practiced horticulture as well as painting. After his death, she began to give large sums to charity in his name.

In 1793, her husband was killed by guillotine during the French Revolution, and was forced to leave France. She went to Switzerland, then Germany and, finally, Italy. In Florence, her talent was soon recognized. The sculptor, Antonio Canova, once referred to her as the "Raphael of flowers". At this time, she also created some mosaics. Joseph-Marie Vien, Director of the French Academy in Rome, arranged for her return to France. She settled with Alexandre-Charles-Emmanuel de Crussol—who she referred to as her "nephew" although they were not related and he was only one year younger—at his château in Épinay-sur-Seine, where she practiced horticulture as well as painting. After his death, she began to give large sums to charity in his name.

In 1823, she prevailed upon the engineer, Louis-Georges Mulot, to create an artesian aquifer in the château's park to provide clean drinking water for the local villagers. The work lasted for three years. In recognition for her efforts, she was named one of the founding members of the "Société d'Horticulture". She died shortly after, aged 86.

== Works ==
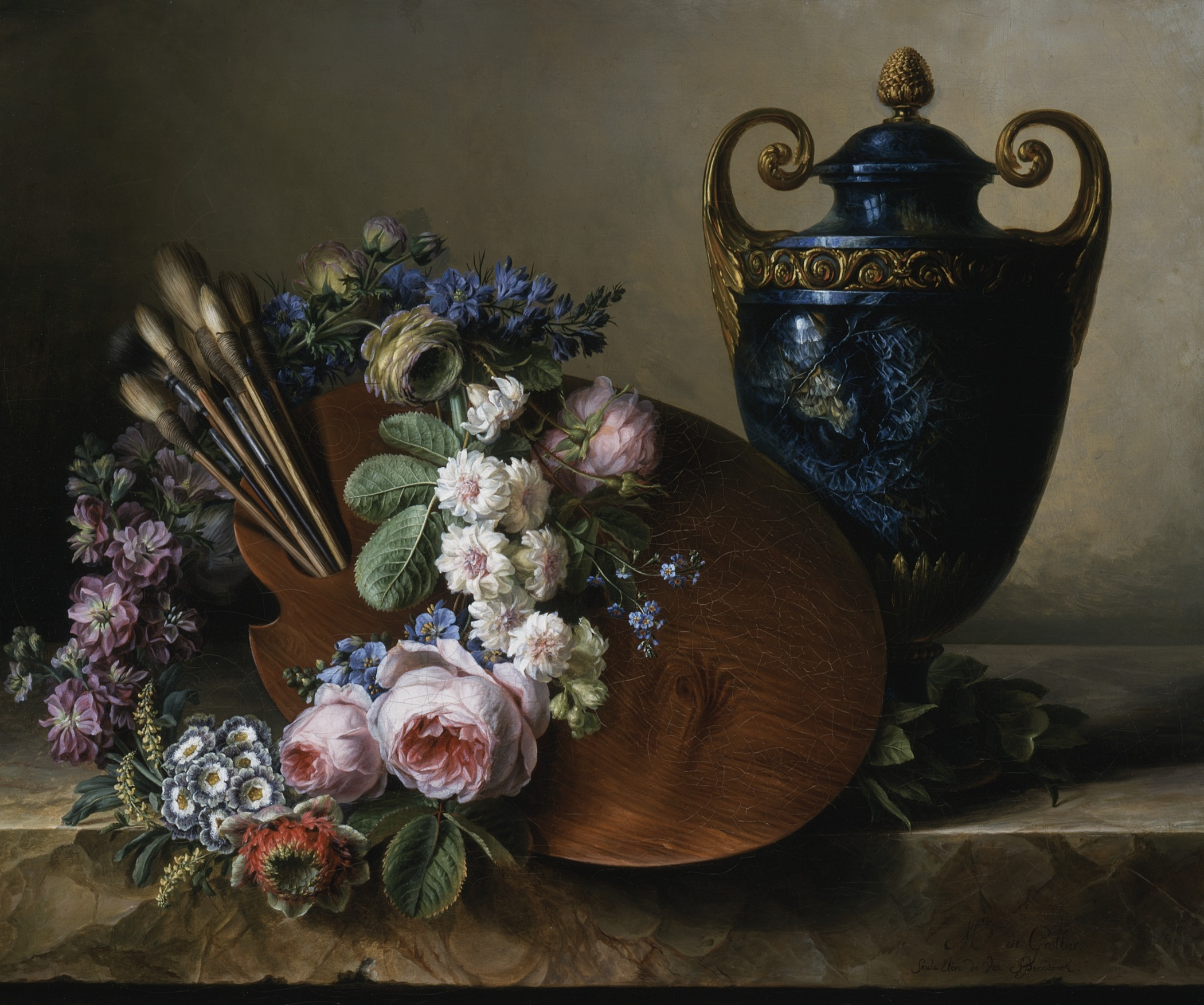
Homage to Van Spaendonck

It is not known how many works by the Marquise de Grollier survive today, since she did not exhibit or sell her art during her lifetime; instead, she gave almost all of her works to her immediate family. There is also some evidence that she gave art as gifts to those in her immediate social circle, including the Empress Josephine.

In August 2022, the Metropolitan Museum of Art in New York acquired her painting Still Life with a Vase of Flowers, Melon, Peaches, and Grapes, painted in 1780, which was initially bequeathed to her daughter. It remained with her family until it was sold through Galerie Canesso in Paris in 2021. The painting is due to go on view at the museum in 2023, as part of its Skylights Project renovation.

The Los Angeles Country Museum of Art has another work in its collection, Still life. An Homage to Van Spaendonck, which it acquired in 1996; the work is not currently on public view.
