= Jean-Louis Castilhon =

Jean-Louis Castilhon (1721, Toulouse – 24 August 1798, Bouillon) was an 18th-century French man of letters and encyclopedist.

The brother of journalist and writer Jean Castilhon, Jean-Louis Castilhon was a prolific author who contributed to a large number of periodicals, including the Journal de jurisprudence of which he was the director.

He married Philippine Lembert in Bouillon on October 3, 1766.

He gave the Supplément à l'Encyclopédie about 400 articles devoted to history.

== Works ==
(selection)

- 1766: Essai sur les erreurs et les superstitions modernes, Francfort, Knoë et Eslinger
- 1767: Almanach philosophique
- 1769: Histoire des dogmes et opinions philosophiques
- 1769: Considérations sur les causes physiques et morales de la diversité du génie, des mœurs des nations, 3 vol., etc.
- 1770: Essai de philosophie morale
- 1770: Le Diogène moderne, ou le Désapprobateur, tiré en partie des manuscrits de sir Charles Wolban, et de sa correspondance avec sir George Bedfort, sir Olivier Stewert, etc., sur différens sujets de littérature, de morale et de philosophie, Bouillon, Société typographique
- 1770: Le Mendiant boîteux, ou Les aventures d’Ambroise Gwinett, balayeur du pavé de Spring-Garden, Bouillon, Société typographique
- 1771: Candide anglois, ou Avantures tragi-comiques d’Ambroise Gwinett avant et dans ses voyages aux deux Indes, Francfort et Leipzig, aux dépens de la Compagnie
- 1773: Zingha, reine d’Angola, Bourges, Ganymède ISBN 2950735800

== Sources ==
- Ferdinand Hoefer, Nouvelle Biographie générale, t. 9, Paris, Firmin-Didot, 1854, (p. 118).
- Bouillon, registres paroissiaux des mariages et des sépultures de 1763 à 1795.
