= Pancrace Bessa =

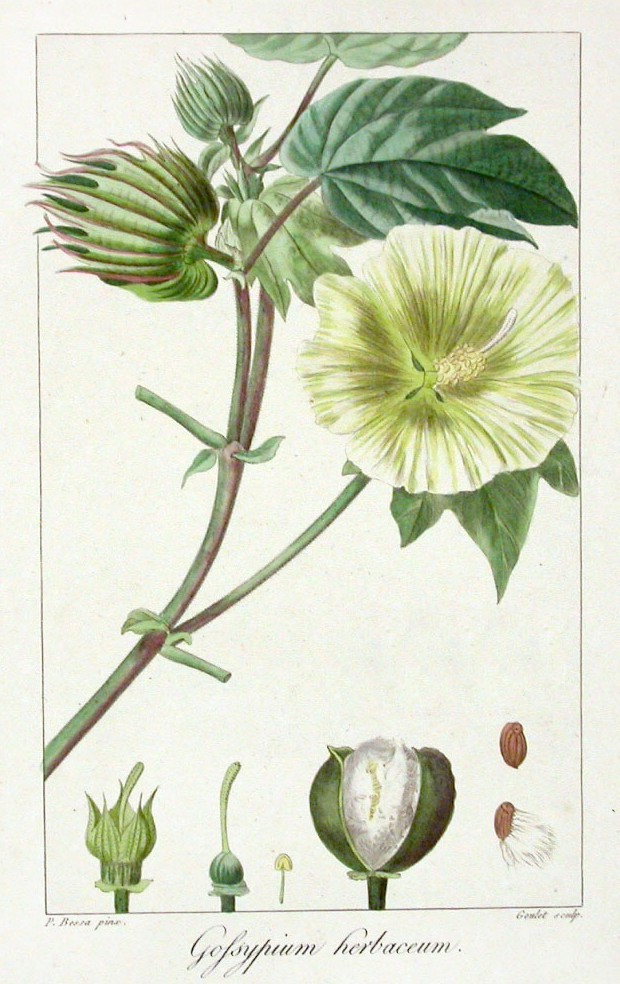
- Gossypium herbaceum by Pancrace Bessa
- Born: 1 January 1772
- Died: 11 June 1846 (aged 74)
- Occupation: natural history artist

Pancrace Bessa (1 January 1772 – 11 June 1846) was a French natural history artist, best known for his botanical illustrations. Bessa was a student of the great engraver Gerard van Spaendonck and worked alongside Pierre-Joseph Redouté, some of whose influence shows in Bessa's detailed and delicate treatment of his subjects. He was a regular exhibitor at the Paris Salons between 1806 and 1831. The standard author abbreviation Bessa is used to indicate this person as the author when citing a botanical name.

Bessa's favourite subjects were fruit and flowers, with occasional digressions to birds and mammals. In 1816, the Duchesse de Berry, daughter-in-law of King Charles X of France, extended her patronage to him, which led to his giving painting lessons to the de Berry family. Their art connections went back to the Très Riches Heures du Duc de Berry. Bessa also worked on the French royal watercolour collection on vellum the Velins du Roi from 1823 until his death.

In the early nineteenth century, Bessa, Redouté, Jean-Louis Prévost, Lancelot-Théodore Turpin de Crissé, and Madame Vincent raised France to pre-eminence in the genre of botanical painting. Bessa developed a masterful use of stipple engraving technique, an essential part of colour printing. Bessa and Redoute collaborated on the Histoire des Arbres Forestiers de L'Amerique Septentrionale, which appeared between 1810 and 1813. He prepared some 572 watercolours for L'Herbier Général de L'Amateur by Mordant de Launey and Loiseleur Longchamp, which appeared between 1810 and 1826. Description des Plantes cultivees a Malmaison a Navarre used 9 of Bessa's illustrations and 54 by Redouté.

Bessa’s final work was Flore des Jardiniers, published in 1836.

== Gallery ==
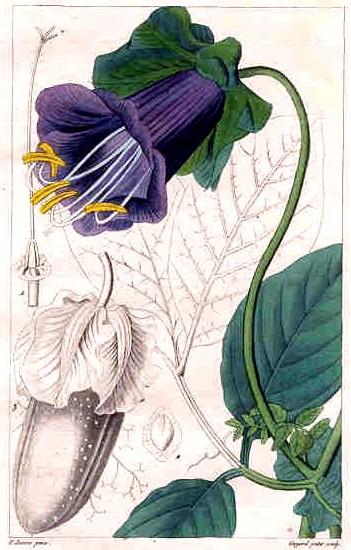
Cobaea scandens

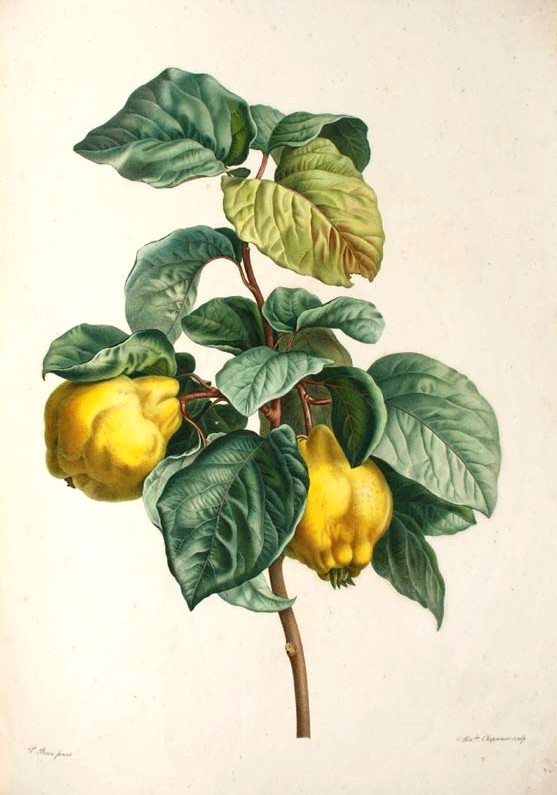
Cydonia oblonga

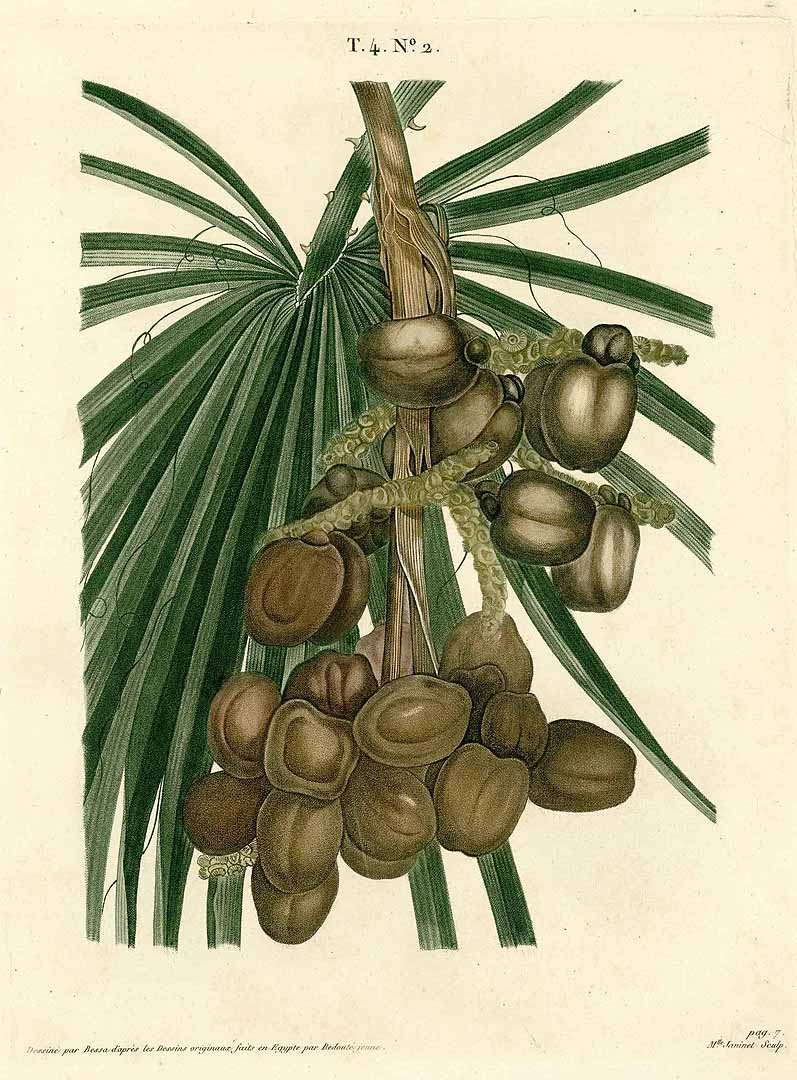
Hyphaene thebaica

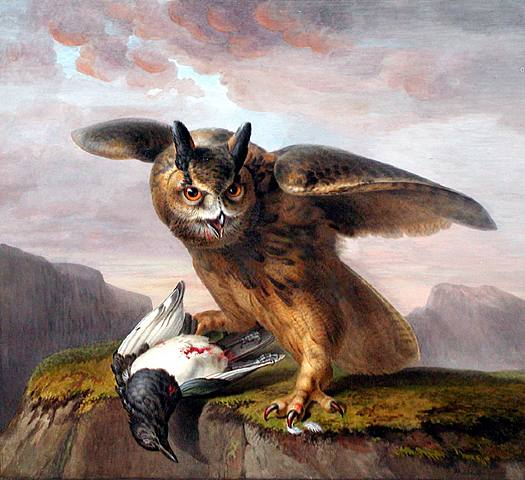
Eurasian eagle-owl with European magpie
