= Louis-Georges Mulot =

French engineer and entrepreneur

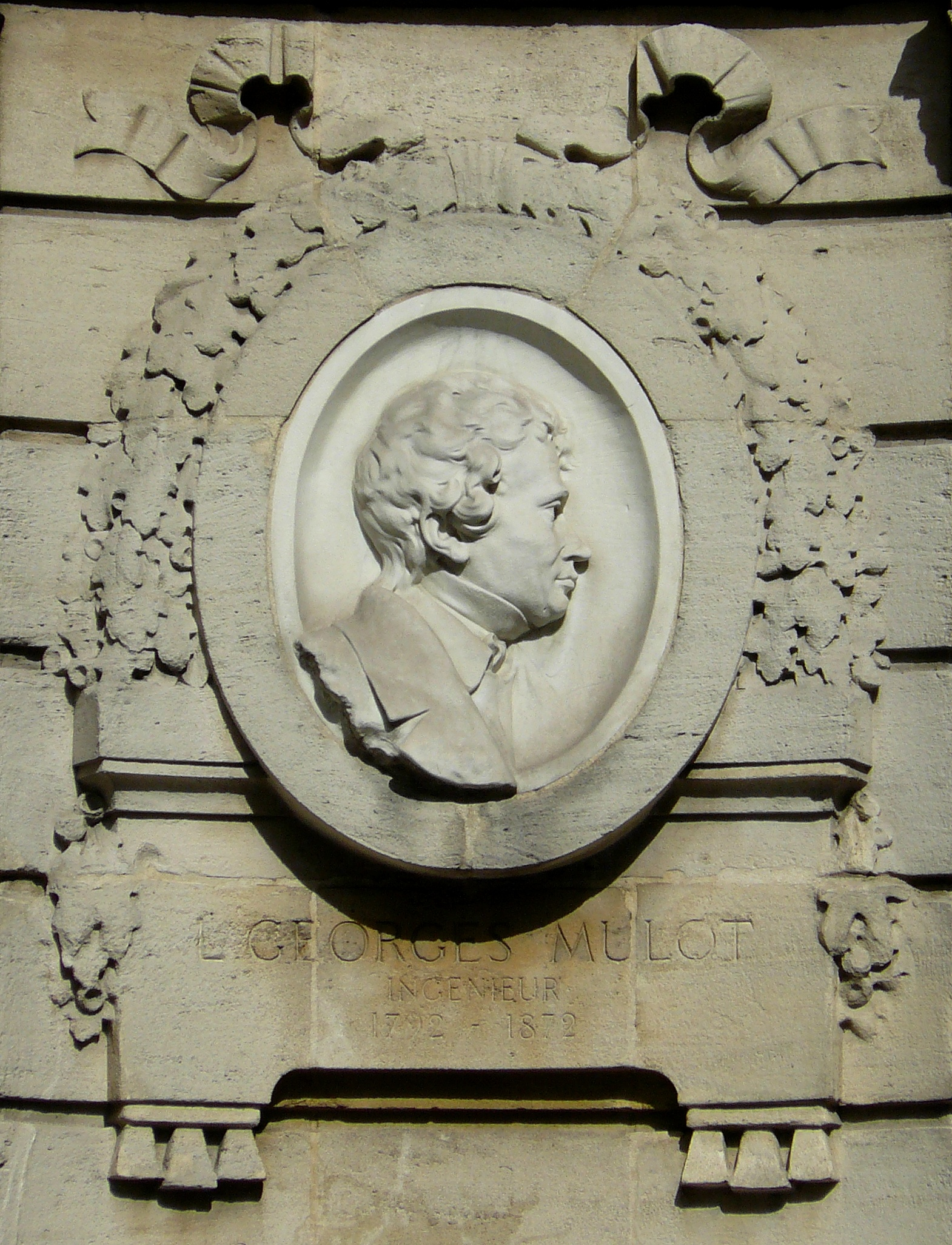
Georges Mulot; medallion on the Fontaine du puits de Grenelle

Louis-Georges Mulot (English: /mjuːˈloʊ/ myoo-LOH, French: [lwi ʒɔʁʒ mylo]; 14 September 1792, Épinay-sur-Seine - 11 April 1872, Paris) was a French engineer and entrepreneur. He helped create numerous artesian wells in Paris and was the founder of the Compagnie des mines de Dourges; one of the first extensions of the Nord-Pas de Calais Mining Basin.

== Biography ==
His father was a locksmith; originally from Vaubexy. After inheriting his father's tools, he proved to be very skillful with his hands; mending shotguns and clocks as well as locks. He also invented a device to improve the process of grating potatoes into potato starch and repaired a steamboat that had been stranded on the Seine.

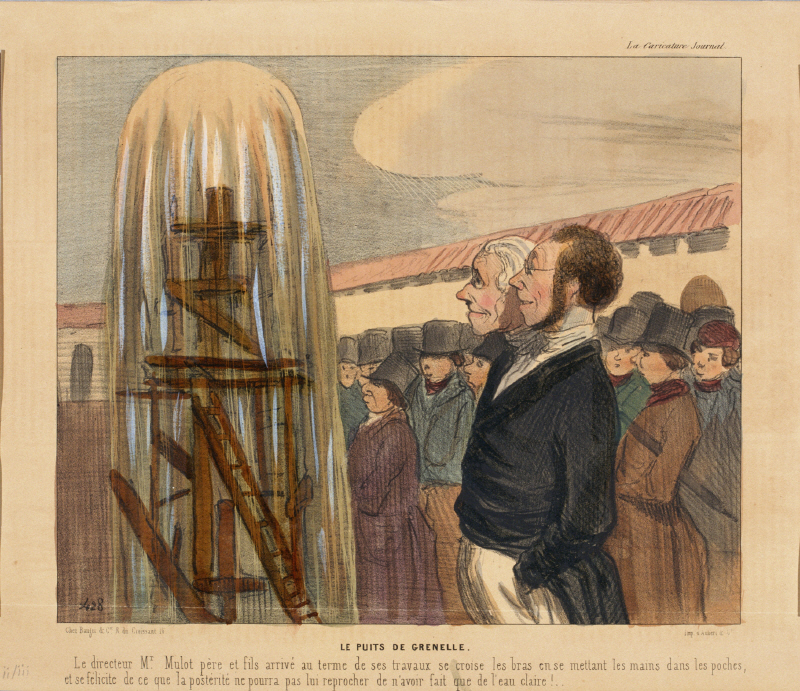
Mulot and his son at their first well; caricature by Honoré Daumier

In 1823, he was called to Enghien-les-Bains to repair the tools of workers who were digging an artesian well. He watched them at work and learned the process. Upon returning home, he created his own tools and dug his first well on the property of the Marquise de Grollier, an artist who specialized in flower painting. He then dug similar wells in Tours, Elbeuf and Saint-Gratien.

In 1834, at the suggestion of François Arago, a noted scientist who was serving as the Conseil Général of the Seine, and Louis-Étienne Héricart de Thury, an engineer, he undertook his first well drilling project in Paris, in the courtyard of the Abattoirs de Grenelle. After seven years, drilling to 548 meters (1,798 feet), he struck water. He went on to create more wells throughout France and Algeria. The one at Grenelle went dry only recently.

While searching for drilling locations in Dourges and Hénin-Beaumont, he discovered the first indication that coal fields existed beyond Douai. This was initially kept secret. At the end of 1848, he and other interested parties applied for a concession. Rival claims from the Compagnie des mines de l'Escarpelle and the Compagnie des mines de Courrières delayed the process.

A decree in August of 1852 established a concession of 3,787 hectares (app. 9,358 acres) in the environs of Dourges, followed shortly by the creation of the Compagnie des mines de Dourges.

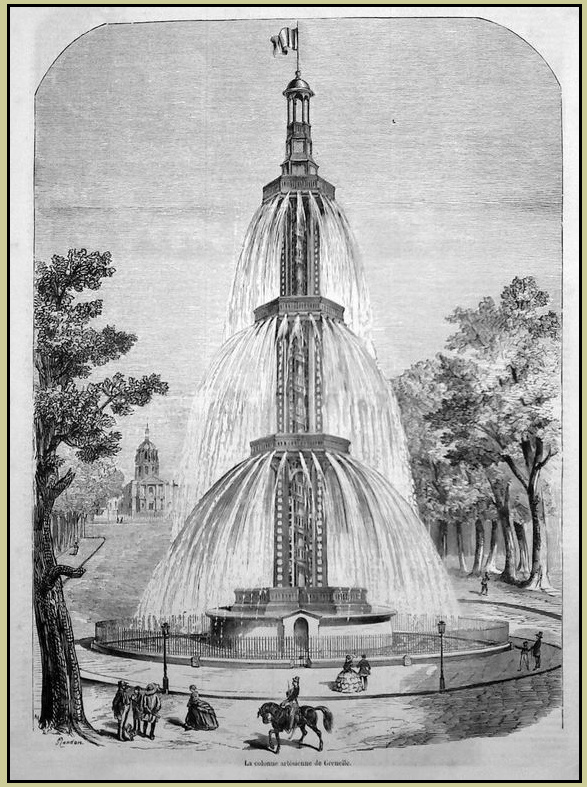
One of the first artesian wells in Grenelle

Capitalizing on this success, he began engineering large structures, with a cement drilling and pouring technique of his won devising. He also participated in the construction of some railways. He was named Knight in the Legion of Honor by King Louis-Philippe I and obtained a lifetime annuity of 3,000 Francs.
