= Charles Henry Dessalines d'Orbigny =

French botanist and geologist

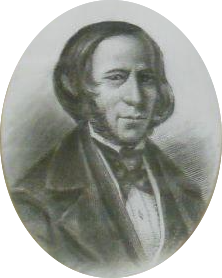
- Born: December 2, 1806; Couëron, France
- Died: February 14, 1876; Paris
- Scientific career
- Fields: Botany; Geology
- Institutions: Muséum national d'histoire naturelle

Charles Henry Dessalines d'Orbigny (1806–1879) was a French botanist and geologist specializing in the Tertiary of France. He was the younger brother of French naturalist and South American explorer, Alcide d'Orbigny. At the National Museum of Natural History in Paris, d'Orbigny classified many of the flowering plant species returned to France from his brother's natural history collecting journeys through South America.
