= Marie Marguerite Bihéron =

French artist (1719–1795)

Marie Marguerite Bihéron (17 November 1719 – 18 June 1795) (also known as Marie Catherine Bihéron) was a French anatomist, known for her medical illustrations and wax figure models.

== Biography ==
Bihéron was the daughter of a French apothecary, born in 1719. She studied illustration at the Jardin du Roi and with Madeleine Basseporte, of whom little is known outside of her anatomical drawings, and the memoirs of contemporaries.

To procure bodies for her anatomical studies, Bihéron was forced to have them stolen from the military. Frustrated with their rapid putrefaction, and at the suggestion of Basseporte, Bihéron turned her skills towards anatomical wax modeling, becoming a leading and highly recognized practitioner of this art. The famous physician Villoisin and the scholar Jussieu were impressed, and both promoted her work. In 1759, Jean Morand invited her to present her work to the Academie Royale des Sciences. She was invited again in 1770, to demonstrate an innovative, very detailed and lifelike model of a pregnant woman, complete with moveable parts and fetuses. In 1771 she presented to the Academie Royale for the third time, this time presenting her models to the visiting crown prince of Sweden, Gustavus of Sweden.

Her models achieved international renown, both because of their great anatomical accuracy and lifelikeness, and because she apparently had a method of making wax models that did not melt. Jakob Jonas Björnståhl wrote to Carl Linnaeus, that:

Björnståhl has witnessed an anatomical miracle. Marie Catherine Biheron[+] makes models of parts of the body that are absolutely lifelike. And they do not break. She does not reveal what material they are made of, although it seems as if they were made of wax mixed with something. All parts are correctly named in Latin and Greek. She has studied this art for more than 20 years. The King of Denmark Christian VII is one of her customers. She sends her respects to Linnaeus.

Because the Academie did not support women, Bihéron had to earn a living privately, by exhibiting and selling her models, as well as by teaching. She moved to England, because women were not permitted to teach anatomy in France. Among her students was John Hunter, a Scottish doctor who greatly advanced the field of surgery — Bihéron's anatomical lessons were critical to his study, and some of the illustrations in his book were likely Bihéron's. Diderot was also apparently one of her anatomy students.

Bihéron also earned money by selling her models. The King of Denmark was one customer, and Empress Catherine II of Russia another; the latter purchasing Bihéron's complete set of anatomical models. Exhibitions included a 1761 exhibition, advertised by her pamphlet "Artificial Anatomy", proposing to show the body in "greatest precision", including internal organs, which could be manipulated—Bihéron permitted viewing at her home on the Vieille Estrapade near the Rue des Poules, beginning on 13 May 1761, and continued for some time.

== See also ==
- Anna Morandi Manzolini
