= Claude Aubriet =

French painter (1665–1742)

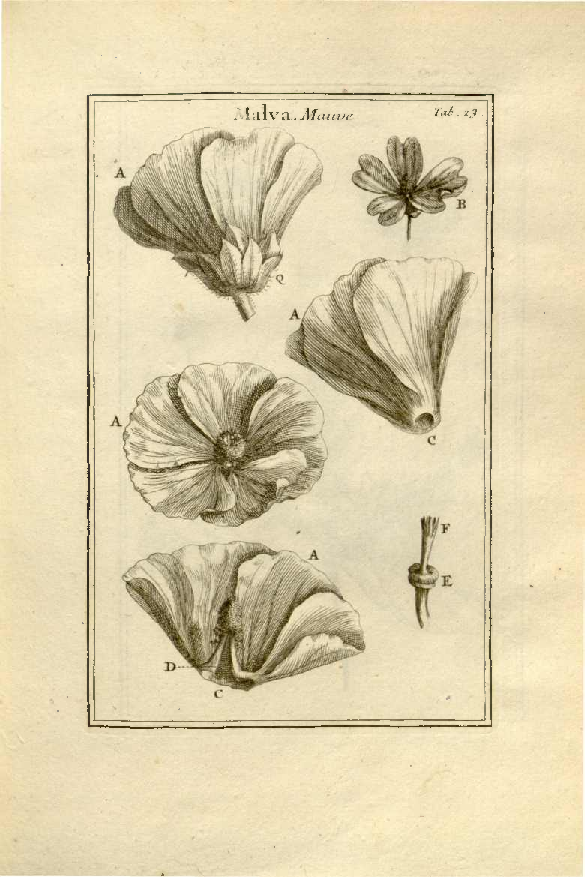
A Malva, illustrations for Tournefort's Institutiones

Claude Aubriet (c. 1651 or 1665 – 3 December 1742) was a French illustrator and botanical artist. The standard author abbreviation Aubriet is used to indicate this person as the author when citing a botanical name.

== Biography ==
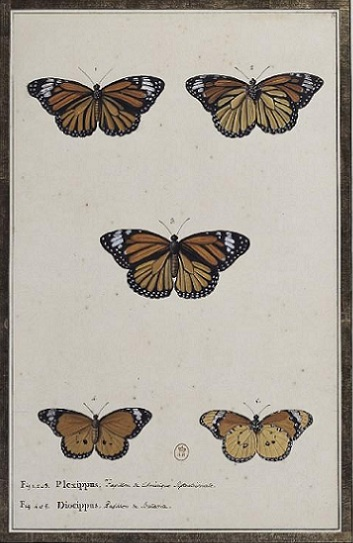
Two butterflies, by Claude Aubriet

Aubriet was born in Châlons-en-Champagne or in Moncetz.

He was a botanical illustrator at the Jardin du Roi in Paris. There Joseph Pitton de Tournefort (1656–1708) noticed his work and commissioned him as illustrator of his 1694 Elemens de Botanique. From 1700 to 1702 he accompanied Tournefort and Andreas von Gundelsheimer on an expedition to the Middle East. There he made drawings of historical sites and the region's flora. After his return to Paris, Aubriet continued his work with the botanists at the Jardin du Roi, contributing to Les Vélins du Roi.

In 1707 Aubriet succeeded Jean Joubert (1643–1707) as the royal botanical painter. He retired in 1735, and was succeeded by Françoise Basseporte (1701–1780), a student of his and a former collaborator. He died in Paris.

Botanist Michel Adanson named the genus Aubrieta in his honour.

== Selected works ==
Aubriet illustrated two books which were landmarks in the history of botany :

- (in Latin) Joseph Pitton de Tournefort, Institutiones rei herbariae See for example volume 2 of the third edition (with additions by Antoine de Jussieu) of the Institutiones. Paris. Imprimerie Royale : 1719
- (in Latin) Sébastien Vaillant, Botanicon Parisense, p. PA225, at Google Books. Leyde and Amsterdam. Jean & Herman Verbeek and Balthazar Lakeman : 1727.

We also have a number of collections of his drawings:

- Recueil de plantes, fleurs, fruits, oiseaux, insectes et coquillages, etc. peint en miniature sur vélin (Collection of plants, flowers, fruits, birds, insects and shellfish, etc., painted in miniature on vellum)
- Papillons plantes et fleurs (Butterflies plants and flowers)
- Plantes peintes à la gouache (Plants painted in gouache)
- Recueil d'oiseaux (Collection of birds)
- Collection d'aquarelles, 7 p.
- Plantes peintes en miniature.

== Bibliography ==
- De Sloover, Jean-Louis (1997). Les Muscinées du Botanicon parisiense (1727) de Sébastien Vaillant. Presses universitaires de Namur. ISBN 9782870372579.
- Jean-Louis De Sloover et Anne-Marie Bogaert-Damin (1999). Les Muscinées du XVIe au XIXe siècle dans les collections de la Bibliothèque universitaire Moretus Plantin, Namur, Presses universitaires de Namur, 257 p. ISBN 2-87037-270-1
- Aline Hamonou-Mahieu, Claude Aubriet, artiste naturaliste des Lumières, CTHS Sciences ISBN 978-2-7355-0703-0
