= Axel Duboul =

French diplomat and historian

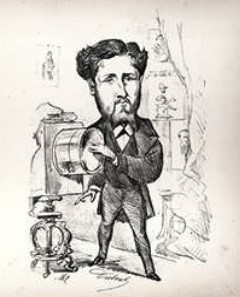
- Caricature of Duboul by Joseph Mollard c.1869
- Born: Henri Théodore Axel Duboul; 18 March 1842; Toulouse, France
- Died: 10 July 1902 (aged 60); Toulouse, France
- Occupations: historian; diplomat

Henri Théodore Axel Duboul (18 March 1842 – 10 July 1902) was a French diplomat, man of letters, and historian whose specialty was the history of Toulouse.

Duboul was in born in Toulouse and served as the French consul at Galați in Romania between 1873 and 1874, then at Bilbao in Spain between 1874 and 1877.

He is known for his history of the Académie des Jeux floraux as well as his skill as an orator. He was elected to the academy in 1891 and occupied its eighth chair from 1892. (Note: The Académie des Jeux floraux has 40 elected members known as "Maintainers" (Mainteneurs) at any one time. Each Maintainer occupies a numbered "Chair" (Fauteuil).)

He died in the city of his birth at the age of 60. The street rue Sainte-Catherine in Toulouse was renamed rue Axel Duboul in 1930 to honour his contribution to the life of the city. He had served there as both a city councilor and as a councilor of the Haute-Garonne department.

== Works ==
- Las Plantos as camps, glossaire patois (1890).
- La Fin du Parlement de Toulouse (1890).
- L'Armée révolutionnaire de Toulouse. Épisode d'une rivalité de clochers (1891).
- Le Tribunal révolutionnaire de Toulouse, 25 nivôse - 3 floréal an II — 14 janvier - 22 avril 1794 (1894).
- Les Deux Siècles de l'Académie des Jeux floraux (1901).
