= Henriette Vincent =

French botanical painter

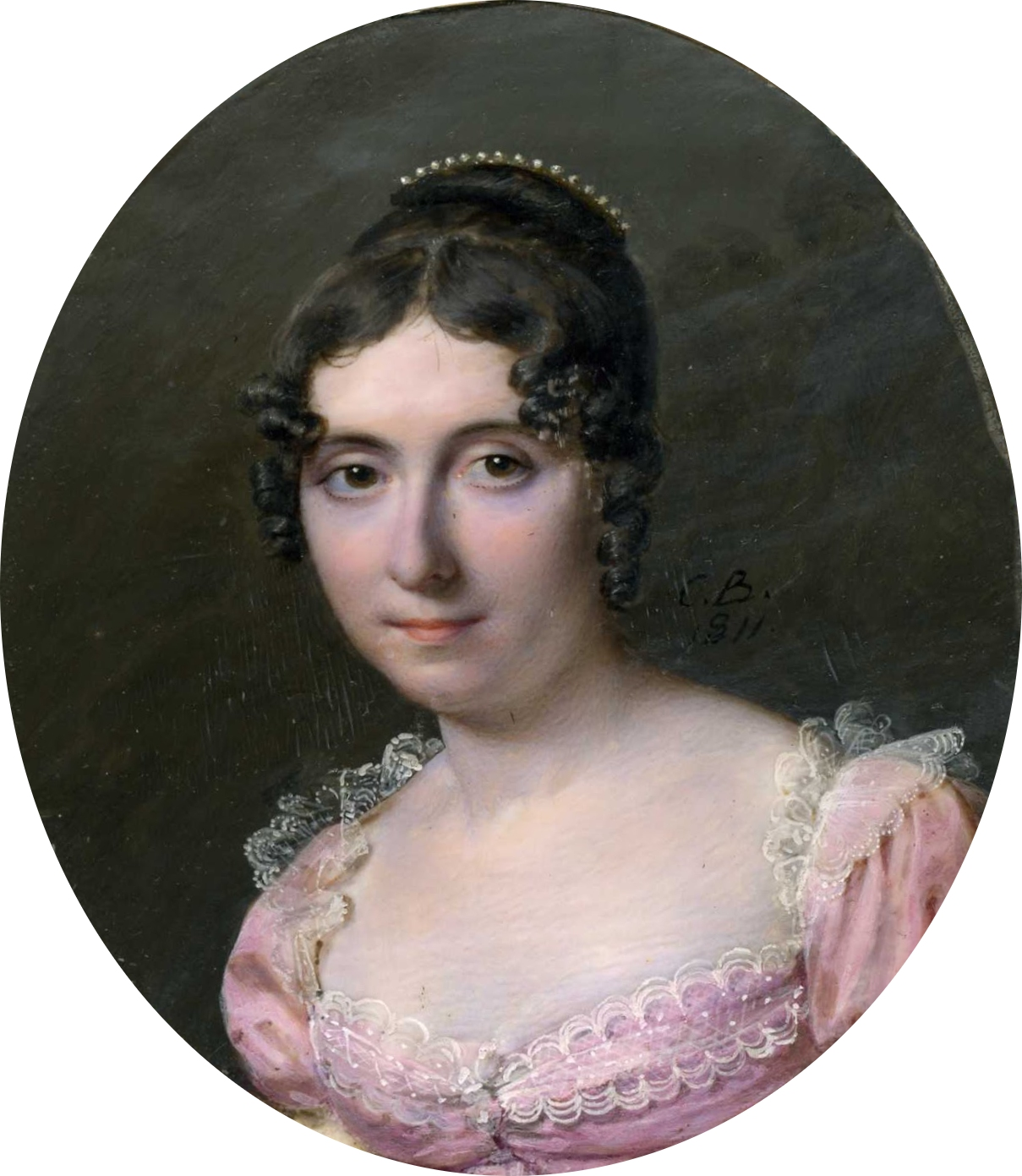
Portrait of Henriette-Antoinette Vincent, 1811

Henriette Vincent (1786–1834) was an early 19th-century botanical painter at the French court.

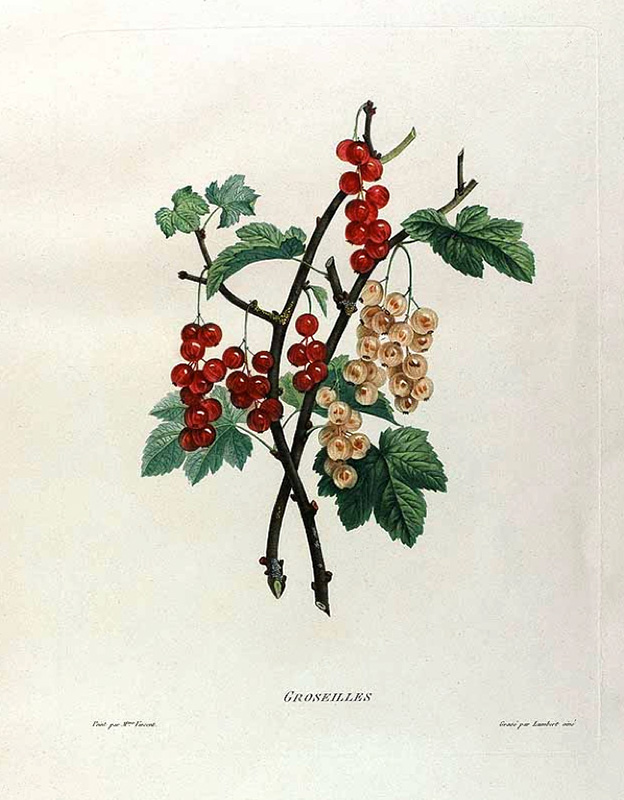
Red currant (Ribes rubrum), engraving after a painting by Henriette Vincent, 1820.

== Early life ==
Henriette Antoinette Rideau du Sal was born in Brest, France, in May 1786. Her father, Marcel-Henry Rideau du Sal, was a naval chief commissioner, while her mother was a descendant of St. Malo corsairs. In August 1803, shortly after her father's death, she married Ambroise Mery Vincent (1776-1863), a local marine engineer who was working for the port of Brest's naval artillery service and to whom she had given lessons. The following year, they had a son, Aristide Vincent (1804–1879), who as an adult became a businessman, farmer, and Fourierist journalist in Brest.

On Ambroise's marriage, his family settled property in the nearby town of Roscanvel on him, and he built some kilns on this land because he had ambitions to get into the ceramics and brickmaking business. He abandoned this ambition to help support his wife's career as a painter. They moved to Paris, where he got a job as superintendent of the gardens at the future Empress Josephine's residence, Château de Malmaison, just outside the city. By 1814, he would rise to be superintendent of imperial buildings in Compiègne, a job lost he almost immediately when Napoleon abdicated his throne the following year. Within a decade, he had recovered his fortunes sufficiently to be able to buy the former Landévennec Abbey near Brest, and he turned to property management, with mixed results.

== Education and career ==
Henriette studied painting in Paris with Gerard van Spaendonck and Pierre-Joseph Redouté, both of whom were noted flower painters and French court artists. Redouté in particular spent much time painting the roses and other flowers in the garden at Malmaison during the reign of Napoleon. Under their tutelage, she developed into an exceptional artist who rivaled Redouté in her handling of color. She worked professionally under her married name of Henriette Vincent, sometimes styling herself "Madame Vincent" (not to be confused with the painter Adélaïde Labille-Guiard, who is also sometimes referred to under that title). Her connection with Redouté led to a number of opportunities for commissioned work, and she was able to exhibit her work in the Paris Salon of 1814, 1819, 1822, and 1824. These accomplishments were rare for women artists of the period, who had few opportunities to gain the kind of advanced training that would lead to commissions and allow them to become self-supporting.

Henriette Vincent's magnum opus was Studies of Flowers and Fruits Painted from Life (original title: Études de fleurs et de fruits: Peints d'après nature). First published in Paris in 1820 with 48 hand-finished color engravings by Lambert the elder, it was republished the same year in London with hand-colored aquatints by T. L. Busby that reversed the images in the original volume. It was dedicated to "young women", presumably those who might follow in Madame Vincent's footsteps. The subjects of the watercolors included common flowers like tulips, pinks, narcissus, hyacinths, carnations, and anemones; the fruits depicted included grapes, cherries, plums, and strawberries. The finely detailed, naturalistic images typically show clusters of flowers and fruits with their leaves against a plain background and may be further particularized by such details as water droplets, a ladybug sitting on a leaf, or butterflies flitting nearby. Although not notable for scientific exactitude, Vincent's paintings continue to be appreciated as masterpieces of delicacy and beauty from the heyday of the florilegium. Only five copies of the book are now known to exist; institutions holding copies include the British Museum and the Chicago Botanic Garden.

In 1831, Madame Vincent retired to the Landévennec Abbey, and she died there a few years later, in 1834, not yet out of her forties. In 1835, a second, posthumous volume of her work was published: A Collection of 24 Flower Bouquets (Collection de 24 Bouquets de Fleurs). The bouquets featured two to five different kinds of flowers, some in a loose bunch and others in vases or bowls. The plates were stipple engravings (again produced by Lambert) in full color with extensive hand finishing. Stippling, which Madame Vincent probably learned from her teacher Redouté who was renowned for using this dotted technique, is well suited to representing the texture of flowers but poses extra challenges to the engraving process. The book, which is a comparatively small volume of 11 x 8.25 inches, has been praised as of "such consummate loveliness" that it enhances the overall reputation of French floral painters of the era.

Madame Vincent's work was included in the 2013 show "The Feminine Perspective: Women Artists and Illustrators" organized by the Lenhardt Library of the Chicago Botanic Garden.
