= Gerard van Spaendonck =

Dutch painter

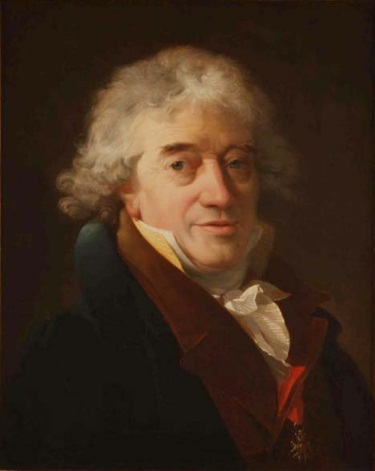
- Portrait by Nicolas-Antoine Taunay
- Born: 22 March 1746; Tilburg, Netherlands
- Died: 11 May 1822 (aged 76); Paris, France
- Resting place: Père Lachaise Cemetery
- Movement: Institut de France
- Awards: Légion d'honneur

Gerard van Spaendonck (22 March 1746 – 11 May 1822) was a Dutch painter.

== Life ==
Gerard was born in Tilburg, an older brother of Cornelis van Spaendonck (1756–1840), who was also an accomplished artist. In the 1760s he studied with decorative painter Willem Jacob Herreyns (also known as Guillaume-Jacques Herreyns) (1743–1827) in Antwerp. In 1769 he moved to Paris, where in 1774 he was appointed miniature painter in the court of Louis XVI. In 1780 he succeeded Madeleine Françoise Basseporte (1701–1780) as professor of floral painting at the Jardin des Plantes, and shortly afterwards was elected as a member of the Académie des beaux-arts. Among his pupils were Pierre-Joseph Redouté and Henriette Vincent.

Gerard van Spaendonck painted with both oil and watercolors. He contributed over fifty works to Les Vélins du Roi, a famous collection of botanical watercolors possessed by French royalty. From 1799 to 1801 he published twenty-four plates of Fleurs Dessinees d'apres Nature (Flowers Drawn from Life), which were high-quality engravings for students of floral painting. Today, Spaendonck's Fleurs Dessinées d'après Nature is a highly treasured book on floral art.

In 1788 he was appointed adviser to the Académie, and in 1795 became a founding member of the Institut de France. In 1804 he received the Légion d'honneur and soon afterwards was ennobled by Napoleon Bonaparte.

Spaendonck died in Paris in 1822 and is buried in the Père Lachaise Cemetery.

== Gallery ==
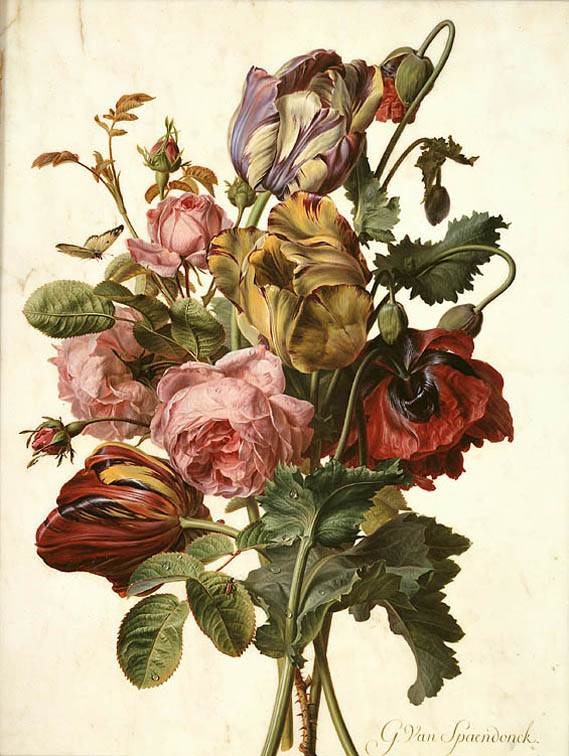
Bouquet of tulips, roses and an opium poppies, with a pale clouded yellow butterfly, a red longhorn beetle and a sevenspotted ladybug

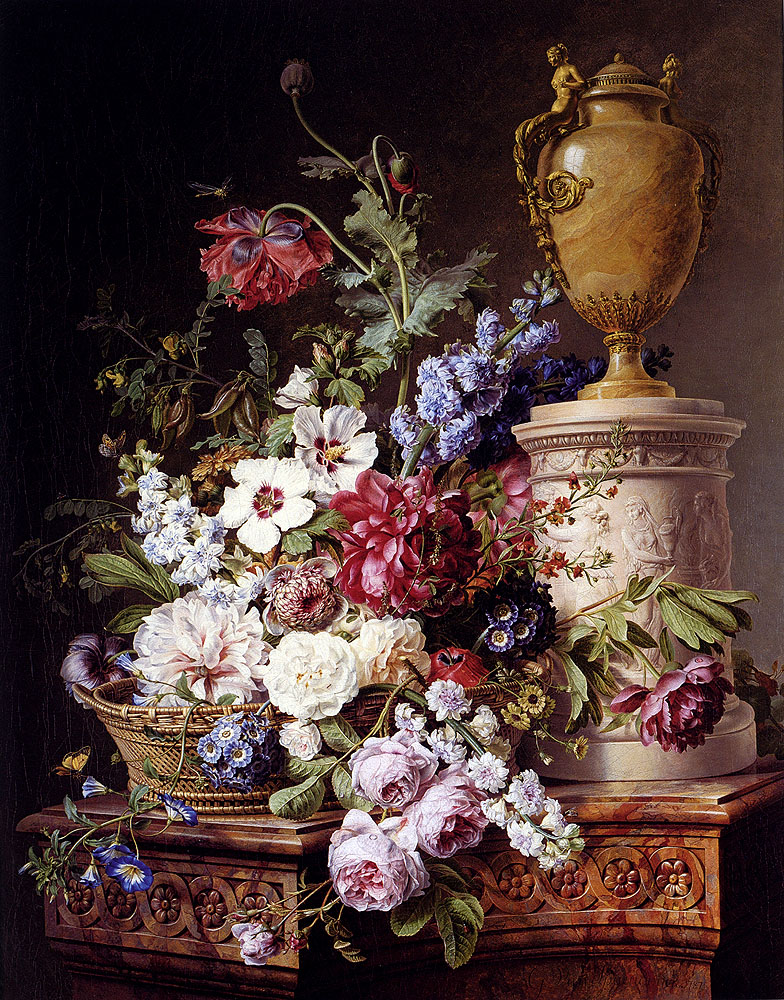
Still life of flowers in a basket with two butterflies, a dragonfly, a fly and a beetle near an alabaster urn on a marble pedestal

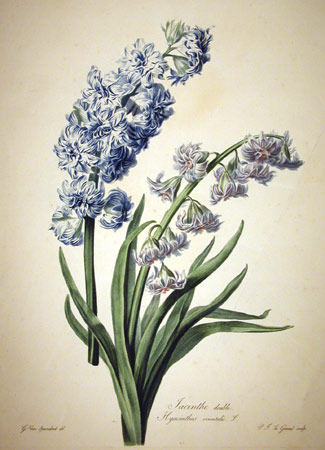
Jacinthe double.

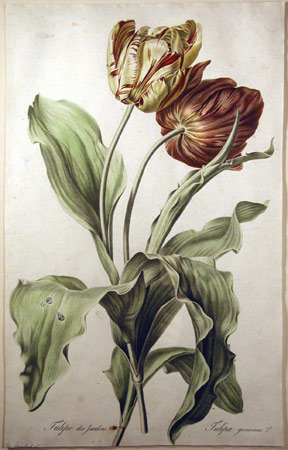
Tulipe des jardins.
