= Franz Kiggelaer =

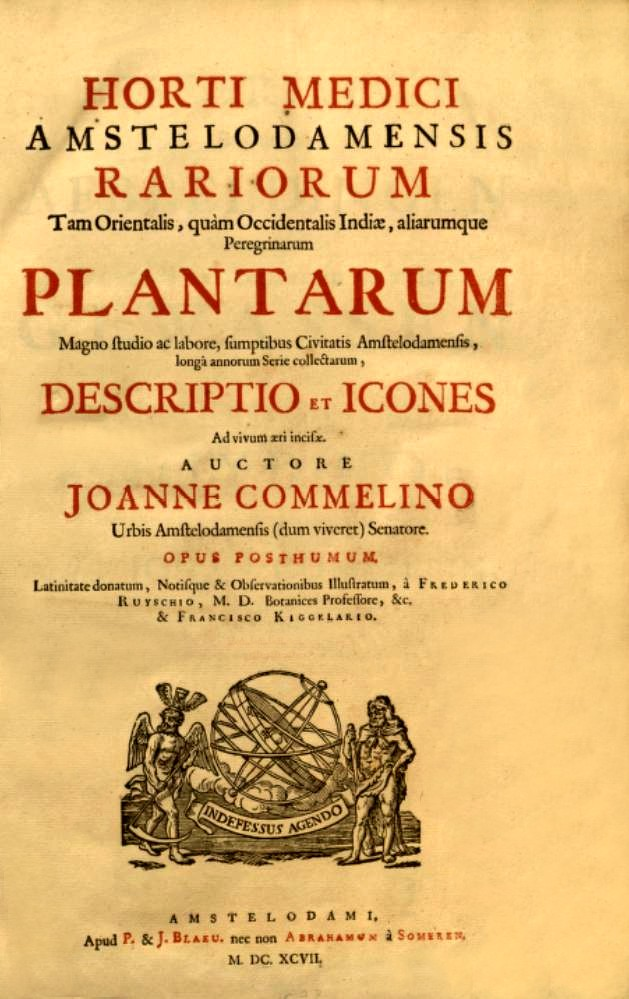

François, Franciscus, or Frans Kiggelaer (baptized 4 December 1648, in Haarlem – buried 22 December 1722, in The Hague) was a Dutch botanist, apothecary and curator of the garden of Simon van Beaumont in Leiden. In 1690, he published a plant catalogue of this garden under the title "Horti Beaumontiani: Exoticarum Plantarum Catalogus ...".

He collaborated with Frederik Ruysch on the first volume of Jan Commelijn's "Horti Medici Amstelodamensis Rariorum" which appeared in 1697 and dealt mainly with plants from the East and West Indies. This was an illustrated account, with text in Dutch and Latin, of the plants growing in van Beaumont's garden. Watercolours of 420 plants were prepared during the period 1686–1709 by a number of artists, mainly Johan and Maria Moninckx, with minor contributions from Helena Herolt and Alida Withoos. Carl Linnaeus named the genus Kiggelaria, belonging to Achariaceae, in his honour.

== Publications ==
- Horti medici amstelodamensis rariorum tam Orientalis :quam Occidentalis Indiæ, aliarumque peregrinarum plantarum, magno studio ac labore, sumptibus Civitatis amstelodamensis, longâ annorum serie collectarum, descriptio et icones ad vivum æri incisæ /auctore Joanne Commelino. Opus posthumum, latinitate donatum, notisque & observationibus illustratum, à Frederico Ruyschio & Francisco Kiggelario.
