= Caspar Commelijn =

Dutch botanist (1668–1731)

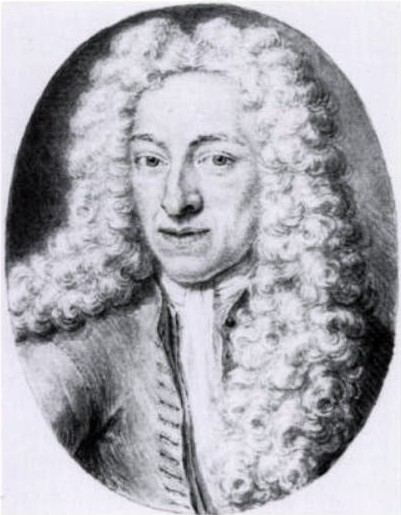
Caspar Commelijn

Caspar Commelijn or Caspar Commelin (14 October 1668 Amsterdam – 25 December 1731 Amsterdam), was a Dutch botanist.

== Life and work ==
He was the son of the bookseller, historian and publisher, Casparus Commelijn and his first wife, Margrieta Heydanus. His grandfather was Isaac Commelin. He enrolled on 12 September 1692 at Leiden as a student of medicine and graduated on 27 February 1694 with a dissertation De lumbricis ("About earthworms", Ludg. Bat. 1694). After graduation, he settled in his birthplace. When Peter Hotton departed for Leiden in 1696, Caspar was appointed to the post of botanist at the Hortus. He succeeded his uncle Jan Commelin, who together with Joan Huydecoper founded the Hortus Botanicus Amsterdam.

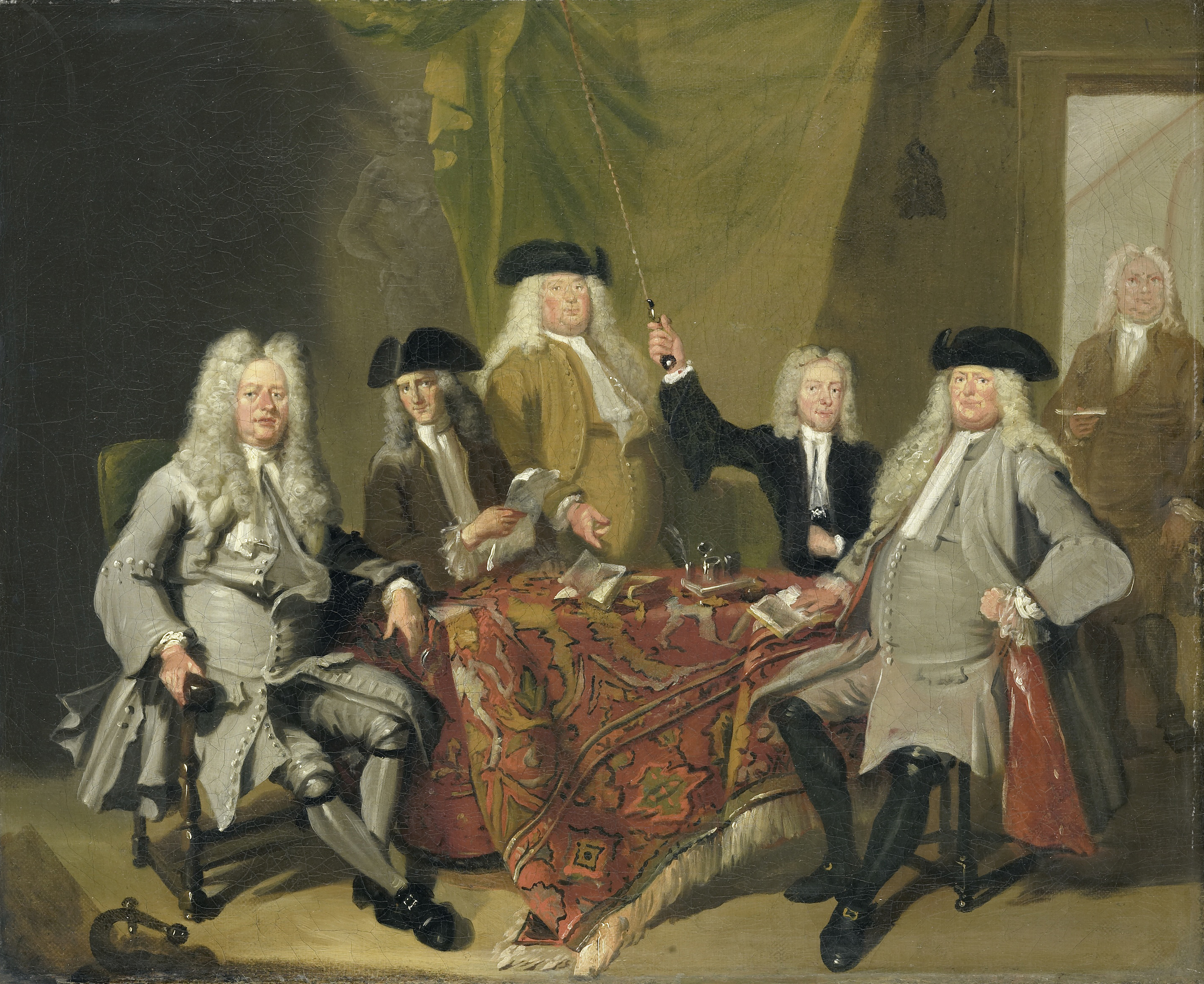
Inspectors of the Collegium Medicum - 1724 by Cornelis Troost (left to right) Hendrik van Bronkhorst, Jeronimo de Bosch, Daniël van Buren, Martinus Haesbaert, Caspar Commelin and Joost ter Pelkwijk

Caspar worked on books that were left uncompleted by the death of his uncle, Jan Commelin, and enjoyed the support of Nicolaes Witsen. Ruysch arranged for the city of Amsterdam to finance the publication. In 1703, he published a work on the systematics of rare exotic plants. In 1706, he was appointed as professor at the Athenaeum Illustre. Frederik Ruysch and Commelin divided the work, so that Ruysch dealt with the indigenous plants, and Commelijn the exotics. Jan Commelin, based his work on the taxonomic system devised by John Ray. Caspar was friends with the writer and artist Maria Sibylla Merian, and he wrote the botanical footnotes to her magnum opus, the Metamorphosis Insectorum Surinamensium, where he used his botanical knowledge to further describe and catalogue plants that were already known to Europeans. He also commissioned Merian's elder daughter Johanna to draw some of the artwork for his own books.

Commelin grew up in the neighbourhood of O.Z. Achterburgwal, and lived, after his first marriage, on the Singel and after the second on the Keizersgracht 510 near Leidsestraat. In 1724, Caspar Commelin, while an inspector at the Collegium Medicum, had his portrait painted by Cornelis Troost. The painting is to be seen at the Amsterdams Historisch Museum. On his death, he was succeeded by Johannes Burman.

== Works ==
- Flora Malabarica sive Horti Malabarici catalogus exhibens omnium eiusdem Plantarum nomina, quae è variis, tum veteribus tum recentioribus Botanicis collegit, & in ordinen Alphabeticum digessit (Leiden, 1696).
- Plantarum usualium horti medici Amstelodamensis Catalogus (Amsterdam, 1698)
- Praeludia Botanica ad Publicas Plantarum exoticarum demonstrationes, dicta in Horto Medico, cum demonstrationes exoticarum 3 Octobris 1701, & 29 Mai 1702 (Leiden, 1703). Digital edition by the University and State Library Düsseldorf
- Horti medici Amstelaedamensis Plantae Rariores et Exoticae Ad vivum aeri incisae (Leiden, 1706)
- Botano-Graphia a nominum barbarismis restituta, quam Florae-Malabaricae nomine celebrem, alphabetice ordinavit (Leiden, 1718)
- Caspari Commelini Horti Medici Amstelaedamensis plantarum usualium catalogus (Amsterdam, 1724)
