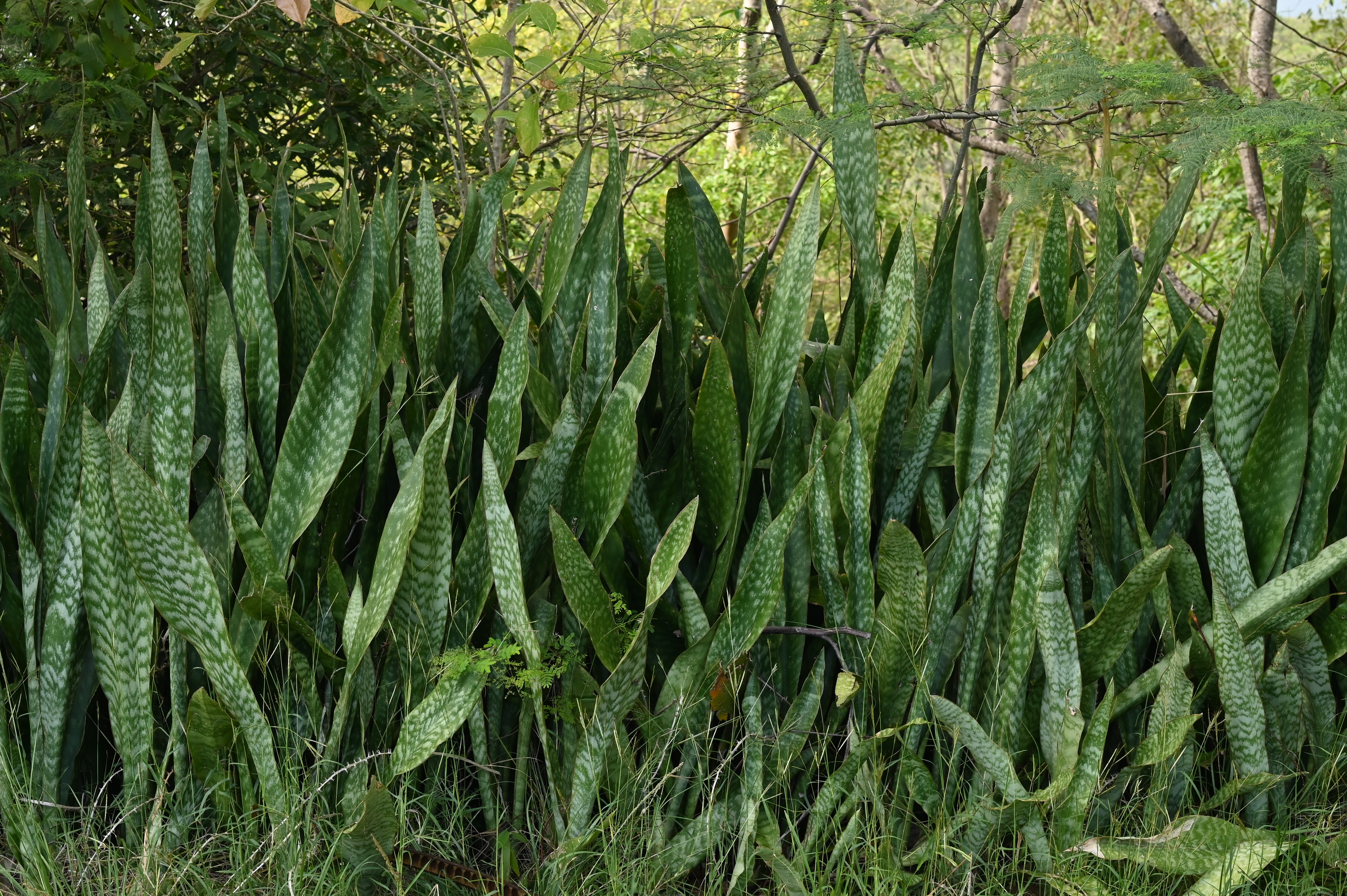
- In Guadeloupe
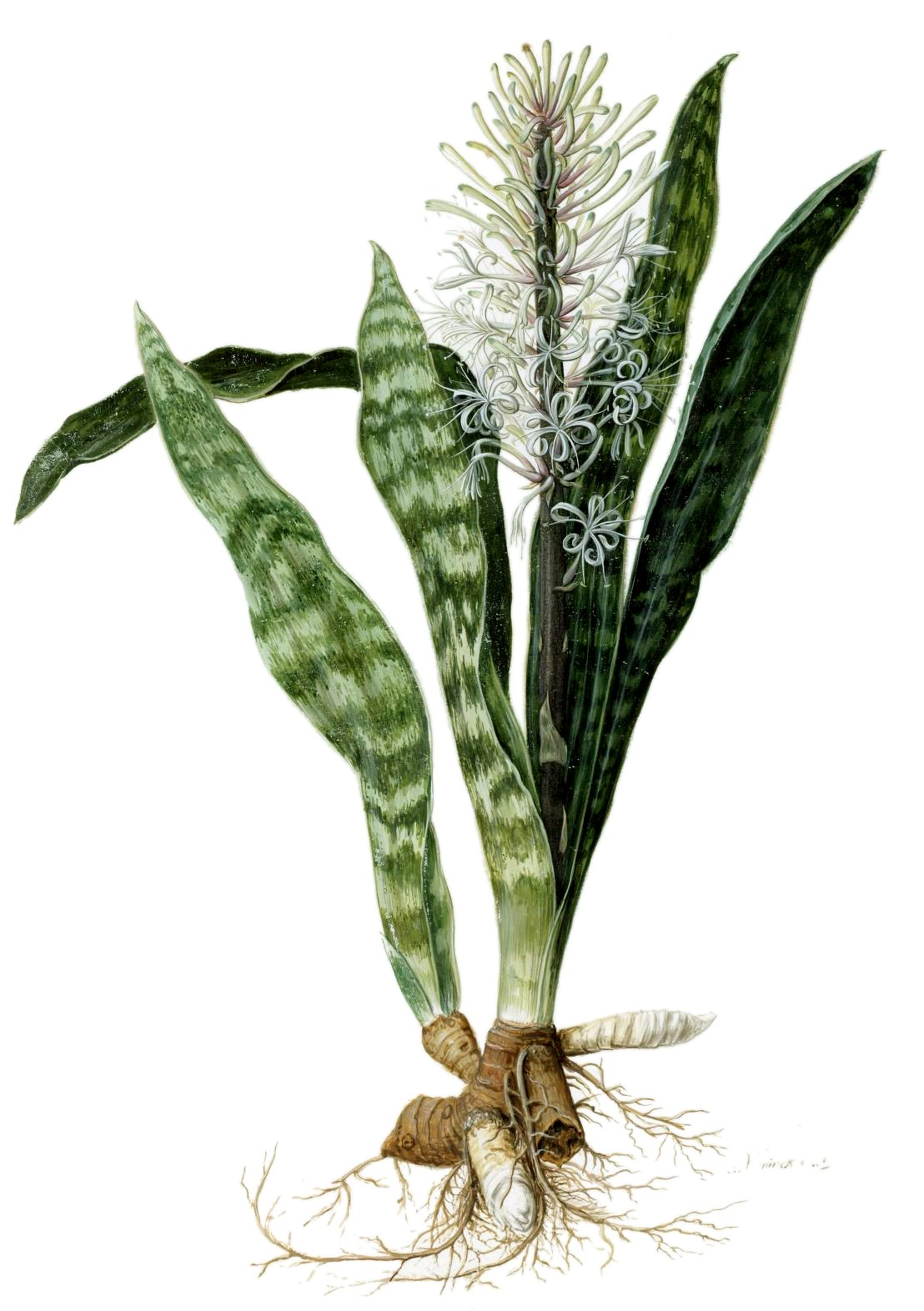
- Botanical illustration by Jan Moninckx

Scientific classification
- Kingdom: Plantae
- Clade: Tracheophytes
- Clade: Angiosperms
- Clade: Monocots
- Order: Asparagales
- Family: Asparagaceae
- Subfamily: Convallarioideae
- Genus: Dracaena
- Species: D. hyacinthoides

Binomial name
- Dracaena hyacinthoides (L.) Mabb.

Synonyms
- List: Acyntha guineensis (L.) Medik.; Acyntha thyrsiflora Kuntze; Aletris guineensis (L.) Jacq.; Aletris hyacinthoides (L.) L.; Aletris hyacinthoides var. guineensis (L.) L.; Aloe guineensis (L.) Jacq.; Aloe hyacinthoides L.; Aloe hyacinthoides var. guineensis L.; Cordyline guineensis (L.) Britton; Cordyline hyacinthoides (L.) W.Wight; Pleomele aloifolia Salisb.; Salmia guineensis (L.) Cav.; Salmia spicata Cav.; Sansevieria angustiflora Lindb.; Sansevieria angustifolia Baker; Sansevieria ceylonica Oken; Sansevieria fulvocincta Haw.; Sansevieria grandis Hook.f.; Sansevieria grandis var. zuluensis N.E.Br.; Sansevieria guineensis (L.) Willd.; Sansevieria hyacinthoides (L.) Druce; Sansevieria laetevirens Haw.; Sansevieria latifolia Bojer; Sansevieria polyphylla Haw.; Sansevieria rufocincta Baker; Sansevieria spicata (Cav.) Haw.; Sansevieria stenophylla Link; Sansevieria thyrsiflora Petagna; Veltheimia guineensis (L.) Neck.

= Dracaena hyacinthoides =

Species of plant

Dracaena hyacinthoides (many authorities continue to use its synonym Sansevieria hyacinthoides), called the African bowstring hemp, Somali hemp, Somali good luck plant, piles root, iguanatail, and mother-in-law's-tongue (a name it shares with Dracaena trifasciata), is a species of flowering plant in the family Asparagaceae. It is native to eastern Africa, from Kenya to South Africa, and it has been introduced to other locales, particularly Florida, the Caribbean, and Central America. An erect shrub reaching 0.9 m (3 ft), it is found in the seasonally dry tropics.

== Uses ==
Dracaena hyacinthoides is used as an ornamental in warm areas and as a houseplant, performing best in semi-shade. As some of its common names suggest, it is a minor fiber crop, and in its home range it is used as a treatment for hemorrhoids.

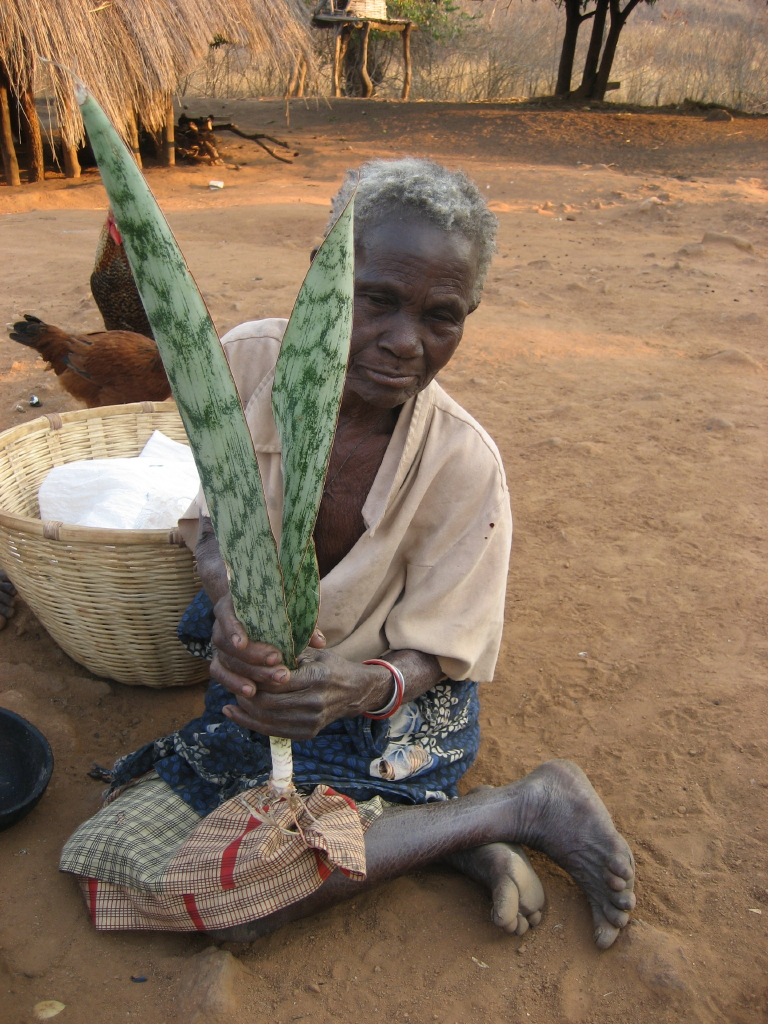
A woman in Mozambique preparing leaves for treating illness among her chickens
