= Jan Commelin =

Dutch botanist (1629-1692)

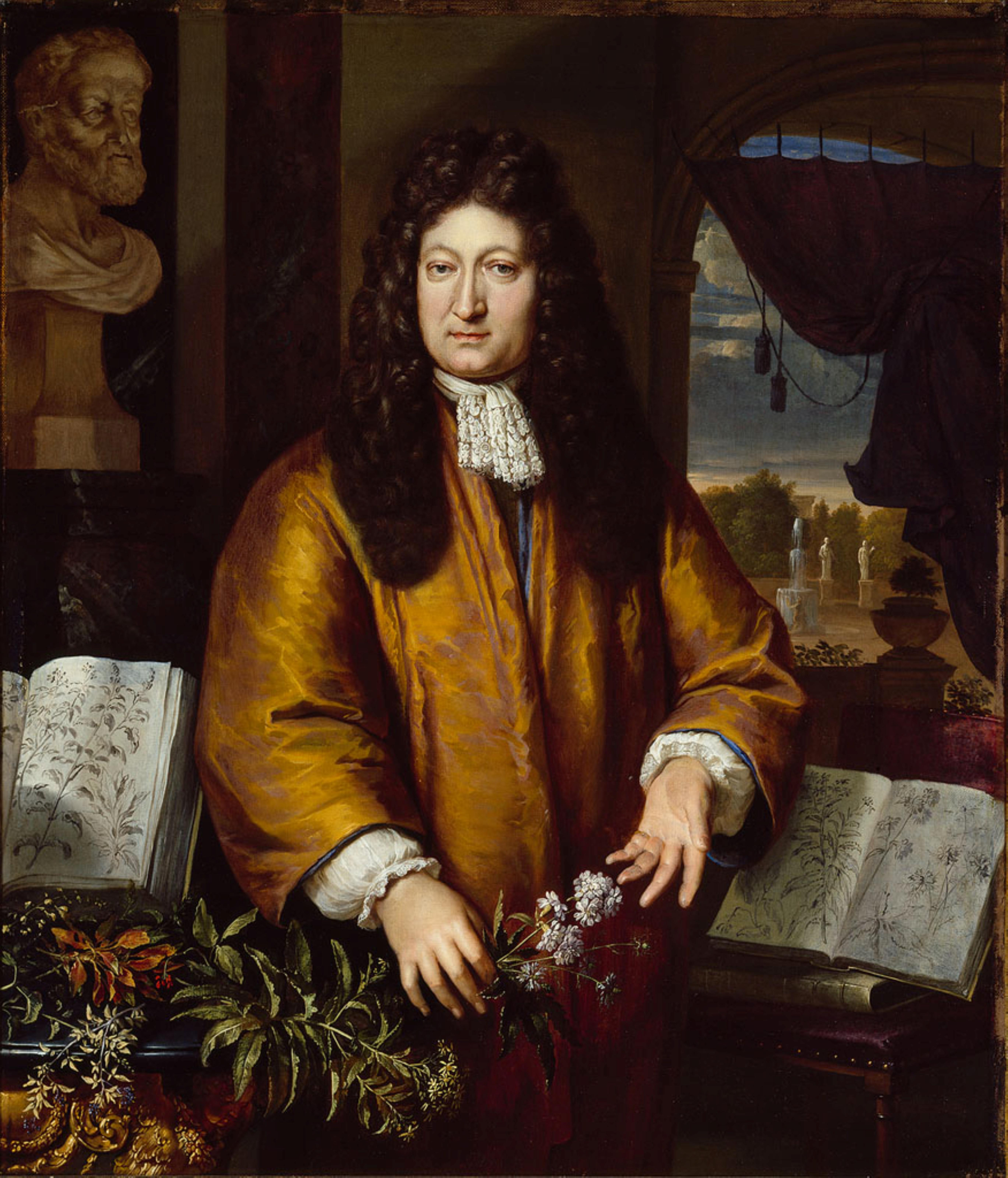
Jan Commelin by Gerard Hoet (1648-1733)

Jan Commelin (23 April 1629 – 19 January 1692), also known as Jan Commelijn, Johannes Commelin or Johannes Commelinus, was a botanist, and was the son of historian Isaac Commelin; his brother Casparus was a bookseller and newspaper publisher. Jan became a professor of botany when many plants were imported from the Cape and Ceylon and a new system had to be developed. As alderman of the city, together with burgomaster Johan Huydecoper van Maarsseveen he led the arrangement of the new botanic garden Hortus Medicus, later becoming Hortus Botanicus. He cultivated exotic plants on his farm 'Zuyderhout' near Haarlem. Commelin amassed a fortune by selling herbs and drugs to apothecaries and hospitals in Amsterdam and other Dutch cities.

Commelin did a great deal of the work in publishing Hortus malabaricus of Rheede, and Nederlandse Flora published in 1683 as well as contributing commentaries to the second and third volumes. He also prepared for publication "Horti Medici Amstelodamensis Rariorum" which appeared in 1697 and dealt mainly with plants from the East and West Indies, and was illustrated mainly by Jan Moninckx and his daughter Maria Moninckx.

His nephew Caspar Commelin (1667-1734) became the director of the Amsterdam botanic garden after Peter Hotton left. Caspar finished the work of his uncle and had it published with the help of Frederik Ruysch.

- In Maarssen there is a Commelinhof.
- The genus Commelina is named after him.

== Works ==
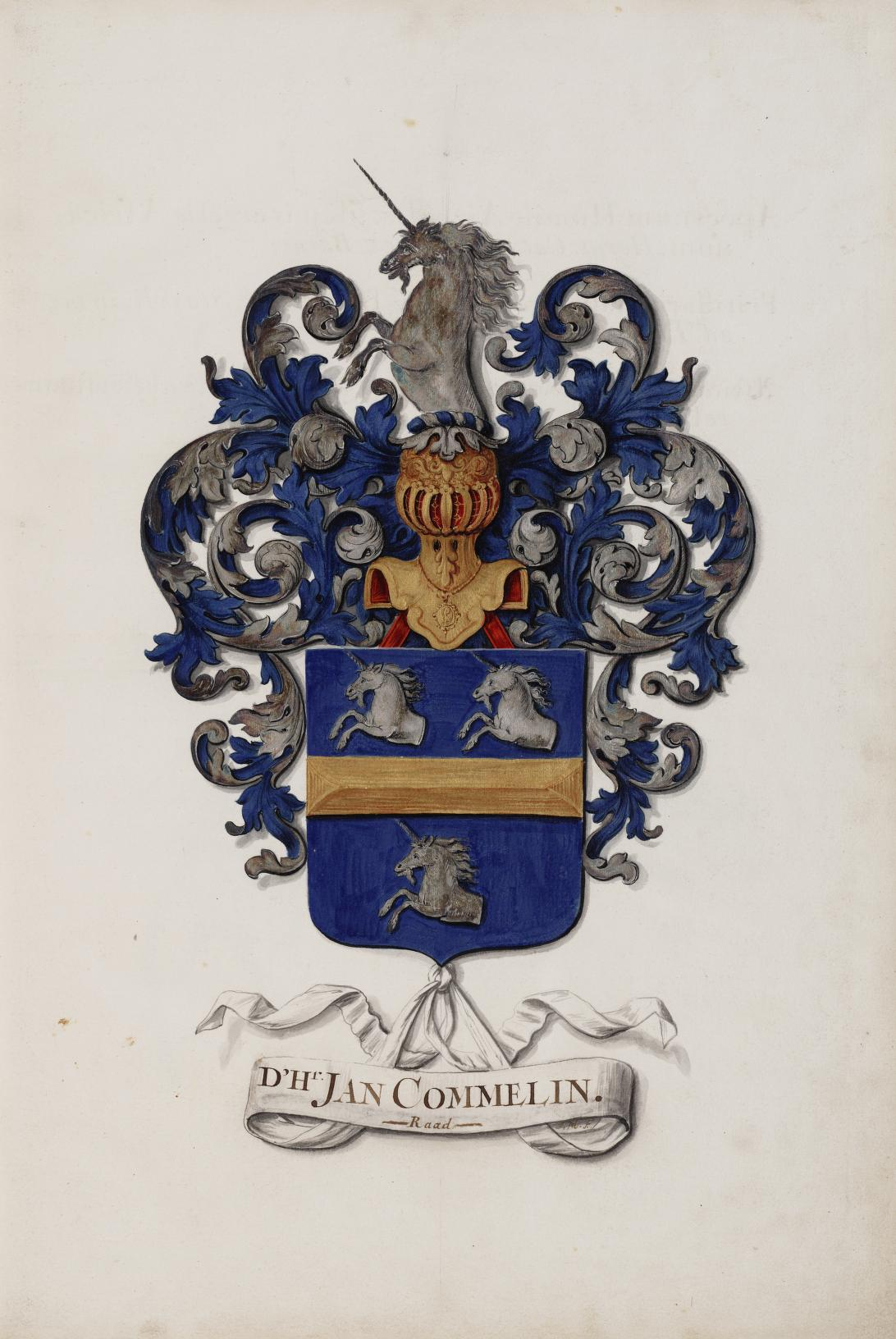
Heraldic arms of Jan Commelin by Jan Moninckx

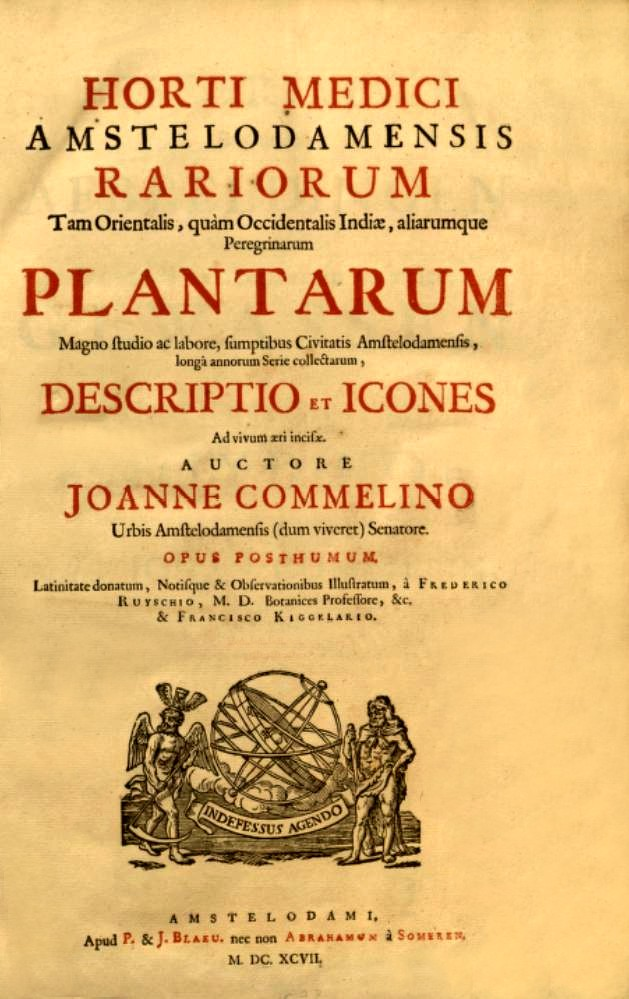
Title page

- Nederlantze Hesperides (1676)
- Catalogus plantarum indigenarum Hollandiae (1683)
- Horti medici Amstelodamensis rariorum... (1697-1701)

== Sources ==
- Wilfrid Blunt: The Art of Botanical Illustration: An Illustrated History. Dover Publications, 1994. ISBN 0-486-27265-6
- Gordon Douglas Rowley: A History of Succulent Plants. Strawberry Press, 1997.
- D.O. Wijnands (Herausgeber): The Botany of the Commelins. Rotterdam, 1983. ISBN 90-6191-262-8
