= Frederik Ruysch =

17/18th-century Dutch botanist and anatomist

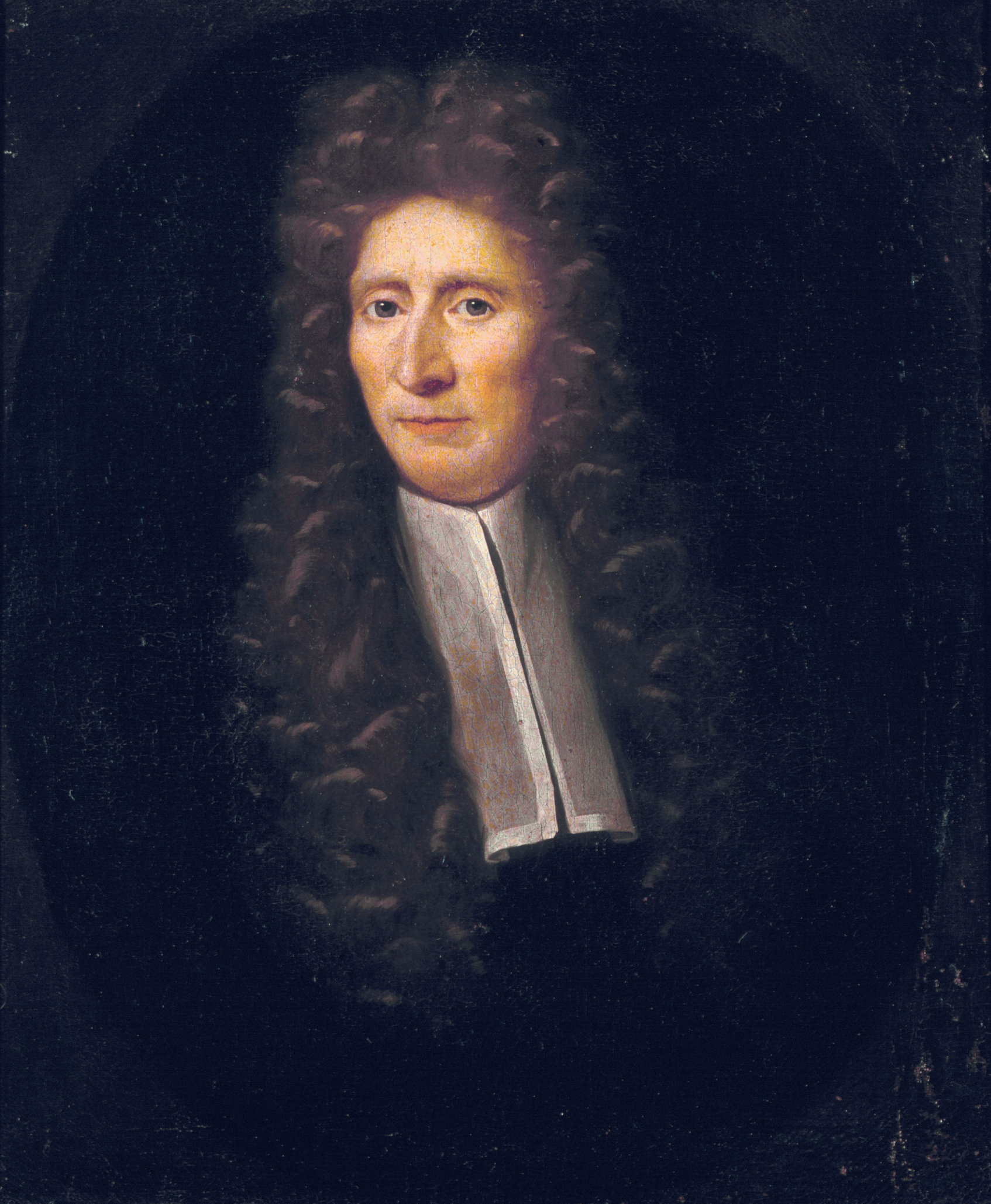
- Frederik Ruysch, by his son-in-law Juriaen Pool
- Born: March 28, 1638; The Hague
- Died: February 22, 1731 (aged 92); Amsterdam
- Education: University of Leiden
- Spouse: Maria Post (1643–1720)
- Children: Rachel Ruysch (*1664, painter); Anna Ruysch (*1666, painter)
- Scientific career
- Fields: botany, anatomy

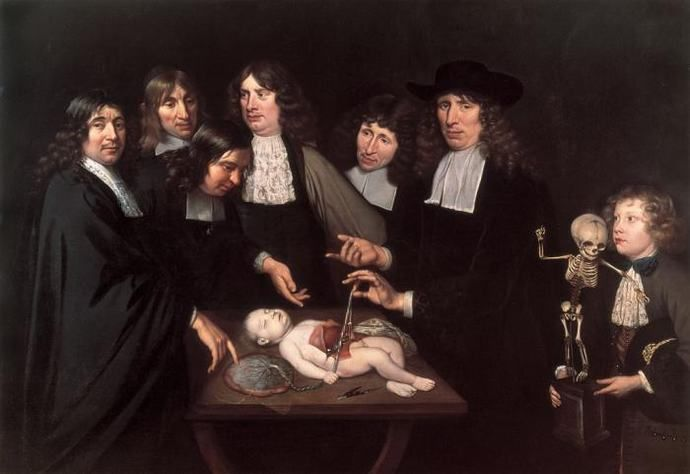
The Anatomy Lesson of Dr. Frederick Ruysch by Jan van Neck (1683). Amsterdam Museum.

Frederik Ruysch (Dutch: [ˈfreːdərɪk ˈrœys]; March 28, 1638 – February 22, 1731) was a Dutch botanist and anatomist. He is known for developing techniques for preserving anatomical specimens, which he used to create dioramas or scenes incorporating human parts. His anatomical preparations included over 2,000 anatomical, pathological, zoological, and botanical specimens, which were preserved by either drying or embalming. Ruysch is also known for his proof of valves in the lymphatic system, the vomeronasal organ in snakes, and arteria centralis oculi (the central artery of the eye). He was the first to describe the disease that is today known as Hirschsprung's disease, as well as several pathological conditions, including intracranial teratoma, enchondromatosis, and Majewski syndrome.

== Life ==
Frederik Ruysch was born in The Hague as the son of a government functionary and started as the pupil of a druggist. Fascinated by anatomy, he studied at the university of Leiden, under Franciscus Sylvius. His fellow students were Jan Swammerdam, Reinier de Graaf and Niels Stensen. The dissection of corpses was relatively expensive and cadavers were scarce, which led Ruysch to find alternative ways to prepare the organs. In 1661, he married Maria Post, daughter of the Dutch architect, Pieter Post. He graduated in 1664 with a thesis on pleuritis.

Ruysch became praelector of the Amsterdam surgeon's guild in 1667. In 1668, he was made the chief instructor to the city's midwives. They were no longer allowed to practice their profession until they had been examined by Ruysch. In 1679, he was appointed as a forensic advisor to the Amsterdam courts and in 1685 as a professor of botany in the Hortus Botanicus Amsterdam, where he worked with Jan and Caspar Commelin. Ruysch specialized in indigenous plants.

== Embalming technique ==
Ruysch researched many areas of human anatomy, and physiology, using spirits to preserve organs, and assembled one of Europe's most famous anatomical collections. His chief skill was the preparation and preservation of specimens in a secret liquor balsamicum, and he is believed to be one of the first to use arterial embalming to this effect. He developed an injection from mercuric sulfide, which originated from cinnabar, a naturally occurring red-colored mineral. The injection gave many specimens a reddish, almost lively expression. Thanks to this technique, observers could visualize and dissect even the smallest blood vessels, which was a groundbreaking technique in the 17th century. Ruysch's revolutionary embalming techniques also allowed for the corpses to be preserved for a greater period of time. This not only extended the time allowed for each dissection presentation but also made it possible for these presentations to take place during the warmer months.

== Ruysch's cabinet ==
Frederik Ruysch was both the founder and creator of a museum of anatomy, which was located within his own private residence. The museum was a popular tourist attraction for Amsterdam and was known throughout the educated world. It was a private collection, but Ruysch opened it to the public. An admission was charged, and a guide headed tours throughout the five rooms. The collection was separated into three different categories. Dry preparations included skeletons and dried organs, wet injection preparations included preservations in bottles with easily removable lids, and the last category was wet preparations in jugs with elaborate decorations. The last category could not be handled easily without risking damage to the preparation itself.

Unique to his collections were the inclusion of infant and fetal bodies, which composed approximately one-third of his entire collection. He purchased the majority of these specimens from midwives that worked under him, after the child died or when a pregnancy resulted in a miscarriage. His still lifes and displays that contained the bodies of infants, or parts thereof, were typically displayed with clothing, bonnets, or even glass eyes. By adding these elements, Ruysch was able to cover the marks and stitches from the embalming process and give his displays a more lifelike appearance. While some of his displays had abnormalities and defects, the main goal of his collections was to create works of art that he believed showed the perfection of the human body. In her early years, his daughter Rachel Ruysch, a painter of still lifes, had helped him to decorate the collection with flowers, fishes, seashells and the delicate body parts with lace.

By the time Ruysch was 24, his cabinet had become extremely popular and attracted the attention of many foreign dignitaries. In 1697, Peter the Great and Nicolaes Witsen visited Ruysch who had all the specimens exposed in five rooms, on two days during the week open for the public. He told Peter, who had a keen interest in science, how to catch butterflies and how to preserve them. They also had a common interest in lizards. Together they went to see patients. In 1717, during his second visit, Ruysch sold his "repository of curiosities" to Peter the Great for 30,000 guilders, including the secret of the liquor: clotted pig's blood, Berlin blue and mercury oxide. Ruysch refused to help when everything had to be packed and labelled. It took Albert Seba more than a month. The 100 colli were not sent immediately, but because of the Great Nordic War in the year after, divided over two ships. The collection was intact, and the rumours about the sailors that drunk the alcohol, are untrue.

Ruysch immediately began anew in his house on Bloemgracht, in the Jordaan. After his death this collection was sold to August the Strong. While some of his preserved collections remain, none of his scenes have survived. They are only known through a number of engravings, notably those by Cornelis Huyberts.

He was elected a Fellow of the Royal Society in 1715. He was painted by his son-in-law Jurriaen Pool. Frederik Ruysch published together with Herman Boerhaave.

In 1760 (30 years after his death), botanist Jacq. published Ruyschia, a genus of flowering plants from South America, belonging to the family Marcgraviaceae and named in Frederik Ruysch's honor.

== Works ==
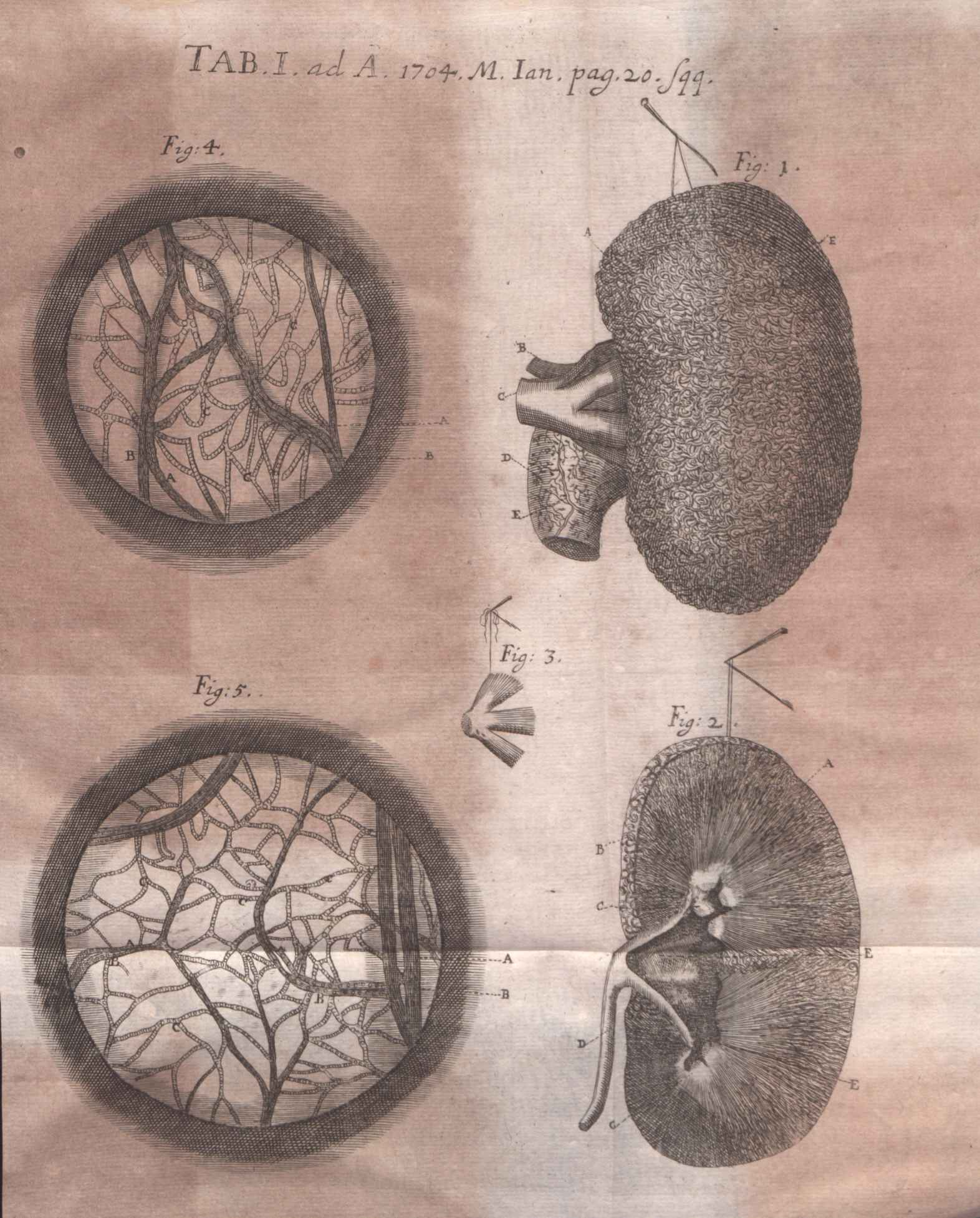
Illustration of critique of Thesaurus anatomicus... published in Acta Eruditorum, 1704

- Disputatio medica inauguralis de pleuritide. Dissertation, Leiden, 1664.
- Dilucidatio valvularum in vasis lymphaticis et lacteis. Hagae-Comitiae, ex officina H. Gael, 1665; Leiden, 1667; Amsterdam, 1720. 2. Aufl. 1742.
- Museum anatomicum Ruyschianum, sive catalogus rariorum quae in Authoris aedibus asservantur. Amsterdam, 1691. 2. Aufl. 1721; 3. Aufl. 1737.
- Catalogus Musaei Ruyschiani. Praeparatorum Anatomicorum, variorum Animalium, Plantarum, aliarumque Rerum Naturalium. Amsterdam: Janssonio-Waesbergios, 1731.
- Observationum anatomico-chirurgicarum centuria. Amsterdam 1691; 2. Aufl. 1721: 3. Aufl. 1737.
- Epistolae anatomicae problematicae. 14 Bände. Amsterdam, 1696–1701.
- Het eerste Anatomisch Cabinet. Amsterdam, Johan Wolters, 1701
- Thesaurus anatomicus. 10 Delen. Amsterdam, Johan Wolters, 1701–1716.
- Adversarium anatomico-medico-chirurgicorum decas prima. Amsterdam 1717.
- Curae posteriores seu thesaurus anatomicus omnium precedentium maximus. Amsterdam, 1724.
- Thesaurus animalium primus. Amsterdam, 1728. 18: Amsterdam, 1710, 1725.
- Curae renovatae seu thesaurus anatomicus post curas posteriores novus. Amsterdam, 1728.
- Samen met Herman Boerhaave: Opusculum anatomicum de fabrica glandularum in corpore humano. Leiden, 1722; Amsterdam, 1733.
- Tractatio anatomica de musculo in fundo uteri. Amsterdam, 1723.
- Opera omnia. 4 Bände. Amsterdam, 1721.
- Opera omnia anatomico-medico-chirurgica huc usque edita. 5 Bände. Amsterdam, 1737.
- Herbarivm Rvyschianvm, in Mvsei Imperialis Petropolitani, vol. 1, pars secvnda. Petropolitanae, 1745.

== Modern Day ==
Ruysch's collection can be seen at Peter the Great Museum of Anthropology and Ethnography in Saint Petersburg. The collection contains more than 900 species from Ruysch's original collection.
