= Joan Huydecoper II =

Dutch mayor (1625–1704)

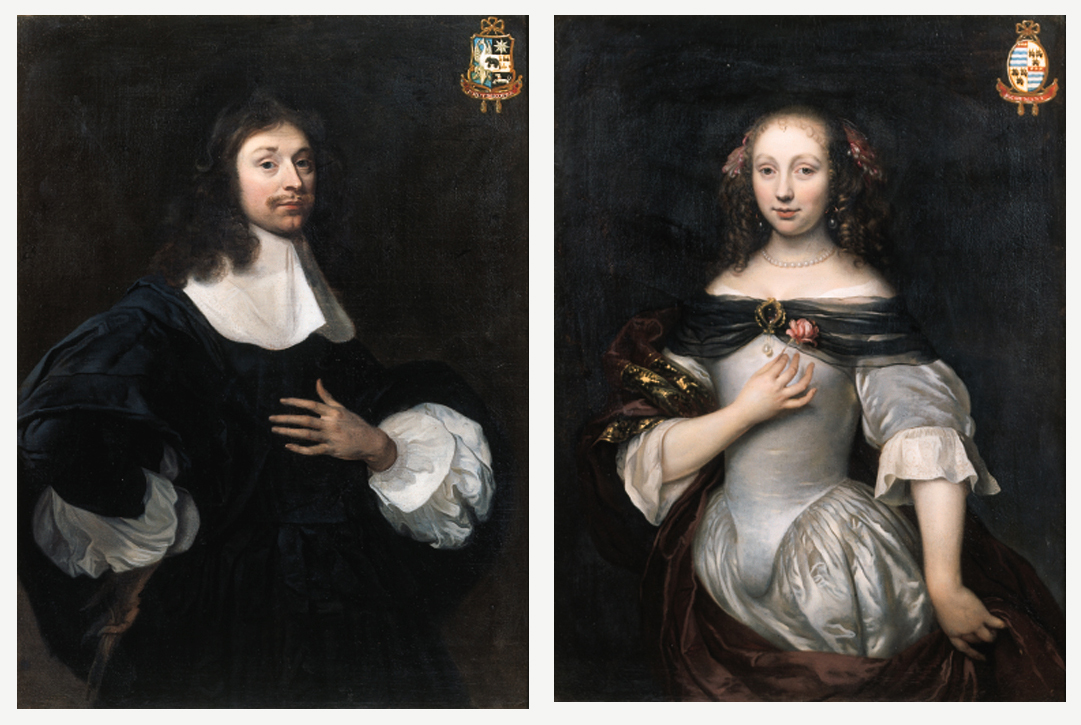
Portrait of Joan Huydecoper and his wife Sophia Huydecoper née Coymans (1636–1714), attributed to Jacob van Loo.

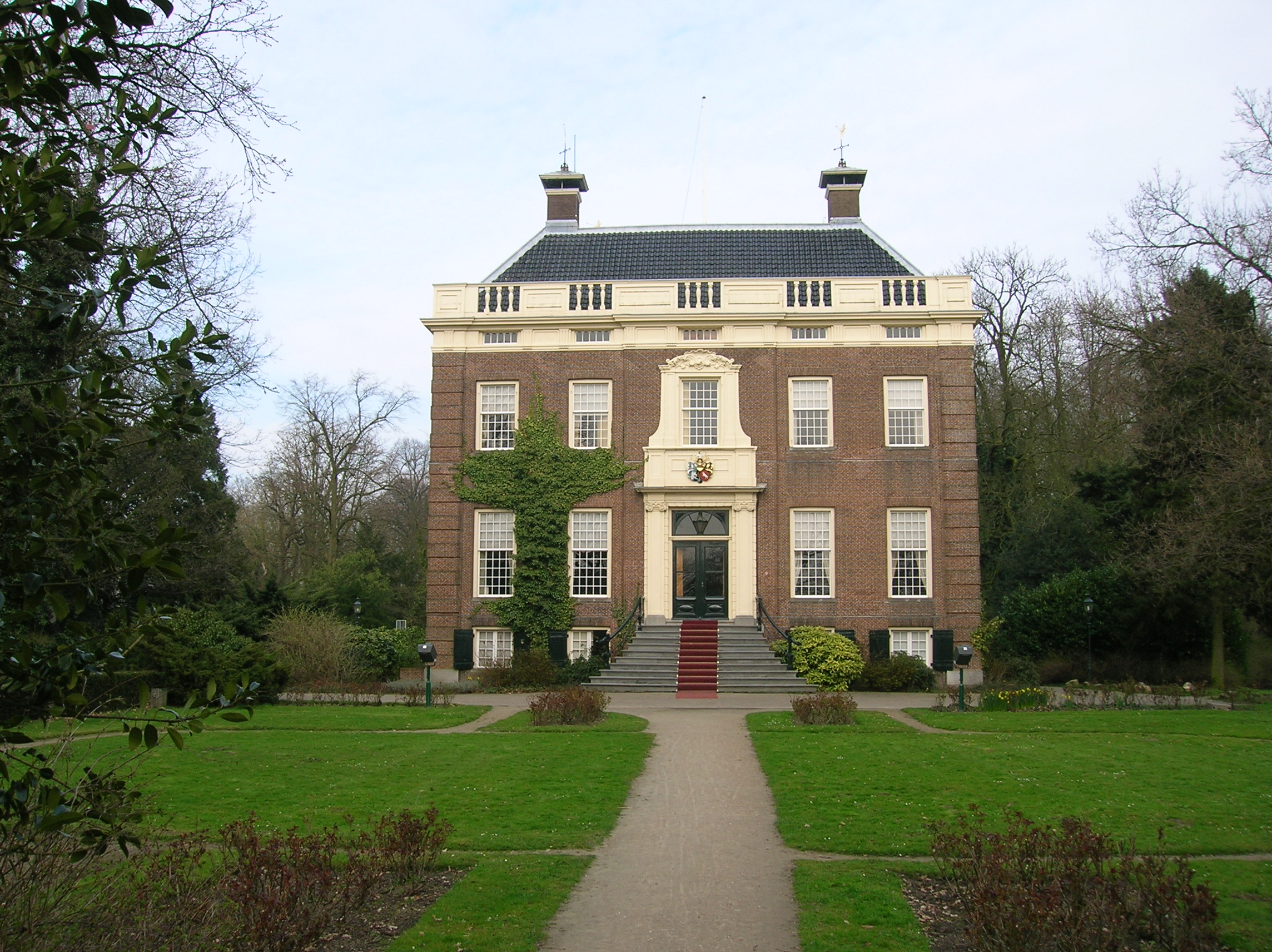
The mansion Goudestein in Maarssen, owned by the family Huydecoper

Joan Huydecoper van Maarsseveen II (21 February 1625, Amsterdam – 1 December 1704, Amsterdam) was the eldest son of burgomaster Joan Huydecoper van Maarsseveen I and the brother-in-law of the collector Jan J. Hinlopen and the sheriff Jacob Boreel. He was mayor of Amsterdam for 13 terms between 1673 and 1693. Unlike most mayors, he did not live at the Golden Bend, but on Lauriergracht in the Jordaan, where Govaert Flinck, Johannes Lingelbach, Jurriaen Ovens, who painted his portrait, the art-dealer Gerrit van Uylenburgh, and Melchior de Hondecoeter also lived.

== Life ==
When Huydecoper left on the Grand Tour in 1648 his father wanted to keep a firm grip on his 23-year-old son. He required him to be more studious, more thrifty and demanded a complete list of names of the people with whom he associated. His father encouraged him to be thrifty and cut back on expenses. In 1655 he went with his father and Pieter de Graeff on a diplomatic mission to the prince-elector Frederick William of Brandenburg. Back home Johan married his first cousin, Sophia Coymans, which tied another knot to that wealthy banker family. In 1659 he refused to ever visit his mother-in-law again for dinner on Sundays. In 1660 he was invited twice by the Princess Royale for dinner; in September he went to Scheveningen to see her leaving. In 1660 Amalia of Solms-Braunfels and her daughters paid him a visit.

For years Huydecoper kept a diary, writing about his life, mentioning smoking his pipe, visiting his favourite tavern, the visitors and the many presents, the upbringing of the children, but also intimate details of his prurience, the quarrels, and clashes with the family and in-laws.

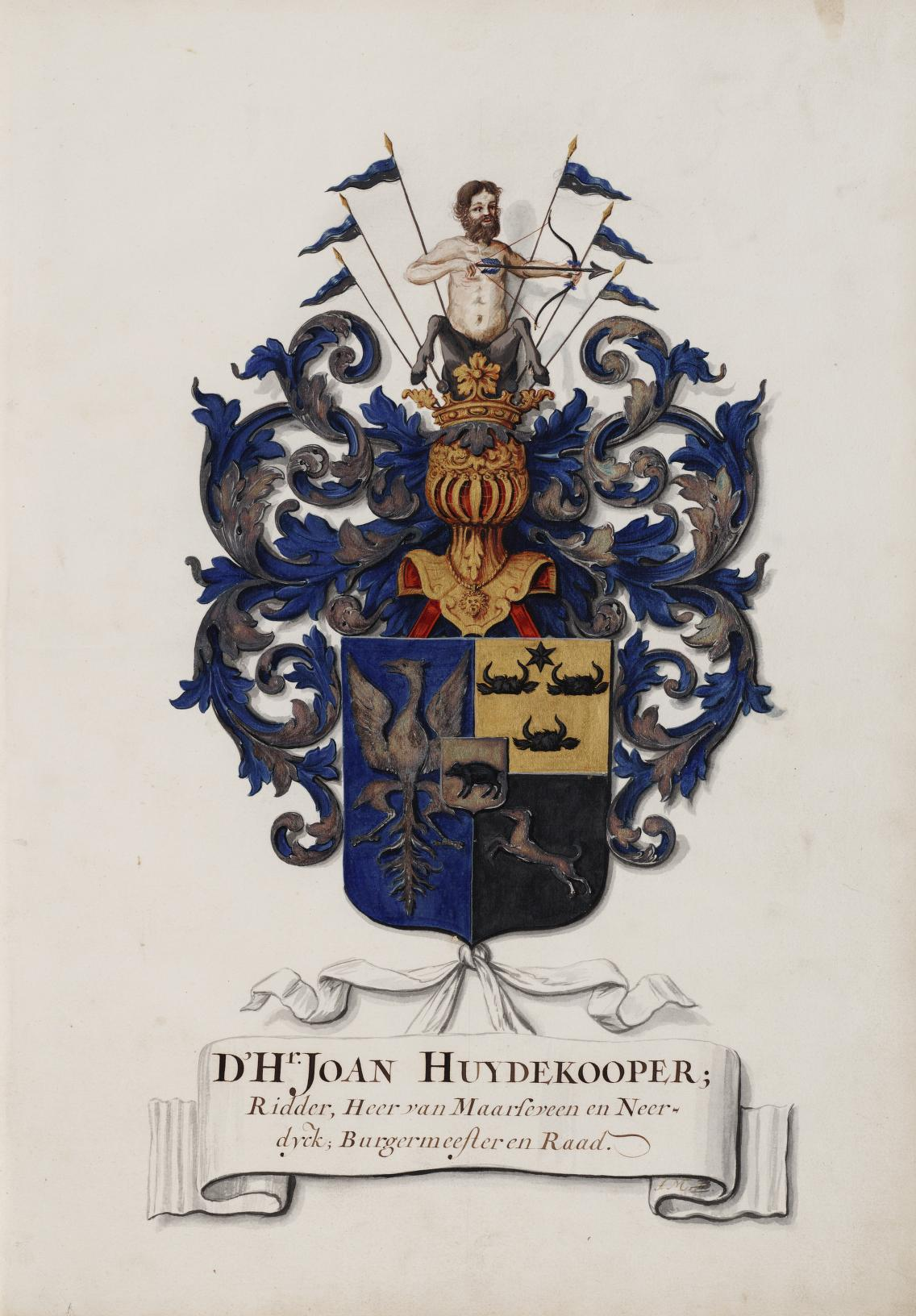
Heraldic arms of Joan Huydecoper by Jan Moninckx

In 1666, he became an administrator of the Dutch East India Company. During the Year of Disaster in 1672, he was appointed as cashier at the Wisselbank and when the office of stadholder was reinstated by the 21-year-old William III of Orange, Johan Huydecoper had the political tides on his side. He was aligned by marriage with the politically influential Gillis Valckenier, who jumped on the Orangist bandwagon in the summer of 1672. Huydecoper had himself painted by Jurriaen Ovens; Jan van der Heyden painted several times his estate and the village. Already in 1675 he had an argument with the stadholder. In December 1676 he skated from Maarssen to Baambrugge and back. He did visit Antonie van Leeuwenhoek in Delft, and looked through his microscope at tiny creatures. Jacob Boreel, his brother-in-law and the ambassador in Paris, was visited by two of his children.

Being an amateur botanist himself, he kept melons at his country house in Maarssen along the river Vecht. He received many plants, animals and birds from Cape of Good Hope, Mauritius, Madagascar, Ceylon, Ternate and Java, e.g. parakeets, parrots, flying lizards and chameleons. Some of the paintings obtained from his brother-in-law Jan J. Hinlopen were presented to various members of the VOC. One of these, an unfinished painting by Simon de Vlieger of a brawny fisherman was given to Simon van der Stel, last commander and first governor of the Cape of Good Hope in South Africa as a memento (herinnering). In 1681 he became a councillor in the Admiralty of Amsterdam. In 1682 Joan Huydecoper and Jan Commelin took the initiative in establishing a new Hortus Medicus in Amsterdam. It differed from the herb garden at the Binnengasthuis insofar as it also grew ornamental plants and would function as a Hortus Botanicus. In 1689, the year after the Invitation to William Huydecoper refused to send recommendations for new appointments in the vroedschap to the stadholder and in the meantime King of England. In 1690 he, Nicolaes Witsen and his brother-in-law Jacob Boreel were involved in a case with Romeyn de Hooghe, accused of espionage, incest, sodomy, and selling pornographic engravings. In 1693 he was appointed as one of the directors, and casher of the Wisselbank.

On 16 January 1698 he and his nephew Jacob J. Hinlopen spent one evening with Peter the Great, who was about 2.03 m tall. The czar was about to leave for England. When two huge glasses were filled, Huydecoper decided to leave but was caught and brought back to the table. Huydecoper feared for his life, sitting between the czar and Franz Lefort.
