= Jan Moninckx =

Dutch painter (1655–1714)

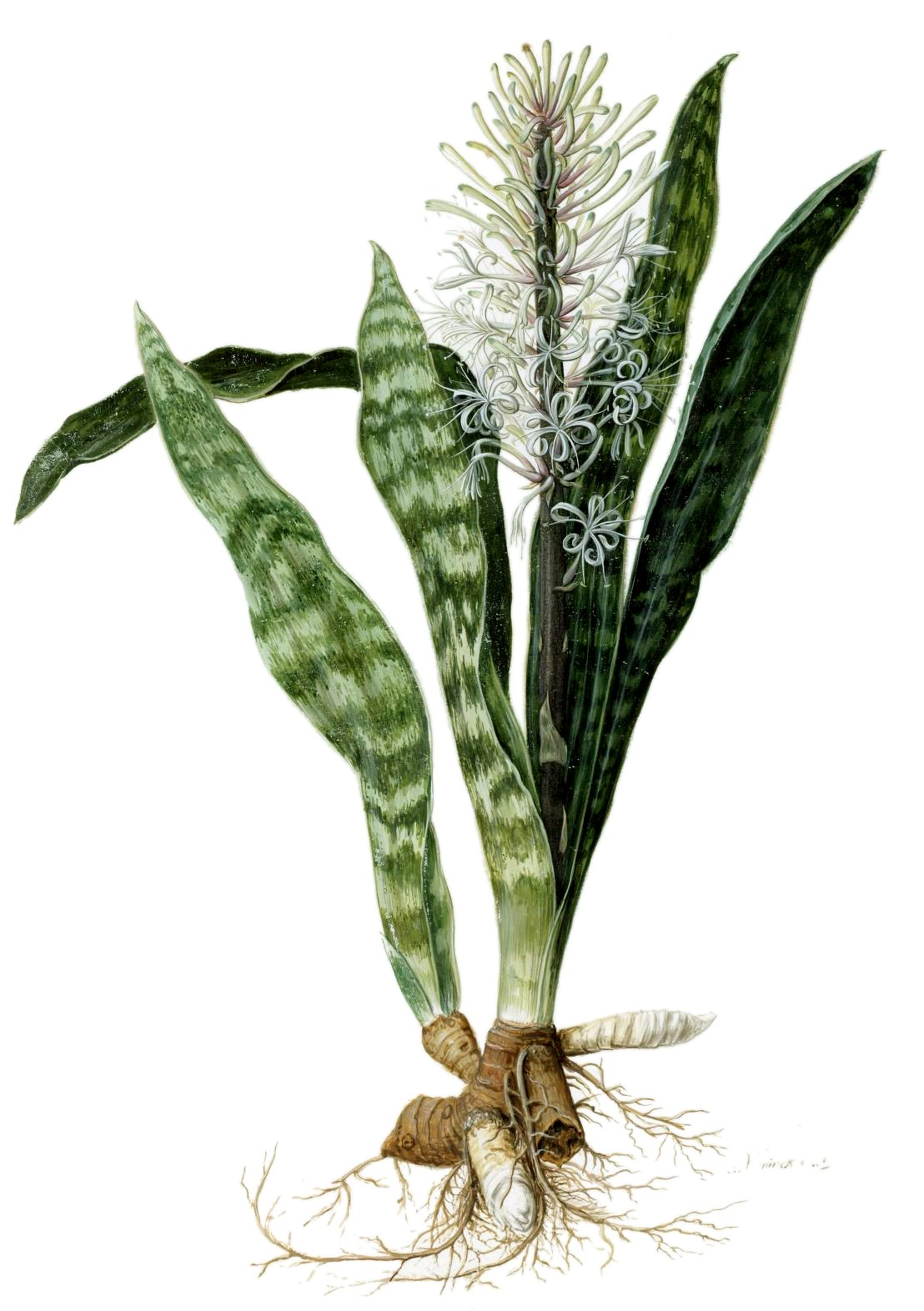
Sansevieria hyacinthoides (L.) Druce

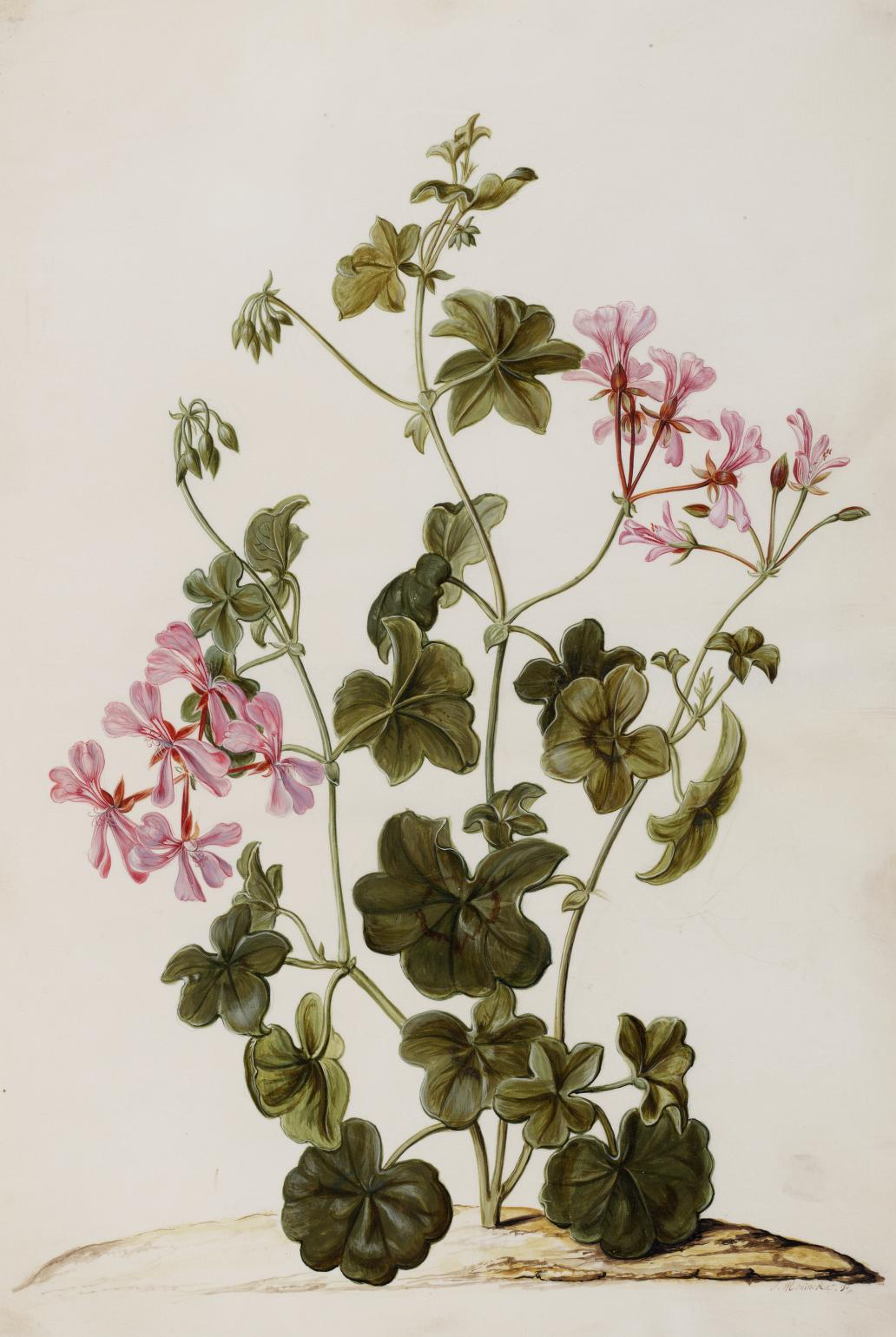
Pelargonium peltatum L.

Jan Moninckx (c1656 Leende - buried 20 May 1714 Amsterdam), was a Dutch botanical artist and painter, best known for the colour plates he and his relative, Maria Moninckx, created and which make up the nine-volume Moninckx Atlas. This was published in the period 1686-1709 and depicted 420 plants from the Hortus Medicus of Amsterdam.

== Hortus Medicus ==
In 1682 Joan Huydecoper and Jan Commelin took the initiative in establishing a new Hortus Medicus in Amsterdam. It differed from the herb garden at the Binnengasthuis insofar as it also grew ornamental plants and would function as a Hortus Botanicus. Huydecoper was mayor of Amsterdam and had great influence with the Dutch East India Company, while Commelin was a merchant in herbs and pharmaceuticals. Both men were well known as enthusiastic and knowledgeable gardeners. Because of their contacts in the businessworld and their practical horticultural experience, they received a constant stream of plants, seeds, bulbs and cuttings to be cultivated far from their place of origin.

This led to the creation of one of the richest plant collections in Europe. Plants of commercial value, also potherbs, edible crop plants and medicinal plants, were propagated in the garden for planting elsewhere. An example of this was the coffee plant, which oddly, was not illustrated in the Moninckx Atlas, but became the backbone of the Brazilian coffee industry. In addition many ornamental plants, especially strange and exotic specimens, were cultivated. These plants were grown for their interest, curiosity value and often for further research.

== Moninckx Atlas ==
Between 1686 and 1709, Huydecoper and Commelin commissioned 420 large watercolours on vellum of plants growing in the Amsterdam garden. The garden did not have a herbarium, and a pictorial record in the form of paintings, would create something of permanent value.

Four very accomplished artists were employed to tackle this extensive project. The lion's share of work was done by Jan Moninckx: 273 sheets bear his signature. Maria Moninckx, a family member, produced 101 paintings. The other artists were Alida Withoos (13 aquarels) and Johanna Helena Herolt-Graff (daughter of Maria Sibylla Merian) with 2 sheets; 31 paintings were unsigned. The heraldic arms of Huydecoper and Commelin, painted by Jan Moninckx, were used to decorate volume 1 of the Atlas. In 1749 there was an attempt to expand the collection. This 9th volume consisted of a mere five paintings, one by Dorothea Storm-Kreps and four by Jan Matthias Cock. The illustrated plants in the first five volumes and part of the sixth, had their names printed in both Latin and Dutch. The Latin names in bold Roman type, and the Dutch names in elegant Gothic calligraphy.

This monumental work is still of great taxonomic, historic, and artistic interest. The watercolours have served as the basis for engravings in the Horti Medici Amstelodamensis rariorum plantarum historia, part 1, by Jan Commelin, appearing in 1697 and part 2, by his cousin Caspar Commelin, in 1701. The famous botanist Carl Linnaeus based the taxonomy for his Species plantarum of 1753 on no fewer than 259 species from the Moninckx Atlas. A recent scanning of the complete work has made the plates and text available on the University of Amsterdam website.

== Moninckx family ==
The Moninckx family had a long tradition of painting and were researched in a book titled De Schildersfamilie Moninckx, published by Abraham Bredius in 1889. Well-known was Gijsbert Moninckx, a member of the Guild of Saint Luke in The Hague in 1605.

Jan's parents were Johannes Moninckx, a clergyman at Leende, North Brabant, and his wife, Maria Jan van Duysel. On 23 May 1682 Jan signed a betrothal register in Amsterdam, stating his intention to marry Anna Geestevelt. Anna was 23 years old and both lived at Het Singel in Amsterdam. In 1686 Jan was lieutenant in a military guard.

In 1698 Jan signed a notarial document authorising the sale of a house at Voorburg that had belonged to his deceased father-in-law. At that time he lived in Leydsedwarsstraat in Amsterdam and was married to Adriaentje Uchtenbroeck, whose father had been Pieter Jans Uchtenbroeck. Jan was buried on 20 May 1714 and had died at his house in Noorderdwarsstraat near the Prinsengracht. Adriaentje was buried on 27 January 1722.

== See also ==
- List of florilegia and botanical codices
