= Hortus Botanicus (Amsterdam) =

Dutch botanical garden

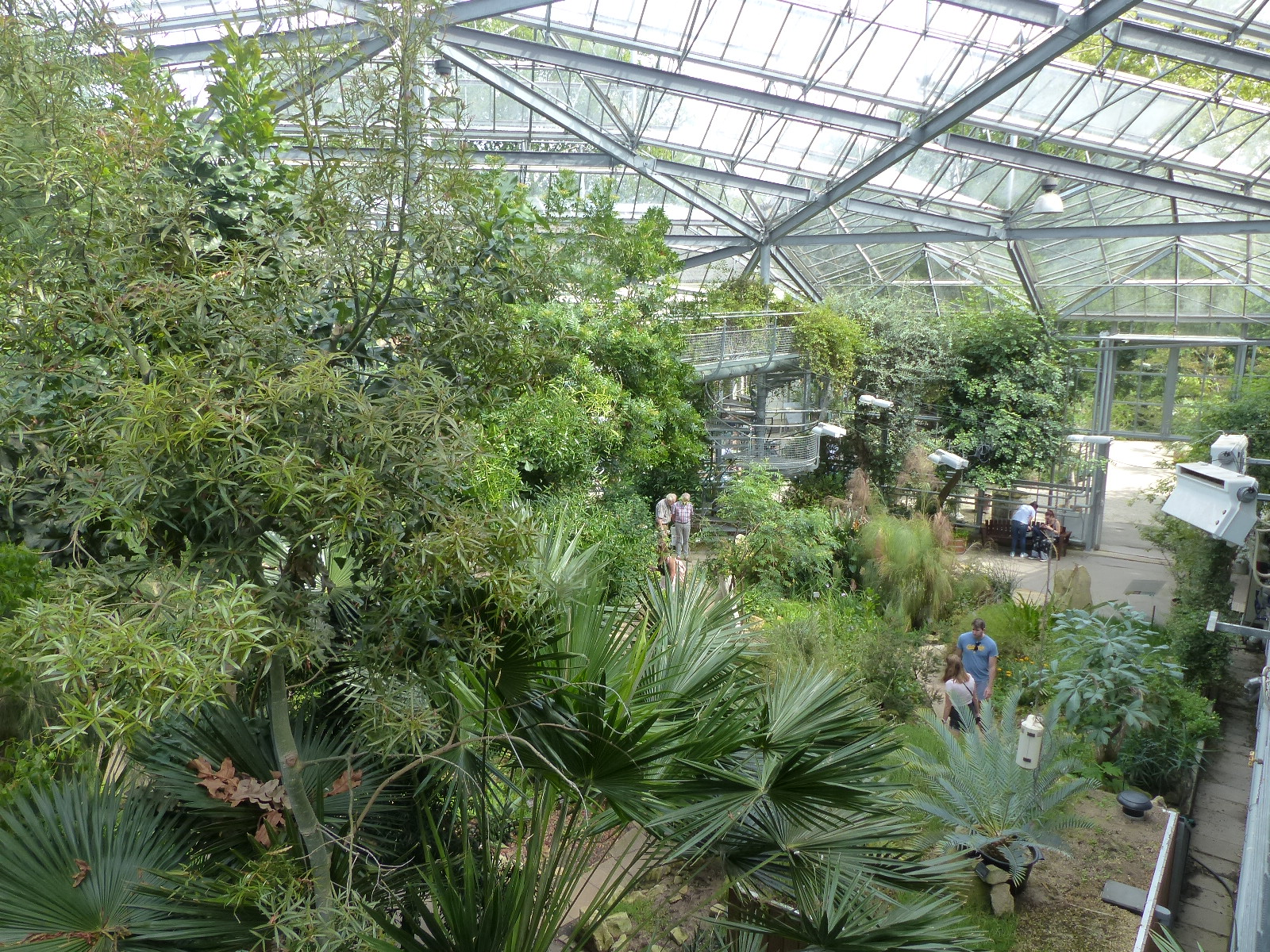
- The greenhouse in 2019

- Location within the city center of Amsterdam
- Established: 1638
- Location: Plantage Middenlaan L2; Amsterdam, Netherlands
- Coordinates: 52.3668°N 4.9079°E
- Type: botanic garden
- Visitors: 244.863 (2019)
- Director: Carlien Blok
- Website: www.dehortus.nl

Hortus Botanicus is a botanical garden in the Plantage district of Amsterdam, the Netherlands. It is one of the world's oldest botanical gardens.

== History ==
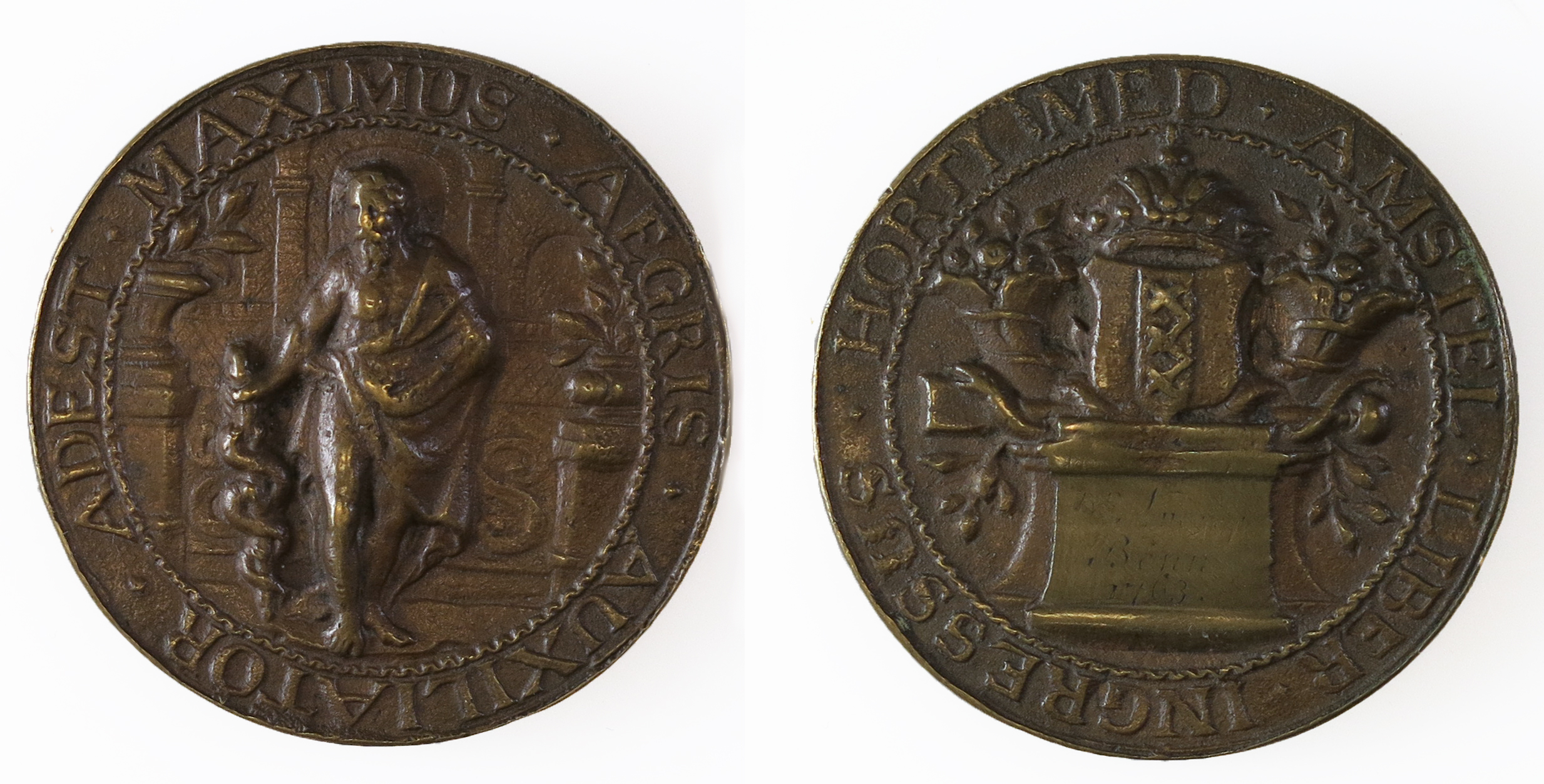
One of the tokens medics had to use to gain access to the garden in the eighteenth century.

Amsterdam City Council founded the Hortus Botanicus (initially named the Hortus Medicus) in 1638 to serve as a herbal garden for doctors and apothecaries, as botanical extracts were the primary treatment for illnesses during this time period. Physicians and pharmacists received their training and took exams there.

The garden's initial collection was amassed during the 17th century through plants and seeds brought back by traders from the Dutch East India Company for use as medicines and potential commercial possibilities. A single coffee plant in Hortus' collection served as the parent for the entire coffee culture in Central and South America.

Likewise, two small potted oil palms that were brought back from Mauritius had produced seeds which were propagated throughout all of Southeast Asia, becoming a major source of revenue in the Dutch East Indies and present-day Indonesia.

In 1646, Johannes Snippendaal was appointed director of the garden. During his tenure, he determined that the collection comprised 796 plant species, most of which were medicinal plants. Many of these plants are still grown at the Hortus Botanicus in its Snippendaal Garden, which is commonly referred to as 'the 17th century pharmacopoeia of Amsterdam’.

The hexagonal pavilion dates back to the late 1600s. The entrance gate was built in the early 1700s. The Orangery dates from 1875, and the Palm House and Hugo de Vries Laboratory - both created in Amsterdam School expressionist architecture - date from 1912 and 1915.

Hugo de Vries became the director of the Hortus Botanicus between 1885 and 1918, bringing international attention to the garden. The garden's governing board directed the construction of the Palm House and laboratory in order to keep the professor there.

In 1987, the garden almost went bankrupt when the University of Amsterdam suddenly stopped paying its expenses, but a community of individual supporters prevented its closure. The Hortus Botanicus is now supported by the Amsterdam City Council.

== Attractions ==
Hortus Botanicus is a popular attraction for both Dutch and international visitors. The collection is famous for its trees and plants, some of which are endangered. Well-known plants and trees can be found there, like the Persian ironwood tree.

Recent additions to Hortus include a large hothouse, which incorporates three different tropical climates. There are also two halls in the garden, which are used for conferences and ceremonies, and a café.

== Gallery ==
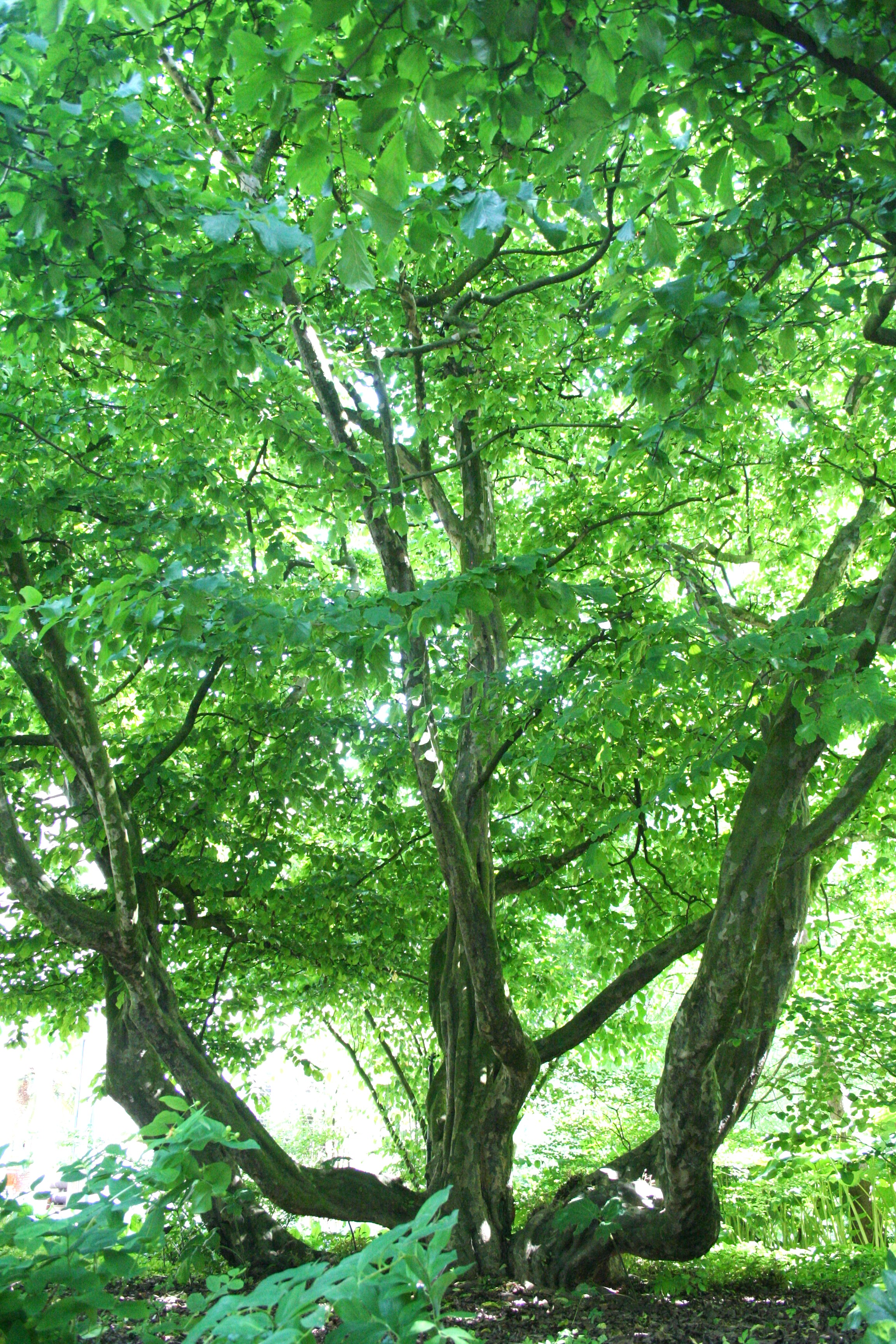
Persian ironwood tree (Parrotia persica) at the Hortus Botanicus

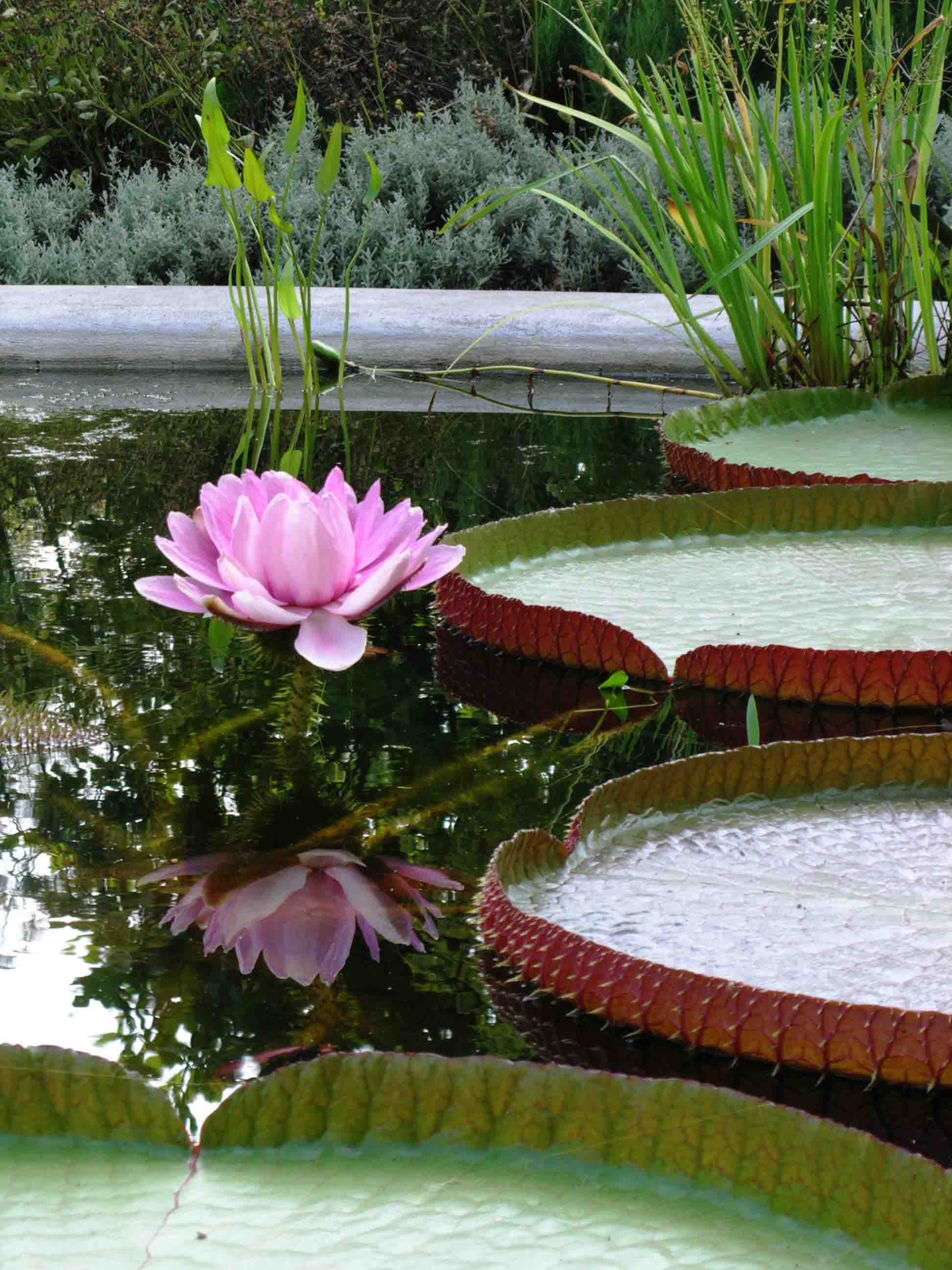
A flowering Victoria in the Hortus Botanicus

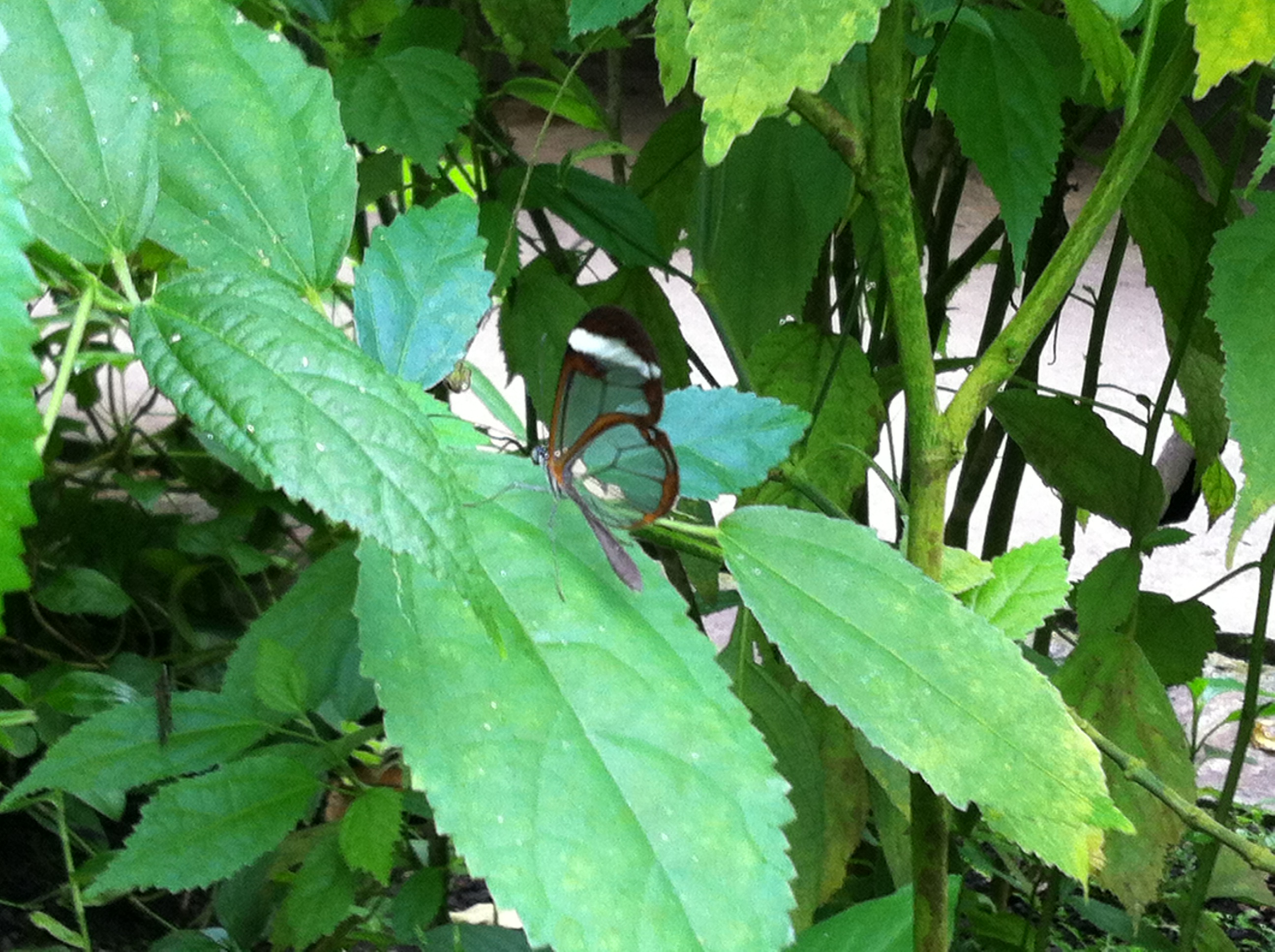
A rare kind of transparent butterfly inside a greenhouse at the Hortus Botanicus (Amsterdam)

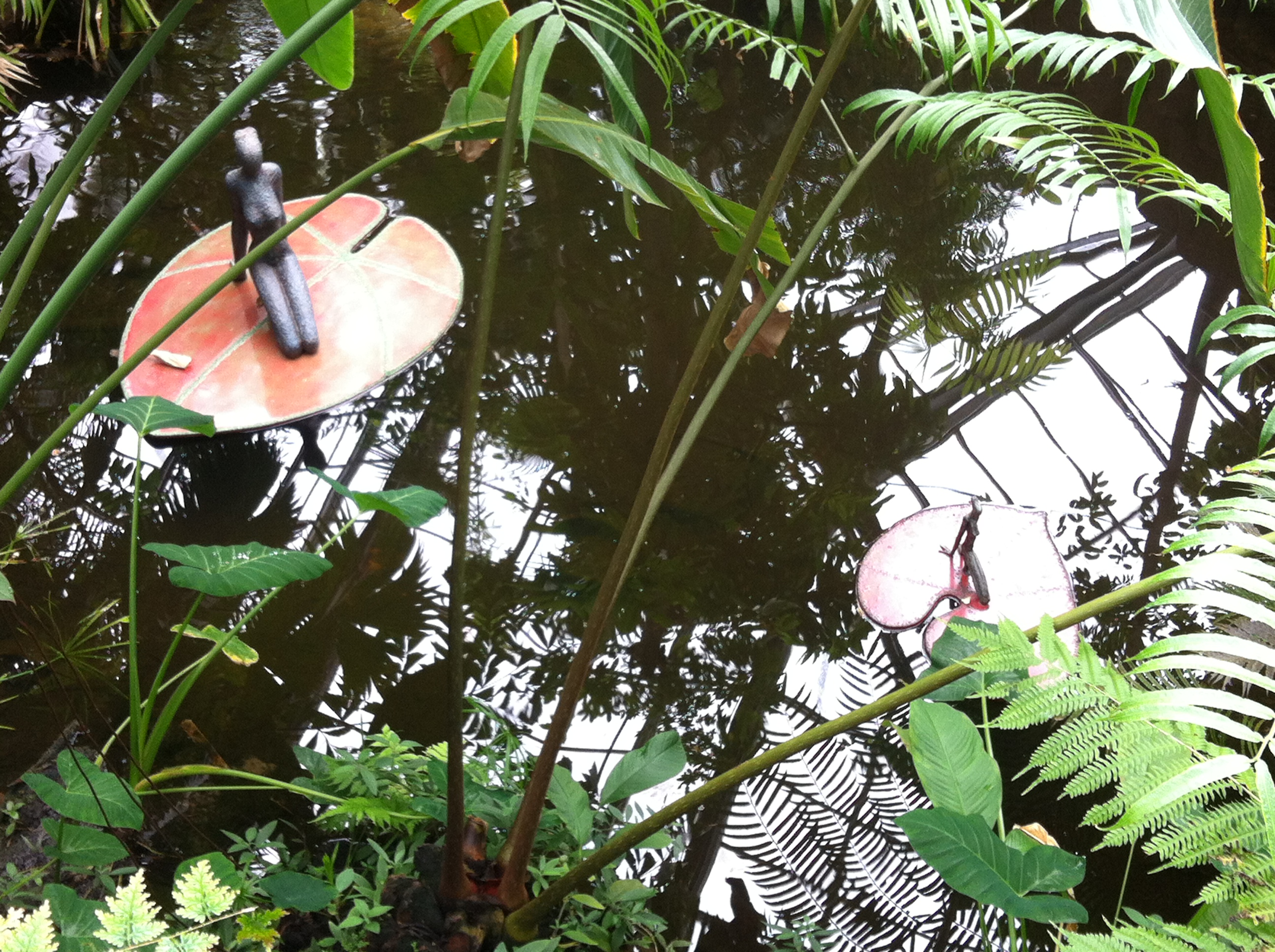
Wood-shaped mermaids floating on water

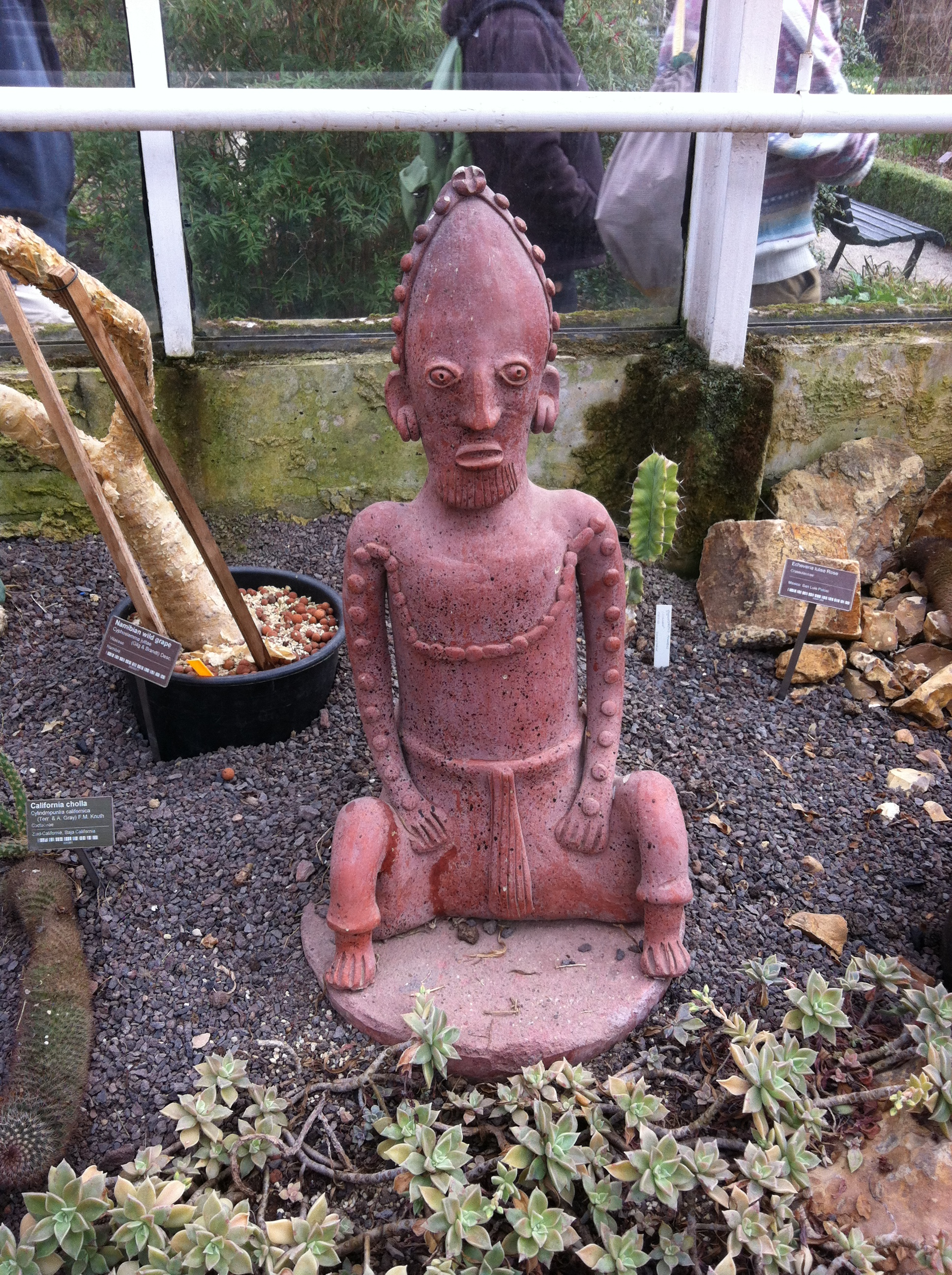
Stone statue

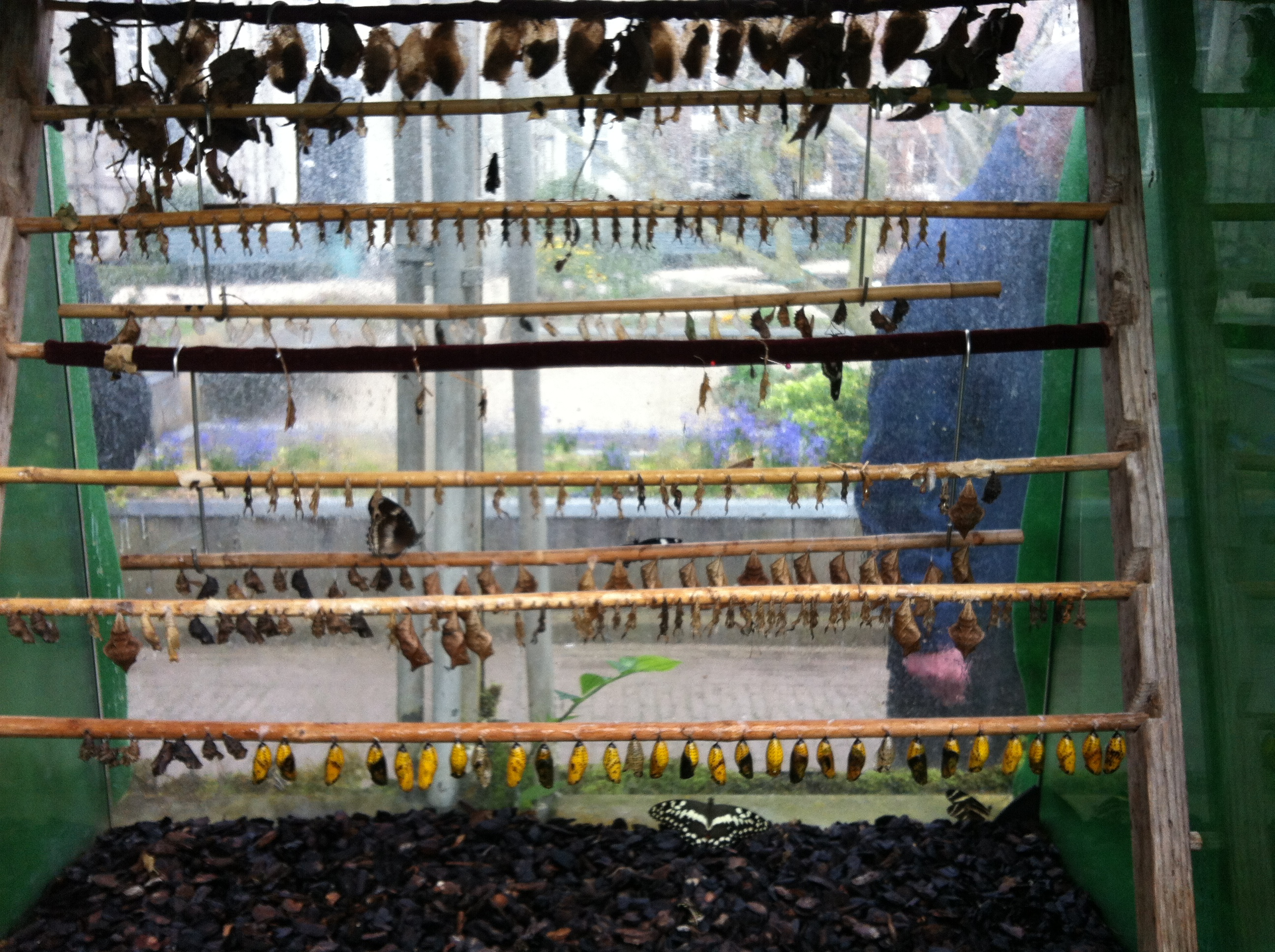
Butterfly cocoons

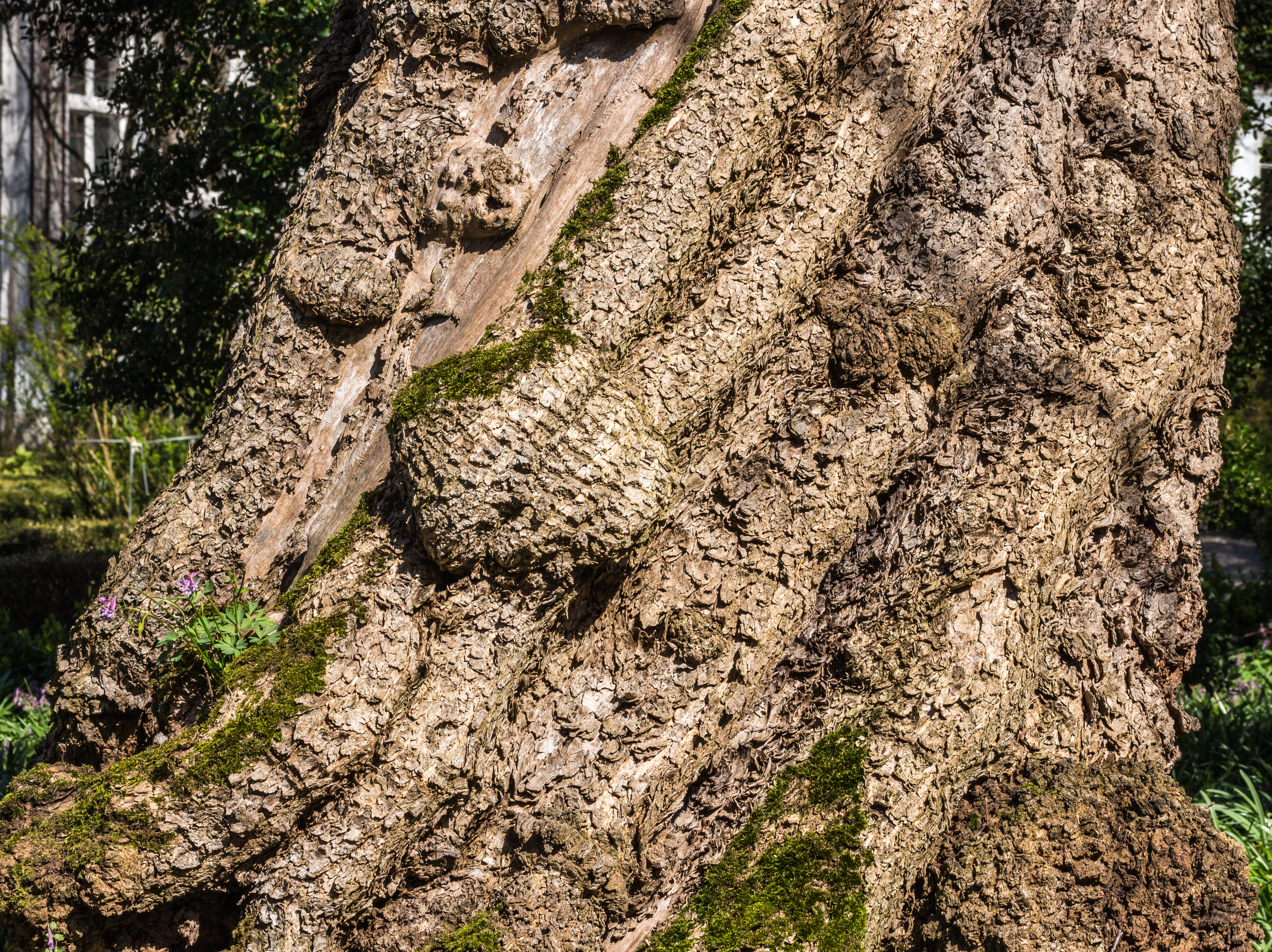
Trunk of the Catalpa bignonioides (detail).

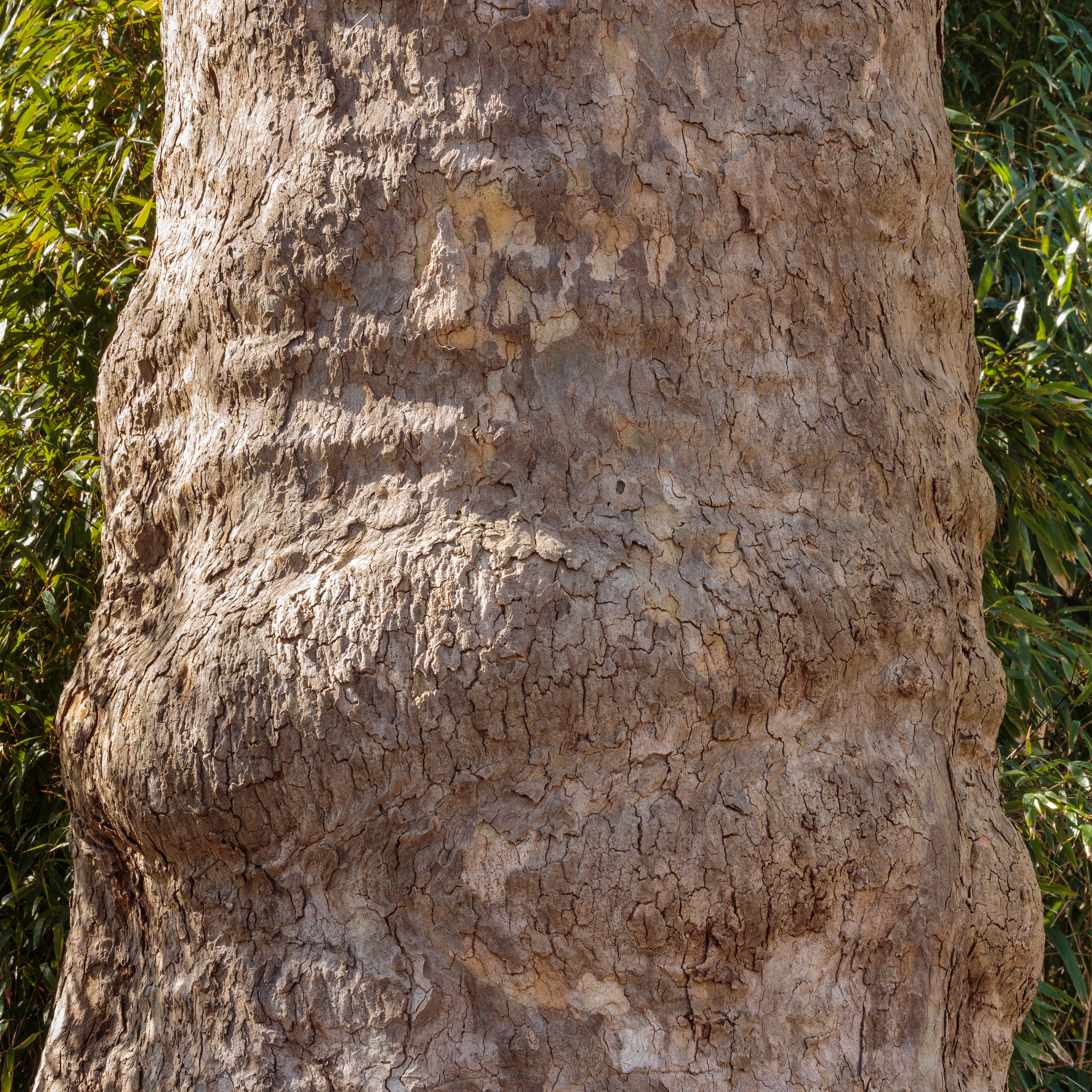
Trunk of the Platanus × hispanica (detail).

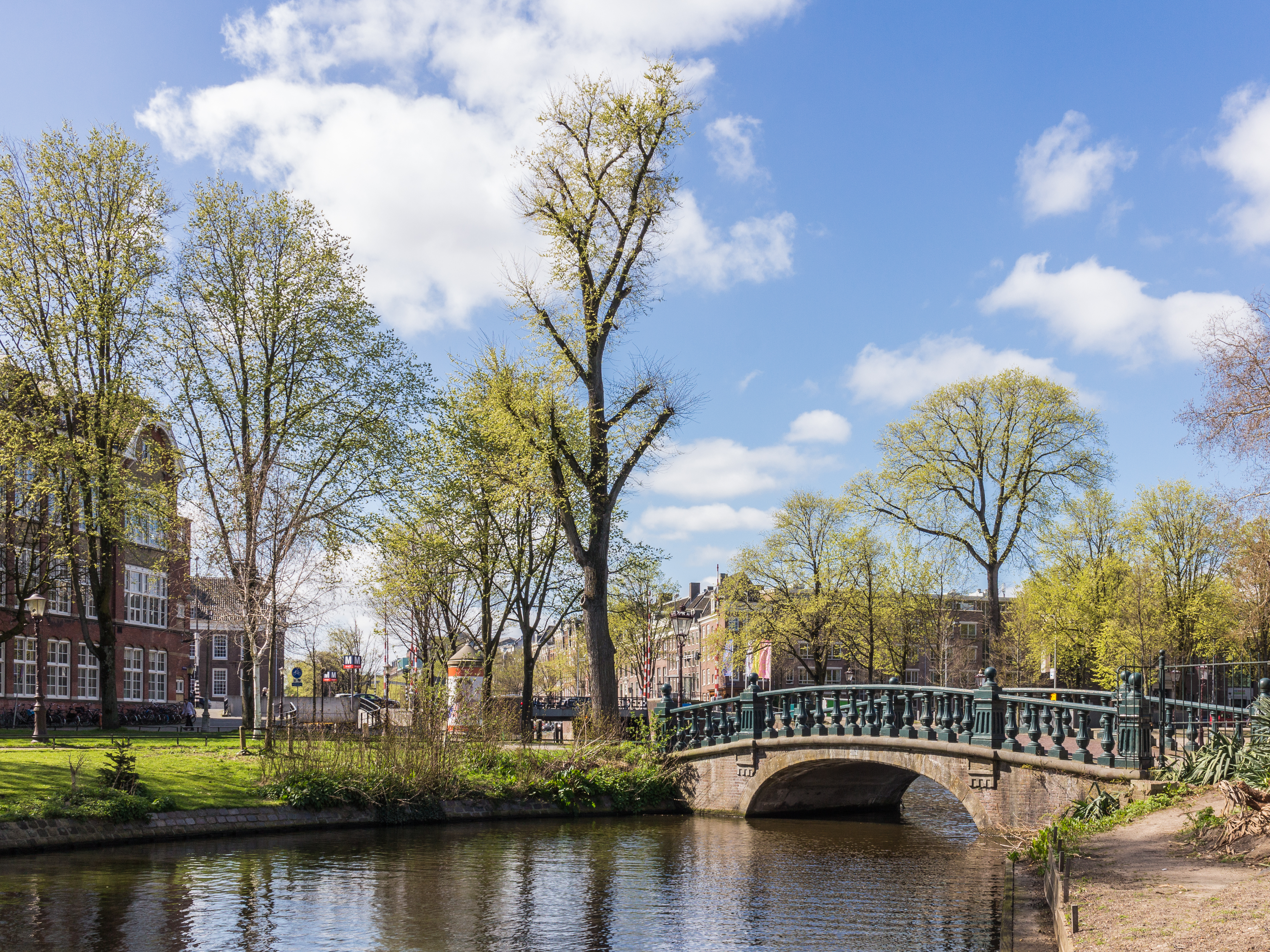
Bridge 233, Dr. D.M. Sluyspad over the Nieuwe Herengracht
