= Botanical illustration =

Drawing or painted image of plants and their components

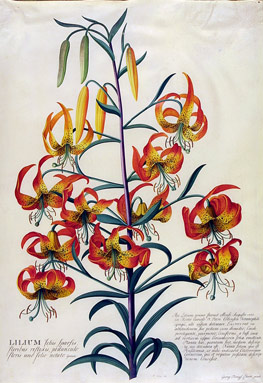
American Turk's cap lily, Lilium superbum, Georg Dionysius Ehret (1708–70), About 1750–53, Watercolor and gouache on vellum V&A Museum no. D.589-1886

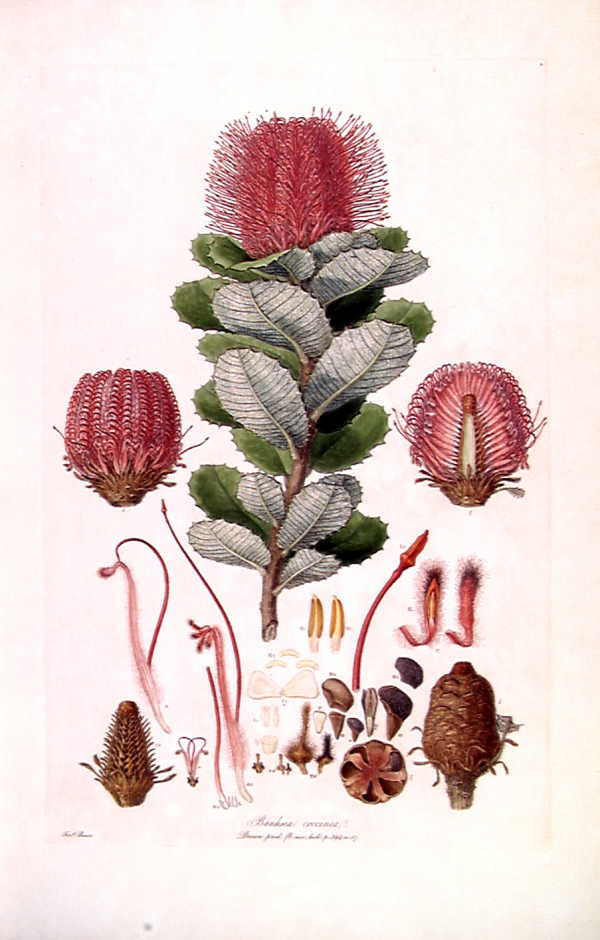
Banksia coccinea from Ferdinand Bauer's 1813 work Illustrationes Florae Novae Hollandiae

Botanical illustration is the art of depicting the form, color, and details of plant species. They are generally meant to be scientifically descriptive about subjects depicted and are often found printed alongside a botanical description in books, magazines, and other media. Some are sold as artworks. Often composed by a botanical illustrator in consultation with a scientific author, their creation requires an understanding of plant morphology and access to specimens and references.

Many illustrations are in watercolour, but may also be in oils, ink, or pencil, or a combination of these and other media. The image may be life-size or not, though at times a scale is shown, and may show the life cycle and/or habitat of the plant and its neighbors, the upper and reverse sides of leaves, and details of flowers, buds, seed and root system.

The fragility of dried or otherwise preserved specimens, and restrictions or impracticalities of transport, saw illustrations used as valuable visual references for taxonomists. In particular, minute plants or other botanical specimens only visible under a microscope were often identified through illustrations. To that end, botanical illustrations used to be generally accepted as types for attribution of a botanical name to a taxon. However, current guidelines state that on or after 1 January 2007, the type must be a specimen 'except where there are technical difficulties of specimen preservation or if it is impossible to preserve a specimen that would show the features attributed to the taxon by the author of the name.' (Arts 40.4 and 40.5 of the Shenzen Code, 2018).

== History ==
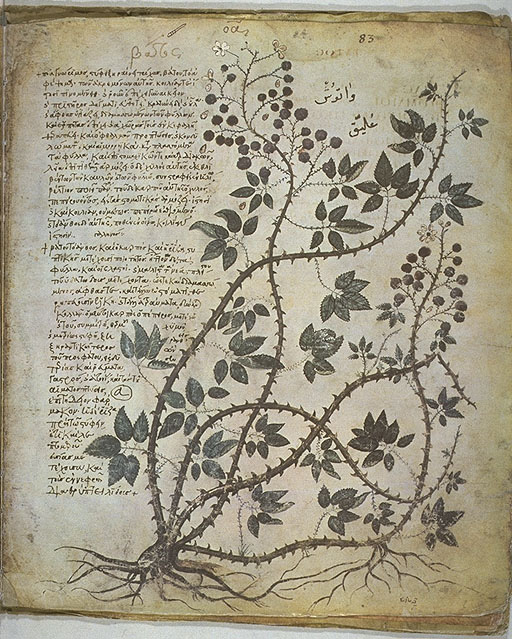
Blackberry. Vienna Dioscurides, early sixth century

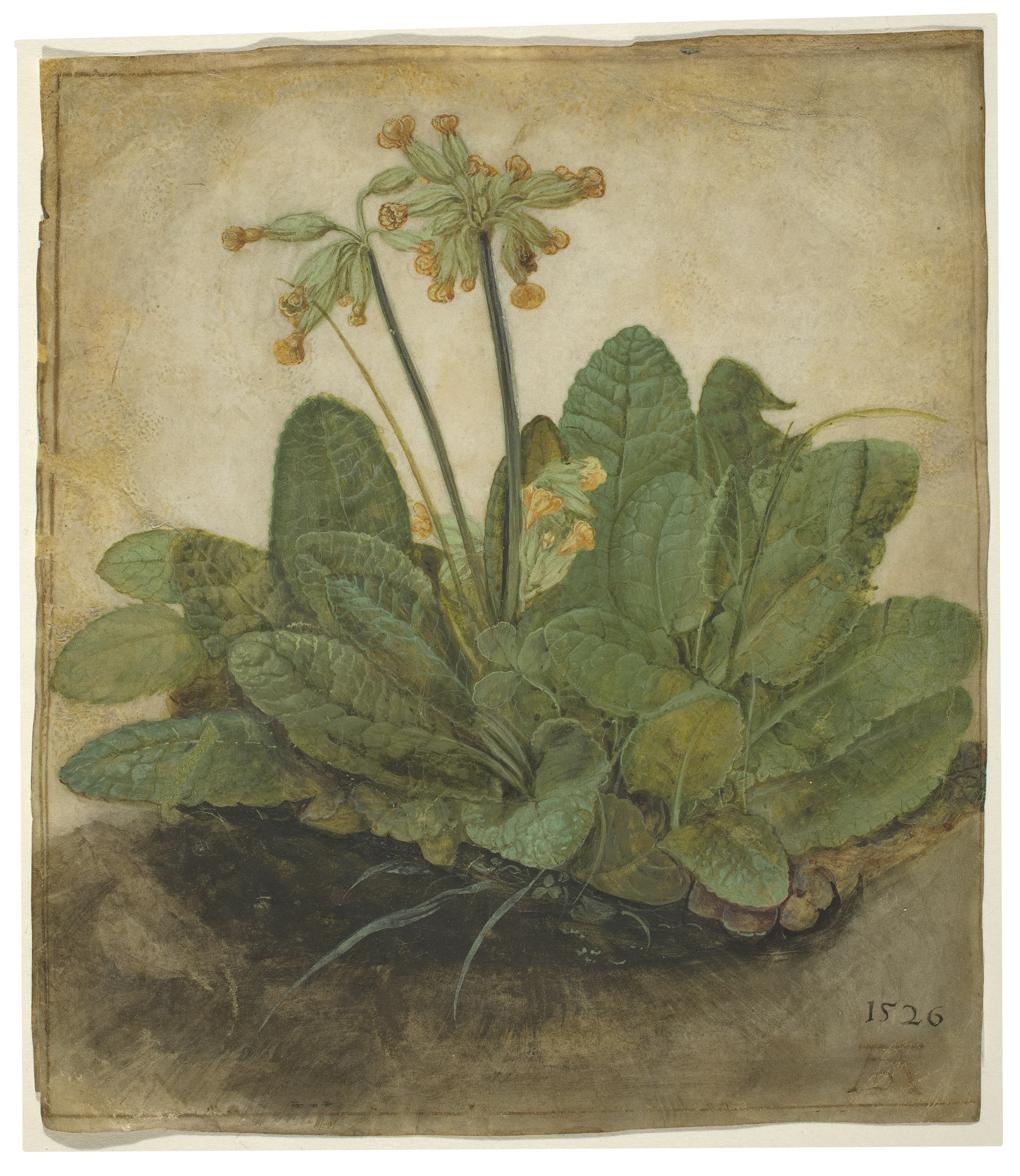
Tuft of Cowslips (1526) by Albrecht Dürer, gouache on vellum, collection of the National Gallery of Art

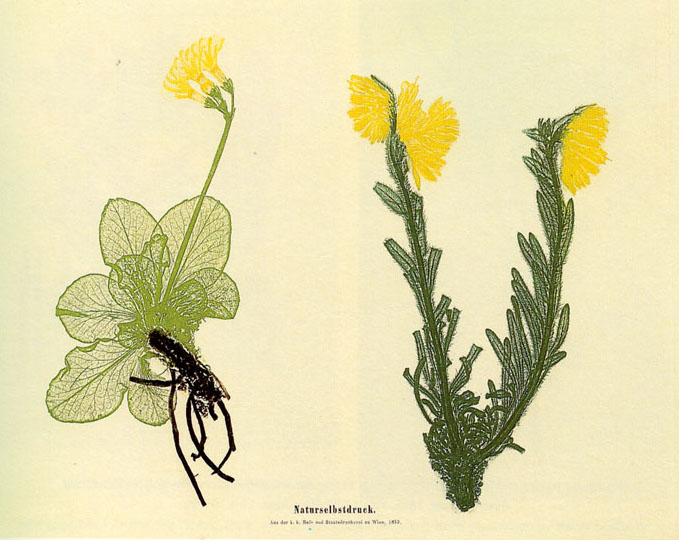
Electrotype - 'nature printing' by Alois Auer (1853)

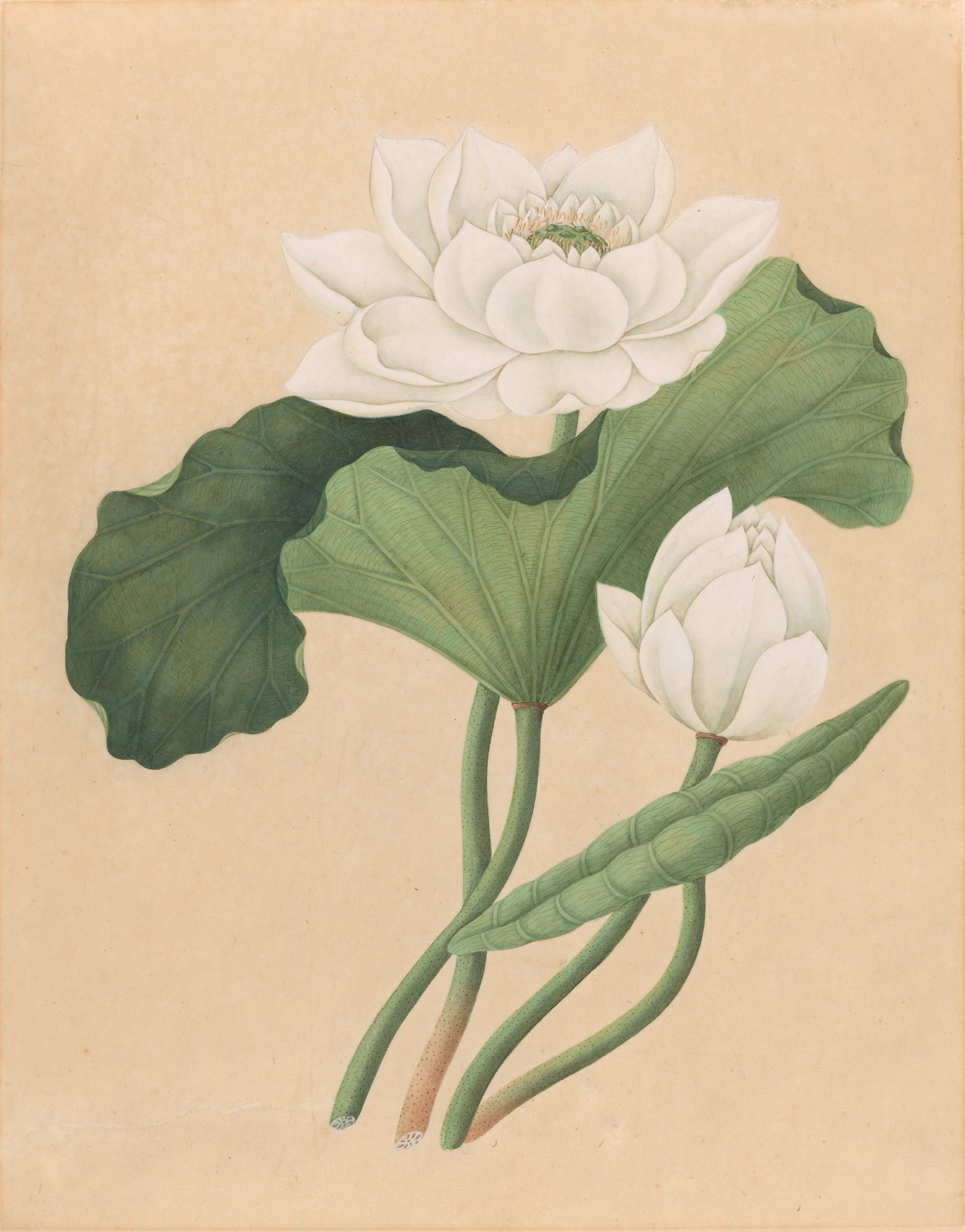
East Indian Lotus (Nelumbo nucifera), Gouache on oriental paper, late 19th century, National Gallery of Art, Washington, D.C.

=== Up to the 15th century ===
Early herbals and pharmacopoeia of many cultures include illustrations of plants, as in Ibn al-Baytar's Compendium on Simple Medicaments and Foods. Botanical illustrations in such texts were often created to assist with identification of a species for some medicinal purpose. The earliest surviving illustrated botanical work is the Vienna Dioscurides. It is a copy of Dioscorides's De Materia Medica, and was made in the year 512 for Juliana Anicia, daughter of the former Western Roman Emperor Olybrius. The illustrations did not accurately describe the plants, which was potentially hazardous to medicinal preparations.

The oldest surviving manuscript of the 4th-century Pseudo-Apuleius Herbarius, dates back to the 6th century. It includes stylized plant illustrations and their medicinal uses. Among the first people in Europe to take an interest in plants were monks and nuns, and physicians. Medicinal herbs were grown in monastic gardens and used for self-care and for tending to the sick in local communities. Hildegard von Bingen even wrote about natural medicine and cures in Causae et Curae and Physica. Matthaeus Platearius, a Salerno physician, is credited with the (12th century) "Circa Instans" manuscript, expanded over time into the Treatise on Herbs, containing 500-900 entries depending on version. Later illustrated versions, called Secreta Salernitana, produced from the 14th century onwards influenced later herbals, such as Le Grant Herbier (1498), and its translation, the Grete Herball (1526 or earlier), the first illustrated herbal in English. The illustrations were in fact copies of a series of woodcuts which first appeared in an earlier German herbal, and the same woodcut could be used to represent several plants.

Another notable medical and botanical manuscript is the "Tacuinum Sanitatis", derived from the Taqwīm aṣ Ṣiḥḥa (or "Maintenance of Health"), an 11th-century Arabic medical text by Ibn Butlan, a physician from Baghdad. The text was translated into Latin in the mid-13th century. It was profusely illustrated and widely circulated in Europe, especially in the 14th and 15th centuries. Four handsomely illustrated complete late 14th-century manuscripts of the Tacuinum, all produced in Lombardy, survive, including one in Paris. The Tacuinum was first printed in 1531.

There are many perfectly identifiable flowers in books like The Book of Hours (two volumes) by the Master of Flowers (Maître-aux-fleurs, 15th century) or Jean Bourdichon's Grandes Heures of Anne of Brittany (between 1503 and 1508), with 337 plants from the Queen's garden, captioned in Latin and French. These artists' objective was, though, purely artistic.

At the end of the 16th century, an illustrated manuscript such as the Erbario Carrarese (British Library, London, Egerton Ms.2020), revealed the increased importance attached to plant observation. It is an Italian translation (produced in Veneto between 1390 and 1404 for Francesco Novello da Carrara) of a Latin translation of the Carrara Herbarium, a medical treatise likely written in Arabic by Serapion the Younger at the end of the 12th century, The Book of Simple Medicaments.

Botany made great strides from the end of the 15th century onwards. Andrea Amadio's approach was scientific. Like Bourdichon, he was a miniature painter (who was born in Venice and died after 1450) but he illustrated a book written by a physician and scholar from Conegliano, Nicolò Roccabonella (1386–1459), the Liber de Simplicibus (known as the Codice Rinio, after the name of its second owner, Benedetto Rinio), between 1415 and 1449.

Printed herbals appeared in 1475; in 1485 Gart der Gesundheit, by Johannes de Cuba, was published in Mainz: it is the first printed book on natural history.

=== Sixteenth century ===
In the 15th and 16th centuries, botany developed as a scientific discipline distinct from herbalism and medicine, although it continued to contribute to both. Several factors contributed to the development and progress of botany during these centuries: the evolution from miniature painting or woodblock printing to more modern techniques; the invention (and improvements) of the printing press, which facilitated the widespread dissemination of botanical knowledge; the advent of paper for the preparation of herbariums; and the development of botanical gardens, which allowed for the cultivation, observation, and study of plants from diverse regions. These developments were closely tied to advancements in navigation and exploration, which led to botanical expeditions that introduced numerous previously unknown species to Europe. As explorers and botanists traveled to new lands, they collected plants and expanded both the scope of botanical knowledge and the range of plants available. Together, these factors significantly increased the number of known plant species and facilitated the global exchange of local and regional botanical knowledge. During this period, Latin remained the universal language of science, ensuring that botanical discoveries could be shared and understood across national and linguistic boundaries.

Christian Egenolff attached great importance to the illustrations included in the books he published: Herbarum, arborum, fruticum, frumentorum ac leguminem (Frankfurt, 1546) features 800 woodcuts of plants and animals. Some of the woodcuts used were engraved by Sebald Beham, Heinrich Steiner and Heinrich Köbel while others were reproduced from Otto Brunfels and engraver Hans Weiditz 's Herbarium vivae icones (Botanical Sketch Book, with hand-coloured woodcuts), which prompted Johannes Schott, the printer, to take legal action against him.

From 1530 onwards (thanks in particular to German herbalists) appeared the first books illustrated with woodcuts based on direct observation of live plants, as opposed to relying on older, often incorrect depictions from ancient texts. Such works included those by Otto Brunfels, illustrated by Hans Weiditz: Herbarum vivae eicones ("Living Images of Plants", 1530–1536, in three parts) and Contrafayt Kräuterbuch (1532–1537, in two parts).

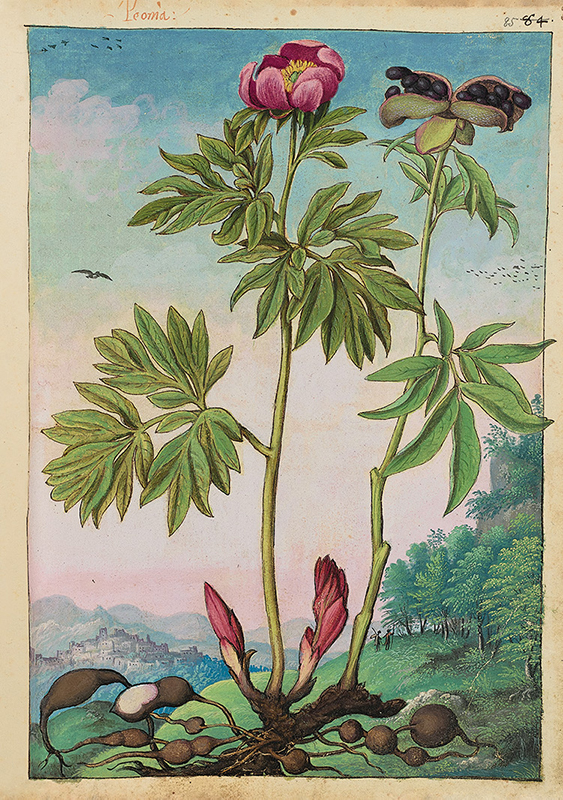
Paeony (Paeonia officinalis L.) by Gherardo Cibo in Mattioli's Dioscorides illustrated by Cibo (c. 1565), f. 85r

In 1533 the first chair of botany in Europe was established in Padua. Luca Ghini, an Italian physician and botanist, founded the Orto botanico di Pisa (Europe's first university botanical garden) in 1544 with the support of Cosimo I de' Medici and published his first herbarium that same year. He is credited with inventing the herbarium (known as "hortus siccus", dried garden), around 1520 or 1530. His compatriot Ulisse Aldrovandi compiled one of the first floras in the mid-16th century. Jacopo Ligozzi worked for both Ghini and Aldovrandi. Pietro Andrea Mattioli's botanical masterpiece was his Commentarii in libros sex Pedacii Dioscoridis, first published in Italian in 1544 with 500, and later 1,200 engravings. This work made a profound impression on the botanist Gherardo Cibo, who then illustrated some of the plants featured in Mattioli's work (with roots, flowers and fruit) in close-up set against a backdrop of a real (often inhabited) landscape depicting their natural environment. Many of the illustrations also feature two little botanists collecting specimens of the plant illustrated. The work (Pietro Andrea Mattioli, Discorsi, a herbal assembled and illustrated by Gherardo Cibo), dated 1564–1584, is accessible for online viewing on the British Library website. See the Gherardo Cibo page on Wikipedia in Latin for two more illustrations).

Euricius Cordus, one of the founders of botany in Germany, wrote the Botanologicon (1534) and his son, Valerius Cordus (1515–1544), was the author of very important works such as the Historia stirpium libri V (1561), published after his death, in which 502 species are described. Like his father, he relied on systematic observation of many of the same plants described by Pedanius Dioscorides.

The Swiss naturalist Conrad Gessner devoted much of his life to the study of botany. He published two works in 1541 and 1542, but the remainder of his botanical writings were not published until the middle of the 18th century. The woodcuts that illustrated them were often reused, depicting plants with their roots, flowers and seeds. According to Christine Velut, "specialists agree in attributing the first illustrated plate of tulips to K. Gesner's De Hortis Germaniae Liber... published in 1561".

Hieronymus Bock developed his own system to classify 700 plants. Bock also seems to have observed the plants for himself, since he includes ecological and distributional observations. His Kreuterbuch von Underscheidt, Würckung und Namen der Kreuter, so in teutschen Landen wachsen (1546), written in German, was illustrated by David Kandel.

The Age of Discovery and the introduction of as yet unknown plant species (and other wonders of nature) in Europe sparked a great interest in nature. This led to the accumulation of specimens (in cabinets of curiosities and botanical gardens), their classification, the creation of catalogues, botanical works, and the emergence of scientific illustration. The passion for horticulture created a market for floral still lifes (painted for aesthetic purposes) and for more scientific miniatures.

The Libellus de Medicinalibus Indorum Herbis is an Aztec manuscript describing the medicinal properties of various plants used by the Aztecs. It gives the Nahuatl names of the plants and includes an illustration. The Florentine Codex, an encyclopaedia of the Aztec world dating from the mid 16th century, includes a Nahuatl text, a Spanish text and illustrations. Book 11 is a treatise on natural history. In the 1570s, Francisco Hernández de Toledo embarked on the first scientific mission in the New World (and particularly New Spain), a study of the region's medicinal plants and animals, and brought back thousands of illustrations for which he was assisted by local artists, "tlacuilos".

It was to the Levant that Pierre Belon undertook extensive scientific travels to study fauna and botany. The work that he published in 1553 includes some illustrations.

Leonhart Fuchs published De historia stirpium commentarii insignes (1542), accompanied by illustrations at least as accurate as those by Hans Weiditz. The drawings are by Albrecht Meyer and the engravings by Veit Rudolph Speckle. Fuchs included ornamental plants and plants brought back from the Americas, and had the whole plants, including roots, flowers and fruits, illustrated from life so that they could be identified. His work was reprinted many times and in several languages. The engravings were also widely reused. The book named the contributing artists and included their portraits.

One way of copying precisely was offered by the Herbarium vivum: images were made by pressing ink-coated objects onto paper, leaving impressions; earlier methods used carbon black from soot. Impressions from dried plant materials could then be painted over in colour, pieces too bulky for pressing could be painted or drawn. Hieronymus Harder started a Herbarium vivum which reached 12 volumes, starting in 1562. Henrik Bernard Oldenland, a Cape Colony botanist assembled a Herbarium vivum of some 13 volumes at the end of the 17th c. Johann Hieronymus Kniphof's Herbarium Vivum of 1759 comprises some 1,200 botanical illustrations. In 1834 the astronomer John Herschel, faced with a similar problem of exact copying, used a camera lucida to copy the outlines of Cape Colony plants in pencil while his wife later painted the details. There are two illustrations on Wikipedia in Spanish.

The Flemish painter Pieter van der Borcht the Elder was one of the first to work in the new medium of copperplate engraving and etching that came into use after 1564. Woodcuts (like wood engravings, much later) allowed in-text illustrations, unlike intaglio processes. Van der Borcht began illustrating botanical works in 1565, when the Antwerp printer Christophe Plantin commissioned plates from him for the herbarium of Rembert Dodoens. Further commissions (more than 3000 watercolours in all, engraved by Arnold Nicolaï, then Gerard van Kampen and Cornelis Muller) followed for works by Dodoens, Matthias de l'Obel and Carolus Clusius (a pupil of Guillaume Rondelet, like Gaspard Bauhin as well as Rabelais. Pierre Richer de Belleval was one of Rondelet's successors in Montpellier).

Dodoens' Florum, coronariarum odoratarumque nonnullarum herbarum historia published by Plantin (1568) offers a description of ornamental flowers with engravings showing the whole plant (from flower to root). One whole chapter is devoted to tulips.

In France, Jacques Daléchamps's Historia generalis plantarum (1586) is a compilation of all the botanical knowledge of his time, lavishly illustrated with engravings.

Carolus Clusius, a French-speaking Flemish physician and botanist, created one of the first botanical gardens in Europe, the Hortus botanicus Leiden, and can be considered the world's first mycologist and the founder of horticulture, particularly of the tulip (of which he obtained seeds from Ogier Ghiselin de Busbecq). He was also the first to give truly scientific descriptions of plants. He translated the works of Dodoens. Rariorum plantarum historia (published by Plantin in 1601) is a compilation of works on botany published earlier and has a pioneering mycological study on mushrooms from Central Europe.

Joris Hoefnagel was a Flemish illuminator who belonged to the transitional period between medieval illumination and Renaissance still-life painting. He is known for his accurate representations of fruits, flowers and animals, which were taken as models by many other artists in the following centuries. Hoefnagel is also known to have painted birds (notably an illustration of the dodo) while working for the court of Emperor Rudolf II, famous for his cabinet of curiosities. His Amoris Monumentum Matri Charissimae (1589) shows a floral arrangement that seems to have been perceived at the precise moment when butterflies, caterpillars and snails appeared. The idea was often taken up again. His Archetypa studiaque patris Georgii Hoefnagelii (published by his son Jacob, in Frankfurt, in 1592) contains 48 engravings by Jacob (and perhaps Theodor de Bry or his son) based on studies that seem to have been made from life by Joris (who, according to Filippo Bonanni, had used a microscope).

=== Seventeenth century ===
Clara Peters (fl.1607–1676) was among the earliest specialist painters of still lifes and flowers, starting in 1607.

Theodor de Bry, draughtsman and engraver, published his Florilegium novum in 1612, consisting of 116 plates representing, as the full title emphasises, flowers and plants, with their roots and bulbs, engraved from nature. It appears that at least some of the plates were borrowed from Pierre Vallet (c. 1575–1657), engraver and embroiderer to Kings Henri IV and Louis XIII, who himself published two florilèges: Le Jardin du roy tres chrestien Henri IV (1608) and Le Jardin du roy tres chrestien Loys XIII (1623). Some of the plates are beautifully hand-colored. Both books were made for "those who wish to paint or illuminate, embroider or make tapestries". Johann Theodor de Bry greatly assisted his father. With the assistance of Matthäus Merian der Ältere he later published Florilegium renovatum et auctum, also known as Anthologia Magna (1641), an expanded version with 177 engraved plates.

Emanuel Sweerts, a tulip collector, published another florilegium: Florilegium by Emanuel Sweerts of Zevenbergen, living in Amsterdam [...] showing various flowers and other plants, in two parts, drawn from nature and rendered in four languages (Latin, German, French and Dutch). The first part is devoted to 67 bulb plants (32 varieties of tulips), and the second to 43 perennial plants. Each plate (all borrowed from de Bry's Florilegium) is numbered and refers to an index in which its name appears. The 1612 edition includes a preface in which the author gives the two addresses where tulips can be bought, in Frankfurt and Amsterdam : botanical illustration suddenly found a new outlet in the production of nursery catalogues.

Hortus Eystettensis (1613) is a "cabinet book" and, more precisely, a florilegium: it contains engravings of the plants grown in the garden created by the botanist Basilius Besler at the request of the Prince-Bishop of Eichstätt. The 367 engravings, mostly by Wolfgang Kilian, were designed to be painted, if necessary.

Margareta de Heer (1603–1665) primarily painted still lifes of birds, flowers, shells, and insects. In the 1650s, she painted various tulip varieties of that era. She rendered her subjects in great detail often using gouache on panel or parchment. Margaretha may have worked on commission for the botanist Henricus Munting (1583–1658).

Crispijn van de Passe the Older (1564–1637) and mostly (or only) his son Crispijn van de Passe the Younger (1594/1595-1670) published their Hortus Floridus in Utrecht from 1614 onwards. This is an engraved florilegium of more than a hundred unusual or rare plants, accurately depicted and classified according to their flowering season. The first plates show two views of a Dutch garden.

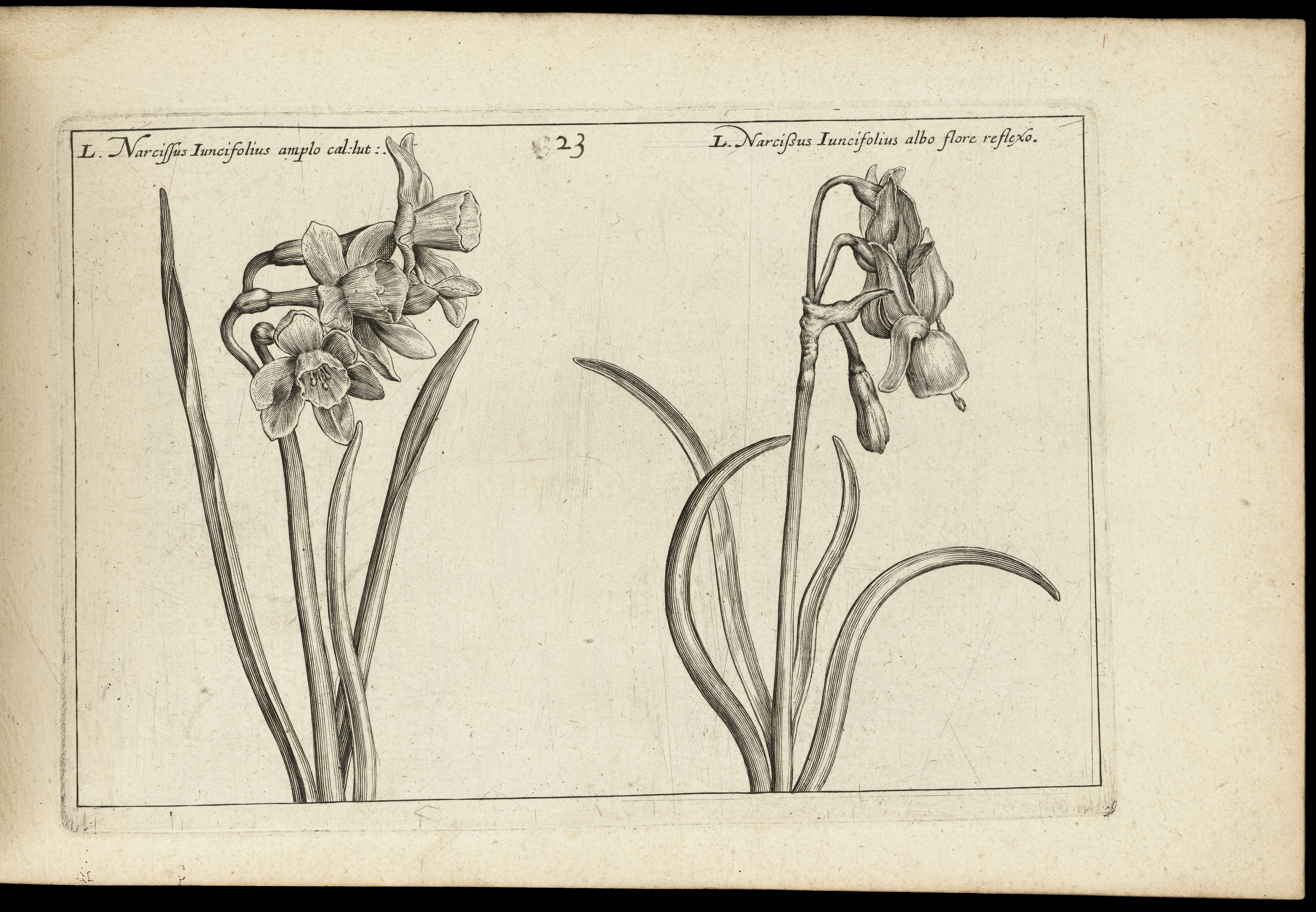
Illustration of a narcissus from the Hortus Floridus, published in 1614—1616

In 1616 was published Jardin d'hyver, or Cabinet des fleurs, containing in 26 elegies the rarest and most signal flowers of the most beautiful flowerbeds. Illustrated with excellent figures representing the most beautiful flowers of domestic gardens in their natural state (in particular anemones and tulips)... By Jean Franeau. The work included an initial index and engravings by Antoine Serrurier. The flowers most prized by 'florists' (garden lovers) are presented in the order of the seasons, starting with spring. (Herbaria were called "hortus hyemale" or "hiemale" in Latin ('winter garden'), or "hortus siccus" ('dry garden'), and did not take on this name until the 18th century).

Illustration of tulips by Jacob Marrel in 1636.

At the same time, the idea of the (private) pleasure garden, which originated in Italy, was brought to France during the great period of Hôtel particulier construction, mainly in Paris from the early 17th century onwards. These freestanding mansions were often built between an entrance court (on the street side) and a pleasure garden overlooking the private apartments. The Hôtel Lambert, built in 1640, had a terraced garden. "Follies" (summer houses) such as the Folie-Rambouillet (built from 1633 to 1635) had extensive 'pleasure gardens' to which André Mollet dedicated a book: Le Jardin de plaisir, contenant plusieurs desseins de jardinage (The Pleasure Garden, containing several garden designs), 1651.

Pinax theatri botanici (Illustrated Exposition of Plants, Basel, 1623) by Swiss botanist Gaspard Bauhin stands as one of the highest expressions of Renaissance European herbals. It describes thousands of plants and classifies them in a manner that foreshadowed the binomial nomenclature later developed by Linnaeus. Later editions were illustrated.

Johannes Bodaeus van Stapel helped revive and disseminate ancient botanical knowledge when he published Theophrastus' Historia Plantarum (c. 350 BC – c. 287 BC) in Amsterdam in 1644. It was not only a translation as he added his own commentary and annotations as well as detailed illustrations of plants.

Balthasar Moncornet published a number of works for ornamentalists, including Livre nouveau de fleurs très util pour l'art d'orfèvrerie et autres (a new book of flowers, very useful for the art of goldsmithing and others, Paris, 1645).

When in the 17th century, tulipomania swept through Holland, the commerce of tulips, along with the instability of their colors, provided additional incentive to have them painted. A book created in 1634 for Nicolaes Tulp contains over a hundred pages of tulips (along with insects and Mollusc shells) painted by Jacob Marrel. Tulip mania continued beyond the collapse of the market in 1637. In 1650 Jean Le Clerc (15..-163.), bookseller, publisher and engraver, published his Livre de fleurs où sont représentées toutes sortes de tulippes (Paris). Charles de La Chesnée-Monstereul followed suit with a book devoted entirely to tulips, Le Floriste françois (Caen, 1654). And in 1678, he published a Traité des tulipes.

Nicolas Guillaume de La Fleur (1608–1663), an engraver, painter and draughtsman from Lorraine, is known to have engraved flower plates in Rome in 1638-39 (published by Frederick de Wit, Amsterdam, 1650–1706), and to have worked in Paris c.1644. Painter Claude Boutet later recommended that those who wish to learn to paint flowers should copy his engravings: "Buy Nicolas-Guillaume la Fleur's Fleurs, which are sold at Mariette, ruë Saint-Jacques, at l'Espérance. They are very good." This suggests that there was a market for such books.

On his return to his estates in Idstein around 1646, John, Count of Nassau-Idstein built up a large cabinet of curiosities, had a garden laid out for himself, and invited Johann Jakob Walther to paint it: Le florilège dit de Nassau-Idstein, painted between 1654 and 1672, comprises 42 miniatures on vellum of flowers (familiar or exotic) and fruits, and views of the garden with beds in the shape of fruit. He was also the great-uncle of the painter François Walter, author of a Herbier du Bas-Rhin (1795).

The growing need for European naturalists to exchange ideas and information led to the creation of the first scientific academies, such as the Accademia dei Lincei (Italy, 1603), the Royal Society (1660), and the French Academy of Sciences (1666).

Denis Dodart (1634–1707), who oversaw the studies of the French Academy of Sciences from 1670 to 1694, played a pivotal role in the publication of Mémoires pour servir à l'histoire des plantes in 1676. This work proposed the creation of a comprehensive (and illustrated) catalogue of plant species.

Joachim Jungius was the first scientist to combine a philosophical mindset with precise observation of plants. For him, rigorous botanical terminology was essential, thus reducing the use of vague or arbitrary terminology in systematics. Jungius's Doxoscopia (1662) and Isagoge phytoscopica (Introduction to the study of plants, 1679) were published posthumously. His botanical theories were far ahead of their time and had little influence during his lifetime. It was John Ray who brought them to light by applying them to his own botanical classification work, and, through Ray, Carl von Linné eventually incorporated them into his own system.

Jacob Marrel's stepdaughter Maria Sibylla Merian, who published her first book in 1675, included insects in her floral pictures. Metamorphosis insectorum Surinamensium (1705) showed caterpillars and the plants to which they are attached. Her daughter Dorothea Maria Graff and her pupil Rachel Ruysch (daughter of the botanist and anatomist Frederik Ruysch) were also flower painters.

The most important work on plant systematics in the 17th century was the Historia generalis plantarum ('The General History of Plants', 1686) by John Ray (1627–1705), on which Linnaeus based his work and whom he proclaimed the 'founder' of systematics.

The botanist and draughtsman Charles Plumier, who made four botanical expeditions (the first one in 1689), brought back a (now lost) herbarium and many drawings: Description des plantes de l'Amérique was published after the second voyage (1693), and Nova plantarum americanarum genera (1703) after the third. These works include plates showing flowers and fruits at different stages of development. A few decades earlier, Flora Sinensis (Vienna, 1656) had been published by a Jesuit missionary, Michał Boym.

At the end of the 17th century, the first manuals for amateur painters appeared: in 1679, Claude Boutet published École de la mignature : Dans laquelle on peut facilement apprendre à peindre sans maître (Miniature art school: where you can easily learn to paint without a master'.). Chapters 88 and following are dedicated to the painting of flowers. The idea for the manual was taken up by a former pupil of Nicolas Robert, Catherine Perrot, received at the Académie royale de peinture et de sculpture (1682): The Royal Lessons, or the Method of Painting Miniatures of Flowers and Birds, based on an Explanation of the Books on Flowers and Birds by the late Nicolas Robert, Flower painter (1686), recommends (Preface and Chapter I) imitating Robert's works rather than those of one "Baptiste de la Fleur", presumably a nickname for rising star Jean-Baptiste Monnoyer whose Le Livre de toutes sortes de fleurs d'après nature shows flowers with botanical accuracy and served decorative designers for decades.

Joseph Pitton de Tournefort published his first work, Éléments de botanique ou méthode pour connaître les plantes, in 1694. In the preliminary notice, he noted that "the method followed is based on the structure of flowers and fruits. One cannot depart from it without getting into strange difficulties...". The book, illustrated with 451 excellent plates by Claude Aubriet, was an immediate success. Tournefort himself translated it into Latin as Institutiones rei herbariae as the use of Latin was still necessary to ensure a wide readership throughout Europe. He introduced a sophisticated hierarchy of classes, sections, genera and species, and was the first to systematically use a polynomial nomenclature.

Towards the end of the 17th century, the first microscopic observations of plants were made and the study of plant anatomy developed rapidly, which was to have a major influence on later classifications. Robert Hooke's Micrographia, (1667), contains a large number of observations made with the microscope. Modern plant pathology started with Robert Hooke illustrating a fungal disease, rose rust (1665). Marcello Malpighi used the microscope to study the anatomy of all kinds of organisms; his work, Anatomia Plantarum (1675), contains studies of plant anatomy and systematic descriptions of the different parts of plants. Nehemiah Grew's The Anatomy of Plants (1682) displays detailed anatomical diagrams and cross sections of flowers and other plant structures, including the first known microscopic description of pollen.

This makes it all the more curious to see that Abraham Munting's best known work, Naauwkeurige Beschryving Der Aardgewassen (Description of Terrestrial Plants, 1696), shows plants against a background of classic or pastoral landscapes. His Phytographia curiosa, 1702, also has inhabited landscapes in the background, reminiscent of the work of Gherardo Cibo at the end of the 16th century.

Agnes Block (1629-1704) was an art collector and horticulturalist of exotic plants. Many artists visited Vijverhof, her country estate, to paint her plants. They included Alida Withoos (c1660-1730) and her brother Pieter Withoos (1655-1692), Maria Sibylla Merian and her daughter Johanna Helena Herolts-Graff, Pieter Holsteyn II, Herman Saftleven, Rochus van Veen, Nicolaes de Vree as well as Jan Moninckx (c1656-1714) and his daughter Maria Moninckx (1673–1757), who are best known for the colour plates they created and which make up the nine-volume Moninckx Atlas. This was published in the period 1686–1709 and depicted 420 plants from the Hortus Medicus of Amsterdam.

=== 18th century ===
After the emergence of plant anatomy in the 17th, the 18th century saw that of plant physiology, which has since had a profound influence on the development of all areas of botany. Stephen Hales is considered the father of plant physiology for his many experiments in Vegetable Staticks (1727).

As for Carl Linnaeus, he is widely recognized as the father of modern botanical nomenclature. Linnaeus introduced several key innovations in taxinomy. First, he applied binomial nomenclature, assigning each species a two-part Latin name, while also emphasizing detailed morphological characterization. This system allowed for clearer, more systematic classification. Additionally, he implemented a precise terminology for describing plant morphology, especially floral and fruit structures. Building on Jungius's work, Linnaeus carefully defined terms that became standard in botanical descriptions. Through his major works—Systema Naturae (1735) and Species Plantarum (1753), —he revolutionized taxonomy, creating a framework still used today. In Hortus Cliffortianus (1737), a collaboration between Linnaeus and the illustrator Georg Dionysius Ehret, he described 2536 genres et espèces de plantes. He organised their list according to the system he had established in the Specis Plantarum and in the Systema Naturae. To name the plants, he relied on his Critica Botanica. Ehret used many "exploded details" showing intricate dissections

As botanical nomenclature became more structured and taxonomic classifications were regularly documented in scientific publications, botanical illustrations remained essential to provide clear, detailed depictions of plants that helped botanists, horticulturists, and enthusiasts accurately identify various species. A growing number of amateur botanists, gardeners, and natural historians provided a market for floras and other botanical publications and illustrations increased the appeal and accessibility of these to the general reader.

Johann Wilhelm Weinmann, in his Phytanthoza Iconographia (1737–1745), collaborated with Bartholomäus Seutter, Johann Elias Ridinger, and Johann Jakob Haid. These artists produced over 1,000 hand-coloured mezzotint engravings of several thousand plants, including depictions of tulips, and what to Europeans were then exotic, newly discovered flora and fauna, such as the banana tree, making this book one of the most comprehensive and highly regarded color-plate florilegia of its time. Haid also worked on the Plantae selectae (1750) of Christoph Jakob Trew, alongside Georg Dionysius Ehret (who also contributed to Hans Sloane's protégé Mark Catesby's Natural History of Carolina, Florida and the Bahama Islands (1729–1747) (also with coloured engravings).

John Miller published Illustratio Systematis Sexualis Linnaei (Illustration of the Sexual System of Linnaeus, 1770–1777) which helped popularize the work of Linnaeus to English readers.

In the mid-19th century, extensive horticultural studies emerged, including Henri-Louis Duhamel du Monceau's Traité des arbres et arbustes qui se cultivent en France en pleine terre, 1755, or Traité des arbres fruitiers, 1768. Robert Sweet, originally trained as a gardener, published a number of works on plants cultivated in British gardens and hothouses with plates mainly drawn by Edwin Dalton Smith, and The Florist's Guide and Cultivator's Directory, both aimed at plant enthusiasts and their gardeners.

An early pomologist like Jean-Baptiste de La Quintinie, Johann Hermann Knoop published Pomology, or description of the best kinds of apples and pears (1758) and said illustrations were indispensable to help avoid mistakes caused by the fact that the same fruit was (still) often known by different names. In England, Batty Langley published Pomona, or The Fruit-garden illustrated (London, 1728).

Jan van Huysum, known for his bouquets of flowers and particularly his tulips, contributed to John Hill's Eden, or, A Compleat Body of Gardening, 1757, written with Thomas Hale. Hill is mostly remembered for The Vegetable System, 1759–1775, a huge botanical work illustrated by 1,600 copper-plate engravings.

An early mycologist Jacob Christian Schäffer published several richly illustrated volumes on mushrooms "depicted in their natural colors" (1759). Michel Étienne Descourtilz, Des champignons comestibles, suspects et vénéneux... (Edible, suspect and poisonous mushrooms... Accompanied by ten plates of drawings made from life, carefully coloured and representing two hundred species grouped together in the terrain that feeds them, 1827).

Nikolaus Joseph von Jacquin's most influential publication may have been Selectarum Stirpium Americanarum Historia (1763), which detailed many plants from the Americas as he had been sent to the West Indies, Central America, Venezuela and New Granada (1755–1759). He also introduced many exotic species to Europe.

Pierre-Joseph Buc'hoz, Herbier colorié de l'Amérique (Coloured herbarium of America, 1762) and more usefully, perhaps, Lettres sur la méthode de s'enrichir promptement, et de conserver sa santé, par la culture des végétaux exotiques, 1768.

There were other botanical expeditions, such as James Cook's first voyage around the world (1768–1771), during which Joseph Banks and Daniel Solander increased the known flora of the world by 25 percent (Banks' Florilegium was published much later).

The first volumes of Charles Louis L'Héritier de Brutelle's Stirpes Novae (New Plants) were published in Paris in 1784–85, with full-page illustrations of all newly discovered species. Beginning with the second volume, the plates were drawn by Pierre-Joseph Redouté, marking the beginning of his recognition as a talented botanical illustrator.

Jacob Christoph Le Blon and Jacques Fabien Gautier d'Agoty invented a four-colour printing printing process in Collection des plantes usuelles, curieuses et étrangères... et imprimées en couleur (1767). Pierre Bulliard developed a different and cheaper colour printing process.

Botanical illustration accompanied the development of agronomy (a term that appeared in the late 18th century) and the seed trade. Johann Simon von Kerner, Illustration of All Economic Plants (Abbildung aller oekonomischen Pflanzen, Stuttgart 1786–96) is a notable example from this period. Vegetables, overlooked by illustrators after the vogue for herbals waned, resurfaced thanks to seed merchants like Vilmorin-Andrieux, who employed botanical artists (before 1783).

A new genre of books appeared, that of botanical monographs like Carl Wilhelm Ernst Putsche's Versuch einer Monographie der Kartoffeln (on potatoes, 1819) or like Pierre-Joseph Redouté's Geraniologia (1787–1788), Les Liliacées (1802–1816), for which Redouté practised colour-printed stipple engraving or Les Roses (1817–1824), or John Lindley's Rosarum Monographia. Sarah Drake was a major contributor to Lindley's Edwards's Botanical Register.

The first botanical magazines were published in the late 18th century : "Curtis's Botanical Magazine" (1787 to the present), launched by William Curtis, is one of the most famous and long-running botanical magazines. It has employed many talented illustrators giving detailed views as well as exploded details and cross sections. Sydenham Edwards worked for Curtis's magazine and then to The Botanical Register. With a wider audience and ever increasing publication material, specialized journals such as this one or the Annales de chimie et de physique (Paris, 1789) reflect the growing division between scientific disciplines in the Enlightenment era. The Linnean Society of London, a learned society dedicated to the study and dissemination of information concerning natural history, evolution, and taxonomy, was founded in 1788.

George Voorhelm Schneevoogt (1775–1850)'s Icones plantarum rariorum (Illustrations of rare and beautiful flowers and plants, drawn, engraved and colored after nature, 1793) has hand-coloured illustrations by Hendrik Schwegman and text in Dutch, French and German.

Jean Goulin and Labeyrie led the team that created a dictionary of useful plants, trees and shrubs (1793–94).

Étienne Pierre Ventenat published Description des plantes nouvelles et peu connues, cultivées dans le jardin de J.-M. Cels (1799), a horticulturist, and Jardin de la Malmaison (1803) both with illustrations by Redouté. The Château de Malmaison housed a collection of rare plants.

==== Gallery ====
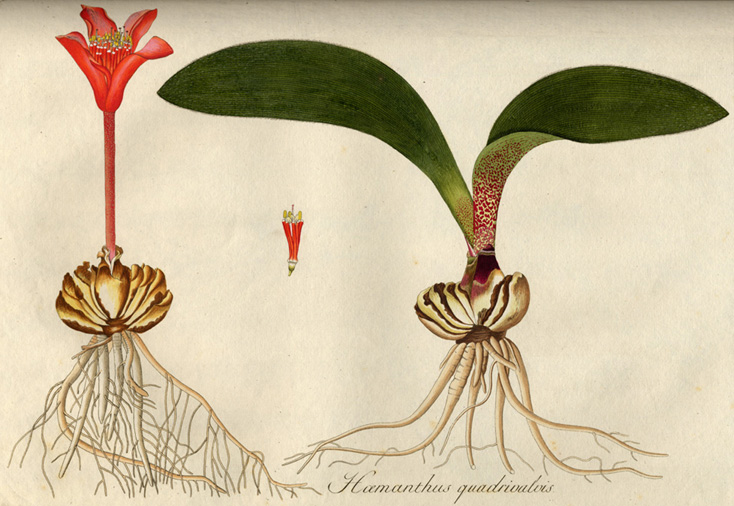
Haemanthus pubescens L., Nikolaus Joseph von Jacquin 1798

=== 19th century ===
In the 19th century a number of different methods of colour printing were developed in Europe, using including chromoxylography, which became the most successful of several methods of colour printing developed in the 19th century, and chromolithography. Other methods were developed by printers such as Jacob Christoph Le Blon, George Baxter and Edmund Evans, and mostly relied on using several woodblocks with different colours. Hand-colouring also remained important. From 1801, William Say worked on steel plates rather than the usual, less durable, copper plates used since the early 16th century. However, Jean-Michel Papillon revived the art of engraving, which reached a new peak with Thomas Bewick, who engraved the woodblocks "across the grain", making them much more durable. Robert John Thornton, A new family herbal, 1810, was engraved by T. Bewick. Invented in 1796 lithography quickly became the standard.

Jan Kops' first issue of Flora Batava was published in Amsterdam in 1800 (last one 1934), with most of the illustrations in the first three volumes by Georgius Jacobus Johannes van Os), a flower and fruit painter for the Sèvres porcelain factory.

Charles Alexandre Lesueur took part in the Baudin expedition to Australia (1800–1803) as a draughtsman, and ended his life as curator of the Natural History Museum of Le Havre. The painter Michel Garnier took part in the same expedition, which he left in 1801: he brought back numerous paintings of flowers and fruits from Mauritius and La Réunion which were later purchased and exhibited in the "Carporama" (a collection of wax models of exotic fruits from Mauritius, by Robillard d'Argentelle) of the Museum d'Histoire naturelle.

Pierre Antoine Poiteau, both a botanist and artist, was a student of Gérard van Spaendonck and a disciple of Pierre-Joseph Redouté. Early in his career, he focused on collecting specimens in the Caribbean. In 1794, Pierre Jean François Turpin met botanist Poiteau in Hispaniola. Poiteau introduced Turpin to botany, and together, they studied and documented around 800 species from the Haitian flora. Between 1801 and 1820, Poiteau and Turpin created an extensive album of botanical drawings, featuring 147 original pieces. These illustrations depicted a vast array of European and exotic plants, often accompanied by detailed annotations on plant anatomy, including flowers, leaves, seeds, and fruits at various stages of development. While a few drawings were done in black ink or pencil, most were finely enhanced with watercolor. Many were published in Flora Parisiensis, by Poiteau and Turpin (1808) and some by Turpin (and Ernestine Panckoucke) in Flore médicale by François-Pierre Chaumeton (1814–1820). The most striking drawings were included in François-Richard de Tussac's Flore des Antilles ou Histoire générale botanique, rurale et économique des végétaux indigènes des Antilles (Paris, chez L'Auteur, 1808), one of the earliest illustrated works on Caribbean flora. Flore des Antilles featured 50 engraved plates, some in color and some in black engraved after drawings by Redouté and others. Turpin also illustrated Jean Louis Marie Poiret's Leçons de flore (1819–1820). Tussac is also remembered for an ill-advised Cri des colons against l'abbé Grégoire's De la littérature des Nègres (1810). By 1815, Poiteau had become the chief gardener of the royal nurseries at the Château de Versailles, later holding similar positions at the Château de Fontainebleau and the Muséum national d'histoire naturelle in Paris. He contributed to the Revue horticole (published 1829–1974). As for Turpin, he contributed to many botanical publications, including Icones selectae plantarum (1820–1840), and was elected a member of the Académie royale des sciences in 1833. He also collaborated with notable figures such as Delessert, Pyrame de Candolle, von Humboldt, Bonpland and others.

Ferdinand Bauer illustrated Flora Graeca (1806–1840) and Illustrationes florae Novae Hollandiae (1813 - "Nova Hollandia" was the name applied to Australia).

The naturalist Antoine Risso published an essay on lemon trees (1813) that had acclimatized well on the French Riviera, only a few decades after it started becoming a fashionable health resort for the British upper class.

New fields of study appeared : Lichenology (pioneered by Erik Acharius), Phycology (William Henry Harvey), Palaeobotany (Kaspar Maria von Sternberg).

In 1813, a Swiss botanist, Augustin Pyramus de Candolle, published Théorie Élémentaire de la Botanique, in which he placed emphasis on the study of evolutionary relationships in grouping plants together, rather than on shared morphological characteristics. He also contributed to phytogeography, agronomy and economic botany.

Johann Matthäus Bechstein and Giorgio Gallesio both depicted plants alongside the animals that affect them. Bechstein's Naturgeschichte der schädlichen Waldinsecten (1798–1800) focused on harmful forest insects, thus offering valuable insights for forestry and agricultural entomology. Gallesio's Pomona Italiana (1820) focused on fruit cultivation in Italy and the insects and animals that affect the trees' growth and health.

During the Victorian-era craze known as orchidelirium, more monographs were produced. John Lindley, a pioneering orchidologist, published The Genera and Species of Orchidaceous Plants (1830) and Sertum Orchidaceum (1837-1841 - and, in collaboration with William Hutton, a pioneering book on paleobotany, The fossil flora of Great Britain; or, Figures and descriptions of the vegetable remains found in a fossil state in this country. Famous orchid illustrators also include John Nugent Fitch, who contributed 528 plates to Thomas Moore's The Orchid Album (1882–97). Fitch also contributed to Curtis's Botanical Magazine.

Kew Gardens was founded in 1840, around the same time as Victorian British horticulturists also developed a passion for ferns, pteridomania, which led to the creation of a new botanical journal, The Phytologist (1841) and more monographs like The Ferns of Great Britain and Ireland (1855), also by Thomas Moore, illustrated by Henry Bradbury, who used Alois Auer's 'nature printing' process. Constantin von Ettingshausen's Physiotypia Plantarum Austriacarum is a landmark nature-printed book, originally featuring 530 plates (Vienna, c. 1855), later expanded to 1,000 plates in a 1873 Prague edition.

Walter Hood Fitch was known for the length of his career (1834–88), substantial output, and collaboration with contemporary botanists such as Joseph Dalton Hooker, a founder of phytogeography (Flora Antarctica, 1844–1859; The Rhododendrons of Sikkim-Himalaya, 1849–51). Fitch's illustrations also appeared in Curtis's Botanical Magazine. He was one of the first to use chromolithography for botanical illustrations.

The agronomist Arsène Thiébaut de Berneaud, in his Traité élémentaire de botanique et de physiologie végétale, Paris, 1837, offers advice to all those who cultivate plants, with a wealth of illustrations.

Anne Pratt, an autodidactic woman, rose to prominence when she published books (starting around 1840) she illustrated with chromolithographs.

Louis van Houtte started the horticultural journal Flore des serres et des Jardins de l'Europe in 1845. Collaborators on the journal were Charles Lemaire, and Michael Scheidweiler.

When Eugène Delacroix painted flower pictures in 1848–49, he opposed his approach to that of botanical artists, regretting "the study of details, which [some painters] have carried to a very high point," and for his part decided to "subordinate details to the whole" and "try to make pieces of nature as they appear in gardens, only by bringing together in the same frame and in a somewhat probable way the greatest possible variety of flowers."

Anna Atkins hand-printed several albums of botanical and textile specimens, especially Photographs of British Algae: Cyanotype Impressions (between 1843 and 1853),[9] "the first photographically printed and illustrated book".

In 1856 Iinuma Yokusai published the Somoku-zusetsu, the first botanical encyclopedia in Japan to use Linnaean taxonomy. Iwasaki Tsunemasa had already started publishing Honzō Zufu (Iconographia Plantarum or Diagrams and Chronicles of Botany) a woodblock illustrated work (1828–1921).

In the 1870s, Leopold Kny created a series of large, detailed botanical wall charts (Botanische Wandtafeln). These charts depicted various plant structures, including roots, flowers, and leaves, in great detail and at a large scale, making them useful for teaching botany in classrooms. Teachers could also use Robert and Reinhold Brendel's papier-mâché models (For more details, see Wikipedia in French: Modèles Brendel, or in German: Robert Brendel (Modellbauer)). Deyrolle also published wall charts (planches didactiques).

After several expeditions to South and Central America, Jean Jules Linden made a detailed study of orchid growth conditions in their natural habitat. His findings revolutionised the cultivation of orchids under European conditions. Upon his return to Belgium, he became a prominent commercial orchid grower. Linden published exceptional books on orchids and their cultivation, commissioning leading botanical illustrators to create a number of chromolithographs. His Iconographie des Orchidées (17 volumes, 1885–1903) is monumental.

Many of the plates in the first series and all of the plates in the second series were executed by the noted botanical illustrator Walter Hood Fitch, called by Blunt & Stearn "the most outstanding botanical artist of his day in Europe". Fitch was the preferred artist of eminent British botanist William Jackson Hooker, the first director of Kew Gardens. His publishing career lasted at least from 1851 to 1880. Fitch also illustrated Henry John Elwes's Monograph of the Genus Lilium (1880), while his comprehensive The Trees of Great Britain & Ireland (1906–1913), with Augustine Henry, seems to contain primarily photogravures, but their author is not specified.

Botanical illustration took a new direction with the rise of Art Nouveau, which was popular between 1890 and 1910. Art Nouveau artists included Eugène Grasset, whose publication Plants and Their Application to Ornament (1896) emphasized the importance of studying natural forms in art . His student, Maurice Pillard Verneuil, wrote Etude de la plante : son application aux industries d'art (1903), which featured real, detailed botanical plates. Another significant figure was Anton Seder, though he is best remembered for his more stylized designs. Particularly noteworthy were the artists of the École de Nancy—including Louis Majorelle, Émile Gallé, and the Daum glassworks—who drew inspiration from the natural flora of the Lorraine region. Despite their regional focus, these artists, like others in the Art Nouveau movement, often popularized exotic plant forms such as orchids. One of the most botanically inclined among them may have been Henri Bergé, a decorator for Daum, who produced many hand-painted botanical plates for the Encyclopédie florale (1895–1930), now preserved at the Musée de l'École de Nancy". These plates served as a source of inspiration for Daum's artisans, who were trained to imitate and incorporate these natural forms into their work.

==== Gallery ====
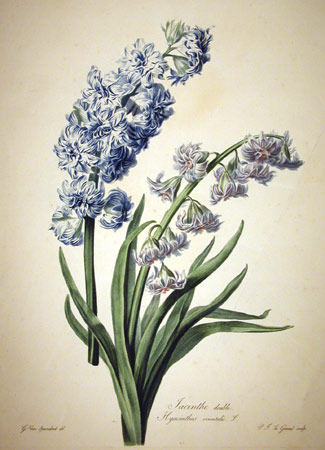
Jacinthe double by Gerard Van Spaendonck, 1800

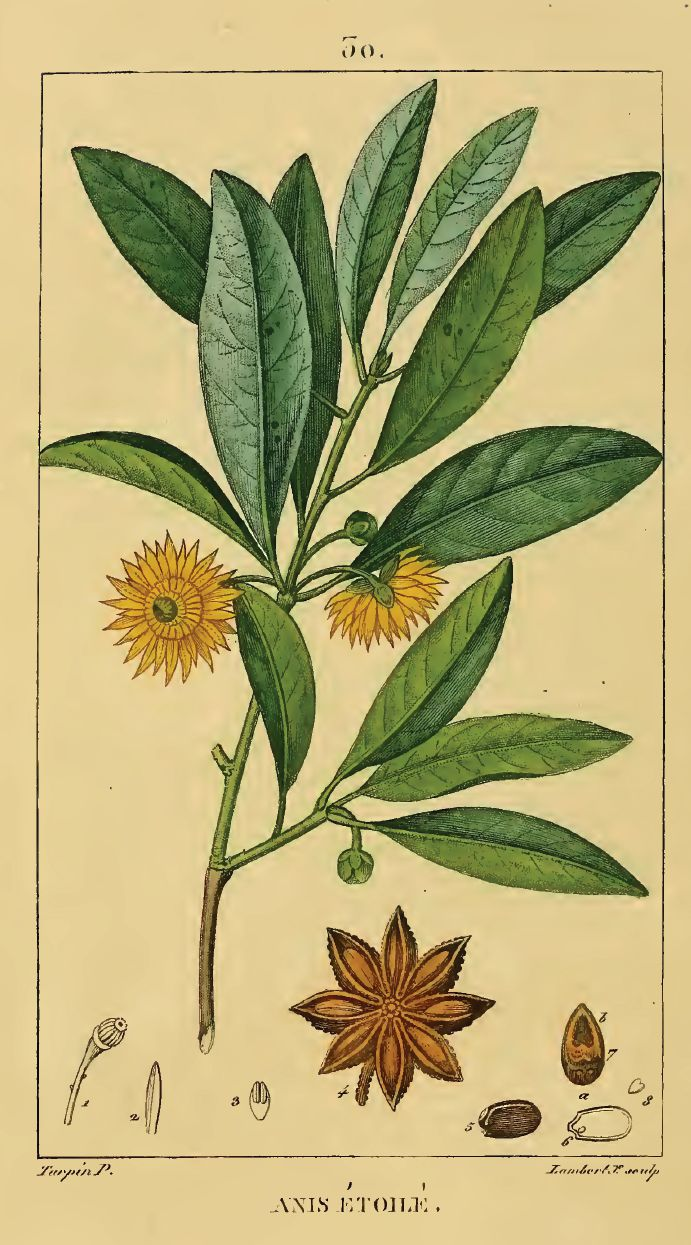
Plate from François-Pierre Chaumeton's 1833 Flore Medicale

=== 20th and 21st centuries ===
As the 19th century ended and photography gained popularity. Photoengraving, which used halftone technology instead of traditional illustration, became the primary aesthetic of the era. The first offset press was introduced in 1907, revolutionizing image reproduction.

New botanical areas of specialization emerged and developed like Ecology (Eugenius Warming), along with new fields like Cytogenetics.

Botanical illustrators are still actively working today. Deborah Lambkin, the official illustrator of new orchids described by the RHS since 2005, was awarded the Margaret Flockton Award in 2020. American botanists Nathaniel Lord Britton and Joseph Nelson Rose, with illustrator Mary Emily Eaton, published The Cactaceae (1919–1923). The prolific Matilda Smith was active until the early 1920s. Nellie Roberts was the first and longest serving Royal Horticultural Society orchid artist, from 1897 until 1953. In 1972, the Smithsonian Institution hired its first botanical illustrator, Alice Tangerini. In the 1980s, Celia Rosser undertook to illustrate every Banksia species for the masterwork, The Banksias. When another species was described after its publication, Banksia rosserae, it was named to honour her mammoth accomplishment.

New developments include American hospital radiologist Dr. Dain L. Tasker (1872–1964) making X-ray pictures of flowers in the 1930s.

The electron microscope (second half of the 20th century) made it possible to classify life into five or six kingdoms, three of which relate to botany (fungi, plants, chromista). Adolf Engler's plant classification system outlined in Syllabus der Pflanzenfamilien (1892) was later modified by the Cronquist system (1968).

Today, illustrations reveal plant structures at microscopic and molecular levels.

Field guides, floras, catalogues and magazines produced since the introduction of photography to print material have continued to include illustrations. A compromise of accuracy and idealized images from several specimens can be easily (re)produced by skilled artists. Illustrations are also at times just preferred for some print/digital audiences or text formats.

Organizations devoted to furthering botanical art are found in the US (American Society of Botanical Artists), UK (Society of Botanical Artists), Australia (Botanical Art Society of Australia), the Netherlands (Dutch Society for Botanical Artists) and South Africa (Botanical Artists Association of South Africa), among others. There is an increasing interest in the changes occurring in the natural world and in the central role plants play in maintaining healthy ecosystems. A sense of urgency has developed in documenting today's plant life for future generations. Original botanical illustrations rendered in traditional media (with which art conservators are more familiar) can and might serve as reference research materials for endangered species and climate change.

== Chinese illustrators ==
The Shennong Bencaojing, written between the first and second centuries AD, considered as the oldest book on Chinese herbal medicine, does not seem to have been illustrated originally. It was revised by Tao Hongjing's Bencao jing jizhu c.500, which was itself revised by a team of officials and physicians headed by Su Jing (599-674), also known as Su Gong (Xinxiu bencao or Tang Ben Cao or The Tang Classic of Materia Medica), a Chinese pharmacopoeia. Yaoxing lun, literally Treatise on the Nature of Medicinal Herbs, is a 7th-century treatise on herbal medicine.

André-Georges Haudricourt and Georges Métailié mention Song Boren, a poet and painter who is best known for Meihua Xishen Pu (Guide to Representing a Plum Blossom), published in 1238. This manual pairs poems with illustrations of plum blossoms at various stages, from buds to full bloom. His approach is purely artistic. On the contrary, Shen Kuo's Bencao is a book on Traditional Chinese medicine (1249).

On the other hand, the prince and botanist Zhu Su, acted to promote the welfare of his contemporaries in times of famine when he composed his Jiuhuang bencao or Famine Relief Herbal (1406). This text lists 414 edible wild plants, each with an illustration and a brief description of its appearance, pharmacological properties, and culinary uses.

Li Shizhen (1518–1593) is regarded as having been a leading scientific figure in China. For Haudricourt and Métailié, his Bencao Gangmu (1596) is comparable to similar European Renaissance works. The illustrations are not always true to life.

Bencao yuanshi (Origins of Materia Medica), by Li Zhongli, first published in 1612, focuses on plants with medicinal properties. The plants or useful parts of plants are illustrated.

Cheng Yaotian (1736-1796) observed plants in nature and cultivated them. The drawings accompanying his text resemble herbarium specimens, emphasizing flower and fruit details. Wu Qijun (1789-1847)'s Illustrated Catalogues of Plants (1848) also relied on direct observation of plants in nature.

The authors conclude that despite working in rich plant environments, scholar-officials' inventories rarely exceeded 2000 plants, much less than some European floras did in the 16th century.

== Other types of floral representations ==
=== Two-dimensional representations ===
An exhibition at the Grand Palais in 2017 displayed other types of botanical illustrations:

- Papercutting : (Philipp Otto Runge, 1777–1810). This discipline was also practised in Ottoman Turkey (17th-18th centuries), under the name of Kaat'ı (more or less similar to quilling).
- Collages: (watercolor-enhanced paper collages by Mary Delany).
- Cut-out gouaches (Acanthus by Henri Matisse), 1953.
- Wall-paper and textile designers like Joseph-Laurent Malaine and the Arthur et Robert wallpaper factory, or William Morris, who paid close attention to botanical detail in his botanical patterns (Common hollyhock, 1862).
- Ceramics, such as those from Sèvres, often feature botanical motifs, finely observed from the 18th century onward. In 1790, Frederick VI of Denmark ordered a dinner set made decorated with exact copies of the plates of Flora Danica. Loren L. Zeller notes that Jean-Baptiste Pillement also produced several collections containing exotic floral and botanical designs. This was at a time when many women loved accessories decorated with flowers (flower holders, fans, perfume dispensers such as perfume ) and floral wall hangings, wallpaper, textiles and jewels were fashionable.
- Floral marquetry : Jan van Mekeren (Tiel 1658-1733 Amsterdam) is remembered for his cabinets covered with floral marquetry representing more than ten identifiable flowers. Cabinetmaker Jean-François Oeben was renowned for his foral marquetry decorations. Martine Lefèvre suggests that the foliage and flower decor on a table by Oeben may have been inspired by Jacques Daniel Cottin's indiennes as Cottin (who Christophe-Philippe Oberkampf worked for before he founded his toile de Jouy manufacture) was his neighbour in the "cour des Princes" in the Arsenal de Paris. She also writes that Cottin had "a silk sample decorated with twisted columns and small bouquets sent from Lyon in order to copy it". The silk manufactures in Lyon employed skilled artists trained in the local "classe de fleur" (flower drawing school) or in Paris (Gobelins Manufactory). The carved decor of Louis XV furniture featured garlands of flowers, fleurettes, palmettes, and foliage, as well as seashells. The Rocaille, during the reign of Louis XV, included the use of vegetal forms (vines, leaves, flowers) intertwined in complex designs.

=== Three-dimensional representations ===
- Wax sculpture : Louis Marc Antoine Robillard d'Argentelle (1777–1828) devoted 25 years of his life to creating the Museum's "Carporama", a collection of 112 tropical wax fruits and plants made between 1803 and 1826. The collection was presented in the Museum's botanical galleries in 1829. Before him, André-Pierre Pinson (1746–1828) had made wax mushrooms inspired by engravings by Pierre Bulliard (1742–1793).
- Papier mâché molded as in the botanical models designed for use in teaching by Louis Auzoux, dating from the 1870s-1880s, now in the Musée national de l'Éducation. Papier mâché and other materials were used for the Robert and Reinhold Brendel's modèles Brendel.
- Glass : In 1886, glass artists Leopold and Rudolf Blaschka were commissioned by the Harvard Botanical Museum to create a collection of Glass Flowers.
- Flowers have inspired many jewellers. In the 19th century, at least, they relied on detailed botanical sketches. "The ... designs, made by [Octave] Loeulliard for Boucheron, were criticized for striving after the exact representation of natural forms at the expense of the actual function of the jewel,... a criticism which could equally well have been levelled at Carl Fabergé and the Art Nouveau jewellers who clearly tended to regard a piece of jewellery as a work of art rather than as a fashionable accessory". Other examples include jewels by Mellerio dits Meller (Set of jewels called Fuchsias en pluie - shower of Fuchsia flowers), circa 1830, presented at the Redouté exhibition at the Musée de la Vie romantique).

== Notable botanical illustrators ==
Notable botanical illustrators include:

- James Andrews
- George French Angas
- Claude Aubriet
- Alois Auer
- Françoise Basseporte
- Ferdinand Bauer
- Franz Bauer
- Mary Foley Benson
- Elizabeth Blackwell
- Harry Bolus
- Priscilla Susan Bury
- Olivia Marie Braida-Chiusano
- Hannah Cassels im Thurn
- Mark Catesby
- Lise Cloquet
- Gillian Condy
- Léon Camille Marius Croizat
- Dioscorides
- Catharina Helena Dörrien
- Atanasio Echeverria y Godoy
- Sydenham Edwards
- Georg Dionysius Ehret
- James Henry Emerton
- Barbara Everard
- Walter Hood Fitch
- Eliza Eve Gleadall
- Barbara Jeppe
- Martha King
- Jacques le Moyne
- Dorothy van Dyke Leake
- Cythna Letty
- Carl Axel Magnus Lindman
- Margaret Mee
- Maria Sibylla Merian
- Philippa Nikulinsky
- Marianne North
- Pierre-Joseph Redouté
- Sarah Rhodes
- Lewis Roberts
- Celia Rosser
- Ellis Rowan
- Vera Scarth-Johnson
- Ellen Isham Schutt
- Dorothea Eliza Smith
- Matilda Smith
- Lilian Snelling
- Gerard van Spaendonck
- James Sowerby
- Sydney Parkinson
- Alice Tangerini
- Frances Elizabeth Tripp
- Elizabeth Twining
- Pierre Jean François Turpin
- Ellaphie Ward-Hilhorst
- Florence Woolward

== Awards ==
The Linnean Society of London awards the Jill Smythies Award for botanical illustration.

== See also ==
- Florilegium
- Still life
- List of florilegia and botanical codices
- List of American botanical illustrators
- List of Australian botanical illustrators
- List of Irish botanical illustrators
- Illustration
- Stuttgart Database of Scientific Illustrators
