= Johann Wilhelm Weinmann =

German botanist (1683–1741)

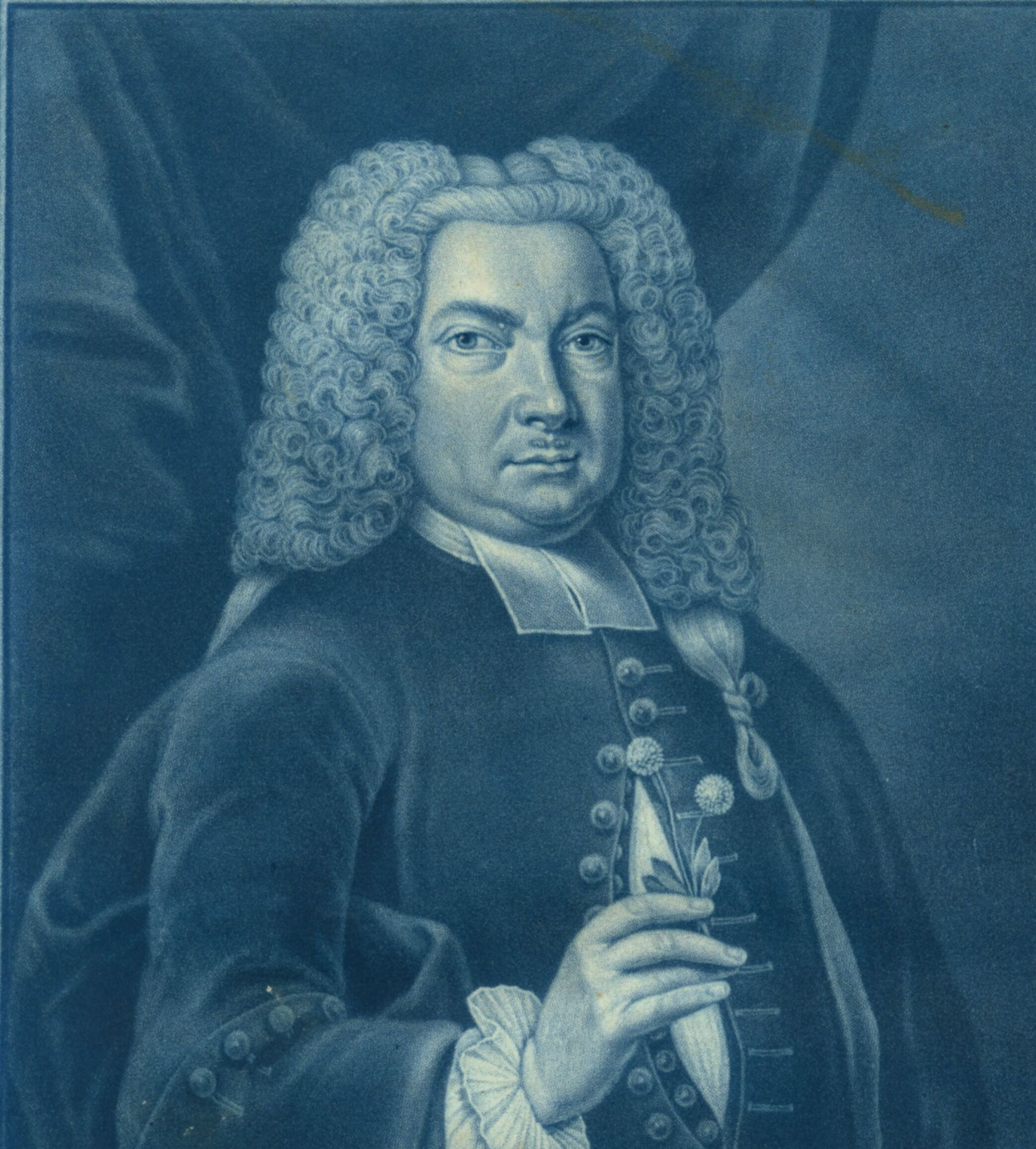
- Mezzotint, c. 1737
- Born: March 13, 1683; Gardelegen, Germany
- Died: March 1741 (aged 57–58)
- Occupations: apothecary, botanist

Johann Wilhelm Weinmann (13 March 1683 – March 1741), apothecary and botanist, is noted for his creation of the florilegium Phytanthoza iconographia between 1737 and 1745, an ambitious project which resulted in eight folio volumes with more than 1,000 hand-coloured engravings of several thousand plants. The work is thought to have inspired similar works, such as the Japanese medicinal work "Honzo Zufu" (1828) by Iwasaki Tsunemasa, and "Somoku-dzusetsu" (1856) by Yokusai Iinuma.

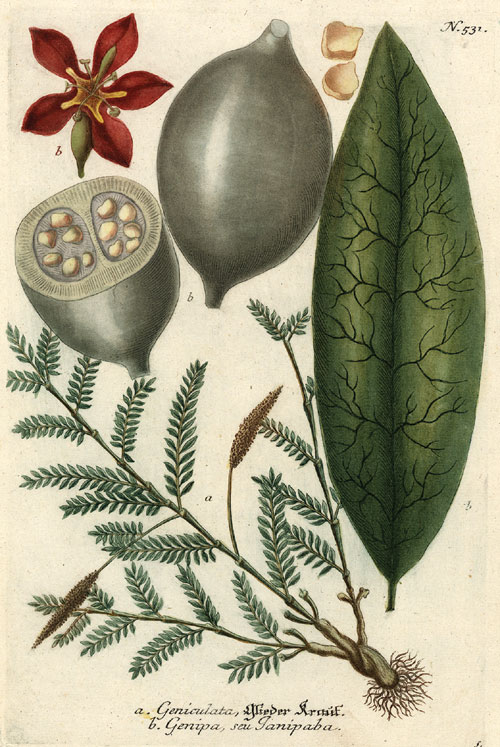
Plate from "Phytanthoza iconographia" showing Geniculata and Genipa americana

He was born in Gardelegen son of the barber, Matthias Christian Weinmann. What is known of his early life is that he settled in Regensburg, or Ratisbon as it was known in 1710, and found work as the assistant of an apothecary. Weinmann prospered in Regensburg so that he was able in 1712 to purchase a house and apothecary shop. His wife, Isabella Catharina Fürst, was the daughter of an affluent wine merchant. In 1732, shortly after the death of Isabella, he was married again, on this occasion to Christine Catharina Pfaffenreuther, daughter of a town official. His business acumen was such that he was able to purchase an apothecary which had gone bankrupt, and turn it into a profitable shop.

After his first marriage, Weinmann became embroiled in a drawn-out dispute with local apothecaries and physicians, brought about by his appointment in 1713 as Hospital Apothecary. The dispute was only resolved in 1715 with the intervention of the Town Council. Weinmann was reprimanded and his adversaries were instructed not to trouble him. Weinmann soon resumed his successful career, becoming a town councillor in 1722, a commercial assessor in 1725, and a city assessor in 1733. His business interests flourished, allowing him the freedom to indulge in his pursuit of botany. He created a botanical garden in Regensburg, published the Catalogus Alphabetico ordine exhibens Pharmaca in 1723 and contributed botanical notes as "Observationes und Anmerkungen" in the "Breslauer Sammlungen".

Weinmann employed the youthful Georg Dionysius Ehret as illustrator, who used a newly developed printing process involving mezzotint, which allowed greater detail and shading, and was finished by hand-colouring. Seuter and Ridinger turned out the first volumes, while Johann Jakob Haid managed the later volumes. Because Phytanthoza iconographia was to become Ehret's first published work, he set about the project with great enthusiasm. After the first 500 plates, Ehret realised that he was receiving a miserly payment and soon found new employment copying plates, while being able to produce other paintings independently.

Johann Georg Nicolaus Dieterichs (1681–1737) wrote the botanical text for the first twenty-five plates, and was succeeded by his son Ludwig Michael Dieterichs (1716–1747). The work was completed after Weinmann's death by Ambrosius Karl Bieler (1693–1747).

Phytanthoza iconographia is highly regarded for the quality of its colour plates, and the accuracy of its images compared with previous herbals. Weinmann was greatly respected for his writings on medicinal plants and herbs, and Phytanthoza iconographia is recognised as the first important botanical work to use colour engraved prints. The plates for this work were by the engravers Bartholomew Seuter, Johann Elias Ridinger (1698–1767), and Johann Jakob Haid (1704–1767), and were printed using a process invented by Seuter. The descriptions for plates 1-73 were provided by Johann Georg Nicolaus Dieterichs (1681–1737), for plates 76-525 by Ludwig Michael Dieterichs (1716–1769) and Ambrosius Karl Bieler. In 1730 Georg Dionys Ehret (1708–1770) added some drawings, while Herman Boerhaave and Johann Burmann compiled an index for the work.

== Sources ==
- Missouri Botanical Garden

== See also ==
- List of florilegia and botanical codices

== Links ==
- Phytanthoza Iconographia online
