= Sarah Rhodes =

British botanic artist

- Born: 1787; Leeds, England
- Died: 1862 (aged 74–75); Roundhay, England
- Known for: Botanical art
- Spouse: Stephen Nicholson
- Parent(s): Matthew Rhodes and Mary Smith

Sarah Rhodes (1787 in Leeds – 1862 in Roundhay, Leeds), was an English amateur botanical artist who used watercolours and gouache on vellum to produce unusual plant images.

Rhodes was the second daughter of Matthew Rhodes (1751–1802), a wool merchant from Campfield in Leeds, and Mary Smith who were married on 27 October 1785 in St Peters, Leeds. Mary Smith died on 18 December 1826 in Campfield.

On 1 December 1807 in Leeds, Rhodes married a banker, Stephen Nicholson (1779 Chapel Allerton – 23 February 1858 Roundhay), son of William Nicholson and Grace Whitaker, who inherited Roundhay Park and Chapel Allerton estates on 8 February 1833 after the death of his older half-brother Thomas' widow. Thomas had also been a banker in Leeds and London, and was the son of William Nicholson and his first wife, Hannah Slater. After Rhodes's death in 1862, the property was left to Nicholson's nephew's widow and children. A dispute amongst the heirs led to the estate's being sold to the city.

== Gallery ==
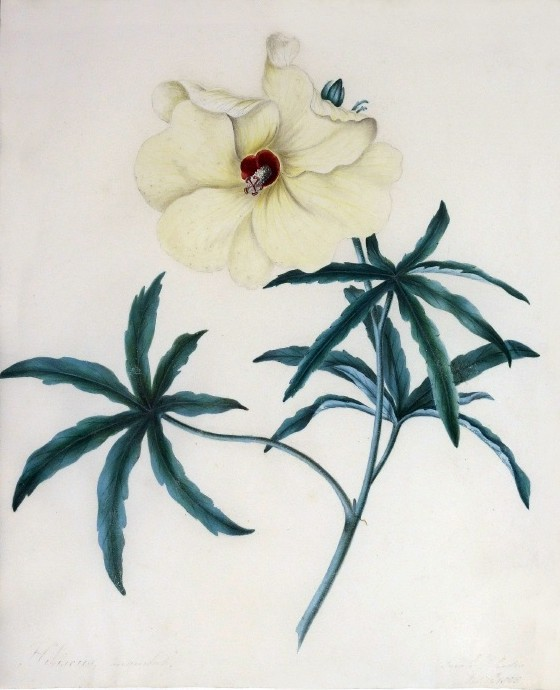
Hibiscus sp.

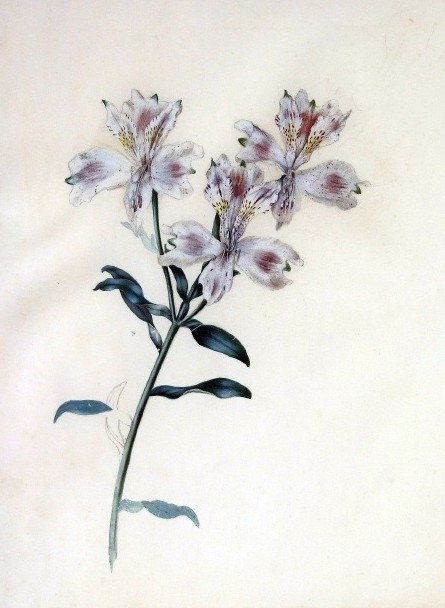
Alstroemeria sp.

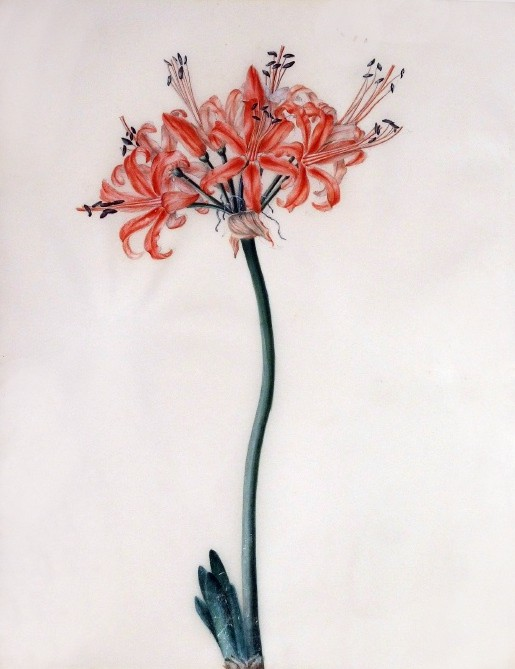
Lily
