= Lise Cloquet =

French botanical painter

- Born: 1788
- Died: 1860 (aged 71–72)
- Known for: botanical painting

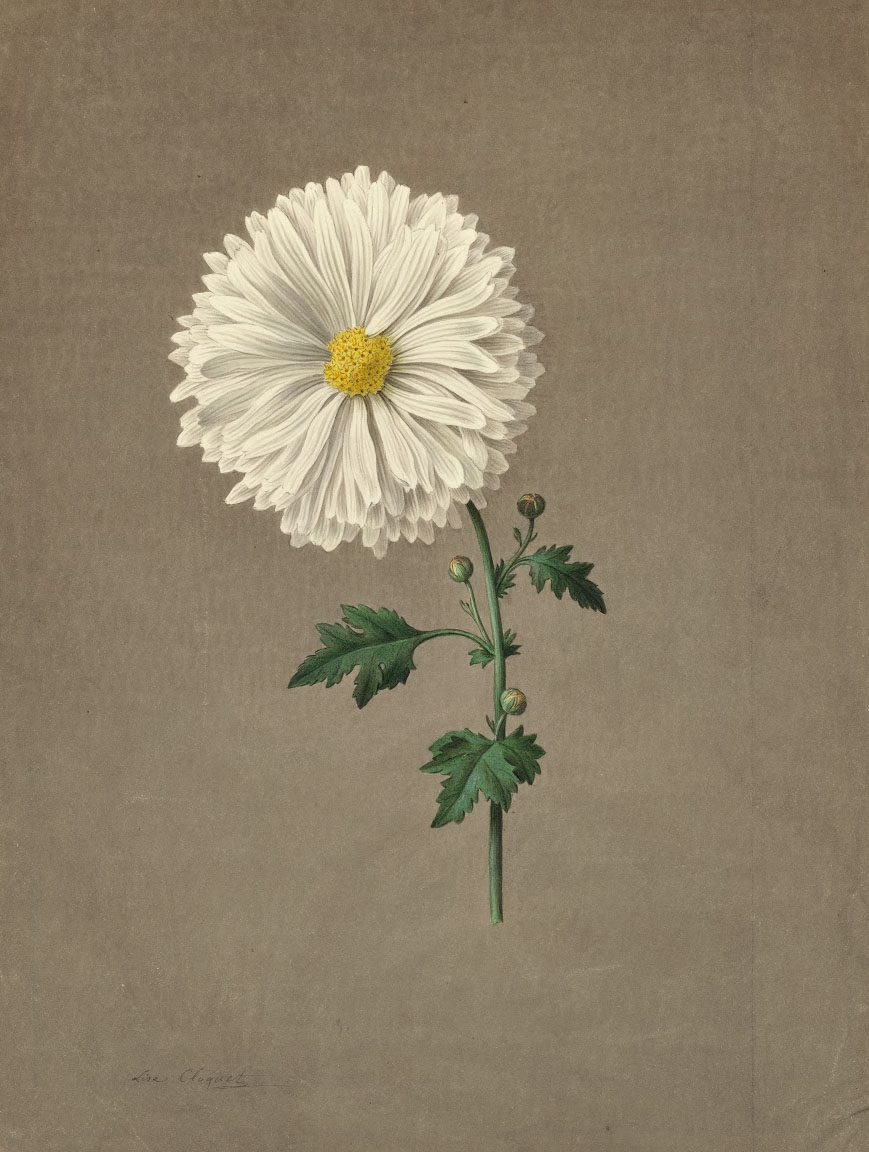
Mums, Chrysanths, 1820

Lise Cloquet (also known as Anne-Louise Cloquet; 1788 (Paris) –30 October 1860 (Paris)) was a French botanical painter.

Cloquet was taught to draw by her father and was influenced by the botanical illustrator Pierre-Joseph Redouté.

32 of her works, including one of a white chrysanthemum, from 1820 are currently housed at the Oak Spring Garden Foundation in Upperville, Virginia.

== Family ==
Her father, Jean-Baptiste-Antoine Cloquet, was an illustrator and engraver. Her brother, Jules Cloquet, was a doctor.
