= Barbara Everard =

British painter

Barbara Mary Steyning Everard
- Born: 27 July 1910; Telscombe Manor, Sussex, England
- Died: 17 June 1990 (aged 79)
- Known for: Botanical art

Barbara Mary Steyning Everard (27 July 1910 – 17 June 1990) was a botanical illustrator whose work encompassed books, private commissions, botanical publications, gardening magazines, greetings cards and commemorative plates.

== Early life ==
Barbara Beard was born as the eldest daughter of three to Charles and Rosalie Beard at Telscombe Manor, near Brighton, Sussex on 27 July 1910.

In 1936, Barbara obtained work at a fake antique business in Deans Yard in Soho, London, owned by Ernest and Walter Thornton-Smith. Here, while others copied Canalettos and minute Chinese mirror paintings, she learned the art of making fake Chinese wallpapers. Paid 30 shillings a week as a beginner, she soon rose to a senior position, being commissioned to work at Fortnum and Masons to do murals, decorate teatables and a curtain for the new Dominion Theatre in Tottenham Court Road, and touch up furniture, fabrics and gilding in the homes of the wealthy. The training she received, together with night classes at Ealing School of Art, contributed to her botanical watercolour work in later life.

During the Great Depression, work dried up. In 1938, while working as a lady's companion to Lady Davis at Chilham Castle, Kent, Barbara married in secret to Raymond Wallace Everard. Shortly after their wedding her husband was appointed to an assistant-manager's job in Singapore, then part of Malaya. However, he had not told his employers he was married so Barbara was forced to stay in England, only joining him when the pressure of separation grew too much.

== Malaya and the Second World War ==
With the outbreak of war in Europe, the couple felt that it was time to have a child. A son, Martin, was born on 7 July 1940. In February 1942, Singapore fell to the Japanese and Raymond, having joined the Malacca Volunteer Force, was taken prisoner. Barbara and Martin escaped on the last boat, the SS Duchess of Bedford to successfully evade the Japanese and returned safely to England.

Raymond survived three and a half years of being a prisoner of war, being forced to work on the Burma Railway and the infamous Bridge on the River Kwai. After a short repatriation to England to recuperate he returned to Malaya to help open up rubber plantations for Dunlop. Barbara and Martin sailed on the RMS Mauretania to join him in 1946. While living on the rubber estates around Malacca, Barbara began collecting and painting tropical plants and orchids. Estate bungalows were large, ill-decorated and with bare walls, so inspired by a friend she started painting large watercolour still lifes to fill the empty spaces. She began to exhibit at flower shows in Singapore, Malacca and Kuala Lumpur, expanding her collection of living plants and her portfolio.

== Career as a botanical illustrator ==
Barbara returned to England with her husband in 1952, Martin having been sent to boarding school three years earlier. On her return she exhibited a collection of studies of Malayan orchids at the Royal Horticulture Hall in Vincent Square, London, and was awarded the first Grenfell Gold Medal. At later Royal Horticultural Society exhibitions she would be awarded many more.

For the next thirty years Barbara Everard embarked on a career as a commercial botanical artist, completing many private commissions of floral paintings together with illustrations on a number of coffee table books, botanical publications, gardening magazines, greetings cards and commemorative plates. One of these commissions was for Mr John Gurney at the Medici Society to paint the studies of wild flowers of Britain, a task that took ten years and resulted in around 950 plates being completed. This work, designed to be a companion to the Bentham & Hooker's Field Guide, has never been published. She also added to the family with the birth of a second son, Anthony, in 1963.

In 1975, with a Winston Churchill Travelling Fellowship, Barbara travelled back to Malaysia to create botanical paintings of endangered plant species, including the Rafflesia on Mount Kinabalu, and on completion of the project, was made a Lifetime Member of the Trust.

By the time of her death on 17 June 1990, Barbara had become one of the world's leading botanical artists.

A number of paintings and drawings have been donated to various botanical societies including some 250 plates and sketches given to the Library and Archive at the Royal Botanic Gardens, Kew. The centenary of her birth was celebrated with an exhibition of some of her work dating from the 1950s to the 1980s at the RHS Botanic Art exhibition in March 2011, together with the publication of her autobiography, Call Them the Happy Years.

== Selected bibliography ==
- Wild Flowers of the World by Brian D Morley and published by Rainbird (1974)
- Trees and Bushes of Europe and Flowers of Europe - a Field Guide by Oleg Polunin, both published by Oxford University Press
- Flowers of the Mediterranean by Oleg Polunin and Anthony Huxley, published by Chatto and Windus.
- Call Them the Happy Years by Barbara Everard, transcribed and edited by Martin Everard, pub. FastPrint (Peterborough ), 2011 ISBN 978-1-84426-987-7
