= Eliza Eve Gleadall =

English botanical illustrator (1806–1887)

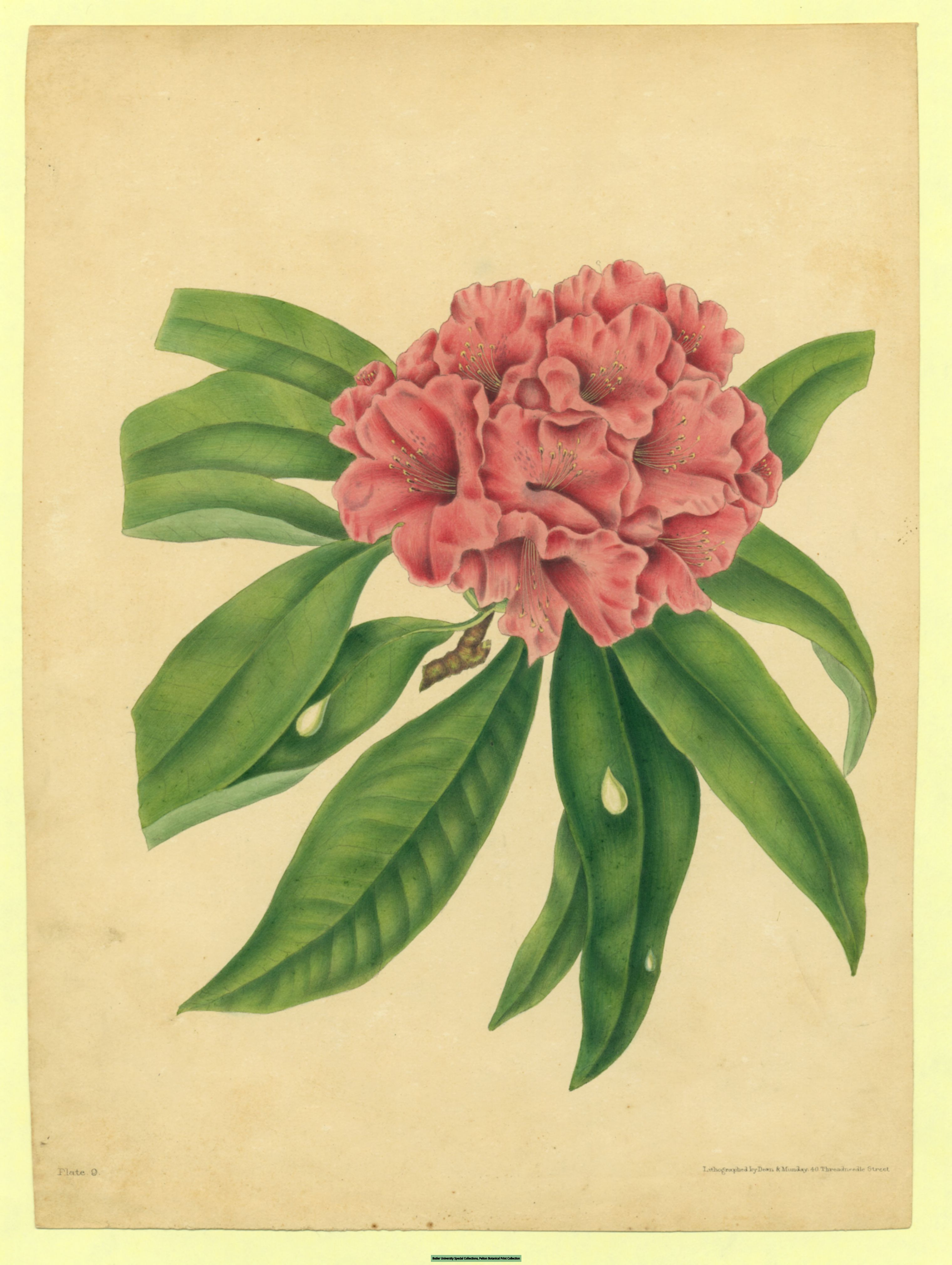
Rhodedendron illustration by Gleadall

Eliza Eve Gleadall (1806–1887) was an English botanical illustrator and headmistress. She was the author of Beauties of Flora, a collection of lithographs of rare plants.

== Life ==
Gleadall was born in 1806 in Lincolnshire. By 1831, she was teaching at Heath Old Hall ladies’ seminary in Wakefield, where she became headmistress. The school taught subjects including grammar, history, languages, music, drawing, dancing, geography and astronomy.

== Illustration ==
In 1834–7, she published a book of floral illustrations, Beauties of Flora, by subscription. The book recorded the exotic plants being grown in the hothouses of local aristocrats in folio-sized lithographs. She was mentored by botanist Samuel Curtis so as to make botanically accurate drawings, which were accompanied by botanical and poetic reflections, notes on the religious symbolism of the plants, and instructions for how to colour them. Subscribers to the book included the Duchess Dowager of Newcastle and the Earl of Mexborough.

== Later life ==
In 1838, she married Benjamin Williamson. They had three children, and she gained four stepchildren from his previous marriage. He died in 1854.

Mrs Williamson then set up another ladies’ seminary in Beech Grove, Harrogate, which she ran until her death in 1887.

== Legacy ==
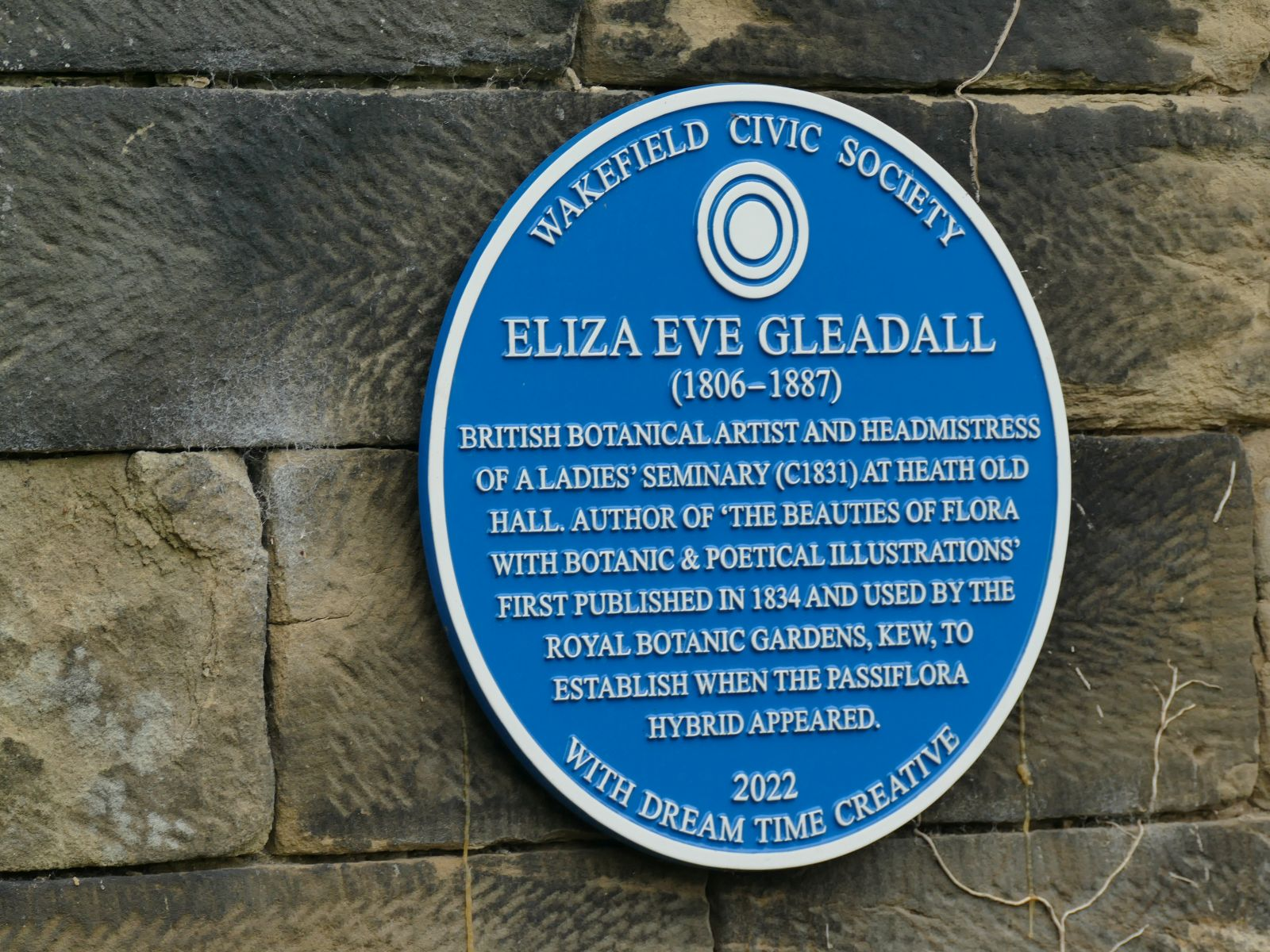
Gleadall's blue plaque in Wakefield

A blue plaque commemorating Gleadall was unveiled in Wakefield in 2022.
