= Roccabonella Herbal =

One of Amadio's full-page illustrations

The Roccabonella Herbal is an illustrated herbal from the mid-15th century. It has the shelfmark Venice, Biblioteca Nazionale Marciana, Lat. VI, 59 [coll. 2548]. Entitled Liber de simplicibus, the text is a compendium of 450 local and 111 exotic herbs with 440 illustrations. It gives the name of each herb in Latin, Greek, Arabic and various Italian and Slavic languages.

The text was compiled by the Venetian physician Nicolò Roccabonella (1386–1459). The illustrations are by Andrea Amadio. The author was formerly identified as Benedetto Rinio (1485–1565), a Venetian physician and pharmacist. Rinio's name appears in the book as its owner as of 1563.
