= Barbara Jeppe =

South African botanical illustrator (1921–1999)

- Born: 21 May 1921; Pilgrim's Rest, South Africa
- Died: 20 June 1999 (aged 78); Johannesburg, South Africa
- Citizenship: South African
- Occupation: Botanical artist.
- Known for: Her first book, Trees and Shrubs of the Witwatersrand (Witwatersrand University Press) with which she made her mark in the field of botanical art.
- Spouse: Carl Louis Jeppe
- Children: 4
- Parents: Victor Brereton (father); Gladys Evans (mother)
- Awards: The Cythna Letty Gold medal for contributions to botanical illustrations in South Africa Gold medal by the South African Nurserymen's Association Silver medal by Transvaal Horticultural Society

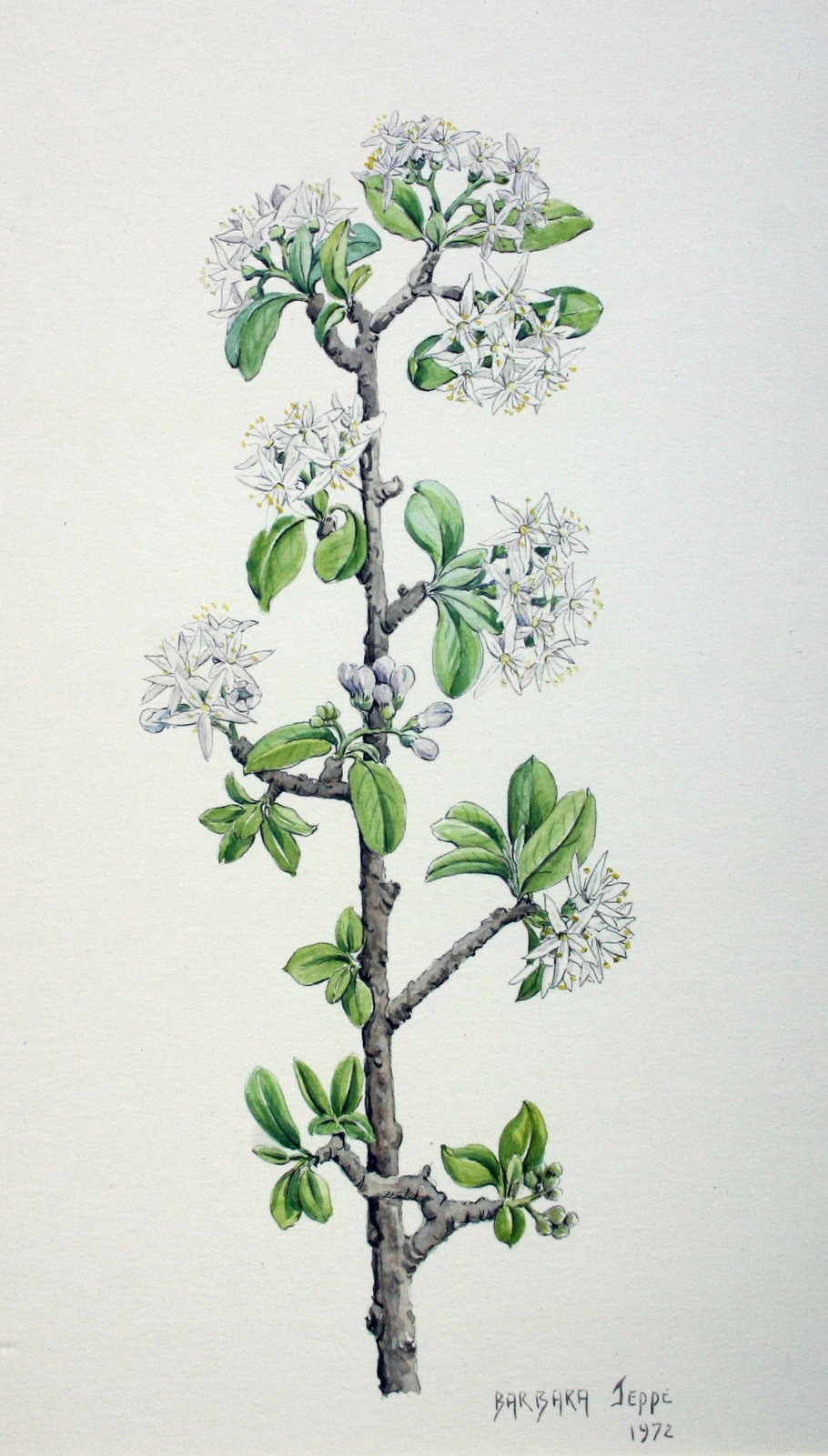
Ehretia rigida

Barbara Jeppe (21 May 1921 – 20 June 1999) was a South African botanical artist. Born in the mining town of Pilgrim's Rest, she was the daughter of Victor Brereton, a land-surveyor, and Gladys Evans. At an early age her mother introduced her to the world of wild flowers.

She was married to Carl Louis Jeppe, a psychiatrist. The couple had four children, Leigh, Marie, Carl and David. Twenty years into her marriage, she illustrated her first book, Trees and Shrubs of the Witwatersrand (Witwatersrand University Press) with which she made her mark in the field of botanical art.

Over a period of three years she spent a year in the Cape, illustrating and writing the text for her book on Cape bulbs. This passion for bulbs resulted in the publication of the Spring and Winter Flowering Bulbs of the Western Cape (Oxford University Press, 1989). Her definitive work on Amaryllidaceae was published in 2017 by Kew Publishing with additional illustrations by her daughter, Leigh Voigt, and text by Graham Duncan.

Besides her botanical paintings, Barbara Jeppe had a great love for butterflies and painted many for friends and family. She also occasionally ventured into painting landscapes.

She was awarded two gold medals in 1990, one by the Botanical Society of South Africa, the Cythna Letty Gold medal for contributions to botanical illustrations in South Africa, and another by the South African Nurserymen's Association. The Transvaal Horticultural Society bestowed on her a silver medal in 1991.

She died at the age of 78 in Johannesburg from complications after contracting pneumonia.

== Books illustrated ==
- Trees and Shrubs of the Witwatersrand (Witwatersrand University Press) ISBN 0-85494-236-X
- South African Aloes (Purnell, 1974)
- Natal Wild Flowers (Purnell, 1975) ISBN 0-360-00203-X
- Effective Weed Control in Maize and Grain Shorghum (Ciba-Geigy, 1975)
- Namaqualand (Purnell, 1976)
- Acacias, a Field Guide to the Identification of the Species of Southern Africa - Lynette Davidson (Centaur, 1981) ISBN 0-620-05609-6
- South Africa is My Garden (Delta Books, 1984) ISBN 0-908387-48-2
- Cycads of South Africa - Cynthia Giddy (Struik, 1984) ISBN 0-86977-195-7
- Weeds of Crops and Gardens in Southern Africa (Ciba-Geigy, 1985)
- Spring and Winter Flowering Bulbs of the Cape - Graham Duncan (Oxford University Press, Cape Town, 1989)
- Irises (Umdaus Press, 1999) ISBN 1-919766-11-1
- Amaryllidaceae (Kew Publishing, 2017) with additional illustrations by her daughter, Leigh Voigt, and text by Graham Duncan.
