= Dorothy van Dyke Leake =

American botanist, artist, educator

Dorothy Lois Van Dyke Leake
- Born: Dorothy Van Dyke; September 6, 1893; Columbus Junction, Iowa
- Died: July 23, 1990 (aged 96); Aurora, Missouri
- Education: Drury College; University of Oklahoma
- Occupations: botanist, botanical illustrator, educator
- Spouse: Harold Henderson Leake
- Children: Two
- Father: Benjamin Franklin Van Dyke

Dorothy Van Dyke Leake (September 6, 1893 – July 23, 1990) was an American botanist, botanical illustrator, educator, writer and conservationist. In retirement, she became known for her efforts to preserve the Crane Creek area in northwest Stone County, Missouri.

== Life and work ==
Dorothy Van Dyke was born in Columbus Junction, Iowa, to lawyer Benjamin Franklin and Fannie Fern Van Dyke, who moved their family to Granite, Oklahoma, in 1900. She returned to Missouri to earn her bachelor's degree in biology in 1914 from Drury College in Springfield, and received her master's degree the following year at the same college.

In June 1919, she married Harold Henderson Leake after his return from deployment for service in World War I. They had met while both were studying at Drury College. The couple moved to a 131-acre Missouri property that her father, Benjamin Van Dyke, had bought for them in 1920. Their property included the headwaters of Crane Creek, and it would become the focal point of the activities of the couple and their two children, Marcelotte and John.

Leake served as head of named head of the chemistry and biology department from 1927 through 1933 at Monett Junior College.

In about 1937, she began work on her PhD at the University of Oklahoma, completing it in 1944. Throughout her life, she taught biology at several institutions, including Phillips University, Southeastern State Teachers College, University of Oklahoma, Central Missouri State Teachers College, Jefferson City Junior College, and Oklahoma Agricultural and Mechanical College. In 1948, she returned to Southeastern State Teachers College as the head of the biology department until 1959 when she retired.

=== Illustrations ===
An accomplished botanical illustrator, she provided pen-and-ink artwork for Ruth Nelson's 1969 Handbook of Rocky Mountain Plants. In 1972, the Hunt Institute for Botanical Documentation at Carnegie Mellon University chose Leake's illustrations for the Third International Exhibition of Botanical Art and Illustration. In 1993, her final book, Desert and Mountain Plants of the Southwest, was published posthumously featuring text by her two children and Leake's illustrations.

=== Awards ===
Leake received the Distinguished Alumni Award from Drury College in 1982, and the Ellen Swallow Richards Award in 1985. In 1989, Drury College awarded her an honorary doctorate degree.

== Works ==
- Leake, Dorothy Vandyke (1944). The Algae of Crystal Lake, Cleveland county, Oklahoma. OCLC 25842135. – PhD Dissertation
- Nelson, Ruth Ashton (1977). Handbook of Rocky Mountain plants. Skyland Pub. ISBN 9780912762081. OCLC 3527913. - Illustrator
- Leake, Henderson; Leake, Dorothy (1981). Wildflowers of the Ozarks. Ozark Society Foundation. OCLC 7792707.
- Leake, Dorothy Van Dycke; Leake, John Benjamin; Roeder, Marcelotte Leake (1993). Desert and mountain plants of the Southwest. University of Oklahoma Press. ISBN 9780806124896. OCLC 729642657.
