= Dutch Society for Botanical Artists =

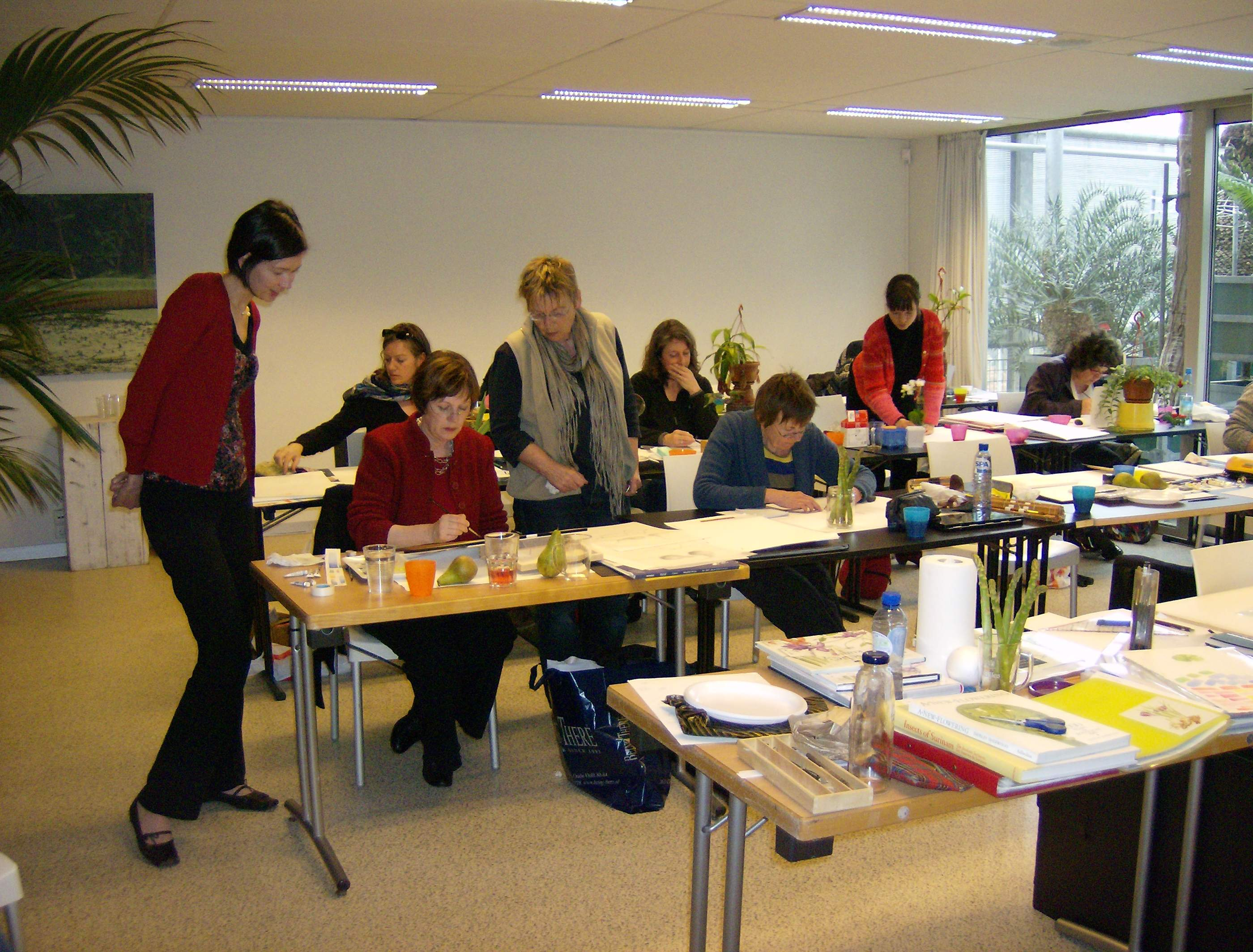
A workshop of the Dutch Society for Botanical Artists in 2011

The Dutch Society for Botanical Artists (Vereniging van Botanisch Kunstenaars Nederland), further referred to as “VBKN”, is the Dutch society which brings together botanical artists and is dedicated to enhancing the quality of work and to promoting the public awareness of botanical illustration in the Netherlands. The society honors the tradition of botanical art and aims at furthering its development. It organizes many exhibitions, workshops, master classes, lectures, annual excursions, maintains contact with other international societies for botanical artists and brings the work of the members to the public attention. The VBKN was established on the 12th of April 2006 by Jacomien van Andel, Ria van Elk, Margriet Honingh, Hanneke Jelles, Sigrid Frensen, Jan van Os and Anita Walsmit Sachs. With already a 150 members in 2011, the society celebrated its 5th anniversary.

== Expositions ==
VBKN has participated in expositions of botanical art:

- 2015: Botanical art, in the Noordbrabants Museum
- 2023: Uitgelicht, in the Botanical garden, Utrecht University. This exposition obtained the Joke ´t Hart Award.

== See also ==
- Botanical illustrator
- Hortus Botanicus Leiden
- Leiden University
- Naturalis
