= Olivia Marie Braida-Chiusano =

American artist and author (born 1948)

Olivia Marie Braida-Chiusano (born 1948) is an American botanical artist, author, and educator.

== Business career ==
Raised in New York City, Braida-Chiusano attend Walton High School. She graduated from Empire College of the State University of New York where she received a Bachelor of Science degree in Business and Art. In 1980, Braida-Chiusano and her husband, John Chiusano, opened Master Messenger Inc., a messenger service in White Plains, New York. In 1987, the company was named a "Westchester Winner," one of the fastest growing small to mid-size companies in Westchester County, New York, recognized by the Westchester Small Business Council of the County Chamber of Commerce and the Federal Small Business Administration.

The company garnered six Business-of-the-Year awards, and in 1987 Olivia, as president of the company, was named Woman Entrepreneur of the Year. In 1993, the Chiusanos sold the company.

== Art career ==
Braida-Chiusano took a course of study from New York Botanical Garden, where she received a Certificate in Botanical Art and Illustration in 1995. She also traveled to Europe for intensive study of original botanical art by masters, working with Master Painter and Instructor Anne Marie Evans over a period of two years. In 1997 she studied the original botanical drawings and paintings of Ferdinand & Franz Bauer at the Natural History Museum, London, and the original fruit paintings of William Hooker at the Lindley Library in London. In 2000, she visited Europe again to examine first-hand the Botanical Style of the French Court at the Bibliothèque Centrale du Muséum national d'histoire naturelle, including original botanical works on Vellum-the Vélins du Roi (Kings' Velum Paintings) by artists such as Daniel Rabel, Nicolai Robert, Claude Aubriet, Gerard Van Spaendonck, Pierre-Joseph Redouté, Pancrace Bessa. During this time, Braida Chiusano increased her participation in solo, museum, gallery, and garden exhibitions and her work exhibited in major collections and museums.

In 1997, under the pen name of O.M. Braida, Braida-Chiusano copyrighted the O. M. Braida Matrix Theory, based on the concepts of geometric perspective developed in Renaissance Art. In 1998, she designed, and trademarked the PERPLEXI, an artist grid-drawing tool used to explain dimensional concepts.

Braida-Chiusano opened her first teaching studio in New York City, "Studio 64," where she taught classes on Botanical Art. She also taught classes at the New York Botanical Gardens, and in other locations that have included Vermont and France. In 1999, Braida-Chiusano began teaching botanical art classes for Ringling College of Art and Design. She was hired to create a Botanical Art & Illustration Certificate Program for this college in 2002 and taught her program there until 2011. As study guides, she created fourteen textbooks and fifteen supporting course-packs.

In 2004, Braida-Chiusano began teaching at the Marie Selby Botanical Gardens in Sarasota, Florida, when she established the Academy of Botanical Art, and began offering her program to both local and distance learners. In 2008, she also began offering classes in Lexington, Kentucky, at the University of Kentucky Arboretum.

By 2010, the Academy of Botanical Art became the official botanical art school of the Marie Selby Botanical Gardens, and the Gardens became the certifying body to graduate students. Braida-Chiusano's books are the basis for her program, which attracts students from various parts of the world. The work of Olivia Marie Braida-Chiusano now hangs in the permanent collection of three United States Museums: The Hunt Institute for Botanical Documentation, the South Florida Museum, and The Museum of Botany and the Arts at the Marie Selby Botanical Garden. In addition, she created ink illustrations for the Marie Selby Botanical Gardens. The artist also was commissioned to do plant portraits for the Theodore W. Kheel Conference Center in Punta Cana, Dominican Republic, as part of a study on biodiversity and medicinal plants, encouraged by Cornell University. Braida-Chiusano is a member of the Copley Society of Art and continues to create and exhibit art.

== Publication of art ==
- 2020: Selby Gardens commissions two orchid paintings to be part of their 45th Anniversary Orchid Show: Women Breaking the Glasshouse Ceiling held at The Marie Selby Botanical Gardens
- 2016: Selby Gardens commissions Brazilian Bromeliad Dwellers for the permanent collection of its Museum of Botany and The Arts in Sarasota, Florida
- 2014: Watercolor painting Magnolia Grandiflora Little Gem #2 exhibited alongside ImogenCunningham's art for Duets exhibit at The Hunt Institute for Botanical Documentation at Carnegie Mellon University in Pittsburgh, Pennsylvania.
- 2013: Collaborated with the South Florida Museum to coordinate Fine Art Botanicals by O.M.Braida and Aspects of Art by Braida's former student Julia Rega.
- 2013: Awarded a Best in Show award for original watercolor Expectations at the AnnualCommunity Juried Exhibition at the Longboat Key Center for the Arts in Sarasota, Florida
- 2013: Art Center Sarasota 2013 Art Calendar sponsored by Boar's Head. Produced by Jeffrey Weisman. Designed and Printed by Precision Litho Service. Inc.
- 2008: Today's Botanical Artists by Cora Marcus and Libby Kyer.
- 2006-8: Natural Selections in Sarasota Magazine. Published full page O.M. Braida Watercolor Paintings from October 2006 to December 2008.
- 2006 International Waterlily and Water Gardening Society. Water Garden Journal. 4th Quarter, 2006. Volume 21, Number 4. Back Cover Image: Nelumbo 'Baby Doll' Dwarf White Lotus watercolor by O.M. Braida
- 2006 International Waterlily and Water Gardening Society. Water Garden Journal. 4th Quarter, 2006. Volume 21, Number 4. Back Cover Image: Nelumbo 'Baby Doll' Dwarf White Lotus watercolor by O.M. Braida
- 2007 Hunt Institute for Botanical Documentation Bibliography of Botanical Art & Literature by James White

11th International Exhibition of Botanical Art & Illustration. Hunt Institute/Carnegie Mellon. Oct 2004 Catalog By James J. White.

- 2002: Woman's Day Gardening & Outdoor Living
- 2001: His Grace Lives On by Kirpal Singh. Color Plate of Art page viii and end covers, B&W Floral decoration on chapter headings on Hardcover edition.
