= Catherine Perrot =

French painter

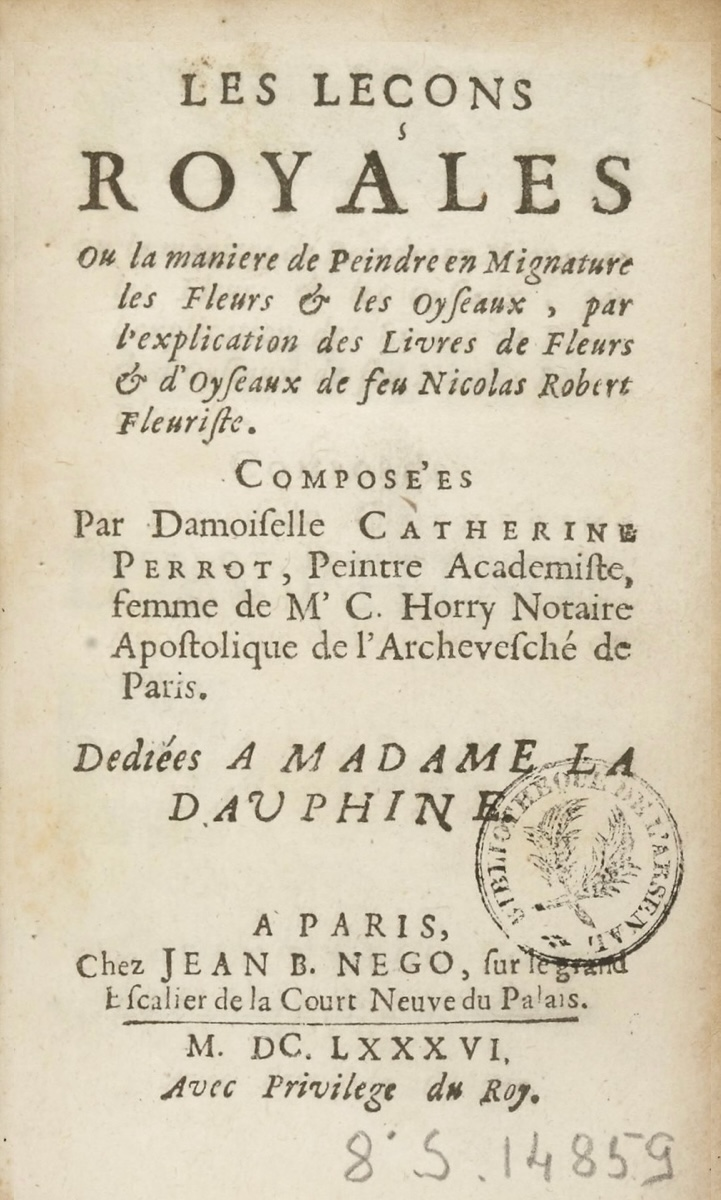
Les Leçons royales by Catherine Perrot

Catherine Perrot (1655–1695) was a French miniature painter specialising in flowers and animals. A pupil of the court artist Nicolas Robert, she became one of the few women admitted to the Royal Academy of Painting and Sculpture in the seventeenth century and was also the author of treatises on miniature painting.

== Life ==
Catherine Perrot was born in March 1655, the daughter of a Parisian bourgeois. She studied painting under Charles Le Brun and Nicolas Robert, the latter a leading royal flower painter. On 31 January 1682, Perrot was formally received into the Académie royale de peinture et de sculpture as a flower painter, becoming the seventh of only fifteen women admitted in the institution’s history. Her Académie records include the remark, ce sans tirer à conséquence, indicating that her acceptance was exceptional and not intended to set a precedent for the admission of other women.

After many years developing her craft, Perrot established herself as a prominent miniature painter, authoring treatises on the subject and providing instruction to members of the French royal family, including the niece of Louis XIV, Marie-Louise d'Orléans.

Perrot married twice. Her first husband was Georges Charvet, with whom she had a son, Jacques Charvet, born in 1680. She later married Claude Horry, a Parisian notary, on 12 May 1679; the couple lived on Rue de la Barillerie, near the Palais de Justice in Paris.

Catherine Perrot died on 13 December 1695 and was buried the following day.

== Artistic career ==
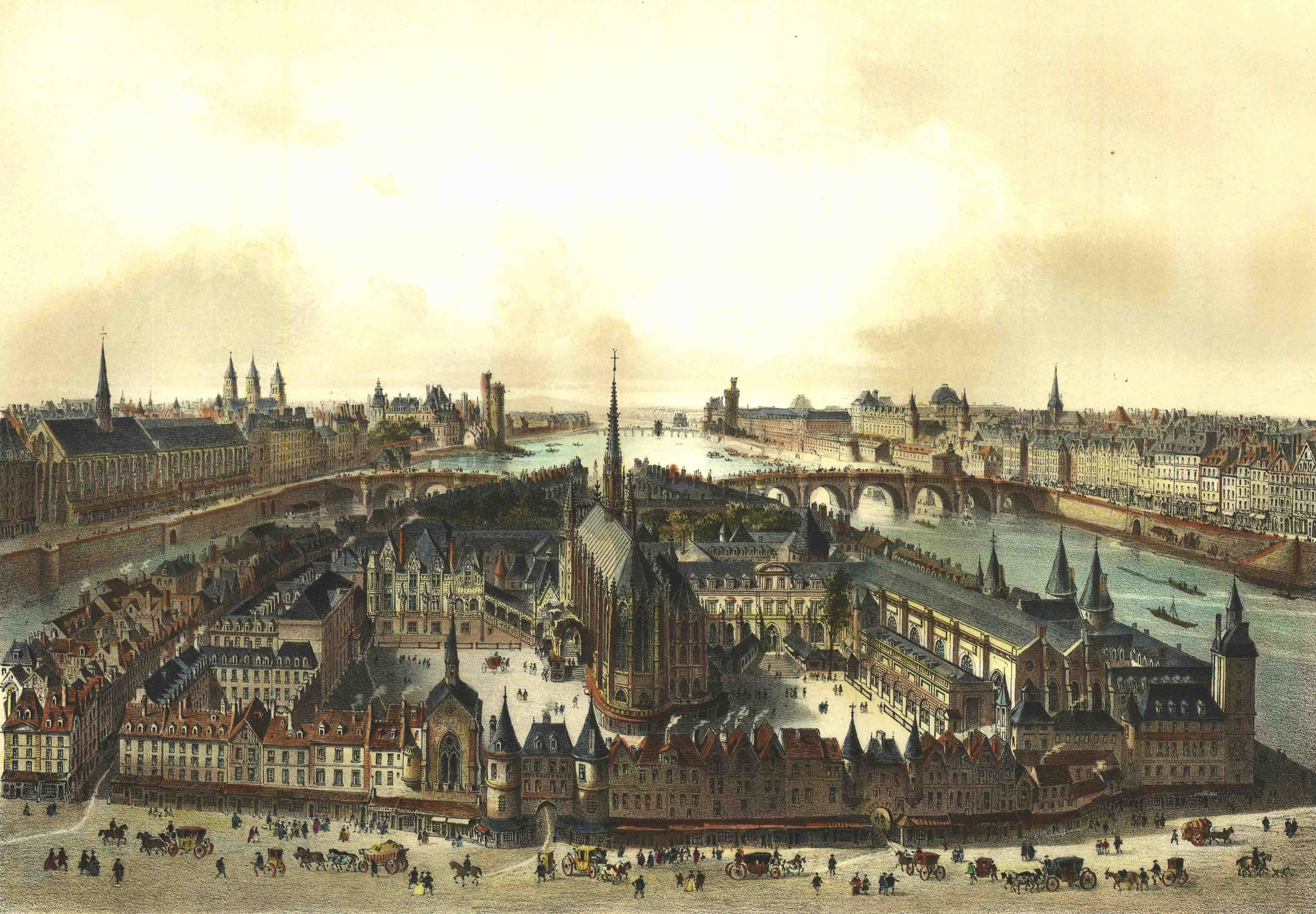
Jean Boisseau's view of the Palais de Justice in 1650, seen from Rue de la Barillerie where Perrot lived.

Perrot worked during a period when women in France achieved increasing prominence in literature and intellectual life, although their recognition in the visual arts remained limited. Alongside figures such as Henriette Stresor, Antoinette and Madeleine Hérault, and Catherine Duchemin, Perrot belonged to a small group of women who achieved professional visibility in painting under Louis XIV. Her admission to the Academy places her among the earliest officially recognised women artists in France.

Perrot trained under Nicolas Robert, a prominent botanical painter of Louis XIV’s court. Under his guidance, she learned the techniques of miniature painting, focusing on flowers, animals, and other natural subjects. Her treatises on miniature painting drew extensively on Robert’s engravings as models for study and instruction.

=== Publications ===
1. Les leçons royales ou la manière de peindre en mignature les fleurs & les oyseaux (1686) – Royal Lessons, or How to Paint Flowers and Birds in Miniature
  - Perrot’s first treatise, based on the engravings of her teacher Nicolas Robert, providing detailed instruction on copying and colouring flowers and birds in miniature.
2. Traité de la mignature (1693) – Treatise on Miniature Painting
  - An expanded edition of her 1686 work, incorporating additional subjects such as landscapes, biblical figures, and saints. This edition also included theoretical reflections, a lexicon of technical terms, and an index.
