= Stuttgart Database of Scientific Illustrators 1450–1950 =

Online repository of bibliographic data

- Website type: Bio-Bibliographic database
- Available in: English
- Website: https://dsi.hi.uni-stuttgart.de/
- Commercial: No
- Launched: 2011
- Current status: Actively maintained

The Stuttgart Database of Scientific Illustrators 1450–1950 (abbreviated DSI) is an online repository of bibliographic data about people who illustrated published scientific works from the time of the invention of the printing press, around 1450, until 1950; the latter cut-off chosen with the intention of excluding currently-active illustrators. The database includes those who worked in a variety of fields, including anatomical, astronomical, botanical, zoological and medical illustration.

The database was initiated by Klaus Hentschel and is hosted by the University of Stuttgart. Content is displayed in English, and is free to access. As of July 2026, the database includes over 14,275 illustrators. The site is searchable by 20 fields.

Suggestions for additional entries, or amendments, may be submitted by members of the public, but are subject to editorial review before inclusion.
