= Robert and Reinhold Brendel =

Father-son botanical modelmaking duo

Robert Brendel (c. 1821 — 1898) and his son Reinhold Brendel (c. 1861 — 1927) were botanical modelmakers in first Wrocław then Grunewald, Berlin. In 1866, they started the Brendel Company, initially only creating models for medicinal plants. They received help from Carl Leopold Lohmeyer to improve accuracy. Ferdinand Cohn suggested they also model for plants used to agriculture.

== See also ==
- Leopold and Rudolf Blaschka
