= Florence Woolward =

British botanical illustrator and botanist

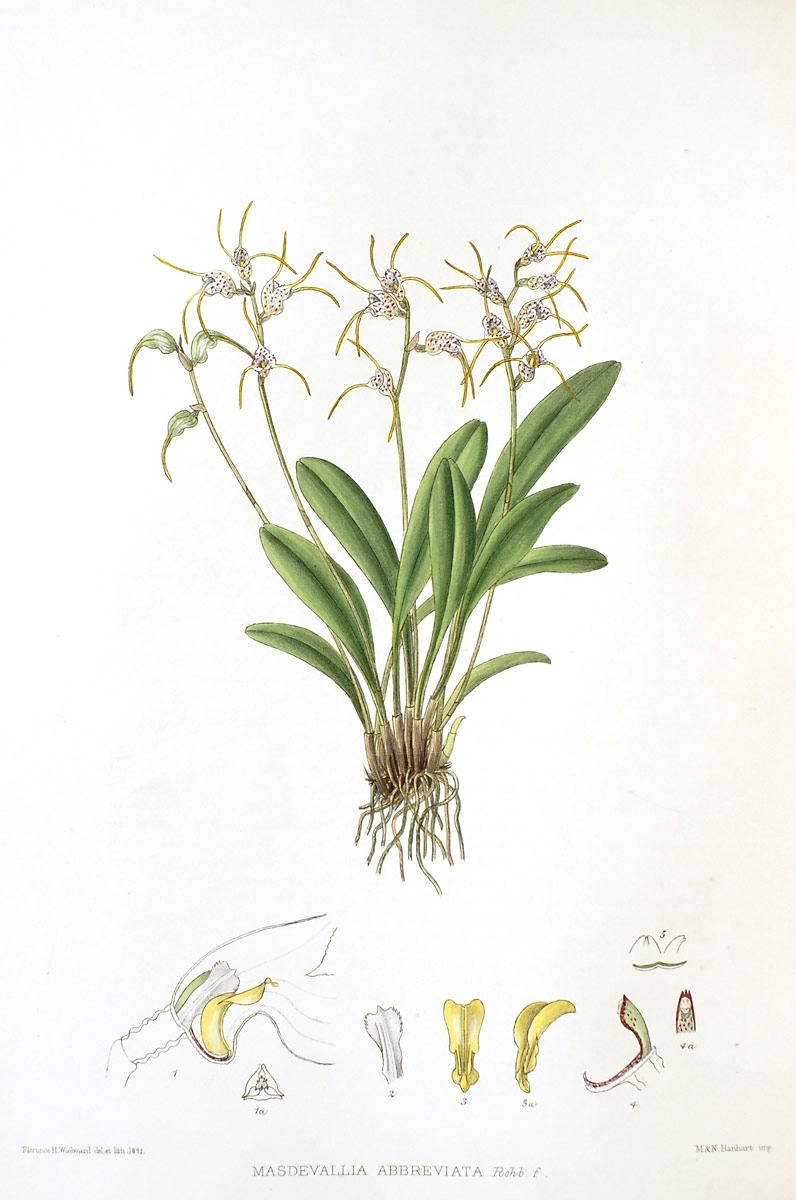
Masdevallia abbreviata

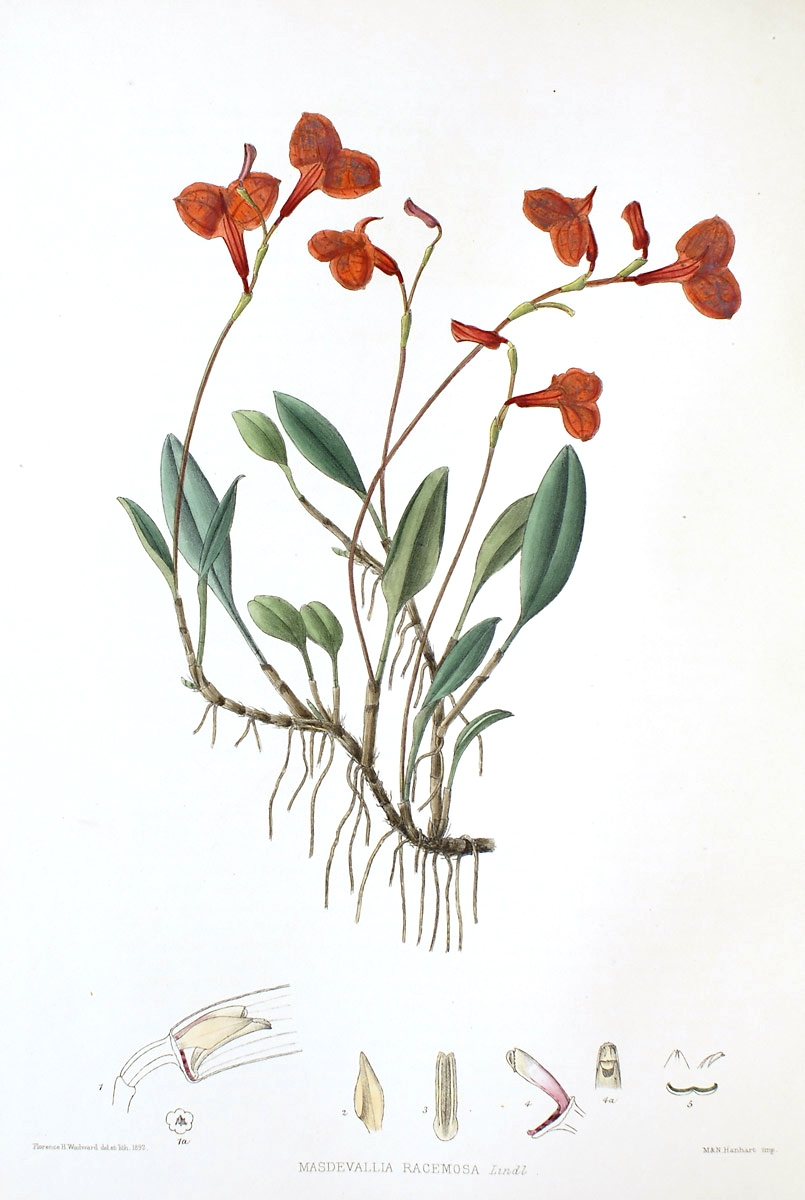
Masdevallia racemosa

Florence Helen Woolward (1854 Hammersmith – 3 January 1936) was an English botanical illustrator and author, and was commissioned by Schomberg Kerr, 9th Marquess of Lothian to paint his extensive orchid collection, and published in parts between 1891 and 1896 as "The Genus Masdevallia". The standard author abbreviation Woolward is used to indicate this person as the author when citing a botanical name.

== Biography ==
Woolward was a freelance artist and the daughter of Reverend Woolward. She lived in Belton, Lincolnshire, and was commissioned by Schomberg, through the Talbot Sisters, to paint orchids and fungi from Newbattle Abbey and Monteviot House. Although she received no formal training as an artist or botanist, she completed the project for Schomberg and later worked at the Natural History Museum.

"The Genus Masdevallia" is considered one of the finest illustrated orchid books of the Victorian age. The Marquess had a passion for orchids, in particular the Andean Masdevallias of which he had a sizeable collection at Newbattle Abbey in Scotland. Most of these came from Friedrich Carl Lehmann, who was a regular advertiser in the pages of "The Gardeners' Chronicle". Pressed flowers from Newbattle Abbey are still preserved at the Natural History Museum. Spending some ten years on visits to Newbattle Abbey, Woolward depicted more than 350 orchids, of which 85 were Masdevallias.

After having problems in finding a professional botanist to write the text accompanying each plate, Woolward decided to write it herself and the work appeared in nine parts between 1891 and 1896, each part with ten plates and text, the final part having only seven plates. The parts were priced at £1 10s each, a total of £13 10s for the set. Each species has detailed notes on its habitat in the Andes, and these were written by Lehmann. Some of his original, hand-written descriptions are in possession of his family in Popayán, as well as a letter from Woolward. The plates were lithographed by Florence herself – the hand-coloured plates depict all the Masdevallia species at life-size. Originally 250 copies were planned, but it appears that only 150 were actually issued, with 100 being bound. In the introduction Woolward writes of her involvement in the book's preparation: "It is no doubt advantageous in botanical work … that the person who makes the original drawing from nature should also lithograph the plates and indicate the colours to be used by the colorist, for, by this means, the work passes through fewer hands and is more likely to turn out accurate. I have therefore pursued this method throughout the present work, and have, besides, touched up the colouring of every plate sent out, numbering nearly 9,000"

Bound volumes of Woolward's paintings of orchids and fungi remain with the heirs of the Marquess. Her later works for the Natural History Museum are showpieces of draughtsmanship and botanical accuracy. Her work on elms and poplars concluded in about 1908, and her landscapes somewhat earlier. From then, it would appear, that she produced no further works.

After publication of "The Genus Masdevallia" some original plates remained in the possession of the Woolward family, but their whereabouts remained unknown. They were finally found in the care of two of Woolward's great nieces living on the Welsh Borders. The contents of an old trunk included not only the plates, but also "framed photographs, hand-painted china, and memorabilia". The folio of paintings was donated to Royal Botanic Gardens, Kew, joining Woolward's original vignettes which had been donated to Kew by Rev. Spenser A. Woolward in 1937.

== Letter from Woolward to Friedrich Carl Lehmann ==
Belton, Grantham, Lincolnshire

February 17th 1891

Dear Consul Lehmann, I send you tracings from my drawings of two species of Masdevallia, for which I much wish to have a note from you, as I intend to substitute them for two of the ten on the list which I sent you in my letters of Dec. 18th and Feb. 2nd. They are rare and will create more interest than the commoner species which I intend to include in Part II. If you could tell me, by the return mail, where you found the two species, their altitude etc. I think and hope that I might receive your letter in time to have your note printed for part II of the Monograph. I have got complete drawings ready, and a photograph and descriptions. M. guttulata was first described by Reichenbach in Linnaea XLI (1977) p. 118. No locality given, except "Ecuador"? No name of discoverer. Of course it is of the same section as M. ephippium etc. In the Gardeners' Chronicle Sept. 6th 1890, p. 267 to my great amusement, Mr Rolfe described M. guttulata as a new species! having quite overlooked the fact that Professor Reichenbach described it in 1877. No locality or discoverer is given in the latter reference. M. picturata was first described by Reichenbach in Otia Bot. Hamb. 16. Collected by Wagener, Fendler and Arnold. Locality, Venezuela? Flowered first with Mr. F. Sander, 1882. There seems to have been a recent importation of this species, for I have lately heard of more than one instance of its flowering this year, apparently for the first time since 1882. I should be glad if you would be kind enough to tell me your experience with these two species, for so little is known about them that it would be most useful and interesting. I shall soon have completed the lithographing for Part II and I shall then go to London to collect information for the text, which your notes, so anxiously expected by me, will complete for printing.

Hoping that you are well, and with kind regards I am yours very truly

— Florence H. Woolward
