= Iinuma Yokusai =

Japanese botanist and physician (1782–1865)

Iinuma Yokusai (飯沼 慾斎; 1782–1865) was a Japanese botanist and medical doctor. The standard author abbreviation Iinuma is used to indicate this person as the author when citing a botanical name.

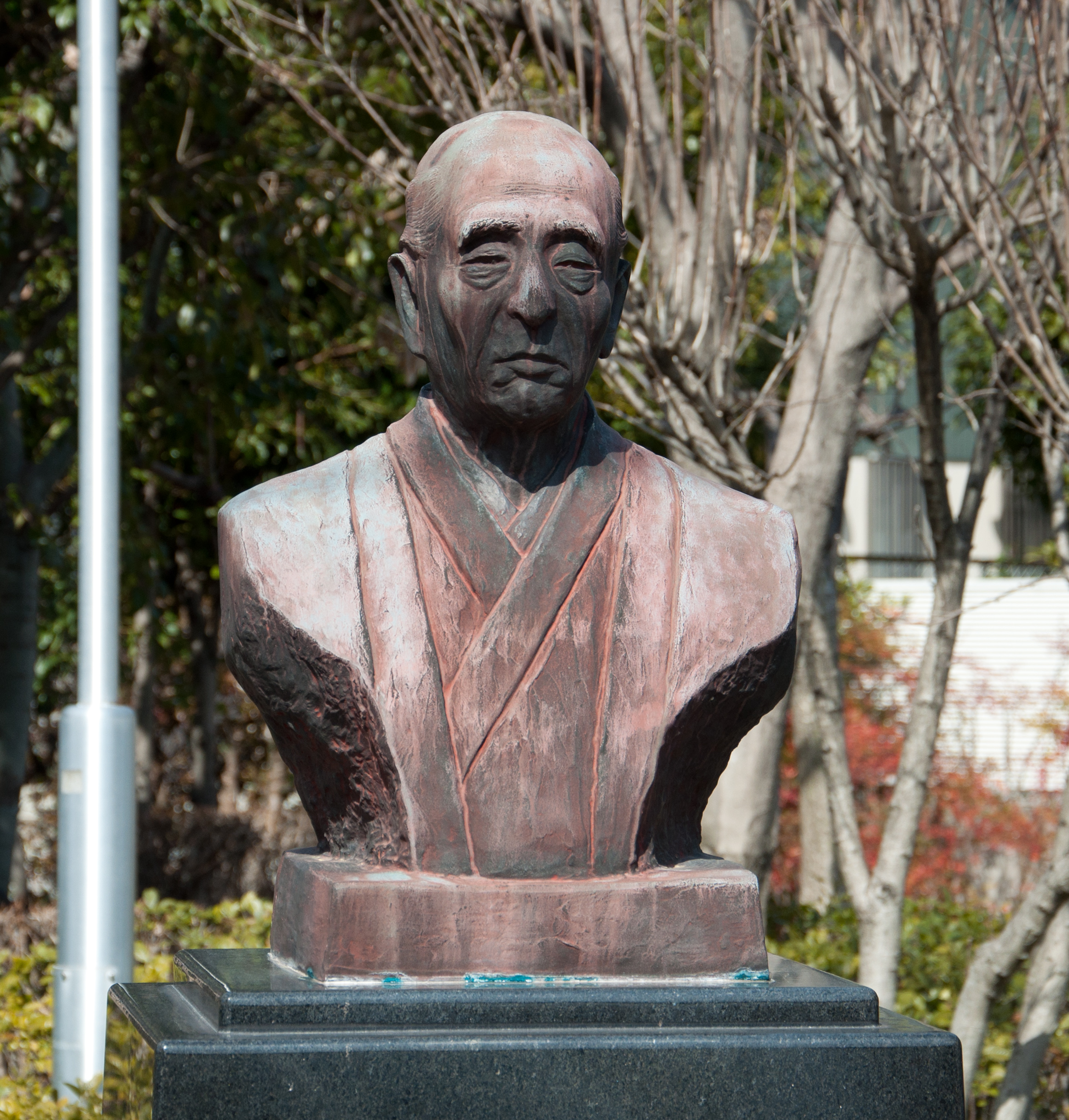
Statue of Yokusai Iinuma in Ogaki Gifu, Japan

Iinuma studied botany under Ono Ranzan. He spoke Dutch and was a practitioner of Western medicine. In 1856 he published the Somoku-zusetsu, the first botanical encyclopedia in Japan to use Linnaean taxonomy. The strawberry species Fragaria iinumae is named after him.
