= Iwasaki Tsunemasa =

Japanese botanist, zoologist and entomologist (1786–1842)

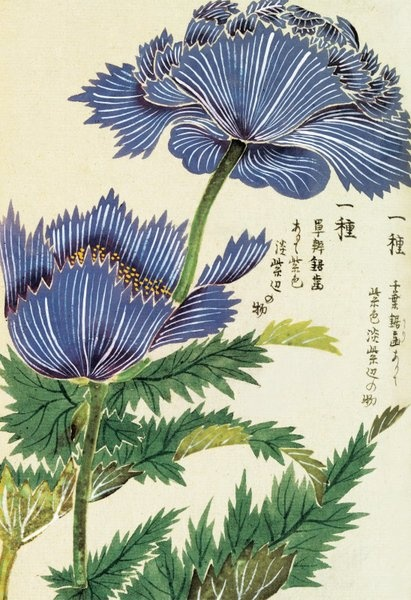
Papaver somniferum var paeoniflorum Plate from Honzō Zufu

Iwasaki Tsunemasa also Kan-en (岩崎 常正 or 灌園, 1786–1842) was a Japanese botanist, zoologist and entomologist. He was also a samurai in the service of the Tokugawa shogunate.

He wrote:

- Bukō-sanbutsu-shi a work on the natural history of the Edo district including botany zoology and entomology as lists.
- Honzō Zufu (Iconographia Plantarum or Diagrams and Chronicles of Botany) a woodblock illustrated work (1828, 1884, 1920, 1921 in 93 volumes). Plants only.
- Honzō Sen'yō (Essentials to the study of plants and animals). Unpublished. Two volumes includes insects and gives some Dutch names. Some editions include the Binomial nomenclature introduced by Carl Linnaeus in 1758.
- Sōmoku-sodategusa (Cultivation of Flowering Plants). Two volumes of woodcut illustrations (1818).Includes 13 Ukiyo-e of insects which cause plant damage. One was Papilio xuthus which fed on fragrant citrus. He described the larva with its osmeterium.
