= Georg Philipp Rugendas =

German painter

- Georg Philipp Rugendas, Cavalry Battle, priv. col.
- Born: 27 November 1666; Augsburg, Free Imperial City of Augsburg
- Died: 9 May 1742 (aged 75); Augsburg, Free Imperial City of Augsburg
- Education: Accademia di San Luca
- Occupations: Painter; Engraver
- Years active: 1687–1742
- Movement: Baroque

Georg Philipp Rugendas (27 November 1666 – 9 May 1742) was a battle and military genre painter and engraver born in the Free Imperial City of Augsburg in what is now Bavaria, Germany.

== Biography ==
His father, a watchmaker, trained him in copper engraving, but after a fistula on his right hand forced him to abandon this he was apprenticed (1683–7) to the Augsburg historical painter Isaak Fisches I (1638–1706). Following this he went to study in Rome (1689), Vienna (1692), and Venice (1693), where he studied under Antonio Molinari. The following year, he returned to Rome to attend the Accademia di San Luca. There, he studied the works of Michelangelo Cerquozzi and Antonio Tempesta, and joined the Bentvueghels, the confraternity of northern painters in Rome.

Following his father's death in 1695, Rugendas returned to Augsburg. Two years later, he married Anna Barbara Haid, who came from an Augsburg family of artists specialising in goldbeating and copper engraving. He became a master, and from 1710 was Protestant director of the city’s art academy. Rugendas took Bourguignon, Lemke, and Tempesta for his models, but formed his style more especially through the study of the various phases of the military profession, from real life. During the siege and pillage of Augsburg in 1703, he exposed himself to great danger by drawing, in the midst of the engagements, the scenes around him. The six etchings resulting from this are perhaps the most meritorious part of his work.

Rugendas became popular for his battle scenes. His genre paintings such as the Pillage after a Battle (before 1737; Brunswick, Herzog Anton Ulrich Museum) were much sought after for the decoration of great houses and palaces.

Johann Caspar Füssli, his first biographer, says he gave up painting c. 1715 in favour of graphic work, because he painted too slowly to be able to feed his family, and did not take it up again for 20 years. There clearly are different stylistic periods in his oeuvre, though a clear dating has yet to be established. His paintings being rarely signed, many false attributions have inflated the size of his oeuvre. This corresponds neither to the accounts of his careful working methods nor to the esteem in which he was held. The large quantity of his studies from nature (mainly Augsburg, Schaezlerpalais) shows that Rugendas strove for objectivity of depiction. In thus attaining Wahrheit (‘truth’), Rugendas was considered one of the most important artists of the time.

Along with Johann Elias Ridinger, Rugendas was one of the teachers of Johann Jacob Haid, who had come to Augsburg in 1726 for his training. Rugendas’s sons Georg Philipp Rugendas II (1701–74), Christian Rugendas (1708–81), and Jeremias Gottlob Rugendas (1710–72) helped with the print publishing house he set up in 1735, and the family continued working in this field in Augsburg until the mid-19th century.

== Gallery ==
Amusement in the Field Camp, 1695-1696, Gemäldegalerie, Berlin

Equestrian Scene, Städel, Frankfurt

The Siege of a City, Gemäldegalerie, Berlin

== Bibliography ==
- Füssli, Johann Caspar (1758). Leben Georg Philipp Rugendas und Johannes Kupezki. Zurich.
- Krämer, Gode (2003). "Rugendas, Georg Philipp, I". Grove Art Online. doi:10.1093/oao/9781884446054.013.90000370874.
