= Gregorio Guglielmi =

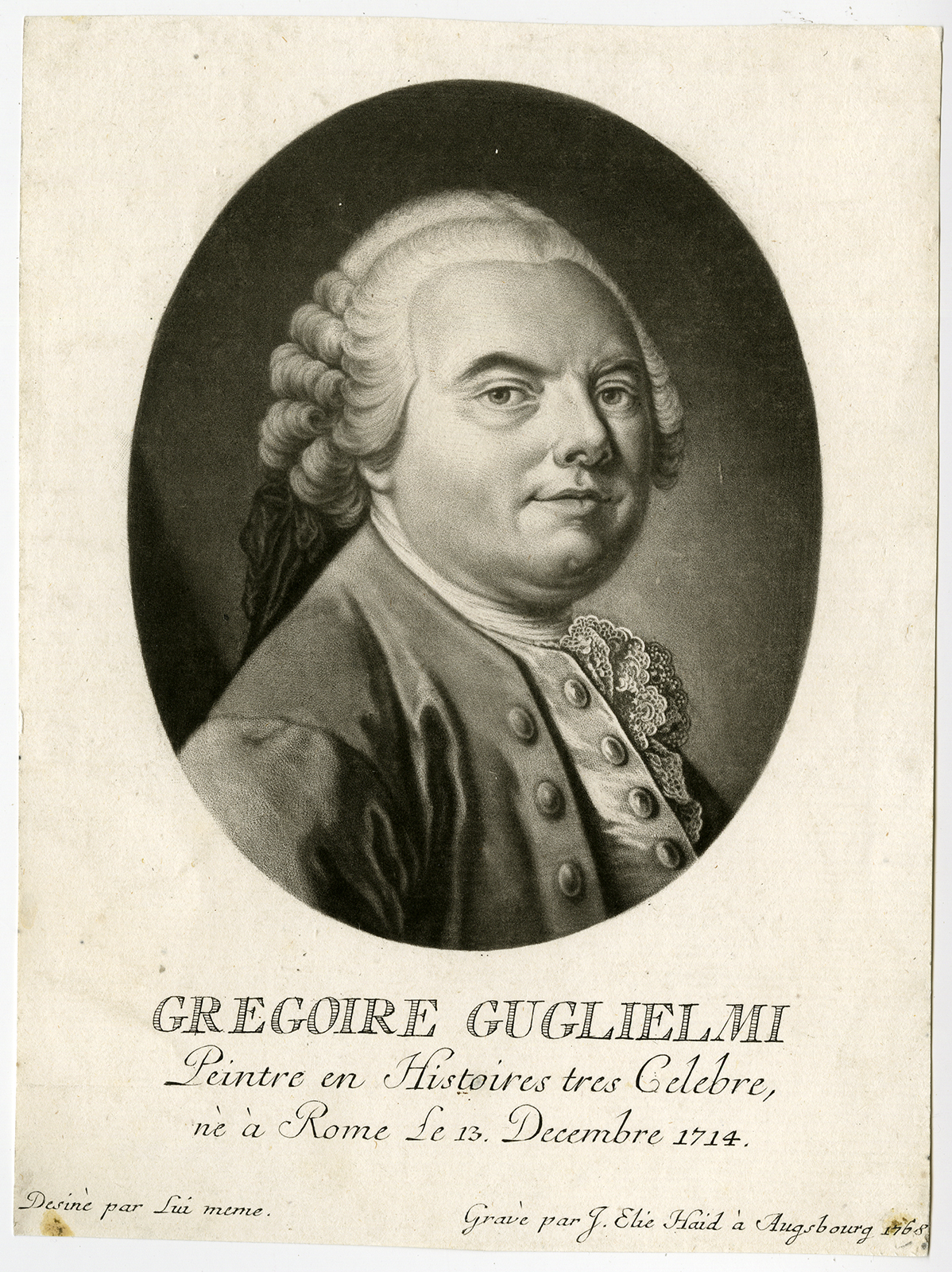
Gregorio Guglielmi, by Johann Elias Haid (1768)

Gregorio Guglielmi (13 December 1714, Rome - 2 February 1773, Saint Petersburg) was an Italian-born fresco painter who worked primarily in Germany.

== Biography ==
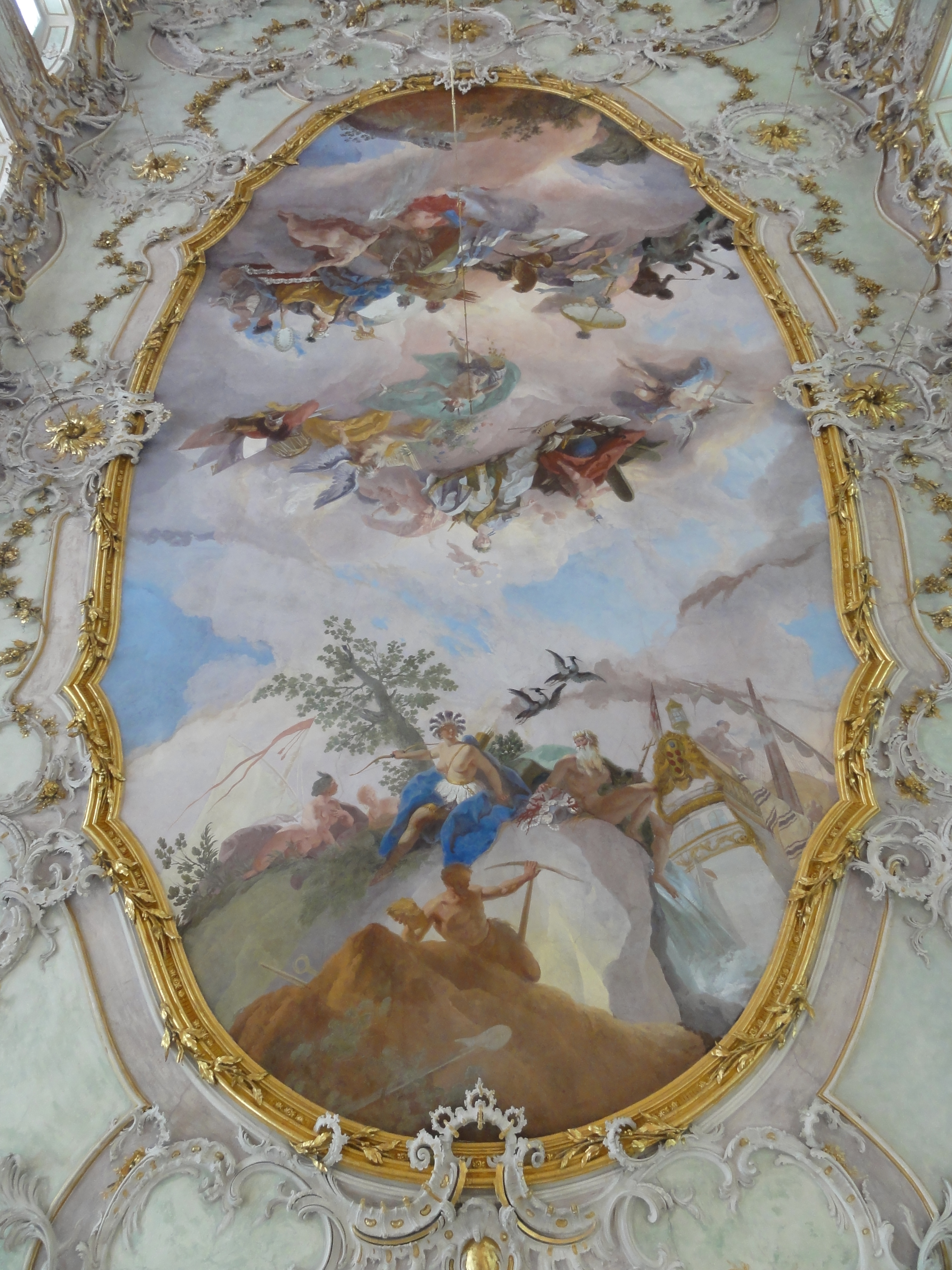
Ceiling fresco at the Schaezlerpalais

His artistic education concluded with lessons from Francesco Trevisani, but he was already turning toward the Academic style of Sebastiano Conca, with whom he may also have studied. There are some indications that he studied in Paris during the 1740s and became acquainted with Claude Joseph Vernet. Early on, he obtained the patronage of Cardinal Alessandro Albani and may have also been supported by Cardinal Neri Maria Corsini.

In 1752, he was invited to Naples by the architect, Ferdinando Fuga, but court intrigues prevented him from obtaining any major commissions. However, Queen Maria Amalia introduced him to her father, Elector Frederick Augustus II, who arranged for him to work in Dresden.

His Academic inclinations were enhanced in Germany; where he met Pietro Metastasio. In 1755, he created frescoes, inspired by Metastasio, at what is now the Austrian Academy of Sciences, and in Schönbrunn Palace, upon commission by the Sardinian ambassador, Luigi Gerolamo Malabaila (1704-1773). The latter were heavily damaged in World War II. In 1764, at the invitation of the Swedish painter, Sophonias de Derichs, he was working in Berlin. A major project, proposed by King Stanisław August Poniatowski for Ujazdów Castle never came to fruition.

The following year, he made a temporary return to Italy to paint an altarpiece at the Chiesa dei Santi Martiri and murals at the Royal Palace in Turin, followed by frescoes at the Cappella Colleoni in Bergamo. He then went back to Germany, creating frescoes for the main hallway at the Schaezlerpalais in Augsburg.

As early as 1767, he had submitted drawings to the Russian court in Saint Petersburg. In 1770, he was finally called there by Catherine the Great, assisted by the De Derichs, who had already established themselves at the court. But, except for some portraits, his work there never progressed beyond the initial sketches. In fact, it was said (by the sculptor, Étienne Maurice Falconet), that he died of a "putrid fever" after Catherine severely criticized a portrait of her. For some commentators, the fact that he and De Derichs died on the same day, followed by De Derichs' wife the day after, suggests that they were poisoned. No motive has been proposed, although Falconet's comment may indicate that he was not well-liked.

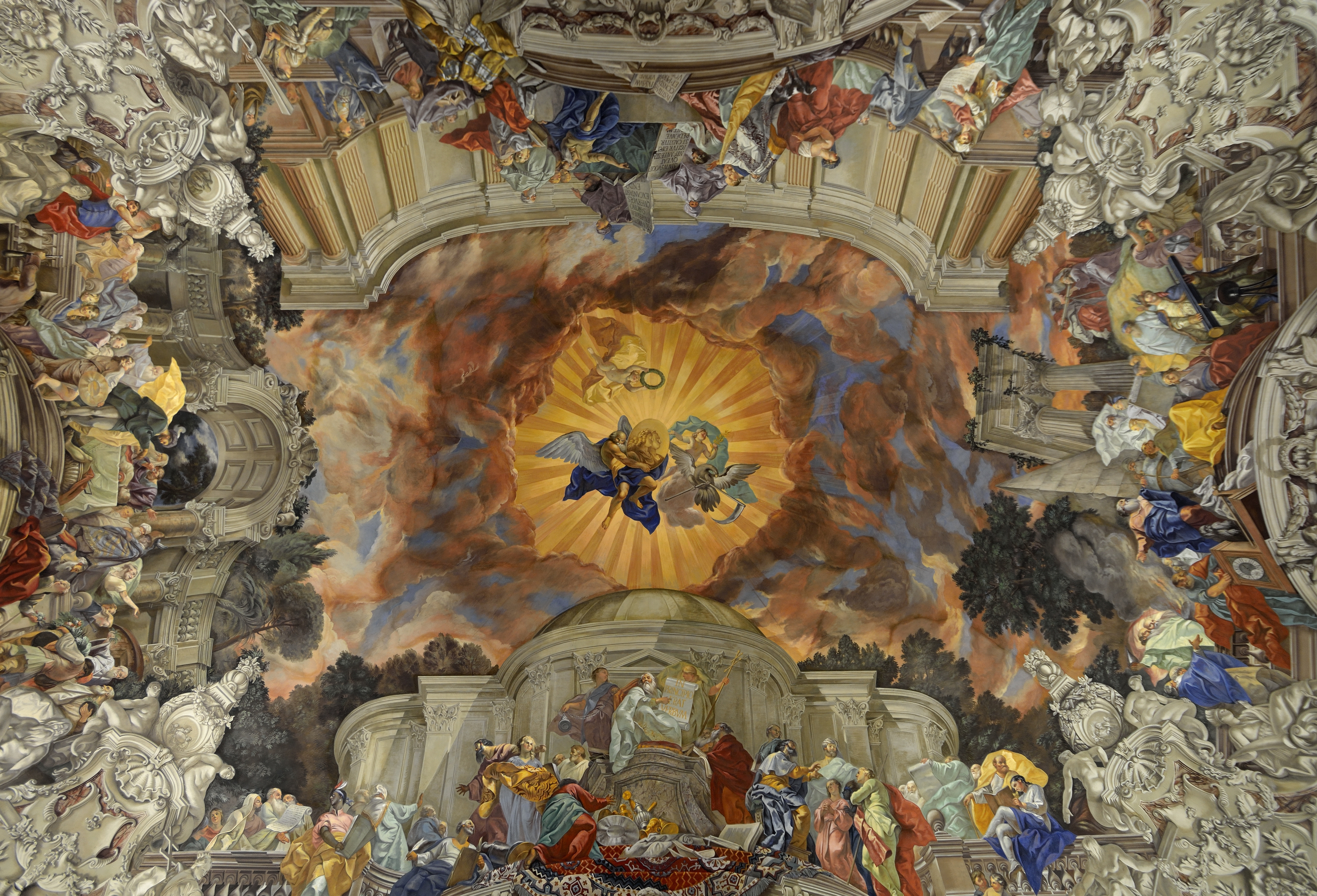
Ceiling fresco at the Austrian Academy of Sciences
