= Johann Jacob Haid =

German engraver (1704–1767)

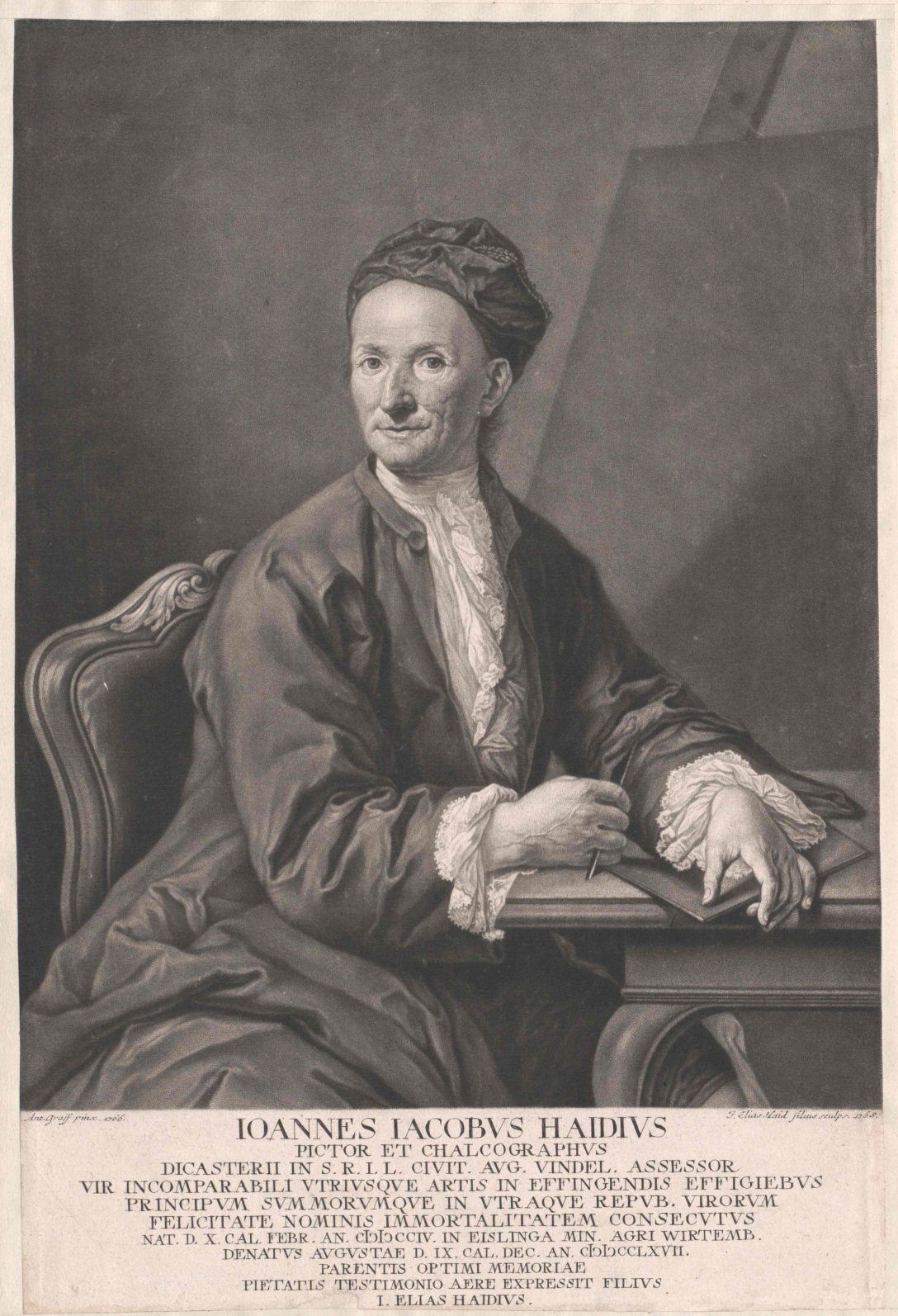
- Haid by his son, Johann Elias Haid
- Born: 1704
- Died: 9 December 1767 (aged 35); Augsburg, Bavaria

Johann Jacob Haid or Johann Jakob Haid (1704 – 9 December 1767) was a German engraver who worked in Augsburg.

== Life and works ==
Haid came from a German family of artists and engravers and was known for large mezzotint portraits.

He worked in England, and it has been suggested that he borrowed from the work of Robert Robinson (c. 1651 – 1706), who was a popular English mezzotint engraver, painter, and stage designer.

Haid also produced botanical work after Bartholomäus Seuter (1678–1754) and with Johann Elias Ridinger, and worked on Johann Wilhelm Weinmann's "Phytanthoza iconographia".

== Selected works ==
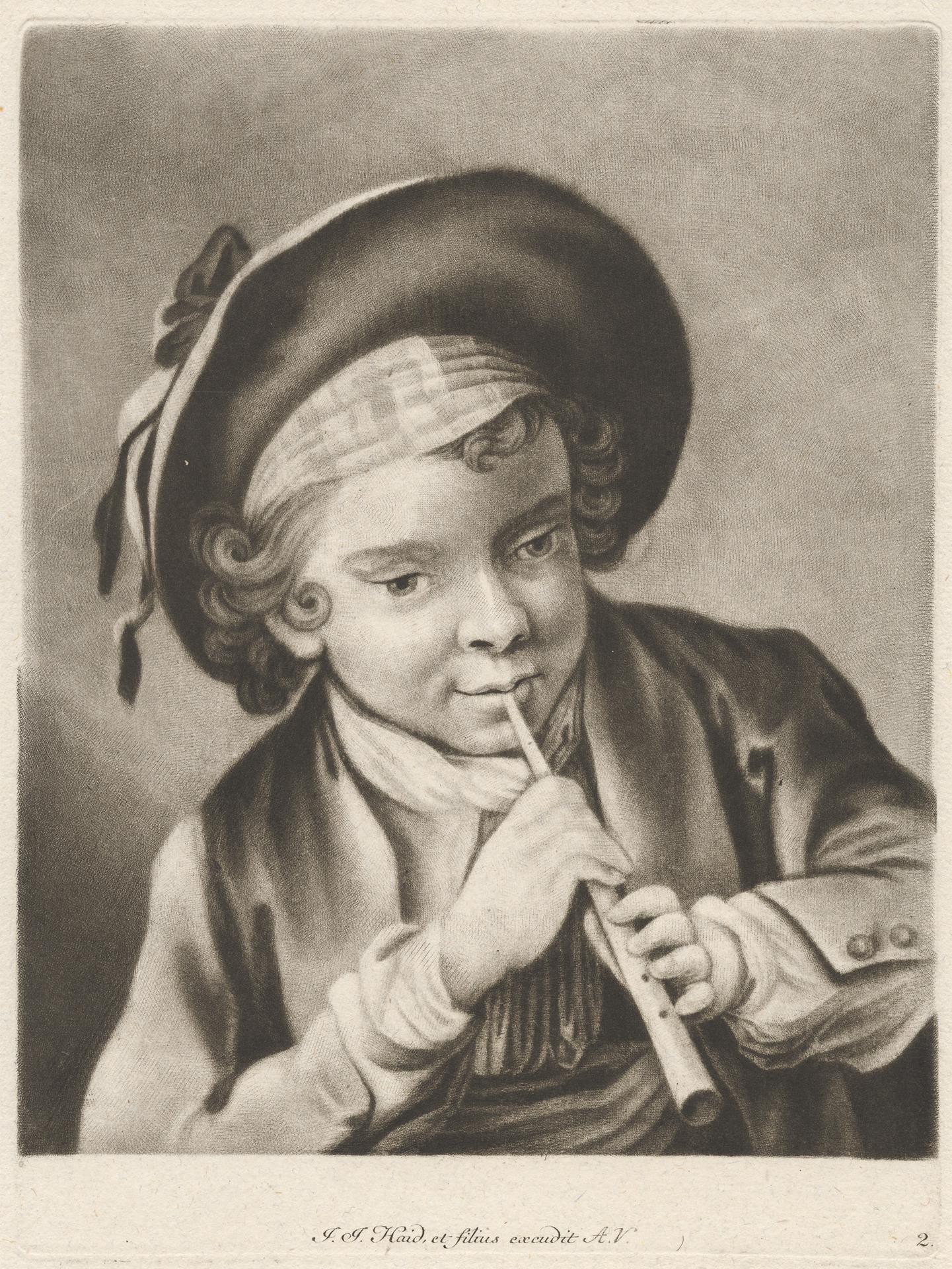
Boy with a Whistle

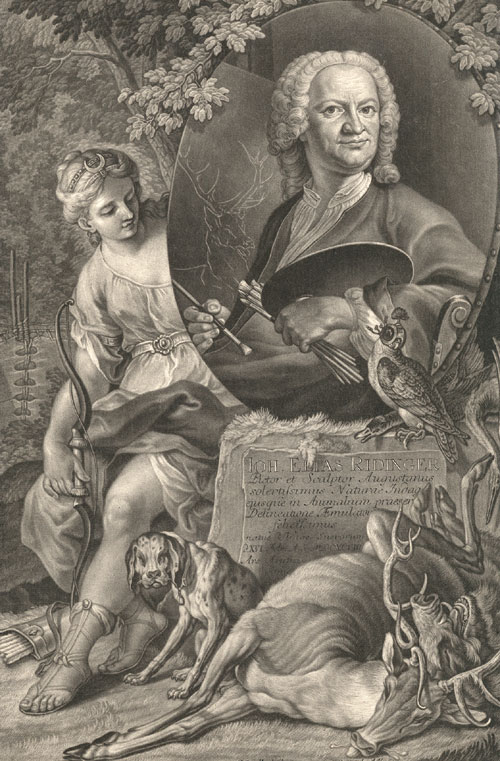
Portrait of Johann Elias Ridinger

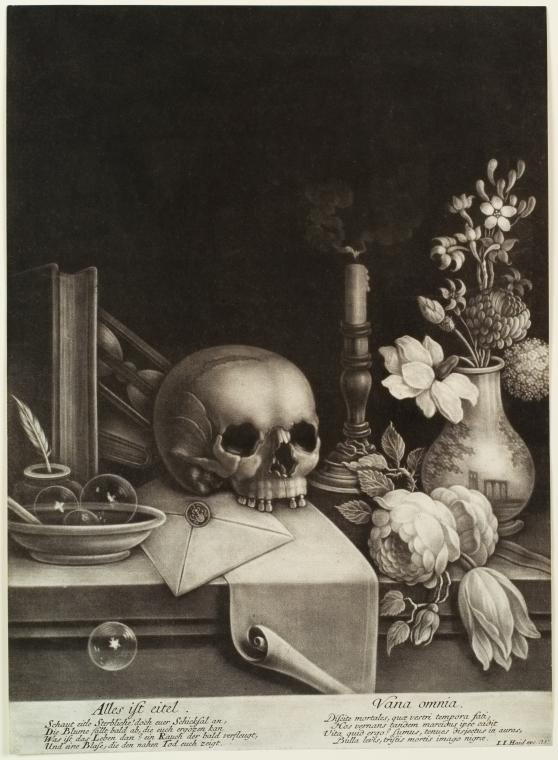
All is Vanity

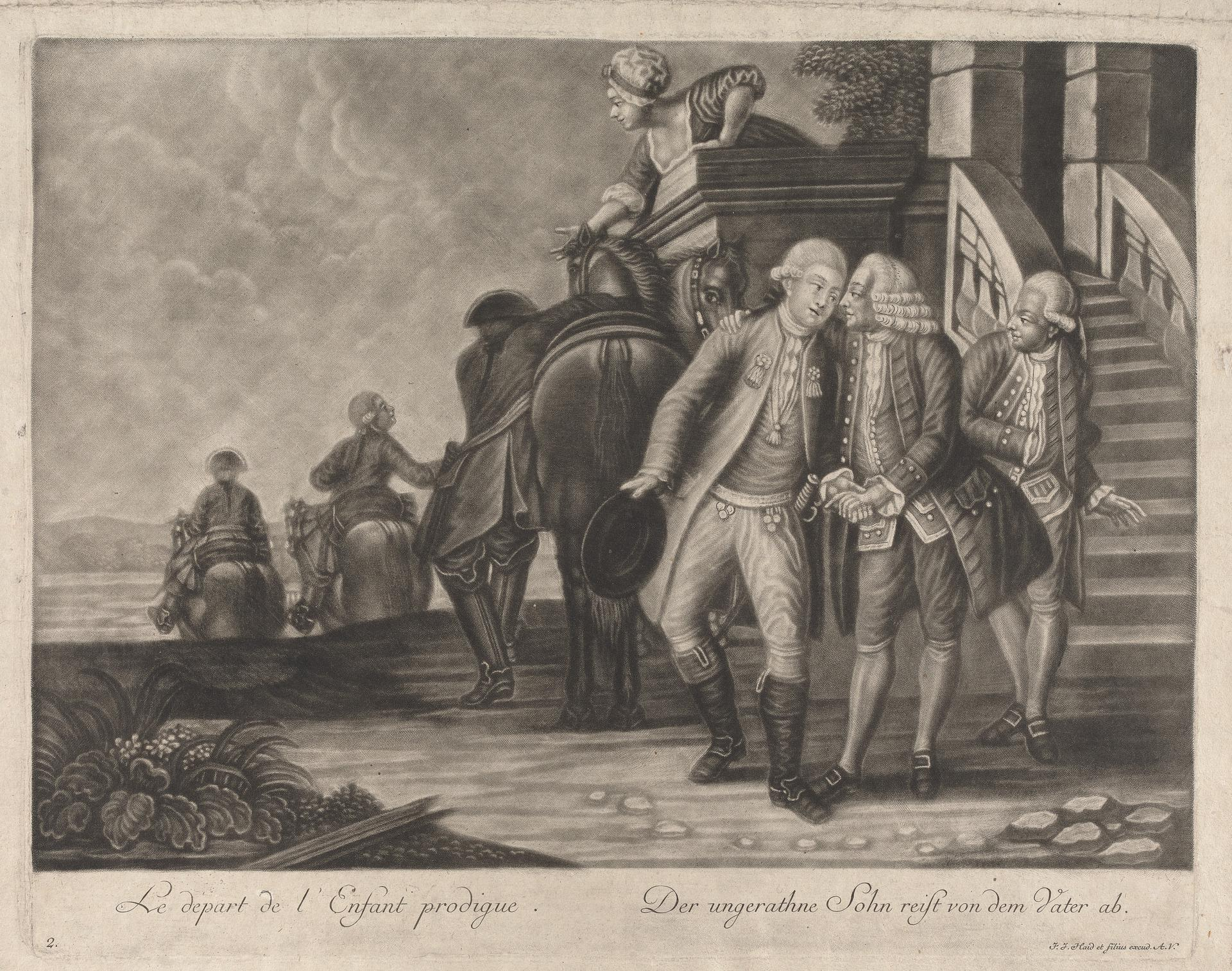
Departure of the Prodigal Son

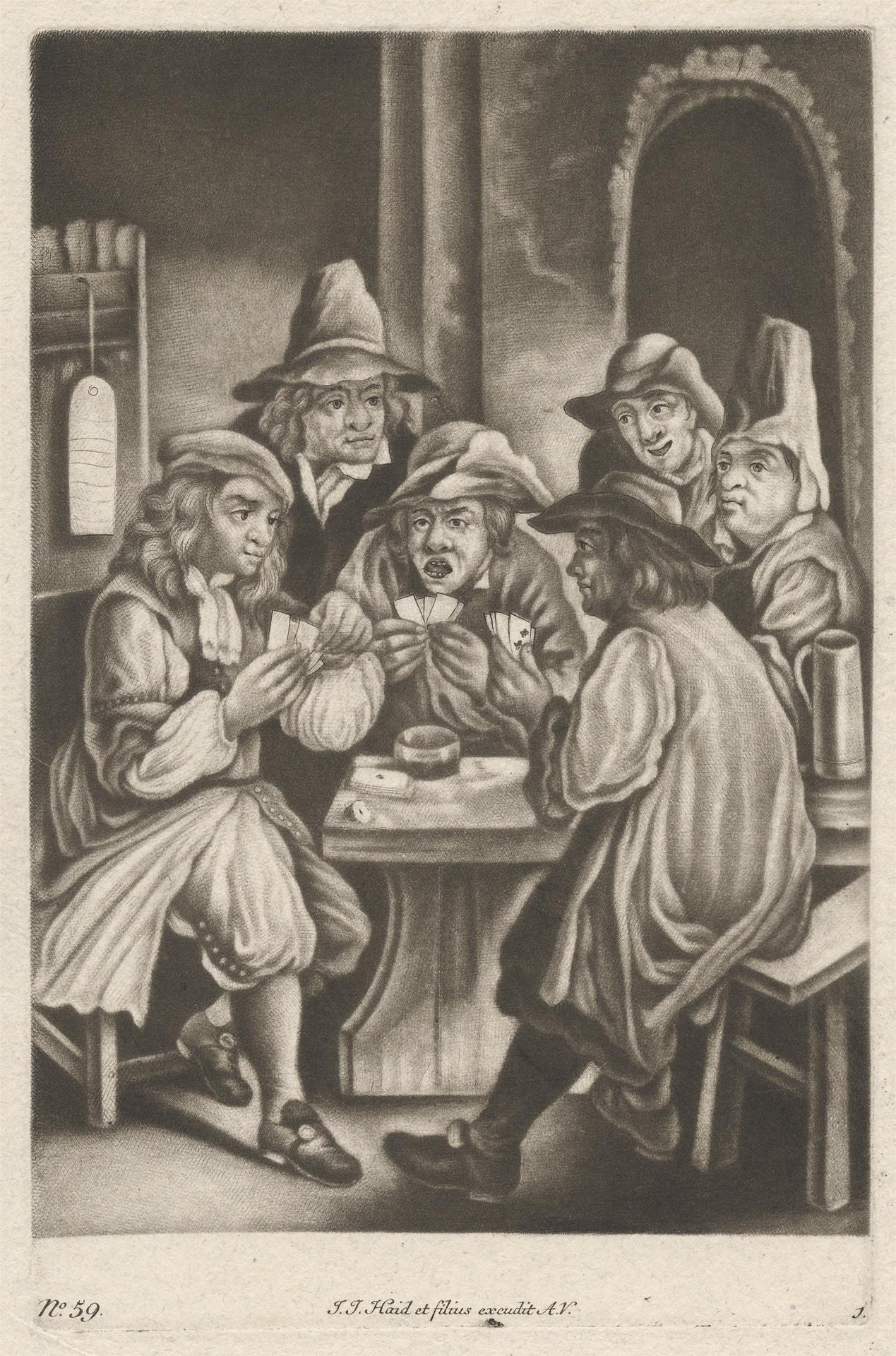
Men Playing Cards

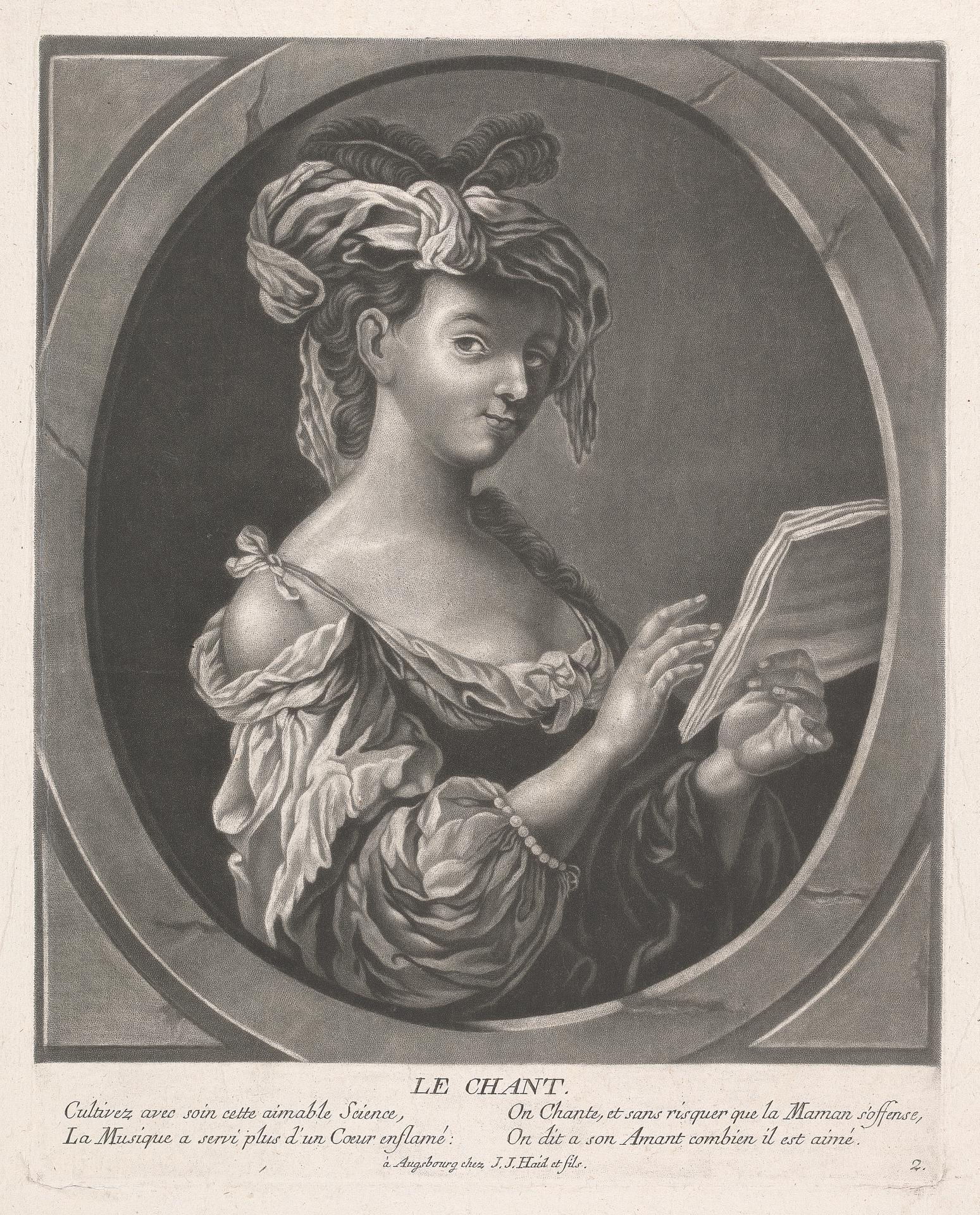
The Song
