= Johann Augustus Eberhard =

German theologian and popular philosopher (1739–1809)

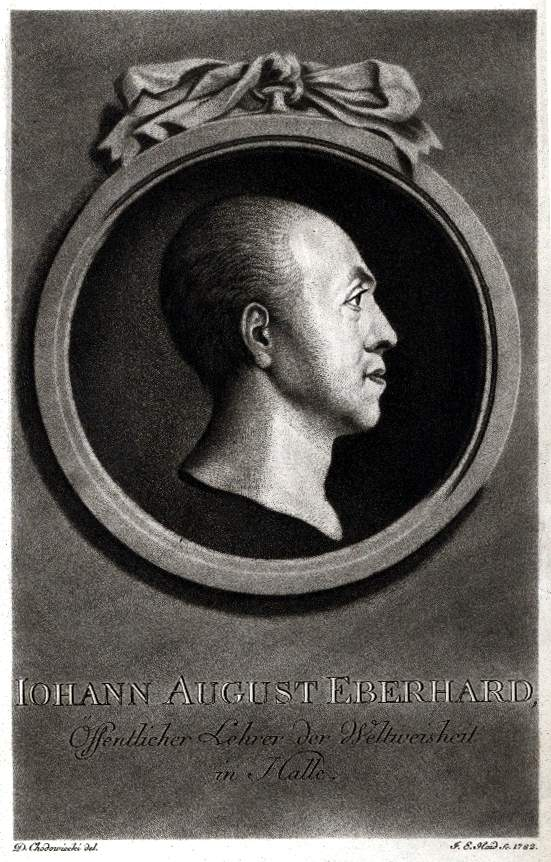
Johann Augustus Eberhard by Johann Elias Haid

Johann Augustus Eberhard (German: [ˈeːbɐhaʁt]; August 31, 1739 – January 6, 1809) was a German theologian and "popular philosopher".

== Life and career ==
Eberhard was born in Halberstadt in the Principality of Halberstadt, where his father was a school teacher and the singing master at the church of St. Martin's. He studied theology at the University of Halle, and became tutor to the eldest son of Baron von der Horst, to whose family he was attached for several years. In 1763 he was appointed co-rector of the school of St. Martin's, and second preacher in the hospital church of the Holy Ghost, but he soon resigned these offices and followed his patron to Berlin. There he met C. F. Nicolai and Moses Mendelssohn, with whom he formed a close friendship, and who were instrumental in his forming his own views. In 1768 he became chaplain to the workhouse at Berlin and the neighbouring fishing village of Stralow. Here he wrote his Neue Apologie des Socrates (1772), a work occasioned by an attack on the fifteenth chapter of Jean-François Marmontel's Belisarius by Peter Hofstede, a Rotterdam clergyman.

In 1774 he was appointed to the living of Charlottenburg. A second volume of his Apologie appeared in 1778. In this he tried to meet some objections to the former part, and continued his inquiries into the doctrines of the Christian religion, religious toleration, and the proper rules for interpreting the Scriptures. In 1778 he accepted the professorship of philosophy at Halle, where his students included Friedrich Schleiermacher and the Serbian Enlightenment writer Dositej Obradović. In 1786 he was admitted as a member of the Berlin Academy of Sciences; in 1805 the King of Prussia conferred upon him the honorary title of privy-councillor. In 1808 he obtained the degree of Doctor in Divinity, which was awarded for his theological writings. He died in Berlin in 1809.

He was a master of the learned languages, spoke and wrote French fluently, and understood English, Italian and Dutch.

== Theological and philosophical work ==
=== Theology ===
Eberhard argued in books such as Neue Apologie des Socrates that salvation did not depend upon revelation, that it was possible for a heathen to go to heaven, and that the notion of eternal punishment contradicted its supposed aim of morally improving the sinner.

=== Philosophy ===
Eberhard argued in support of John Locke's position that all knowledge comes through the senses, but developed this into a full-blooded phenomenalism. In aesthetics he held a position that he called "subjective finalism", a label later adopted by Immanuel Kant: rather than being an objective property of objects, beauty is the relationship between the object and the representative power of the observer. For him, then, art should aim to awake and stimulate the pleasurable passions. According to Eberhard, aesthetic activity first appears in children's play.

In his position as editor of the Philosophisches Magazin (1788–1792) and the Philosophisches Archiv (1792–1795), Eberhard published many articles (most of which he wrote himself) critical of Kant. He argued that Kant's work was wholly derivative, simply adopting the work of Gottfried Leibniz, and a variety of dogmatism. Kant responded to Eberhard's criticism in his Ueber eine Entdeckung, nach der alle neue Kritik der reinen Vernunft durch eine ältere entbehrlich gemacht werden soll (Königsberg, 1790).

=== Works ===
- Neue Apologie des Socrates (two volumes, 1776–1778)
- Allgemeine Theorie des Denkens und Empfindens (Berlin, 1776), won the Royal Society of Berlin prize for that year
- Von dem Begriff der Philosophie und ihren Theilen (Berlin, 1778) — a short essay, in which he announced the plan of his lectures on being appointed to the professorship at Halle
- Lobschrift auf Herrn Johann Thunmann Prof. der Weitweisheit und Beredsamkeit auf der Universität zu Halle (Halle, 1779)
- Vorbereitung zur natürlichen Theologie (Halle, 1781), translated as Preparation for Natural Theology (Bloomsbury, 2016)
- Amyntor, eine Geschichte in Briefen (Berlin, 1782)
- Über die Zeichen der Aufklärung einer Nation (Halle, 1783)
- Theorie der schönen Künste und Wissenschaften (Halle, 1783, third edition 1790)
- Vermischte Schriften (Halle, 1784)
- Neue vermischte Schriften (Halle, 1786)
- Allgemeine Geschichte der Philosophie (Halle, 1788), second edition with a continuation and chronological tables (1796)
- Versuch einer allgemeinen-deutschen Synonymik (Halle and Leipzig, 1795–1802, six volumes, fourth edition 1852–1853) — an abridgment was published by the author in one large volume (Halle, 1802)
- Handbuch der Aesthetik (Halle, 1803–1805, second edition 1807–1820).
