= On Religion =

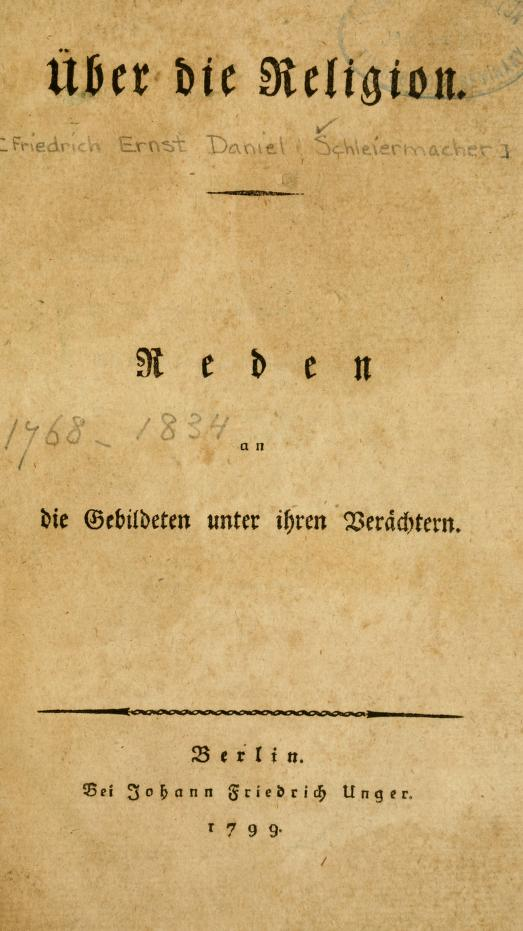
Title page of the first edition of On Religion

On Religion: Speeches to its Cultured Despisers (German: Über die Religion: Reden an die Gebildeten unter ihren Verächtern) is a book written by the German theologian Friedrich Schleiermacher (1768–1834). Originally published in 1799, two further editions were released in Schleiermacher's lifetime in 1806 and 1821.

Schleiermacher wrote On Religion while teaching and preaching in Berlin. The Enlightenment had invigorated scientific and historical research, overshadowing theology in the university. In this work, Schleiermacher defends religion against the skepticism of a modern audience.

== Composition ==
Since the early age of 15, Schleiermacher had been personally grappling with the most significant issues of Christology, particularly his own doubt in regard to the problem of atonement. He entered a Moravian seminary in Barby, Saxony in 1785, only to lead to his eventual expulsion for engaging in heretical philosophic discourse. He left for the University of Halle and completed his first theological examination some five years later. Following his graduation, Schleiermacher took up a teaching post at the University of Berlin in 1793 and joined the Charité Hospital in 1796 as a regular preacher.

=== Intellectual climate of Berlin ===
Schleiermacher was writing around the time the Enlightenment was in full swing and arguably when the first major transition into modernity was simultaneously occurring. With the fall of the late Middle Ages and a vigorous discourse taking hold of Western European intellectuals, the fields of art and natural philosophy were flourishing. However, the discourse of theologians, arguably the primary and only discourse of intellectuals for centuries, had taken to its own now minor corner in the universities. This backdrop is evident in the first line of Schleiermacher's text, "It may be an unexpected and even a marvelous undertaking, that any one should still venture to demand from the very class that have raised themselves above the vulgar, and are saturated with the wisdom of the centuries, attention for a subject so entirely neglected by them. ... Now especially the life of cultivated people is far from anything that might have even a resemblance to religion."

== Contents ==
On Religion is divided into five major sections: the Defense (Apologie), the Nature of Religion (Über das Wesen der Religion), the Cultivation of Religion (Über die Bildung zur Religion), Association in Religion (Über das Gesellige in der Religion, oder über Kirche und Priesterthum), and the Religions (Über die Religionen).

=== Defense (Apologie) ===
The Defense (Apologie) characterizes the four following speeches by Schleiermacher laying out of his anthropology of religion. He states, "[T]here are two points of view from which everything taking place in man or proceeding from him may be regarded. Considered from the centre outwards, that is according to its inner quality, it is an expression of human nature, based in one of its necessary modes of acting or impulses ... [R]egarded from the outside, according to the definite attitude and form it assumes in particular cases, it is a product of time and history."

== Legacy ==
Schleiermacher is perhaps best known outside of Germany for being the "father of modern Protestant theology", focusing his attention not on the institutional values of Christianity but on the nature of religious experience from the perspective of the individual and human nature itself, a product most of the prevalence of German Romanticism. The phrase "cultured despisers" has also seen reuse in scholarship since the authorship of On Religion in the late nineteenth century.

== Bibliography ==
- Mackintosh, Hugh Ross, Types of Modern Theology: Schleiermacher to Barth, New York: Charles Scribner's Sons (1937).
- Schleiermacher, Friedrich, On Religion: Speeches to its Cultured Despisers, trans. John Oman, New York: Harper & Brothers (1958).
