= Friedrich Schleiermacher =

German theologian, philosopher, and biblical scholar (1768–1834)

The Reverend Friedrich Schleiermacher
- Born: Friedrich Daniel Ernst Schleiermacher; 21 November 1768; Breslau, Prussian Silesia, Kingdom of Prussia, Holy Roman Empire
- Died: 12 February 1834 (aged 65); Berlin, Province of Brandenburg, Kingdom of Prussia
- Spouse: Henriette von Willich (m. 1809; died 1834)
- Children: 4

Education
- Education: University of Halle (attended)
- Academic advisors: Johann Augustus Eberhard; Johann Salomo Semler

Philosophical work
- Era: 18th-/19th-century philosophy
- Region: Western philosophy
- School: German idealism Jena Romanticism; Berlin Romanticism; Romantic hermeneutics Methodological hermeneutics
- Institutions: University of Halle (1804–07); University of Berlin (1810–34)
- Notable students: F. E. Beneke; August Böckh; Hermann Grassmann; F. A. Trendelenburg
- Main interests: Theology, psychology, New Testament exegesis, ethics (both philosophic and Christian), dogmatic and practical theology, dialectics (logic and metaphysics), politics
- Notable ideas: Hermeneutics as a cyclical process Personalism; Socratic problem

Friedrich Daniel Ernst Schleiermacher (/ˈʃlaɪərmɑːxər/; German: [ˈfʁiːdʁɪç ˈʃlaɪɐˌmaxɐ]; 21 November 1768 – 12 February 1834) was a German Reformed theologian, pastor, philosopher, and biblical scholar known for his attempt to reconcile the criticisms of the Enlightenment with traditional Protestant Christianity. He also became influential in the evolution of higher criticism, and his work forms part of the foundation of the modern field of hermeneutics. Because of his profound effect on subsequent Christian thought, he is often called the "Father of Modern Liberal Theology" and is considered an early leader in liberal Christianity. The neo-orthodoxy movement of the twentieth century, typically (though not without challenge) seen to be spearheaded by Karl Barth, was in many ways an attempt to challenge his influence. As a philosopher he was a leader of German Romanticism.

== Biography ==
=== Early life and development ===
Born in Breslau in Prussian Silesia as the grandson of Daniel Schleiermacher, a pastor at one time associated with the Zionites, and the son of Gottlieb Schleiermacher, a Reformed Church chaplain in the Prussian army, Schleiermacher started his formal education in a Moravian school at Niesky in Upper Lusatia, and at Barby near Magdeburg. However, pietistic Moravian theology failed to satisfy his increasing doubts, and his father reluctantly gave him permission to enter the University of Halle, which had already abandoned pietism and adopted the rationalist spirit of Christian Wolff and Johann Salomo Semler. As a theology student, Schleiermacher pursued an independent course of reading and neglected the study of the Old Testament and of Oriental languages. However, he attended the lectures of Semler and became acquainted with the techniques of historical criticism of the New Testament, and of Johann Augustus Eberhard from whom he acquired a love of the philosophy of Plato and Aristotle. At the same time, he studied the writings of Immanuel Kant and Friedrich Heinrich Jacobi and began to apply ideas from the Greek philosophers to a reconstruction of Kant's system.

Schleiermacher developed a deep-rooted skepticism as a student and soon rejected orthodox Christianity.

Brian Gerrish, a scholar of the works of Schleiermacher, wrote:

In a letter to his father, Schleiermacher drops the mild hint that his teachers fail to deal with those widespread doubts that trouble so many young people of the present day. His father misses the hint. He has himself read some of the skeptical literature, he says, and can assure Schleiermacher that it is not worth wasting time on. For six whole months there is no further word from his son. Then comes the bombshell. In a moving letter of 21 January 1787, Schleiermacher admits that the doubts alluded to are his own. His father has said that faith is the "regalia of the Godhead," that is, God's royal due.

Schleiermacher confessed: "Faith is the regalia of the Godhead, you say. Alas! dearest father, if you believe that without this faith no one can attain to salvation in the next world, nor to tranquility in this—and such, I know, is your belief—oh! then pray to God to grant it to me, for to me it is now lost. I cannot believe that he who called himself the Son of Man was the true, eternal God; I cannot believe that his death was a vicarious atonement."

=== Tutoring, chaplaincy and first works ===
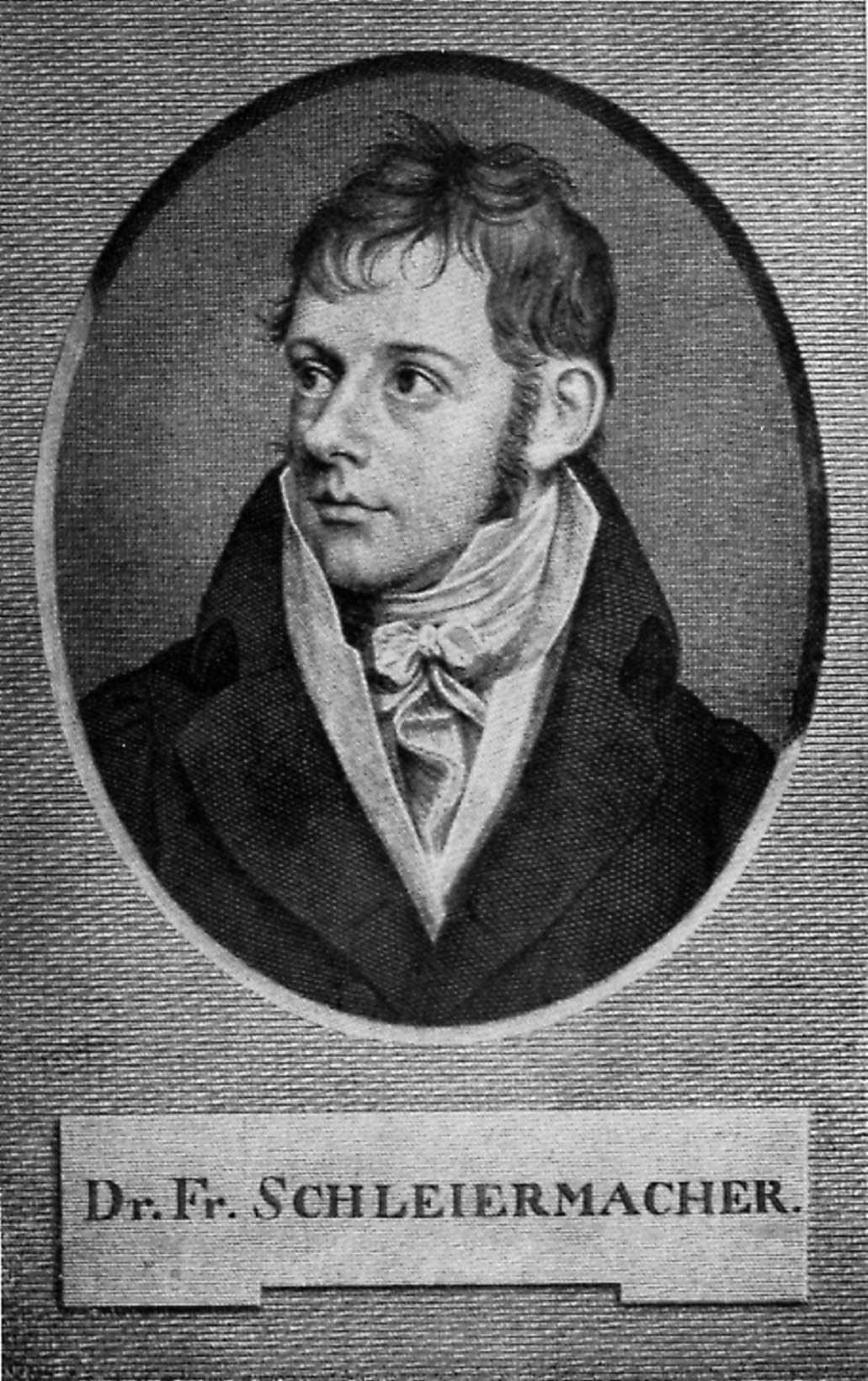
An engraving of Schleiermacher from his early adulthood

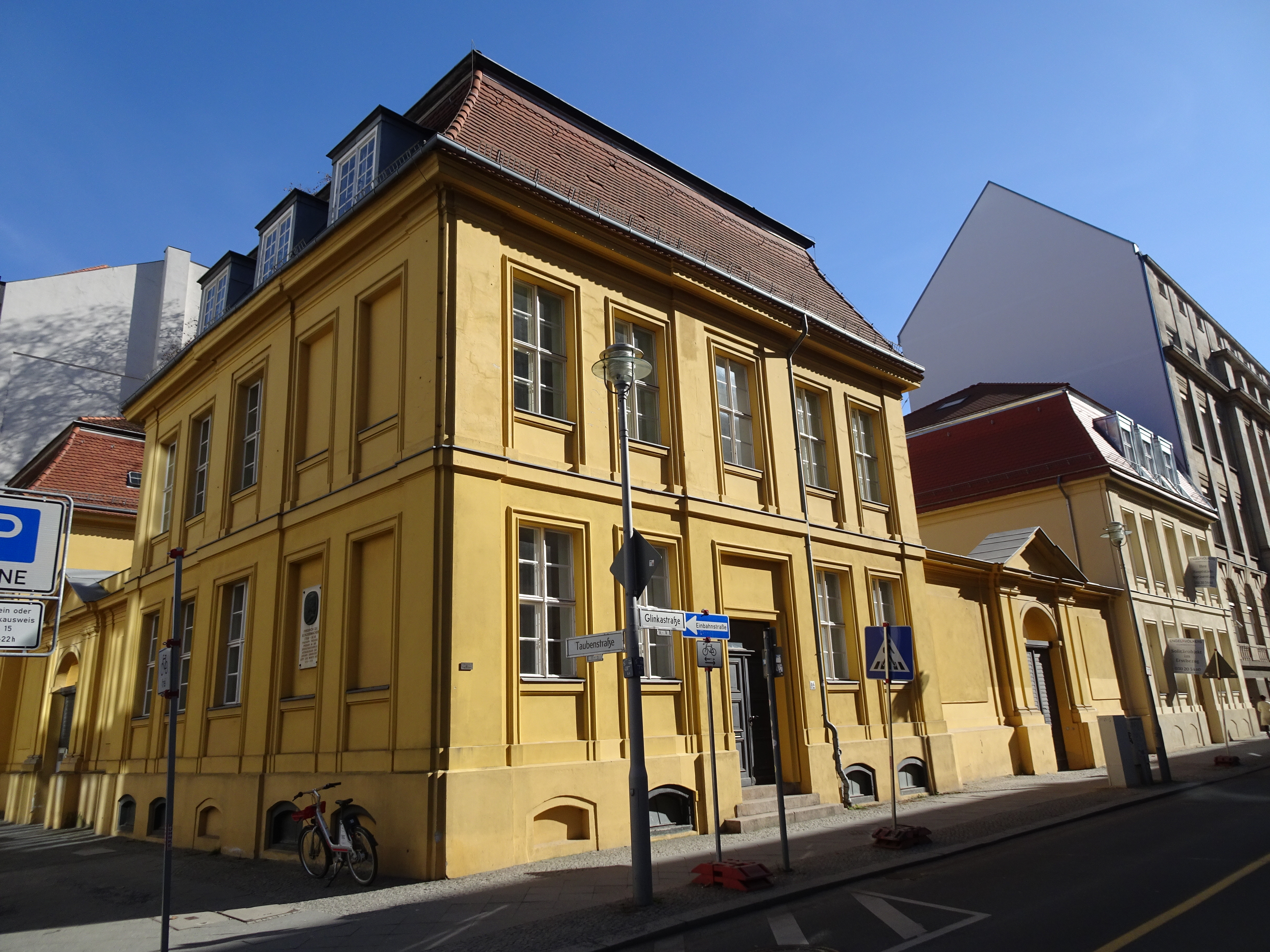
Schleiermacher-Haus in Berlin-Mitte, where he lived 1809 - 1816 while being pastor at the nearby Dreifaltigkeitskirche.

At the completion of his course at Halle, Schleiermacher became the private tutor to the family of Friedrich Alexander Burggraf und Graf zu Dohna-Schlobitten (1741–1810), developing in a cultivated and aristocratic household his deep love of family and social life.

Schleiermacher was ordained in 1794. Two years later, in 1796, he became chaplain to the Charité Hospital in Berlin. Lacking scope for the development of his preaching skills, he sought mental and spiritual satisfaction in the city's cultivated society and in intensive philosophical studies, beginning to construct the framework of his philosophical and religious system. Here Schleiermacher became acquainted with art, literature, science and general culture. He was strongly influenced by German Romanticism, as represented by his friend Karl Wilhelm Friedrich von Schlegel. That interest is borne out by his Confidential Letters on Schlegel's Lucinde as well as by his seven-year relationship (1798–1805) with Eleonore Christiane Grunow (née Krüger) (1769/1770–1837), the wife of Berlin clergyman August Christian Wilhelm Grunow (1764–1831).

Though his ultimate principles remained unchanged, he placed more emphasis on human emotion and the imagination. Meanwhile, he studied Spinoza and Plato, both of whom were important influences. He became more indebted to Kant though they differed on fundamental points. He sympathised with some of Jacobi's positions, and took some ideas from Fichte and Schelling. The literary product of that period of rapid development was his influential book, Reden über die Religion (On Religion: Speeches to Its Cultured Despisers), and his "new year's gift" to the new century, the Monologen (Soliloquies).

In the first book, Schleiermacher gave religion an unchanging place among the divine mysteries of human nature, distinguished it from what he regarded as current caricatures of religion and described the perennial forms of its manifestation. That established the programme of his subsequent theological system. In the Monologen, he revealed his ethical manifesto in which he proclaimed his ideas on the freedom and independence of the spirit and on the relationship of the mind to the sensual world, and he sketched his ideal of the future of the individual and of society.

=== Pastorship ===
From 1802 to 1804, Schleiermacher served as a pastor of a small Reformed church in the Pomeranian town of Stolp. He relieved Friedrich Schlegel entirely of his nominal responsibility for the translation of Plato, which they had together undertaken (vols. 1–5, 1804–1810; vol. 6, Repub. 1828). Another work, Grundlinien einer Kritik der bisherigen Sittenlehre [Outlines of a Critique of the Doctrines of Morality to date] (1803), the first of his strictly critical and philosophical productions, occupied him; it is a criticism of all previous moral systems, including those of Kant and Fichte: Plato's and Spinoza's find most favour. It contends that the tests of the soundness of a moral system are the completeness of its view of the laws and ends of human life as a whole and the harmonious arrangement of its subject-matter under one fundamental principle. Although it is almost exclusively critical and negative, the book announces Schleiermacher's later view of moral science, attaching prime importance to a Güterlehre, or doctrine of the ends to be obtained by moral action. The obscurity of the book's style and its negative tone prevented immediate success.

=== Professorship ===
In 1804, Schleiermacher moved to become university preacher and professor of theology to the University of Halle, where he remained until 1807. He quickly obtained a reputation as professor and preacher and exercised a powerful influence in spite of charges of atheism, Spinozism and pietism. In this period, he began his lectures on hermeneutics (1805–1833) and he also wrote his dialogue the Weihnachtsfeier (Christmas Eve: Dialogue on the Incarnation, 1806), which represents a midway point between his Speeches and his great dogmatic work, Der christliche Glaube (The Christian Faith); the speeches represent phases of his growing appreciation of Christianity as well as the conflicting elements of the theology of the period. After the Battle of Jena, he returned to Berlin (1807), was soon appointed pastor of the Trinity Church and, on 18 May 1809, married Henriette von Willich (née von Mühlenfels; 1788–1840), the widow of his friend Johann Ehrenfried Theodor von Willich (1777–1807).

At the foundation of the University of Berlin (1810), in which he took a prominent part, Schleiermacher obtained a theological chair and soon became secretary to the Prussian Academy of Sciences. He took a prominent part in the reorganization of the Prussian church and became the most powerful advocate of the union of the Lutheran and Reformed divisions of German Protestantism, paving the way for the Prussian Union of Churches (1817). The 24 years of his professional career in Berlin began with his short outline of theological study (Kurze Darstellung des theologischen Studiums, 1811) in which he sought to do for theology what he had done for religion in his Speeches.

While he preached every Sunday, Schleiermacher also gradually took up in his lectures in the university almost every branch of theology and philosophy: New Testament exegesis, introduction to and interpretation of the New Testament, ethics (both philosophic and Christian), dogmatic and practical theology, church history, history of philosophy, psychology, dialectics (logic and metaphysics), politics, pedagogy, aesthetics and translation.

In politics, Schleiermacher supported liberty and progress, and in the period of reaction that followed the overthrow of Napoleon, he was charged by the Prussian government with "demagogic agitation" in conjunction with the patriot Ernst Moritz Arndt.

At the same time, Schleiermacher prepared his chief theological work, Der christliche Glaube nach den Grundsätzen der evangelischen Kirche (1821–1822; 2nd ed., greatly altered, 1830–1831; 6th ed., 1884; The Christian faith according to the principles of the evangelical church). Its fundamental principle is that the source and the basis of dogmatic theology are the religious feeling, the sense of absolute dependence on God as communicated by Jesus through the church, not the creeds or the letter of Scripture or the rationalistic understanding. The work is therefore simply a description of the facts of religious feeling, or of the inner life of the soul in its relations to God, and the inward facts are looked at in the various stages of their development and presented in their systematic connection. The aim of the work was to reform Protestant theology, to put an end to the unreason and superficiality of both supernaturalism and rationalism, and to deliver religion and theology from dependence on perpetually changing systems of philosophy.

Though the work added to the reputation of its author, it aroused the increased opposition of the theological schools it was intended to overthrow, and at the same time, Schleiermacher's defence of the right of the church to frame its own liturgy in opposition to the arbitrary dictation of the monarch or his ministers brought him fresh troubles. He felt isolated although his church and his lecture-room continued to be crowded.

Schleiermacher continued with his translation of Plato and prepared a new and greatly-altered edition of his Christlicher Glaube, anticipating the latter in two letters to his friend Gottfried Lücke (in the Studien und Kritiken, 1829) in which he defended his theological position generally and his book in particular against opponents on both the right and the left.

The same year, Schleiermacher lost his only son, Nathaniel (1820–1829), a blow that he said "drove the nails into his own coffin", but he continued to defend his theological position against Hengstenberg's party and the rationalists Daniel Georg Konrad von Cölln (1788–1833) and David Schulz (1779–1854), protesting against both subscription to the ancient creeds and the imposition of a new rationalistic formulary.

=== Death ===
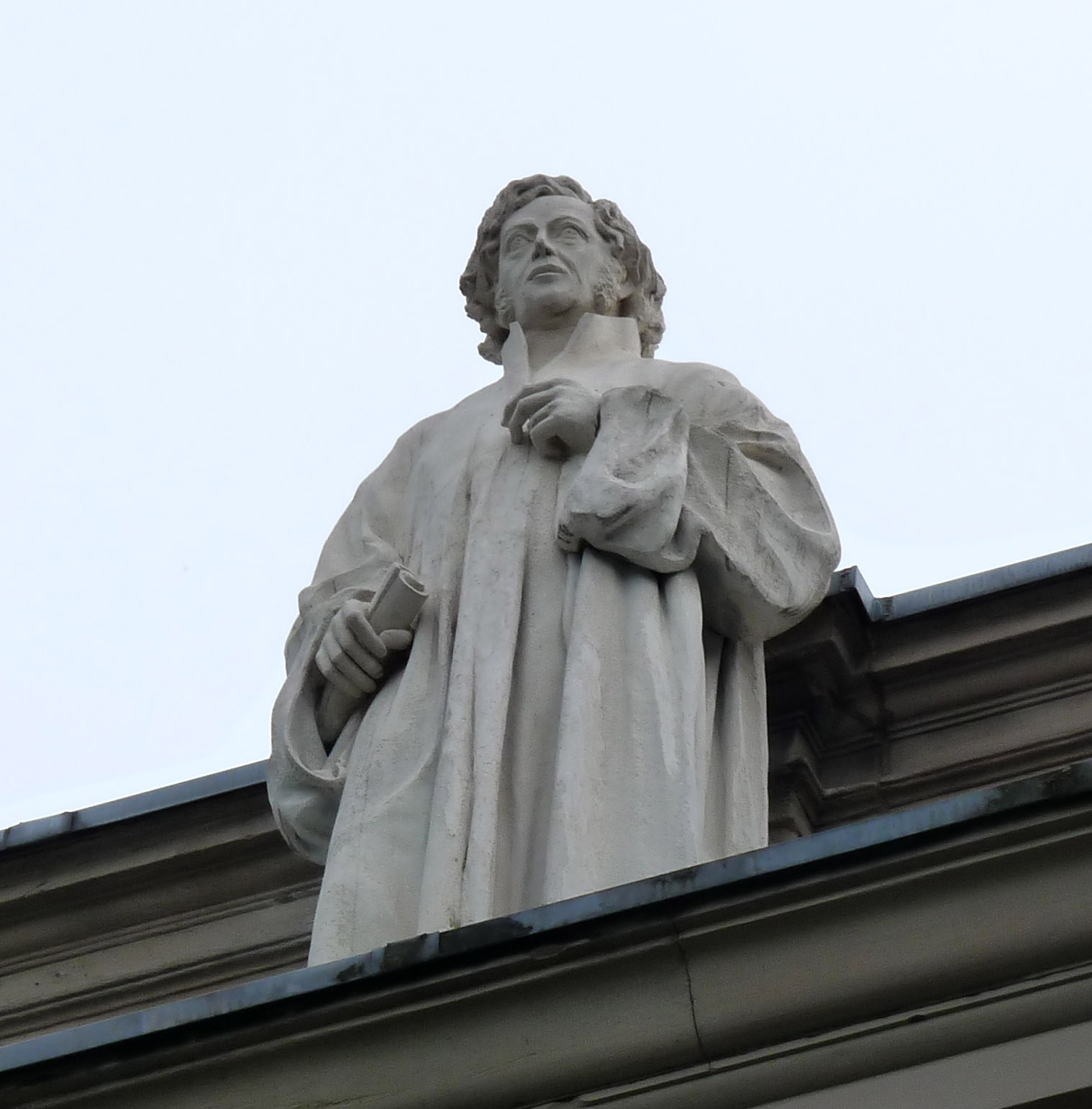
A statue of Schleiermacher at Palais Universitaire in Strasbourg

Schleiermacher died at 65 of pneumonia on 12 February 1834.

== Work ==
=== Doctrine of knowledge ===
Schleiermacher's psychology takes as its basis the phenomenal dualism of the ego and the non-ego, and regards the life of man as the interaction of these elements with their interpenetration as its infinite destination. The dualism is therefore not absolute, and, though present in man's own constitution as composed of body and soul, is relative only even there. The ego is itself both body and soul — the conjunction of both constitutes it. Our "organization" or sense nature has its intellectual element, and our "intellect" its organic element, and there is no such thing as "pure mind" or "pure body." The one general function of the ego, thought, becomes in relation to the non-ego either receptive or spontaneous action, and in both forms of action its organic, or sense, and its intellectual energies co-operate; and in relation to man, nature and the universe the ego gradually finds its true individuality by becoming a part of them, "every extension of consciousness being higher life."

The specific functions of the ego, as determined by the relative predominance of sense or intellect, are either functions of the senses (or organism) or functions of the intellect. The former fall into the two classes of feelings (subjective) and perceptions (objective); the latter, according as the receptive or the spontaneous element predominates, into cognition and volition. In cognition, thought is ontologically oriented to the object; and in volition it is the teleological purpose of thought. In the first case we receive (in our fashion) the object of thought into ourselves. In the latter we plant it out into the world. Both cognition and volition are functions of thought as well as forms of moral action.

It is in those two functions that the real life of the ego is manifested, but behind them is self-consciousness permanently present, which is always both subjective and objective — consciousness of ourselves and of the non-ego. This self-consciousness is the third special form or function of thought — which is also called feeling and immediate knowledge. In it we cognize our own inner life as affected by the non-ego. As the non-ego helps or hinders, enlarges or limits, our inner life, we feel pleasure or pain. Aesthetic, moral and religious feelings are respectively produced by the reception into consciousness of large ideas — nature, mankind and the world; those feelings are the sense of being one with these vast objects. Religious feeling therefore is the highest form of thought and of life; in it we are conscious of our unity with the world and God; it is thus the sense of absolute dependence.

Schleiermacher's doctrine of knowledge accepts the fundamental principle of Kant that knowledge is bounded by experience, but it seeks to remove Kant's skepticism as to knowledge of the ding an sich (the noumenon) or Sein, as Schleiermacher's term is. The idea of knowledge or scientific thought as distinguished from the passive form of thought — of aesthetics and religion — is thought which is produced by all thinkers in the same form and which corresponds to being. All knowledge takes the form of the concept (Begriff) or the judgment (Urteil), the former conceiving the variety of being as a definite unity and plurality, and the latter simply connecting the concept with certain individual objects.

In the concept, therefore, the intellectual and in the judgment the organic or sense element predominates. The universal uniformity of the production of judgments presupposes the uniformity of our relations to the outward world, and the uniformity of concepts rests similarly on the likeness of our inward nature. This uniformity is not based on the sameness of either the intellectual or the organic functions alone, but on the correspondence of the forms of thought and sensation with the forms of being. The essential nature of the concept is that it combines the general and the special, and the same combination recurs in being; in being the system of substantial or permanent forms answers to the system of concepts and the relation of cause and effect to the system of judgments, the higher concept answering to "force" and the lower to the phenomena of force, and the judgment to the contingent interaction of things.

The sum of being consists of the two systems of substantial forms and interactional relations, and it reappears in the form of concept and judgment, the concept representing being and the judgment being in action. Knowledge has under both forms the same object, the relative difference of the two being that when the conceptual form predominates we have speculative science and when the form of judgment prevails we have empirical or historical science. Throughout the domain of knowledge the two forms are found in constant mutual relations, another proof of the fundamental unity of thought and being or of the objectivity of knowledge. Plato, Spinoza and Kant had contributed characteristic elements of their thought to this system, and directly or indirectly it was largely indebted to Schelling for fundamental conceptions.

=== Hermeneutics ===
While Schleiermacher did not publish extensively on hermeneutics during his lifetime, he lectured widely on the field. His published and unpublished writings on the subject were collected together after his death and published in 1838 as Hermeneutik und Kritik mit besonderer Beziehung auf das Neue Testament. However, it was not until Heinz Kimmerle's 1959 edition "based on a careful transcription of the original handwritten manuscripts, that an assured and comprehensive overview of Schleiermacher's theory of hermeneutics became possible."

Schleiermacher wanted to shift hermeneutics away from specific methods of interpretation (e.g. methods for interpreting biblical or classical texts) and toward a focus on how people understand texts in general. He was interested in interpreting Scripture, but he thought one could do so properly only after establishing a system of interpretation that was applicable to all texts. This process was not a systematic or strictly philological approach, but what he called "the art of understanding." Schleiermacher viewed a text as a vehicle that an author used to communicate thoughts that he had had before creating the text. These thoughts were what caused the author to produce the text; at the moment of text creation, these "inner thoughts" become "outer expression" in language. In order to interpret a text, then, the interpreter must consider both the inner thoughts of the author and the language that s/he used in writing the text. In other words, the reader must submerge himself in the realities of the object of understanding (the text). This approach to interpreting texts involves both "grammatical interpretation" and "psychological (or technical) interpretation." The former deals with the language of the text; the latter with the thoughts, emotions, intentions and aims of the author.

The language used by an author "is what mediates sensuously and externally between utterer and listener". The ultimate goal of hermeneutics for Schleiermacher is "understanding in the highest sense"— experiencing the same thoughts that the author experienced when writing the text which he identified as submerging Understanding is a historical process involving learning about the context in which the author wrote, and how the text's original readership understood its language. Understanding is also a psychological process drawing upon intuition and a connection between interpreter and the author. Reader and author are both human. As humans, they have some degree of shared understanding. That shared understanding is what makes it possible for a reader to understand an author.

Part of the art of understanding is the art of avoiding misunderstanding. Schleiermacher identifies two forms of misunderstanding. Qualitative misunderstanding is a failure of grammatical interpretation— failing to understand the language of the text— "the confusion of the meaning of a word for another." Quantitative misunderstanding a failure of technical/psychological interpretation— misunderstanding the nuance in the author’s own "sphere."

In studying the language that an author uses to present his/her thoughts, an interpreter may be able to understand these thoughts even better than the author him/herself. This can be done by discovering why a particular work was produced, and by discovering unity within other works produced in a similar genre by others, or unity in other works by the same author in any genre.

Despite Schleiermacher’s claim to the possibility of understanding of the author’s thoughts better than the author, he grants that "good interpretation can only be approximated" and that hermeneutics is not a "perfect art." The art puts the interpreter in the best position by "putting oneself in possession of all the conditions of understanding." However, the extent of an interpreter’s understanding of a text is limited by the possibility of misunderstanding the text.

Schleiermacher's work had a profound impact on the field of hermeneutics, so much so that he is often referred to as "the father of modern hermeneutics as a general study." His work marks the beginning of hermeneutics as a general field of inquiry, separate from specific disciplines (e.g. law or theology). In the twentieth century, philosophers such as Heidegger, Gadamer, and Ricoeur would expand hermeneutics even further, from a theory of interpretation of textual expressions into a theory of interpretation of lived experiences.

=== Ethics ===
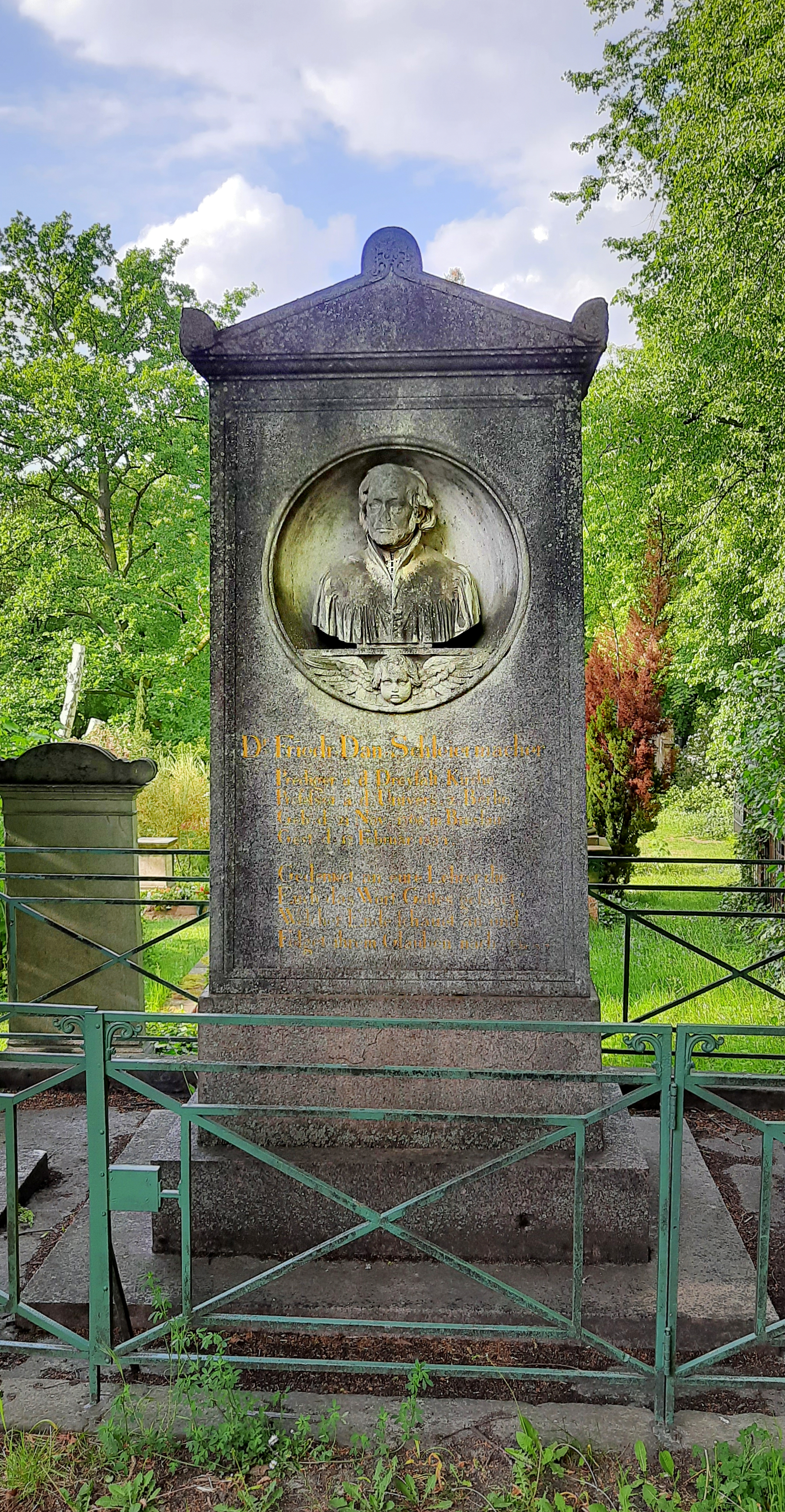
His grave in Berlin

Next to religion and theology, Schleiermacher devoted himself to the moral world, of which the phenomena of religion and theology were, in his systems, only constituent elements. In his earlier essays he endeavoured to point out the defects of ancient and modern ethical thinkers, particularly of Kant and Fichte, with only Plato and Spinoza finding favour in his eyes. He failed to discover in previous moral systems any necessary basis in thought, any completeness as regards the phenomena of moral action, any systematic arrangement of its parts and any clear and distinct treatment of specific moral acts and relations.

Schleiermacher's own moral system is an attempt to supply these deficiencies. It connects the moral world by a deductive process with the fundamental idea of knowledge and being; it offers a view of the entire world of human action which at all events aims at being exhaustive; it presents an arrangement of the matter of the science which tabulates its constituents after the model of the physical sciences; and it supplies a sharply defined treatment of specific moral phenomena in their relation to the fundamental idea of human life as a whole. Schleiermacher defines ethics as the theory of the nature of the reason, or as the scientific treatment of the effects produced by human reason in the world of nature and man.

As a theoretical or speculative science it is purely descriptive and not practical, being correlated on the one hand to physical science and on the other to history. Its method is the same as that of physical science, being distinguished from the latter only by its matter. The ontological basis of ethics is the unity of the real and the ideal, and the psychological and actual basis of the ethical process is the tendency of reason and nature to unite in the form of the complete organization of the latter by the former. The end of the ethical process is that nature (i.e. all that is not mind, the human body as well as external nature) may become the perfect symbol and organ of mind.

Conscience, as the subjective expression of the presupposed identity of reason and nature in their bases, guarantees the practicability of our moral vocation. Nature is preordained or constituted to become the symbol and organ of mind, just as mind is endowed with the impulse to realize this end. But the moral law must not be conceived under the form of an "imperative" or a "Sollen"; it differs from a law of nature only as being descriptive of the fact that it ranks the mind as conscious will, or Zweckdenken, above nature. Strictly speaking, the antitheses of good and bad and of free and necessary have no place in an ethical system, but simply in history, which is obliged to compare the actual with the ideal, but as far as the terms "good" and "bad" are used in morals they express the rule or the contrary of reason, or the harmony or the contrary of the particular and the general. The idea of free as opposed to necessary expresses simply the fact that the mind can propose to itself ends, though a man cannot alter his own nature.

In contrast to Kant and Fichte and modern moral philosophers, Schleiermacher reintroduced and assigned pre-eminent importance to the doctrine of the summum bonum, or highest good. It represents in his system the ideal and aim of the entire life of man, supplying the ethical view of the conduct of individuals in relation to society and the universe, and therewith constituting a philosophy of history at the same time. Starting with the idea of the highest good and of its constituent elements (Güter), or the chief forms of the union of mind and nature, Schleiermacher's system divides itself into the doctrine of moral ends, the doctrine of virtue and the doctrine of duties; in other words, as a development of the idea of the subjection of nature to reason it becomes a description of the actual forms of the triumphs of reason, of the moral power manifested therein and of the specific methods employed. Every moral good or product has a fourfold character: it is individual and universal; it is an organ and symbol of the reason, that is, it is the product of the individual with relation to the community, and represents or manifests as well as classifies and rules nature.

The first two characteristics provide for the functions and rights of the individual as well as those of the community or race. Though a moral action may have these four characteristics at various degrees of strength, it ceases to be moral if one of them is quite absent. All moral products may be classified according to the predominance of one or the other of these characteristics. Universal organizing action produces the forms of intercourse, and universal symbolizing action produces the various forms of science; individual organizing action yields the forms of property and individual symbolizing action the various representations of feeling, all these constituting the relations, the productive spheres, or the social conditions of moral action. Moral functions cannot be performed by the individual in isolation but only in his relation to the family, the state, the school, the church, and society — all forms of human life which ethical science finds to its hand and leaves to the science of natural history to account for. The moral process is accomplished by the various sections of humanity in their individual spheres, and the doctrine of virtue deals with the reason as the moral power in each individual by which the totality of moral products is obtained.

Schleiermacher classifies the virtues under the two forms of Gesinnung ("disposition, attitude") and Fertigkeit ("dexterity, proficiency"), the first consisting of the pure ideal element in action and the second the form it assumes in relation to circumstances, each of the two classes falling respectively into the two divisions of wisdom and love and of intelligence and application. In his system the doctrine of duty is the description of the method of the attainment of ethical ends, the conception of duty as an imperative, or obligation, being excluded, as we have seen. No action fulfills the conditions of duty except as it combines the three following antitheses: reference to the moral idea in its whole extent and likewise to a definite moral sphere; connection with existing conditions and at the same time absolute personal production; the fulfillment of the entire moral vocation every moment though it can only be done in a definite sphere. Duties are divided with reference to the principle that every man make his own the entire moral problem and act at the same time in an existing moral society. This condition gives four general classes of duty: duties of general association or duties with reference to the community (Rechtspflicht), and duties of vocation (Berufspflicht) — both with a universal reference, duties of the conscience (in which the individual is sole judge), and duties of love or of personal association.

It was only the first of the three sections of the science of ethics — the doctrine of moral ends — that Schleiermacher handled with approximate completeness; the other two sections were treated very summarily. In his Christian Ethics he dealt with the subject from the basis of the Christian consciousness instead of from that of reason generally; the ethical phenomena dealt with are the same in both systems, and they throw light on each other, while the Christian system treats more at length and less aphoristically the principal ethical realities — church, state, family, art, science and society. Rothe, amongst other moral philosophers, bases his system substantially, with important departures, on Schleiermacher's. In Beneke's moral system his fundamental idea was worked out in its psychological relations.

Schleiermacher held that an eternal hell was not compatible with the love of God. Divine punishment was rehabilitative, not penal, and designed to reform the person. He was one of the first major theologians of modern times to teach Christian Universalism.

=== Writings concerning society ===
On Religion: Speeches to its Cultured Despisers is a book written by Schleiermacher dealing with the gap he saw as emerging between the cultural elite and general society. Schleiermacher was writing when the Enlightenment was in full swing and when the first major transition into modernity was simultaneously occurring. With the fall of the late Middle Ages and a vigorous discourse taking hold of Western European intellectuals, the fields of art and natural philosophy were flourishing. However, the discourse of theologians, arguably the primary and only discourse of intellectuals for centuries, had taken to its own now minor corner in the universities. On Religion is divided into five major sections: the Defense (Apologie), the Nature of Religion (Über das Wesen der Religion), the Cultivation of Religion (Über die Bildung zur Religion), Association in Religion (Über das Gesellige in der Religion, oder über Kirche und Priesterthum), and the Religions (Über die Religionen). Schleiermacher initiates his speeches on religion in its opening chapter by asserting that the contemporary critique of religion is often over-simplified by the assumption that there are two supposed "hinges" upon which all critiques of religion(s) are based. These two over-simplifications are given by Schleiermacher as first, that their conscience shall be put into judgement, and second, the "general idea turns on the fear of an eternal being, or, broadly, respect for his influence on the occurrences of this life called by you providence, or expectation of a future life after this one, called by you immortality."

=== Religious thought ===
From Leibniz, Lessing, Fichte, Jacobi and the Romantic school, Schleiermacher had imbibed a profound and mystical view of the inner depths of the human personality. His religious thought found its expression most notably in The Christian Faith, one of the most influential works of Christian theology of its time.

Schleiermacher saw the ego, the person, as an individualization of universal reason; and the primary act of self-consciousness as the first conjunction of universal and individual life, the immediate union or marriage of the universe with incarnated reason. Thus every person becomes a specific and original representation of the universe and a compendium of humanity, a microcosmos in which the world is immediately reflected. While therefore we cannot, as we have seen, attain the idea of the supreme unity of thought and being by either cognition or volition, we can find it in our own personality, in immediate self-consciousness or (which is the same in Schleiermacher's terminology) feeling. Feeling in this higher sense (as distinguished from "organic" sensibility, Empfindung), which is the minimum of distinct antithetic consciousness, the cessation of the antithesis of subject and object, constitutes likewise the unity of our being, in which the opposite functions of cognition and volition have their fundamental and permanent background of personality and their transitional link. Having its seat in this central point of our being, or indeed consisting in the essential fact of self-consciousness, religion lies at the basis of all thought, feeling and action.

At various periods of his life Schleiermacher used different terms to represent the character and relation of religious feeling. In his earlier days he called it a feeling or intuition of the universe, consciousness of the unity of reason and nature, of the infinite and the eternal within the finite and the temporal. In later life he described it as the feeling of absolute dependence, or, as meaning the same thing, the consciousness of being in relation to God. In his Addresses on Religion (1799), he wrote:

Religion is the outcome neither of the fear of death, nor of the fear of God. It answers a deep need in man. It is neither a metaphysic, nor a morality, but above all and essentially an intuition and a feeling. ... Dogmas are not, properly speaking, part of religion: rather it is that they are derived from it. Religion is the miracle of direct relationship with the infinite; and dogmas are the reflection of this miracle. Similarly belief in God, and in personal immortality, are not necessarily a part of religion; one can conceive of a religion without God, and it would be pure contemplation of the universe; the desire for personal immortality seems rather to show a lack of religion, since religion assumes a desire to lose oneself in the infinite, rather than to preserve one's own finite self.

Schleiermacher's concept of church has been contrasted with J. S. Semler's.

== Reception ==
The Dutch Reformed theologian Herman Bavinck, deeply concerned with the problem of objectivism and subjectivism in the doctrine of revelation, employs Schleiermacher’s doctrine of revelation in his own way and regards the Bible as the objective standard for his theological work. Bavinck also stresses the importance of the church, which forms the Christian consciousness and experience. In so doing, he attempts to overcome the latent weakness of Schleiermacher’s doctrine of revelation through his emphasis on the ecclesiological doctrine of revelation.

== Legacy ==
- Asteroid 12694 Schleiermacher is named for this German theologian—the name was chosen by German astronomer Freimut Börngen.
- In the Berlin-Kreuzberg district, Schleiermacherstrasse was named after him in 1875; an area in which the streets were named after the founding professors of the Berlin University.

== Works ==
Under the title Gesamtausgabe der Werke Schleiermachers in drei Abteilungen, Schleiermacher's works were first published in three sections:

1. Theological (11 vols.)
2. Sermons (10 vols., 1873–1874, 5 vols)
3. Philosophical and Miscellaneous (9 vols., 1835–1864).

See also Sämmtliche Werke (Berlin, 1834ff.), and Werke: mit einem Bildnis Schleiermachers (Leipzig, 1910) in four volumes.

Other works include:

- Pädagogische Schriften (3rd ed., 1902).
- Aus Schleiermachers Leben in Briefen (Berlin, 1858–1863, in 4 vols., correspondence).
- Leben Schleiermachers. Vol. 1. Ed. Wilhelm Dilthey. Berlin: Reimer, 1870. (Correspondence from 1768–1804).
  - The Life of Schleiermacher as Unfolded in His Autobiography and Letters. Vol. 1 and Vol. 2. Tr. F. Rowan. London: 1860.
- Friedrich Schleiermacher, ein Lebens- und Charakterbild. D. Schenkel, 1868 (based on selection of letters).

Modern editions:

- Brief Outline for the Study of Theology (Kurze Darstellung des theologischen Studiums zum Behuf einleitender Vorlesungen, 1830).
  - 1850 text tr. by William Farrer, Edinburgh.
  - 1966 text tr. by Terrence Tice, Richmond, VA.
- The Christian Faith in Outline (2nd ed. of Der Christliche Glaube, 1830–1).
  - 1911 condensed presentation tr. and ed. by George Cross, The Theology of Friedrich Schleiermacher. Chicago: University of Chicago Press, 1911.
  - 1922 outline tr. by D. M. (Donald Macpherson) Baillie, Edinburgh: T. & T. Clark.
  - 1999 text tr. by H. R. MacKintosh, ed. J. S. Stewart. Edinburgh: T. & T. Clark. Paperback: ISBN 0-567-08709-3.
- Christmas Eve: A Dialogue on the Incarnation (Die Weihnachtsfeier: Ein Gespräch, 1826).
  - 1890 text tr. by W. Hastie, Edinburgh: T. & T. Clark.
  - 1967 text tr. by Terrence Tice, Richmond, VA: Scholars Press.
- Dialectic, or, The Art of Doing Philosophy: A Study Edition of the 1811 Notes (Schleiermachers Dialektik, 1903). Tr. Terrence Tice. Atlanta, GA: Scholars Press, 2000. Paperback: ISBN 0-7885-0293-X
- Fifteen Sermons of Friedrich Schleiermacher Delivered to Celebrate the Beginning of a New Year (Monologues, 1800), tr. Edwina G. Lawler, Lewiston, New York: Edwin Mellen Press, 2003. hardcover: ISBN 0-7734-6628-2
- Selected Sermons of Schleiermacher. Tr. Mary F. Wilson. London: Hodder and Stoughton, 1890.
- Schleiermacher's Introductions to the Dialogues of Plato, trans. William Dobson. 1836; reprint, New York: Arno Press, 1973; reprint, Charleston, SC: BiblioBazaar, 2009. Paperback: ISBN 1-116-55546-8.
- Lectures on Philosophical Ethics (Grundriss der philosophischen Ethik, 1841). Tr. Louise Adey Huish. Cambridge: Cambridge University Press, 2002. Paperback: ISBN 0-521-00767-4
- The Life of Jesus, tr. S. Maclean Gilmour. Sigler Press 1997. Paperback: ISBN 1-888961-04-X
- A Critical Essay on the Gospel of Luke (Űber die Schriften des Lukas: ein kritischer Versuch, 1817). London: Taylor, 1825.
- Hermeneutics and Criticism and Other Writings (Hermeneutik und Kritik mit besonderer Beziehung auf das Neue Testament, 1838). Tr. Andrew Bowie. Cambridge University Press, 1998 Paperback: ISBN 0-521-59848-6
- Hermeneutics: The Handwritten Manuscripts, Ed. Heinz Kimmerle. Tr. James O. Duke and Jack Forstman. Atlanta, GA: Scholars Press, 1977 Paperback ISBN 0-89130-186-0
- On Creeds, Confessions And Church Union: "That They May Be One", tr. Iain G. Nicol. Lewiston, New York: Edwin Mellen Press, 2004. hardcover: ISBN 0-7734-6464-6
- On Freedom, trans. A. L. Blackwell. Lewiston, New York: Edwin Mellen Press, 1992.
- On the Glaubenslehre: Two Letters to Dr. Lucke (Schleiermachers Sendschreiben über seine Glaubenslehre an Lücke). Tr. James O. Duke and Francis Fiorenza. Atlanta, GA: Scholars Press, 1981.
- On the Highest Good, trans. H. V. Froese. Lewiston, New York: Edwin Mellen Press, 1992.
- On Religion: Speeches to its Cultured Despisers (Über die Religion: Reden an die Gebildeten unter ihren Verächtern, three editions: 1799, 1806, 1831)
  - 1799 text tr. Richard Crouter, Cambridge: Cambridge University Press, 1996. Paperback: ISBN 0-521-47975-4
  - 1893 text tr. by John Oman, Louisville: Westminster John Knox Press, 1994. Paperback: ISBN 0-664-25556-6
- On the Worth of Life (Über den Wert des Lebens), trans. E. Lawlor, T. N. Tice. Lewiston, New York: Edwin Mellen Press, 1995.
- Soliloquies, trans. Horace L. Friess. Chicago, 1957.
- Toward a Theory of Sociable Conduct and Essays in Its Intellectual-Cultural Context, tr. Ruth Drucilla Richardson. Lewiston, New York: Edwin Mellen Press, 1996 hardcover: ISBN 0-7734-8938-X
- Selected Sermons of Schleiermacher, tr. Mary F. Wilson. Wipf & Stock Publishers, 2004. Paperback: ISBN 1-59244-602-7
- Winkler, M., Beljan, J., Ehrhardt, Ch., Meier, D., Virmond, W., Vorlesungen über die Pädagogik und amtliche Voten zum öffentlichen Unterricht. Friedrich Schleiermacher Kritische Gesamtausgabe, Abteiling II: Vorlesungen, Band 12, Berlin / New York, Walter de Gruyter, 2017

== See also ==
- Allegorical interpretations of Plato, for Schleiermacher's influential Plato interpretation
- First Alcibiades
- Fidelity vs. transparency
- Hermeneutic circle
- Plato's unwritten doctrines, for the reaction against Schleiermacher's Plato interpretation
