= Ehrenfried von Willich =

Protestant chaplain (1777–1807)

Ehrenfried von Willich (5 September 1777– 2 February 1807) full name: Johann Ehrenfried Theodor von Willich) was a Protestant chaplain at the Swedish Queen's Regiment in Stralsund.

== Life ==
Ehrenfried von Willich was from a family of theologians from the Margraviate of Brandenburg. He was born in Sagard on the island of Rügen, the son of the pastor Philipp Philipp von Willich (1720–1787) and half-brother of the country doctor Moritz von Willich (1750–1810), the first country physician in Swedish Pomerania.

At first Willich was the tutor and business-partner of Wilhelm Graf von Schwerin-Putzar in Prenzlau. From the spring of 1803 he was a chaplain in the Queen's Regiment in Stralsund, which at that time belonged to Swedish Pomerania.

In 1803 Willich became engaged to Henriette von Mühlenfels (1788–1840), who was just 15 years old and had been an orphan for two years. She was daughter of the royal Prussian lieutenant-colonel Friedrich Gottlieb von Mühlenfels († 1801), a Squire on Sissow (today part of Gustow, island of Rügen), and of Pauline of Campagne. She was 16 by the time he married her on 5 September 1804. This marriage produced two children: Henriette (1805–1886) and Ehrenfried von Willich (1807–1880).

Almost two months before the birth of his eponymous son, while Napoleon's troops were besieging Stralsund (see Coalition Wars), Willich died of nerve fever (typhus), which at that time was rampant in the city.

Since May 1801 Willich had been a close friend and correspondent of the theologian Friedrich Schleiermacher. In 1809, two years after Willich's death, Schleiermacher married Willich's widow, the now 21-year-old Henriette.
