= Friedrich Eduard Beneke =

German psychologist and philosopher (1798–1854)

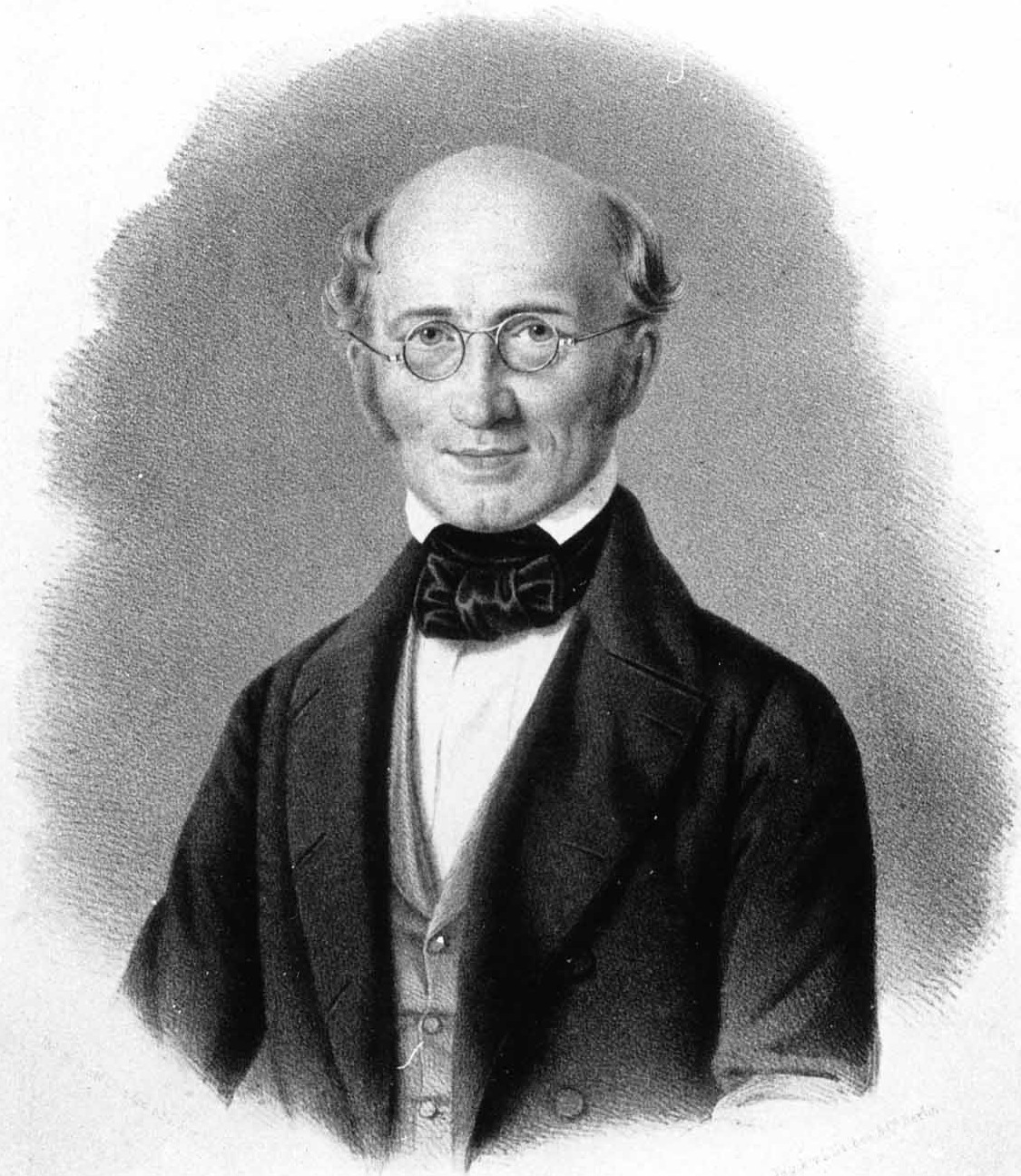
- Born: 17 February 1798; Berlin, Prussia, Holy Roman Empire
- Died: c. 1 March 1854 (aged 56); Berlin, Prussia, German Confederation

Education
- Education: University of Berlin
- Academic advisors: Friedrich Schleiermacher; W. M. L. de Wette

Philosophical work
- Era: 19th-century philosophy
- Region: Western philosophy
- School: Post-Kantianism
- Institutions: University of Berlin; University of Göttingen
- Main interests: Metaphysics; Psychology; Philosophical logic Ethics
- Notable ideas: Belief in the deduction of ethical principles from a basis of empirical feeling

Friedrich Eduard Beneke (German: [ˈbeːnəkə]; 17 February 1798 – c. 1 March 1854) was a German psychologist and post-Kantian philosopher.

== Life ==
Beneke was born in Berlin. He studied at the universities of Halle and Berlin, and served as a volunteer in the War of 1815. After studying theology under Schleiermacher and de Wette, he turned to pure philosophy, studying English writers and the German modifiers of Kantianism, such as Jacobi, Fries and Schopenhauer. In 1820, he published Erkenntnisslehre, Erfahrungsseelenlehre als Grundlage alles Wissens, and his inaugural dissertation De Veris Philosophiae Initiis. His marked opposition to the philosophy of Hegel, then dominant in Berlin, was shown more clearly in the short tract, Neue Grundlegung zur Metaphysik (1822), intended to be the programme for his lectures as Privatdozent, and in the able treatise, Grundlegung zur Physik der Sitten (1822), written, in direct antagonism to Kant's Metaphysics of Morals, to deduce ethical principles from a basis of empirical feeling. In 1822 his lectures were prohibited at Berlin, because of the influence of Hegel with the Prussian authorities, who also prevented him from obtaining a chair from the Saxon government. He retired to Göttingen, lectured there for several years, and was then allowed to return to Berlin. In 1832 he received an appointment as professor extraordinarius at the university, which he continued to hold till his death. On 1 March 1854 he disappeared, and more than two years later his remains were found in the canal near Charlottenburg. There was some suspicion that he had committed suicide in a fit of mental depression.

== Work in psychology ==
The distinctive features of Beneke's system are the firmness with which he maintained that in empirical psychology is to be found the basis of all philosophy, and his rigid treatment of mental phenomena by the genetic method. According to Beneke, the perfected mind is a development from simple elements, and the first problem of philosophy is the determination of these elements and of the processes by which the development takes place. In his Neue Psychologie (essays iii., viii. and ix.), he defined his position with regard to his predecessors and contemporaries. This and the introduction to his Lehrbuch signaled the two great stages in the progress of psychology: the negation of innate ideas by John Locke, and the negation of faculties, in the ordinary acceptation of the term, by Herbart. The next step was his own; he insisted that psychology must be treated as one of the natural sciences. As is the case with them, its content is given by experience alone, and differs from theirs only in being the object of the internal as opposed to the external sense. But by this Beneke in no wise meant a psychology founded on physiology. These two sciences, in his opinion, had quite distinct provinces and gave no mutual assistance. Just as little help is to be expected from the science of the body as from mathematics and metaphysics, both of which had been pressed by Herbart into the service of psychology. The true method of study is that applied with so much success in the physical sciences: critical examination of the given experience, and reference of it to ultimate causes, which may not be perceived, but are nevertheless hypotheses necessary to account for the facts.

== Bibliography ==
Beneke was a prolific writer, and besides the works mentioned above, published large treatises in several departments of philosophy, both pure and as applied to education and ordinary life. A complete list of his writings will be found in the appendix to Dressier's edition of the Lehrbuch der Psychologie als Naturwissenschaft (1861). The chief ones are:

- Psychologische Skizzen (1825, 1827)
- Lehrbuch der Psychologie (1832)
- Metaphysik und Religionsphilosophie (1840)
- Die neue Psychologie (1845)
- Pragmatische Psychologie oder Seelenlehre in der Anwendung auf das Leben (1832).
