= Johann Elias Haid =

German engraver (1739–1809)

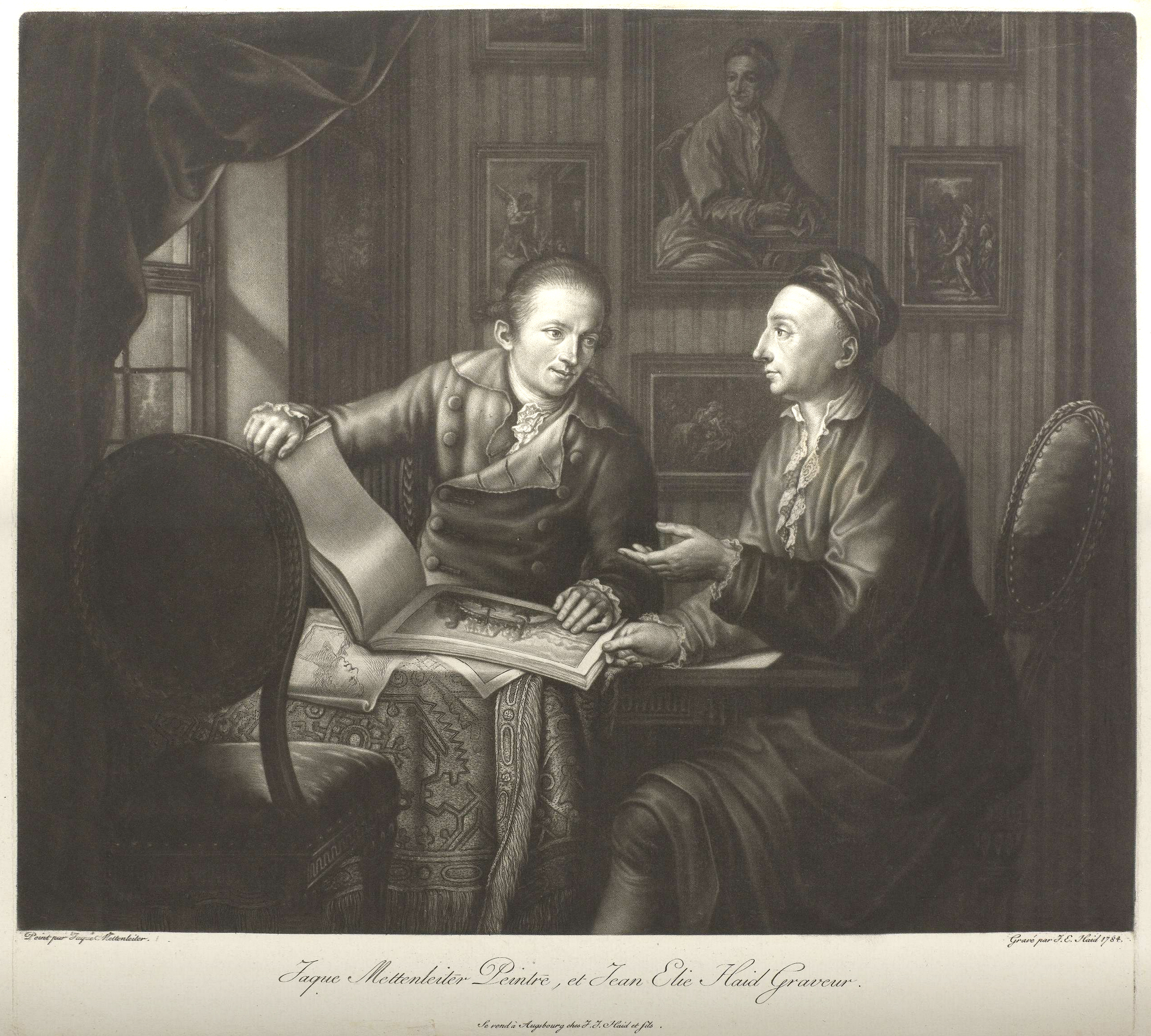
Johann Elias Haid (right) with the painter Johann Jacob Mettenleiter

Johann Elias Haid or Hayd (1739, Augsburg – 5 April 1809, Augsburg) was a German engraver and portraitist.

== Biography ==
His father was the engraver Johann Jacob Haid, who was also his first teacher and collaborator. Upon his father's death. he took over managing the family's publishing business: "Johann Jakob Haid & Sohn"

In 1768, he was awarded first prize in a competition held by the Fakultät für Gestaltung der Hochschule Augsburg. From 1786 to 1808, he served as their Protestant Director. Offices there were all divided by religion and the Catholic Director at that time was Johann Joseph Anton Huber.

In 1774, he began a series of portrait engravings devoted to famous scholars. This project occupied him until 1790, and eventually included 57 portraits.

From 1778, he worked on engraving 132 designs by Johann Caspar Füssli, for the book Des Ritters Johann Carl Hedlinger's Medaillen-Werk, which was published in 1781. This was considered to be a patriotic act, and aroused much interest in southern Germany.

Among his numerous illustrations for scientific books are those for British Zoology by Thomas Pennant and the plates for several works by the botanist, Georg Dionysius Ehret. Some of these have been attributed to his father.

Although specializing in portraits, he also created engravings of works by noted 16th and 17th century artists such as Frans van Mieris, Bernardo Strozzi and Lucas Cranach, as well as a few by Rembrandt.

== Selected engravings ==
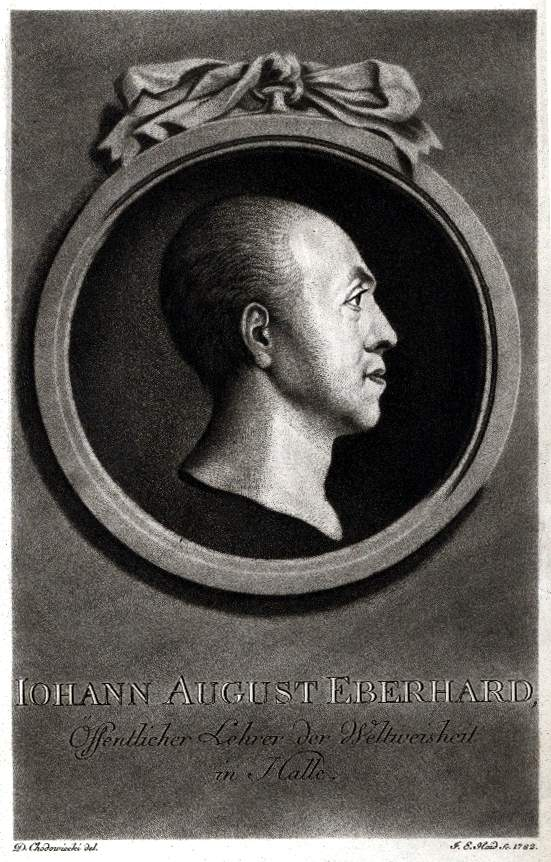
Johann August Eberhard

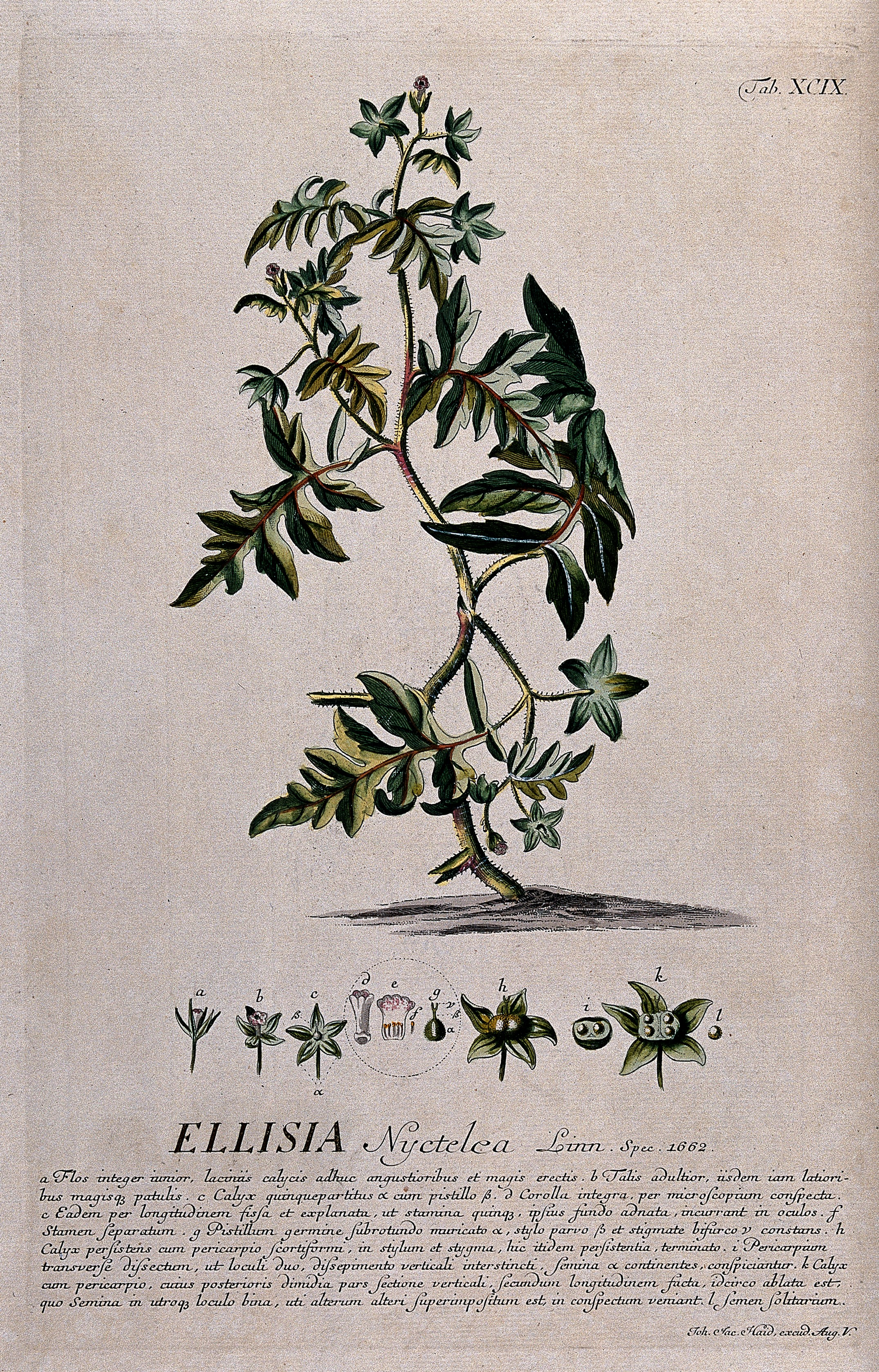
Ellisia nyctelea

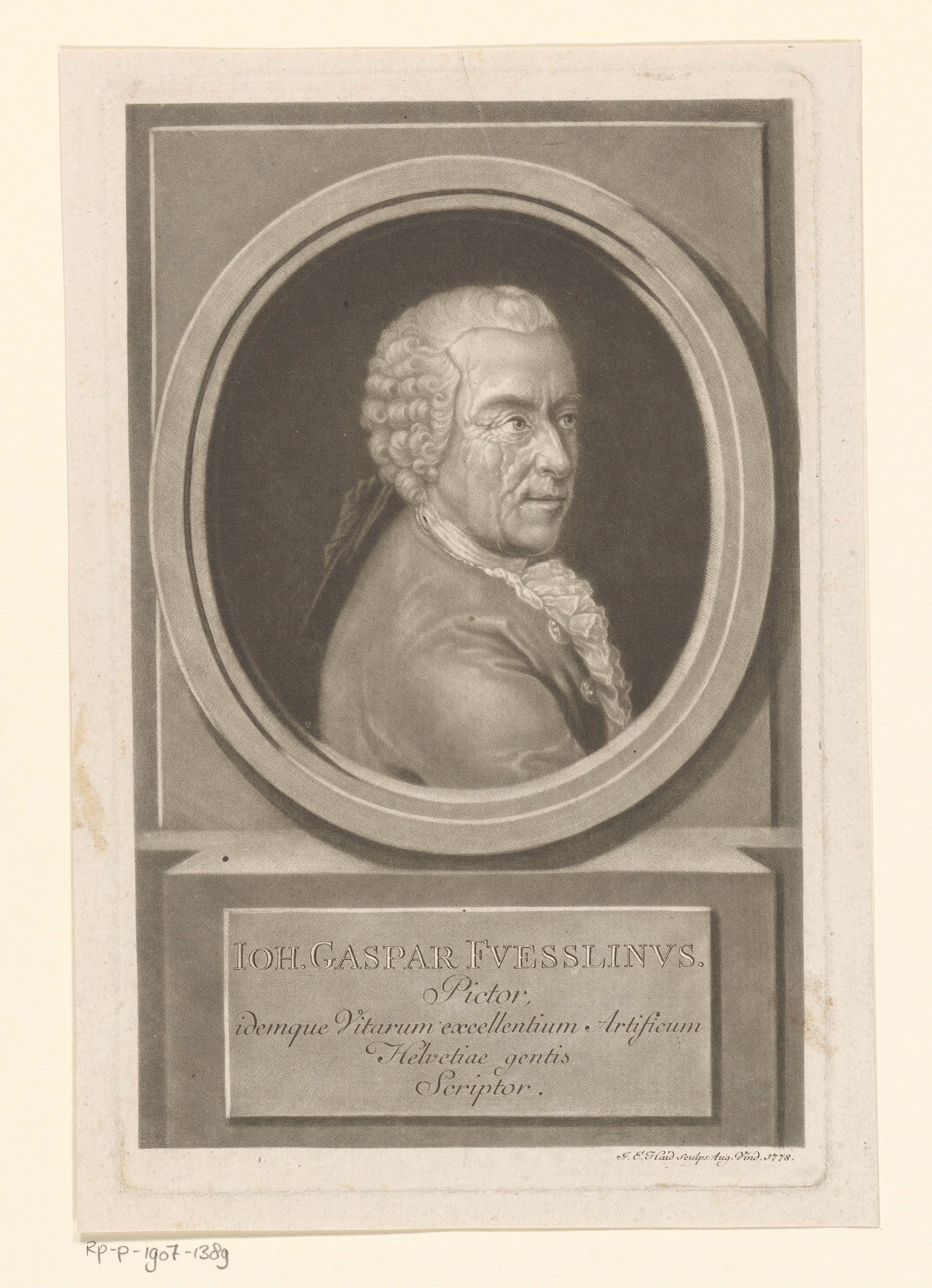
Johann Caspar Füssli

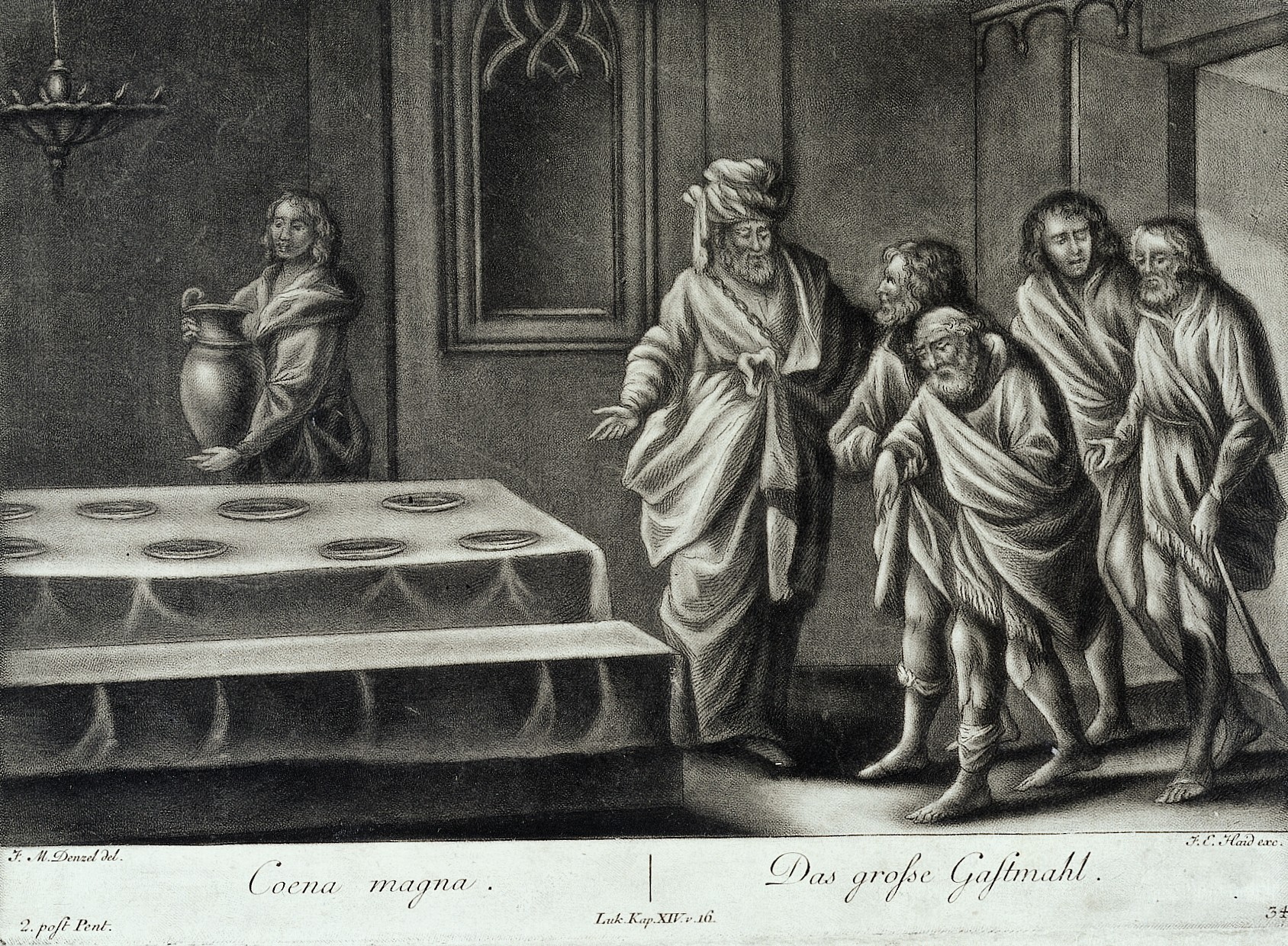
The Halt and the Blind Being Invited to the Great Banquet

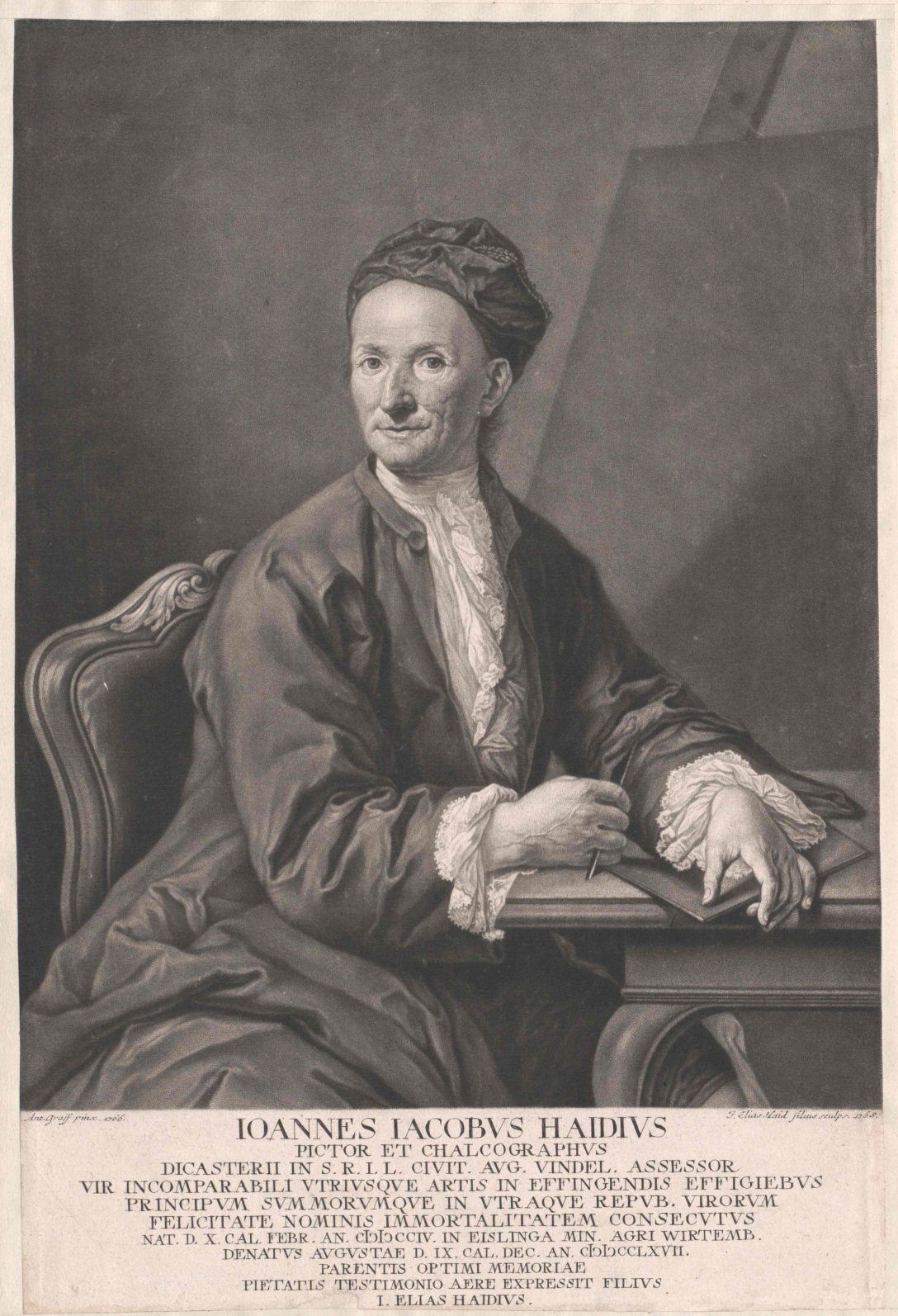
Portrait of his father

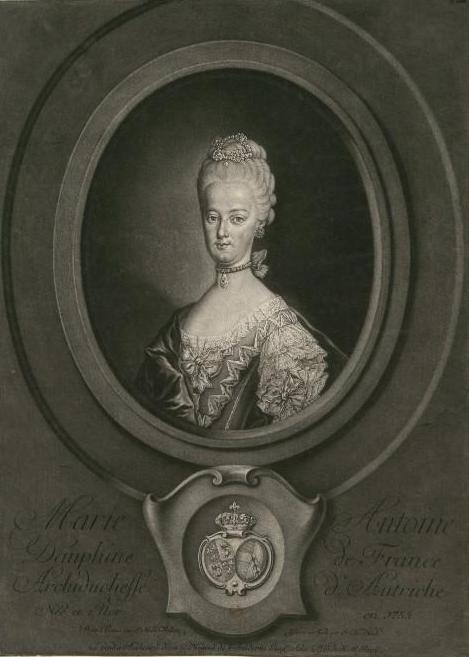
Marie Antoinette

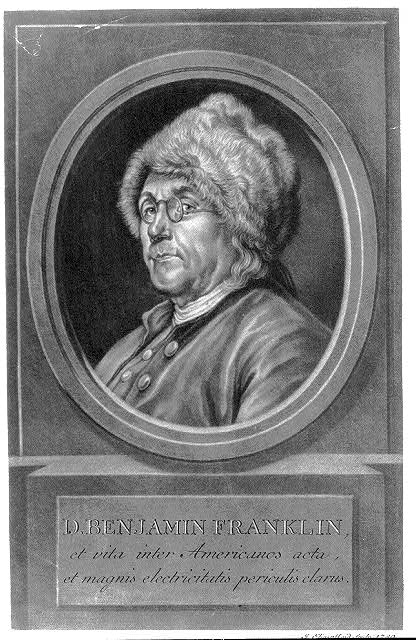
Benjamin Franklin
