= Johann Elias Ridinger =

German painter (1698–1767)

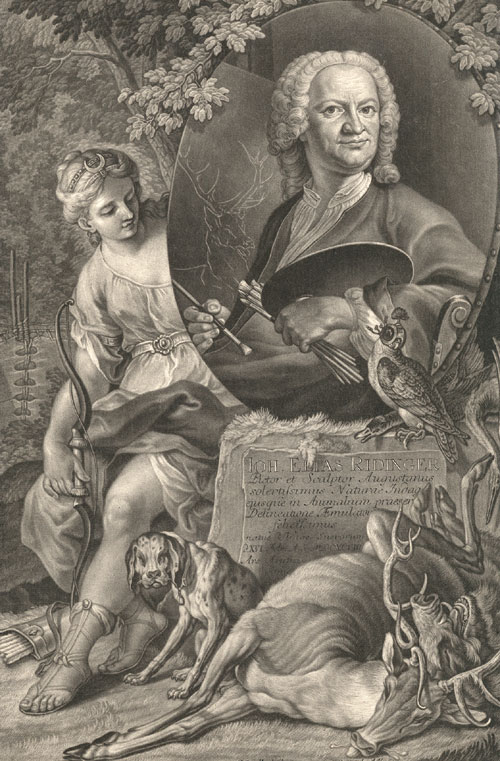
A mezzotint of Johann Elias Ridinger in c. 1750

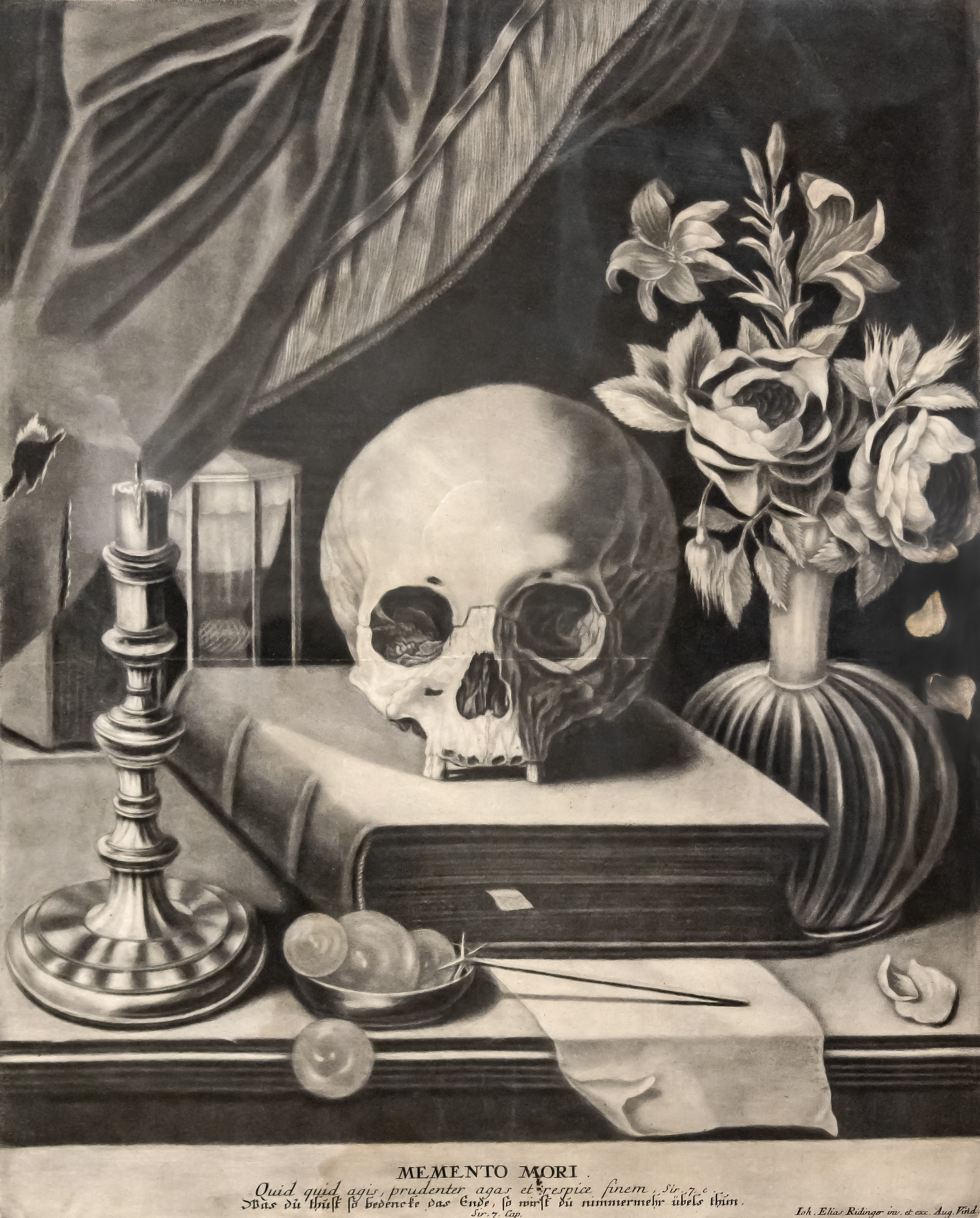
Memento mori Musée des Arts Décoratifs, Paris

Johann Elias Ridinger (16 February 1698 in Ulm – 10 April 1767 in Augsburg) was a German painter, engraver, draughtsman and publisher. He is considered one of the most famous German engravers of animals, particularly horses, hounds and hunting scenes. His art was also depicted on Meissen porcelain giving wide recognition in his time.

== Life and work ==
Ridinger was born in Ulm in a family of artists. His father Johann Daniel (1656 – c. 1737) was a scribe married to Regina Catharina Miller (1663–1703). He began his training in Ulm with the painter Christoph Resch (1701–1716). Resch gave his students the menial tasks of painting wax models but trained them on perspective, geometry and architecture. Ridinger later studied under Johann Falch (1687–1727) in Augsburg. He learned the art of engraving from Georg Philipp Rugendas. On the recommendation of Gabriel Spitzel he worked for Wolf, Freiherr von Metternich (1706–1731), he spent three years in Regensburg: his coursing and visits to the riding school there proved decisive for his development. His engraved, etched and scratched sheets show the animals in characteristic movements and positions in a landscape environment. The ornamental movements in his works show visibly Rococo stylistic tendencies. He returned to Augsburg and studied engraving and etching under Georg Philipp Rugendas the Elder (1666–1742). Ridinger married Jacobina zur Helle, the widow of his friend Johannes Seuter in 1723 and shortly after founded his own art publishing house in Augsburg, where most of his works appeared. In 1757 he worked as an assessor at the Protestant Marriage Court and in 1759 he became the director of the Augsburg Stadtakademie. Nearly 1,600 prints were produced by his firm of which 1,200 depict animals. His drawings were often executed with precision and taste and hence his work was held in high esteem and was also transferred to decoration, porcelain and ceramics. He died from a stroke at the age of 69. His sons Martin Elias and Johann Jakob continued to produce prints from his original copperplates.

Ridinger's life is known thanks to a manuscript biography written in 1764. This manuscript was owned by Rudolph Weigel (1804–1867) in Leipzig and was published in 1766. Ridinger's son also wrote a biography of their father. Georg August Wilhelm Thienemann (1781–1863) wrote another major biography.

== Literature ==
- Peter Prange (2003). "Ridinger, Johann Elias". Neue Deutsche Biographie (in German). Vol. 21. Berlin: Duncker & Humblot. p. 555. (full text online).
- Ign. Schwarz: Katalog einer Ridinger-Sammlung. (Sammlung Rudolf Ritter von Gutmann.) Vienna 1910.
- erlebnis ridinger 1698-1998. Dem über die Jahrhunderte hinweg triumphierenden Meister und seinen Freunden zum 300. Geburtstag. Jubilée publication. 1998
- Lüder H. Niemeyer: Dresdner Rede. Der verharmloste Ridinger, 27 April 1998
- Lüder H. Niemeyer: Die Vanitas-Graphik von Johann Elias Ridinger, 2000
- Lüder H. Niemeyer: Die fruchtbare Durchdringung. Watteau im Werke Ridinger's, 2000
- Jan Hendrik Niemeyer: Johann Elias Ridinger im Reiche der Kolorierten Thiere. Entstehung und Vollendung einer Folge. New revised edition. 2010
- Ellen Spickernagel: Dem Auge auf die Sprünge helfen. Jagdbare Tiere und Jagden bei Johann Elias Ridinger (1698–1767). In: Annette Bühler-Dietrich u. Michael Weingarten (eds.), Topos Tier: Neue Gestaltungen des Tier-Mensch-Verhältnisses. Bielefeld 2015, ISBN 978-3-8376-2860-9, pp. 103–123.
- U. Heise: Ridinger, Johann Elias. In: Allgemeines Künstler-Lexikon, vol. 98, Berlin, Munich, New York 2017, pp. 472 ff.
- J.E. Ridinger, Entwurff Einiger Thiere (...) 1738–1740. Faksimile edition, Dr. Wolfgang Schwarze Verlag, Wuppertal 1975.
- Johann Elias Ridinger. In: Monika Michel: Vorfahren und Verwandte des Tiermalers und Kupferstechers Johann Elias Ridinger (1698–1767). Blätter des Bayerischen Landesvereins für Familienkunde, 50th volume, issue 15, nos. 13–15. 1987. p. 396 f.
- Jan Hendrik Niemeyer: Ridinger Erlebnisse. Leben Werk Nachruhm in Daten + Annotationen. Norderstedt 2021. ISBN 978-3-7534-3535-0.

== See also ==
- List of German painters
