= Linda Hall Library =

American library of STEM subjects in Kansas City, Missouri

Linda Hall Library of Science, Engineering and Technology
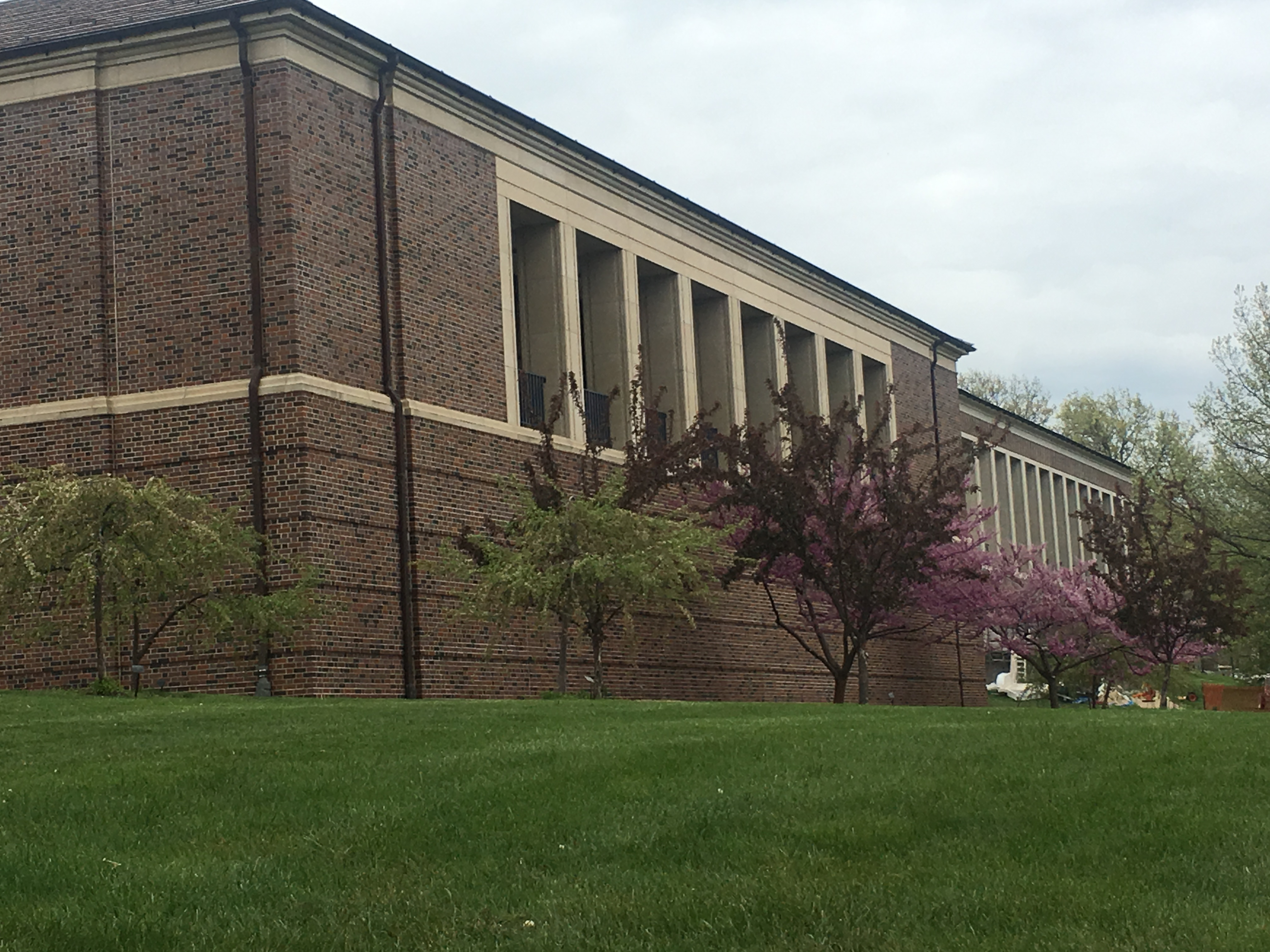
- 39°1′59″N 94°34′44″W
- Location: 5109 Cherry Street; Kansas City, Missouri, US
- Type: Special library
- Established: 1946

Collection
- Items collected: Books, journals, and pamphlets
- Size: 500,000

Other information
- Website: lindahall.org

The Linda Hall Library is a privately endowed American library of STEM subjects located in Kansas City, Missouri, housed in a mid-century building that shares 14-acre (5.7 ha) with ample free parking and an urban arboretum. It claims to be the "largest independently funded public library of science, engineering and technology in North America" and "among the largest science libraries in the world" with half a million items in its collection, as of 2009.

== Description ==
Established in 1946 through the philanthropy of Linda and Herbert F. Hall of the Hall-Bartlett Grain Co., the library is open to the public, and invites individual researchers, academic institutions, and companies from Kansas City and around the world to use the library's research-level collection. Its mission is to act as "guardian of the collective intellectual heritage with regard to the science, technology, and engineering disciplines."

Besides maintaining its collection, the library organizes general interest events aimed at the public, such as historical microscopes from the time of Antoni van Leeuwenhoek to that of Charles Darwin. The library's William N. Deramus III Cosmology Theater, temporarily closed since 2020, shows images of the cosmos from the Hubble Space Telescope and NASA science missions. These images are delivered via ViewSpace to the library with daily updates (via the Internet) that provide the library with new content for visitors.

"The Tazza"—one of the largest pieces of malachite in North America—stands as the focal point in the center of the main reading room, which features parquet wood floors, paneling and bookshelves of oak, and large windows that overlook the south lawn.

== Collections ==
The library's collection numbers over 2 million items. It was initially established by the purchase of the 62,358 books and other items—assembled by John Adams before he became president—that had belonged to the American Academy of Arts and Sciences. It includes academic journals, academic conference proceedings, reference works, publications by the government, and technical reports, industrial standards, engineering society conference papers, U.S. patents, and monographs. In 1995, the Engineering Societies Library (ESL) was transferred to the library, an acquisition equal in significance to the Academy collection, and greater in terms of the number of volumes received. The ESL collection added depth to both the journal and monograph collections, containing publications of many engineering societies, including the American Institute of Aeronautics and Astronautics, the American Society of Civil Engineers, American Institute of Chemical Engineers, the American Society of Mechanical Engineers, the American Institute of Mining, Metallurgical, and Petroleum Engineers, and the Institute of Electrical and Electronics Engineers.

Today, some of the most frequently used items from the library are the Journal of the American Chemical Society and the Tetrahedron Letters (for organic chemistry).

== History of Science Collection ==
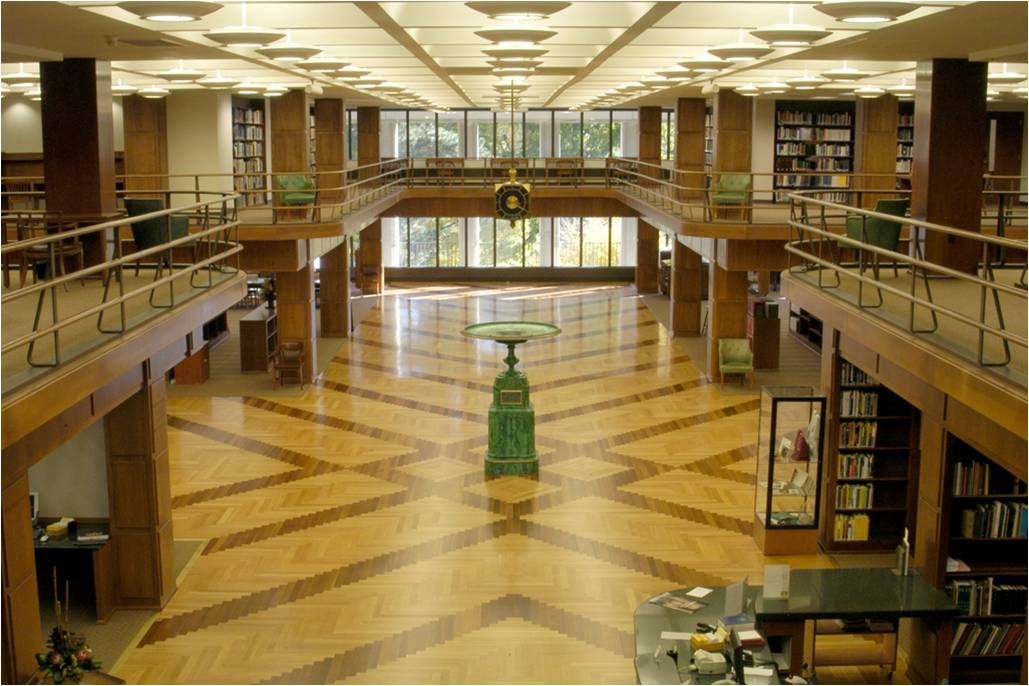
Main reading room of the Linda Hall Library

The library's History of Science Collection contains more than 50,000 volumes, including first editions of many landmarks of science and technology. Some of the oldest books date to the fifteenth century. The oldest book in the collection is a 1472 printing of Pliny the Elder's Naturalis Historia (Natural History).

Online

A number of works can be accessed online, including:

- Georg Joachim Rheticus Narratio Prima (Gdańsk, 1540)
- Tycho Brahe Astronomicall Coniectur (1632)
- George Catlin North American Indian Portfolio (1844)

Historic holdings

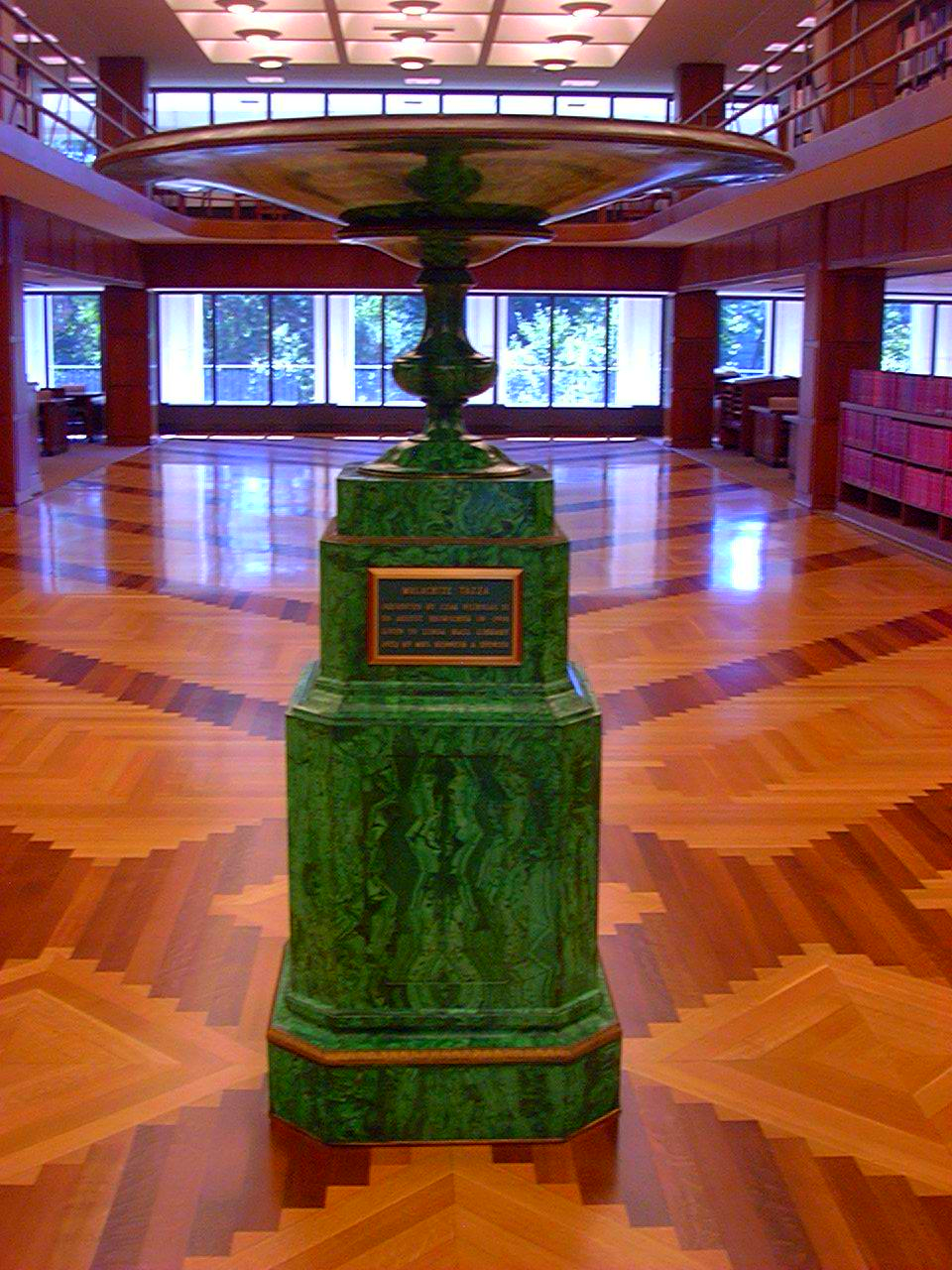
The Tazza, presented in 1972 by Helen Foresman Spencer, and previously a gift from Czar Nicholas II to August Heckscher.

The collection includes other important scientific works (many written in Neo-Latin and other languages), including:

- Nicolaus Copernicus, De revolutionibus orbium coelestium (Nuremberg, 1543)
- Leonhard Fuchs, De historia stirpium commentarii insignes (Basel, 1542)
- Galileo Galilei, Sidereus nuncius (Venice, 1610)
- Francis Bacon, Instauratio magna (including the Novum Organum) (London, 1620)
- Isaac Newton, Philosophiae naturalis principia mathematica (London, 1687)
- Georges Buffon, Histoire Naturelle, générale et particulière, avec la description du Cabinet du Roi (Paris, 1749–1804)
- Charles Darwin, On the Origin of Species (London, 1859)

== Grounds and arboretum ==
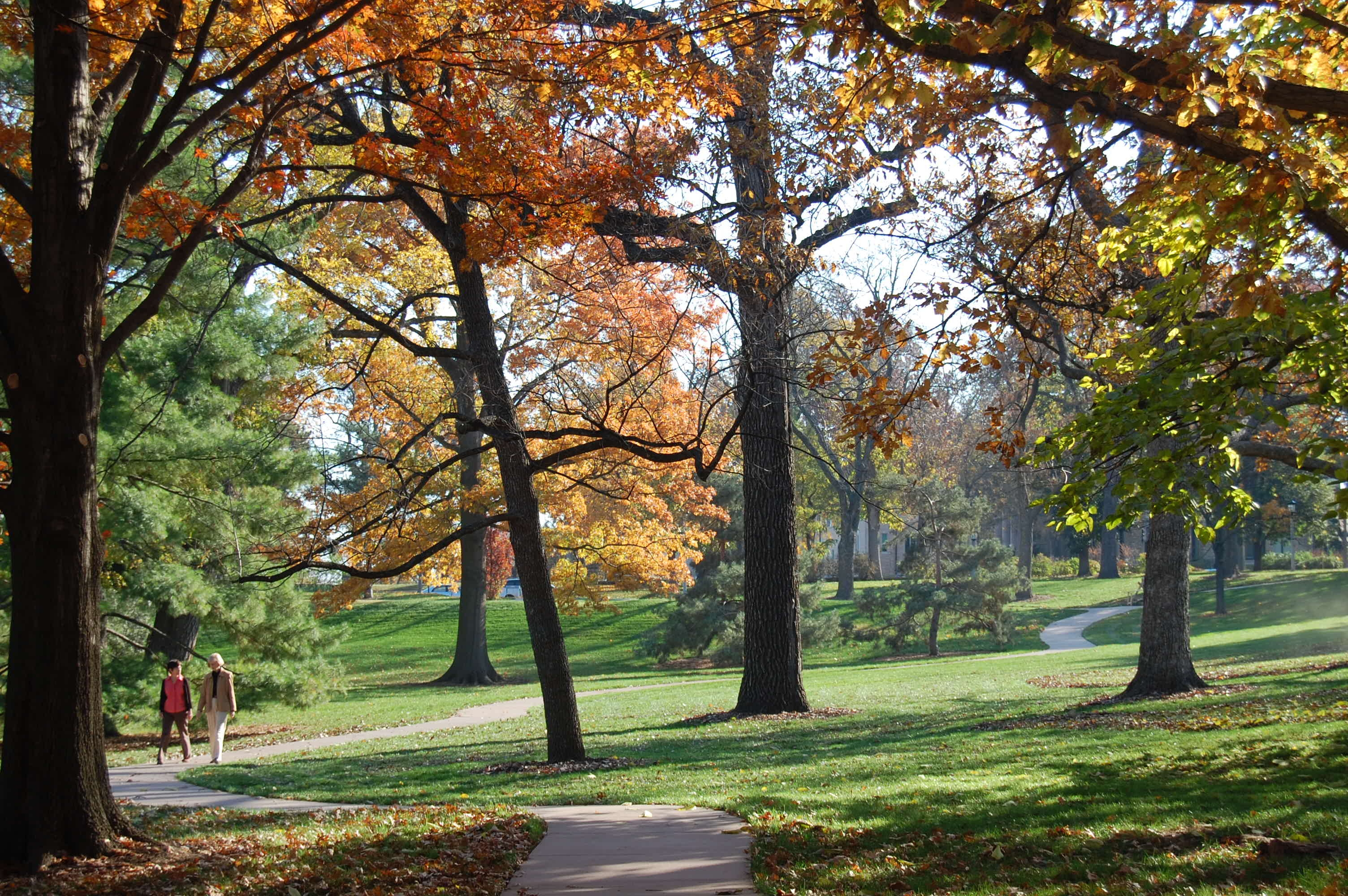
Arboretum of the Linda Hall Library

The 14-acre grounds on which the library sits are home to over 338 trees representing some 52 genera and 145 species. The seven acre arboretum and gardens also contain beds of viburnum, tree peonies, and Missouri native woodland plants. Seven trees on the property have been designated Greater Kansas City Champion Trees and represent the largest specimens of their species in the metropolitan area: Sweet Birch, European Hornbeam, Hardy Rubber Tree, Double Flowered Horsechestnut, Rivers Purple Beech, Yulan Magnolia, and Anise Leaf Magnolia.
