= Malachite =

Mineral variety of copper carbonate

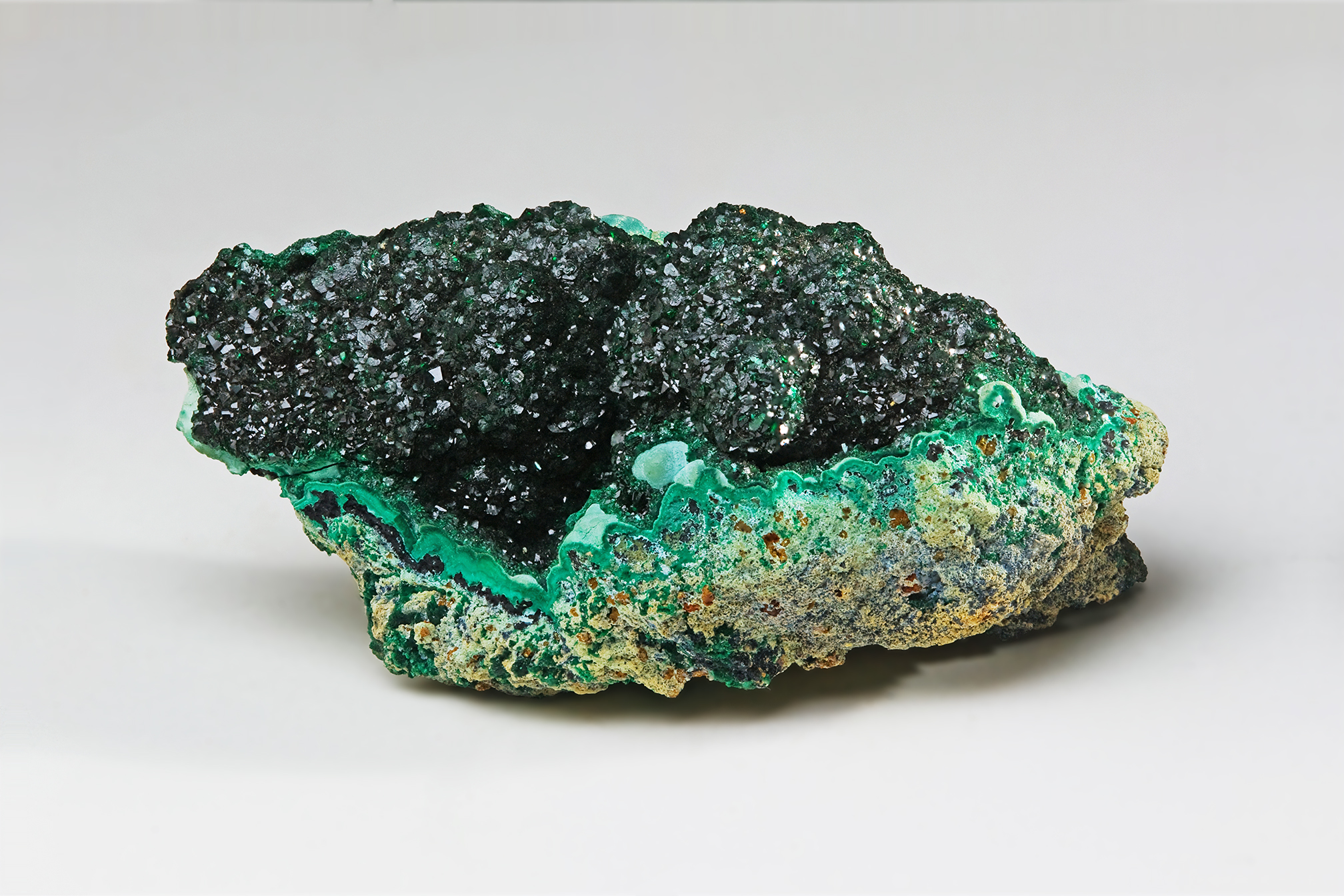
- Malachite from the Democratic Republic of the Congo

General
- Category: Carbonate mineral
- Formula: Cu_{2}CO_{3}(OH)_{2}
- IMA symbol: Mlc
- Strunz classification: 5.BA.10
- Crystal system: Monoclinic
- Crystal class: Prismatic (2/m) (same H-M symbol)
- Space group: P2_{1}/a

Identification
- Formula mass: 221.1 g/mol
- Color: Bright green, dark green, blackish green, with crystals deeper shades of green, even very dark to nearly black commonly banded in masses; green to yellowish green in transmitted light
- Crystal habit: Massive, botryoidal, stalactitic, crystals are acicular to tabular prismatic
- Twinning: Common as contact or penetration twins on {100} and {201}. Polysynthetic twinning also present.
- Cleavage: Perfect on {2̅01} fair on {010}
- Fracture: Subconchoidal to uneven
- Tenacity: Brittle
- Mohs scale hardness: 3.5–4
- Luster: Adamantine to vitreous; silky if fibrous; dull to earthy if massive
- Streak: light green
- Diaphaneity: Translucent to opaque
- Specific gravity: 3.6–4
- Optical properties: Biaxial (–)
- Refractive index: n_{α} = 1.655 n_{β} = 1.875 n_{γ} = 1.909
- Birefringence: δ = 0.254

Malachite (/ˈmæl.əˌkaɪt/) is a copper carbonate hydroxide mineral, with the formula Cu_{2}CO_{3}(OH)_{2}. This opaque, green-banded mineral crystallizes in the monoclinic crystal system, and most often forms botryoidal, fibrous, or stalagmitic masses, in fractures and deep, underground spaces, where the water table and hydrothermal fluids provide the means for chemical precipitation. Individual crystals are rare, but occur as slender to acicular prisms. Pseudomorphs after more tabular or blocky azurite crystals also occur.

== Etymology and history ==
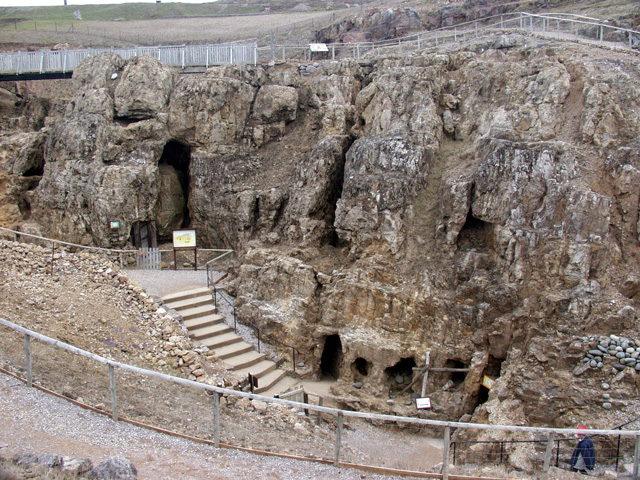
The entrance to the Neolithic era malachite mine complex on the Great Orme, Wales

The stone's name derives (via Latin: molochītis, Middle French: melochite, and Middle English melochites) from Greek Μολοχίτης λίθος molochites lithos, "mallow-green stone", from μολόχη molochē, variant of μαλάχη malāchē, "mallow". The mineral was given this name due to its resemblance to the leaves of the mallow plant. Copper (Cu^{2+}) gives malachite its green color.

Malachite was mined from deposits near the Isthmus of Suez and the Sinai as early as 4000 BC.

It was extensively mined at the Great Orme Mines in Britain 3,800 years ago, using stone and bone tools. Archaeological evidence indicates that mining activity ended c. 600 BC, with up to 1,760 tonnes of copper being produced from the mined malachite.

Archaeological evidence indicates that the mineral has been mined and smelted to obtain copper at Timna Valley in contemporary Israel for more than 3,000 years. Since then, malachite has been used as both an ornamental stone and as a gemstone.

The use of azurite and malachite as copper ore indicators led indirectly to the name of the element nickel in the English language. Nickeline, a principal ore of nickel that is also known as niccolite, weathers at the surface into a green mineral (annabergite) that resembles malachite. This resemblance resulted in occasional attempts to smelt nickeline in the belief that it was copper ore, but such attempts always ended in failure due to high smelting temperatures needed to reduce nickel. In Germany, this deceptive mineral came to be known as Kupfernickel, literally "copper demon". Swedish alchemist Baron Axel Fredrik Cronstedt (who had been trained by Georg Brandt, the discoverer of the nickel-like metal cobalt) realized that a new metal probably was hiding within the Kupfernickel ore, and in 1751, he succeeded in smelting Kupfernickel to produce a previously unknown (except in certain meteorites) silvery-white, iron-like metal. Logically, Cronstedt named his new metal after the nickel part of Kupfernickel.

== Occurrence ==
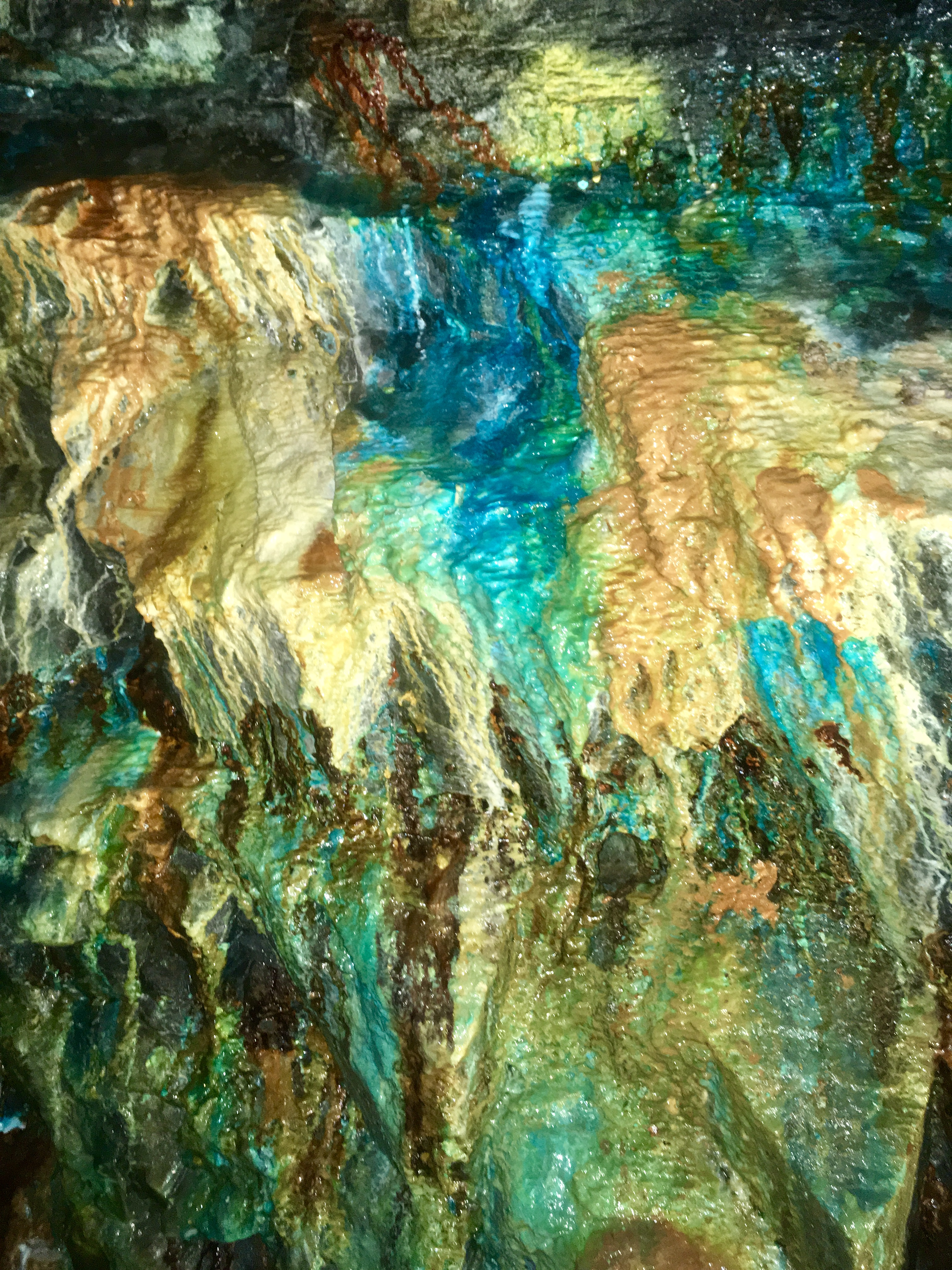
Malachite in the walls of Outokumpu's old mine

Malachite often results from the supergene weathering and oxidation of primary sulfidic copper ores and is often found with azurite (Cu_{3}(CO_{3})_{2}(OH)_{2}), goethite, and calcite. Except for its vibrant green color, the properties of malachite are similar to those of azurite and aggregates of the two minerals occur frequently. Malachite is more common than azurite and is typically associated with copper deposits around limestones, the source of the carbonate.

Large quantities of malachite have been mined in the Urals, Russia. Ural malachite is not being mined as of 2006, but G.N Vertushkova reports the possible discovery of new deposits of malachite in the Urals. It is found worldwide, including in the Democratic Republic of the Congo; Gabon; Zambia; Tsumeb, Namibia; Mexico; Broken Hill, New South Wales; Burra, South Australia; Lyon, France; Timna Valley, Israel; and the Southwestern United States, most notably in Arizona.

Anthropogenic malachite historically was believed to be the primary component of the patina that forms on copper and copper alloy structures exposed to open-air weathering, but atmospheric sources of sulfate and chloride (such as air pollution or sea winds) typically favour the formation of brochantite or atacamite. Malachite can also be produced synthetically, in which case it is referred to as basic copper carbonate or green verditer.

== Structure ==
Malachite crystallizes in the monoclinic system. The structure consists of chains of alternating Cu^{2+} and OH^{−} ions, with a net positive charge, woven between isolated triangular CO_{3}^{2−} ions. Thus, each copper ion is conjugated to two hydroxyl ions and two carbonate ions; each hydroxyl ion is conjugated with two copper ions; and each carbonate ion is conjugated with six copper ions.

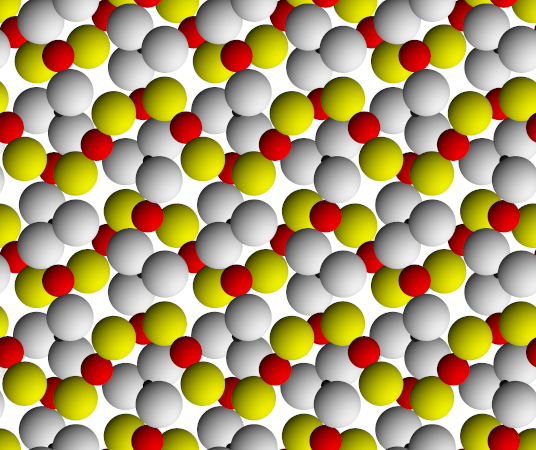
View along c axis of the crystal structure of malachite

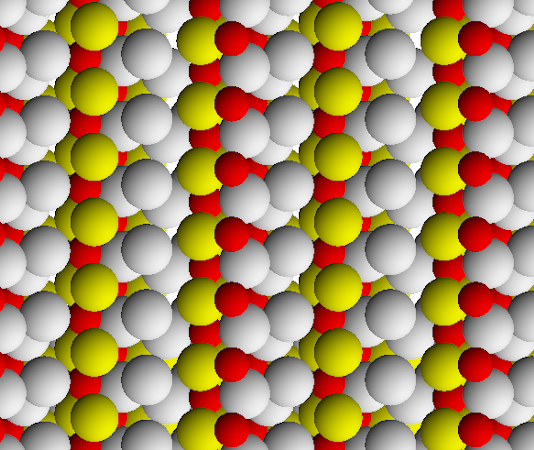
View along a axis of malachite crystal structure

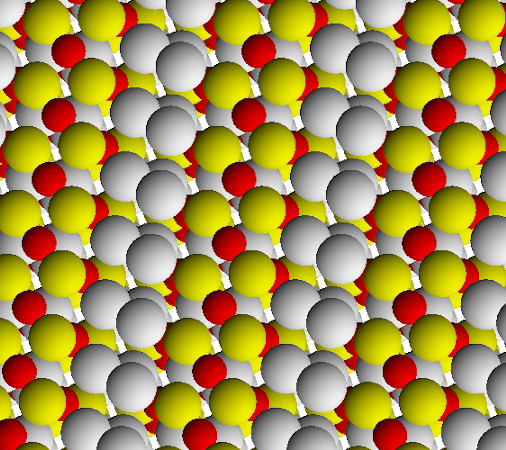
View along b axis of malachite crystal structure

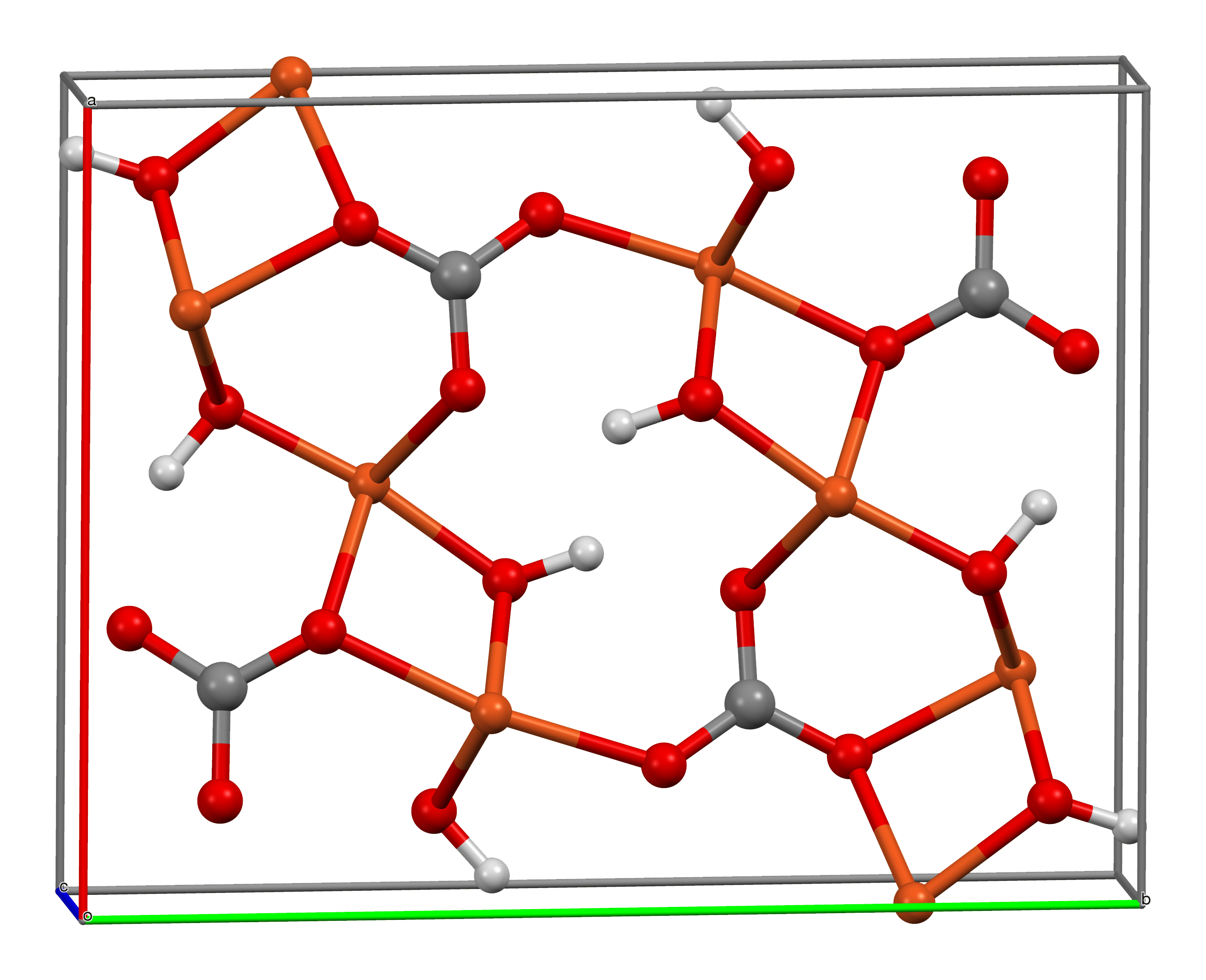
Unit cell of malachite

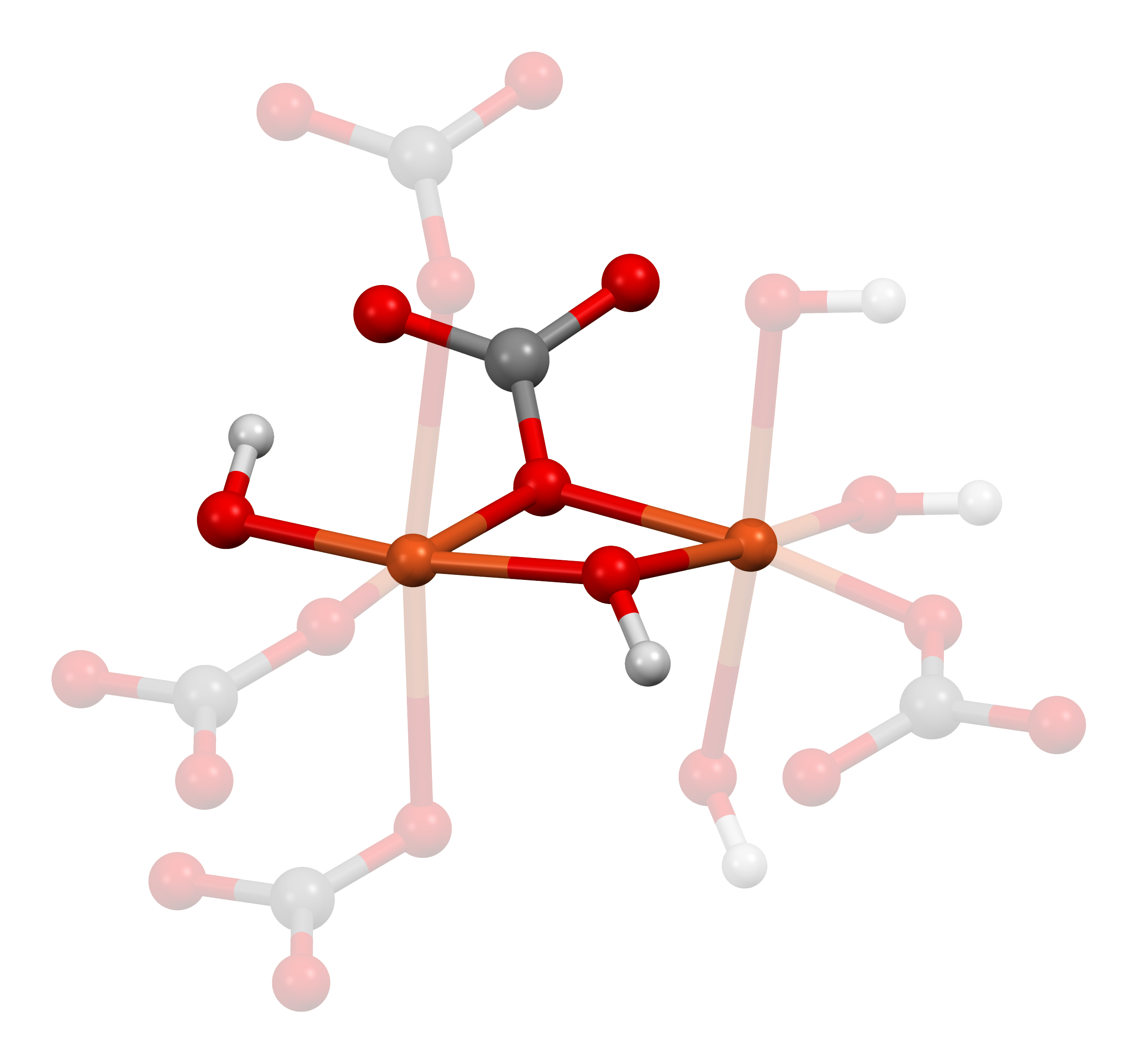
Formula unit and its coordination environment

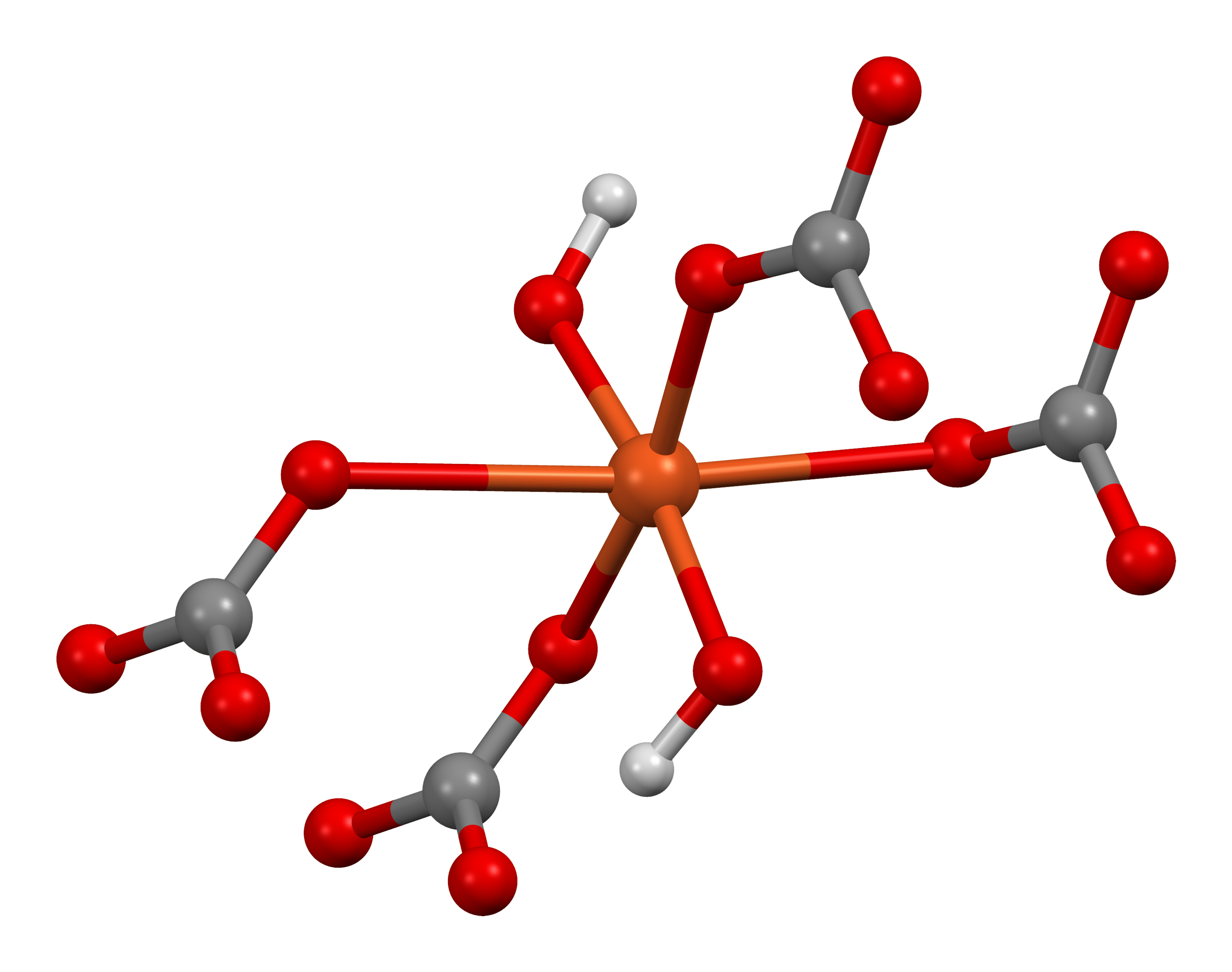
Coordination environment of copper #1

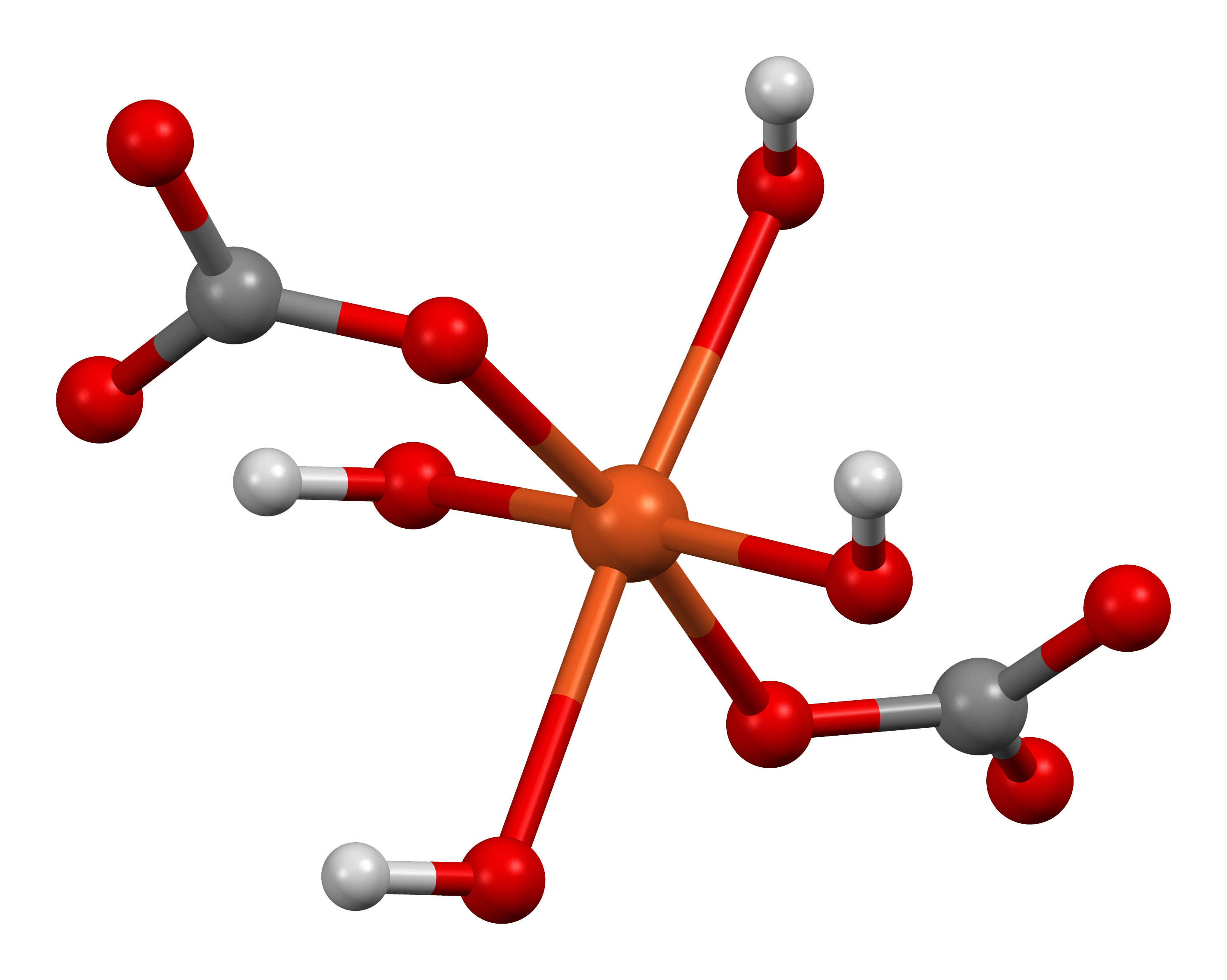
Coordination environment of copper #2

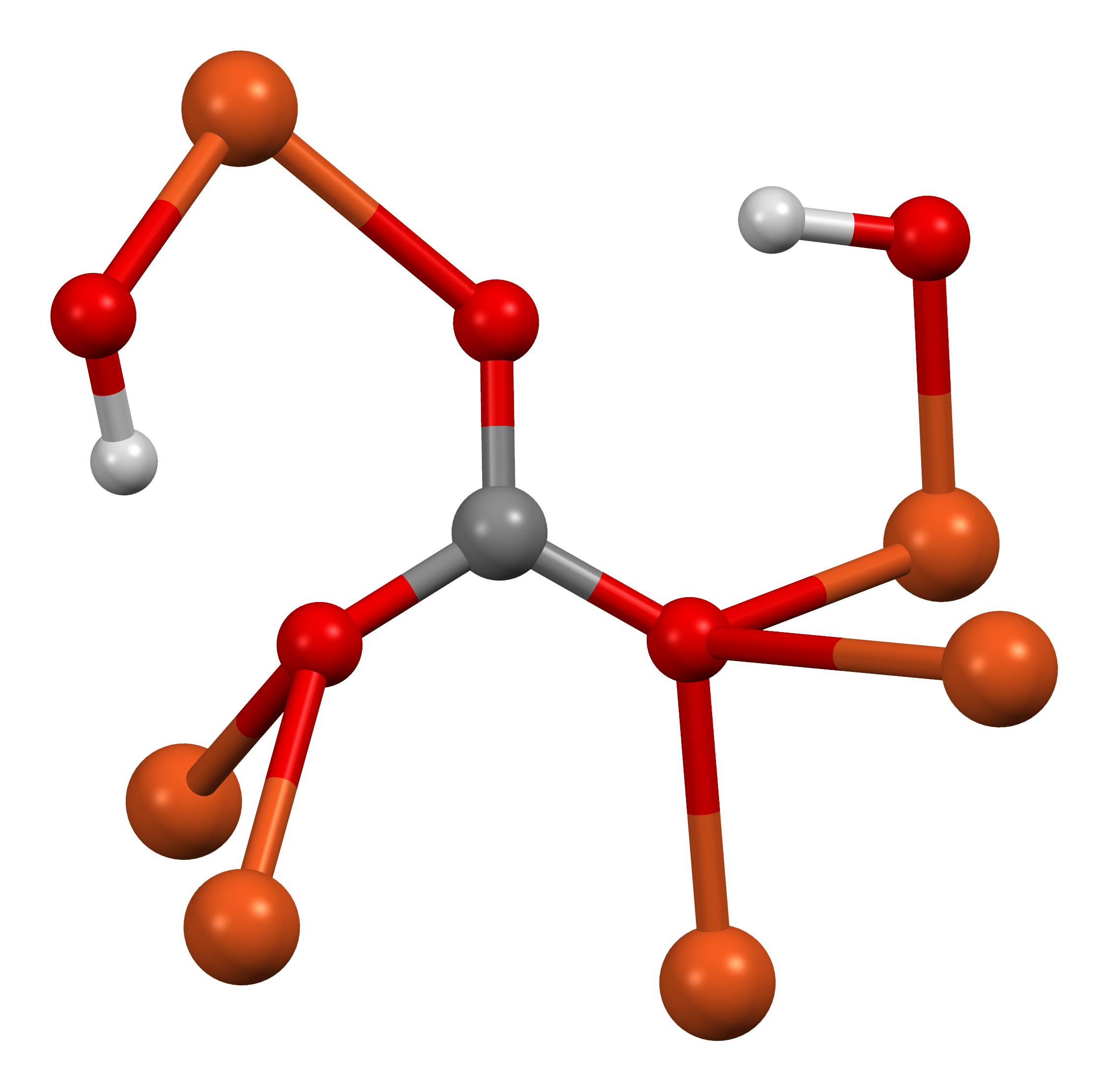
Coordination environment of carbonate

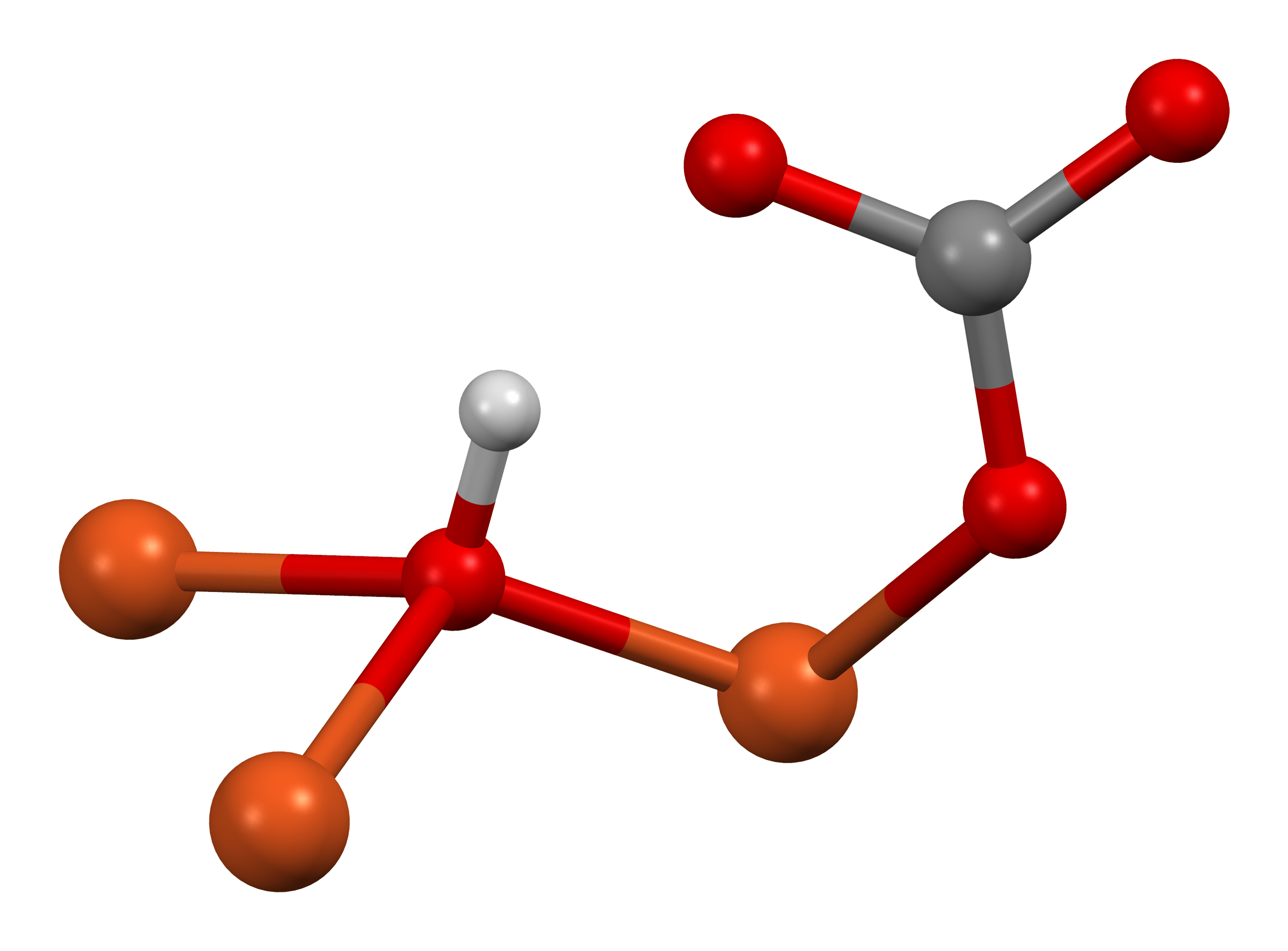
Coordination environment of hydroxide #1

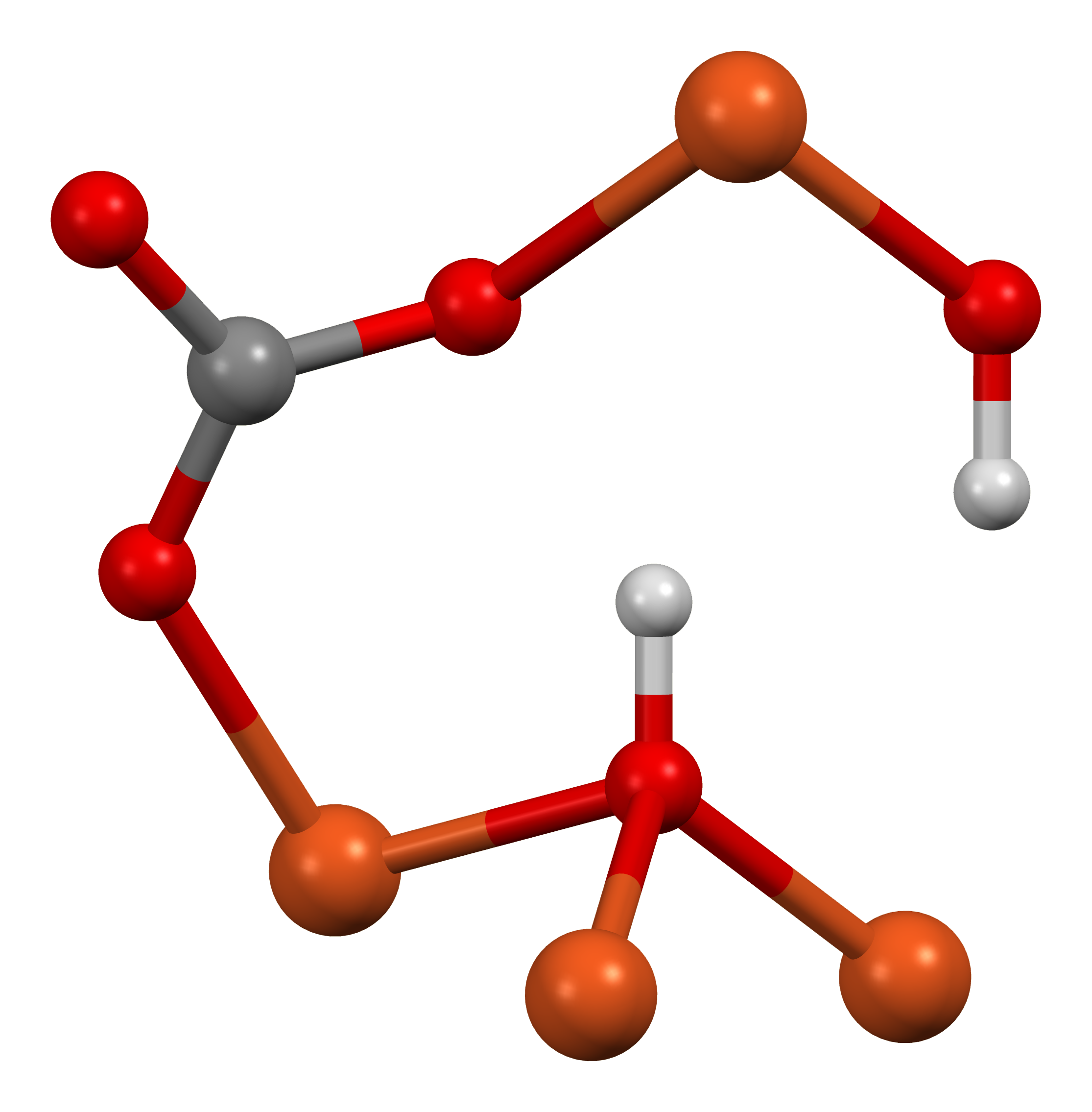
Coordination environment of hydroxide #2

== Use ==
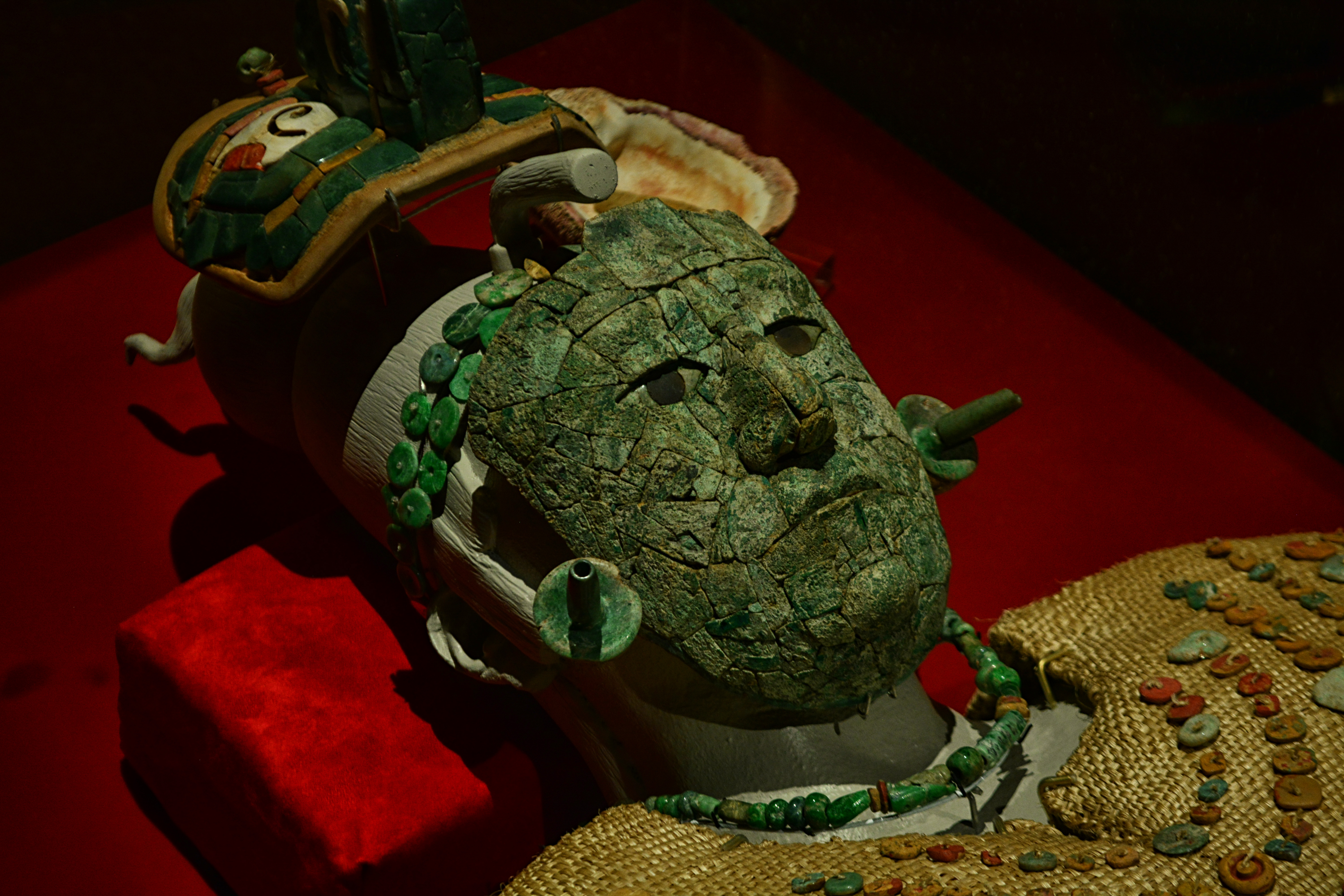
The funerary mask of the Red Queen of Palenque is made from a mosaic of malachite.

Malachite was used as a mineral pigment or dye in green paints from antiquity until c. 1800. The pigment is moderately lightfast, sensitive to acids, and varying in color. This natural form of green pigment has been replaced by its synthetic form, verditer, among other synthetic greens.

Malachite is also used for decorative purposes, such as in the Malachite Room in the Hermitage Museum, which features a huge malachite vase, and the Malachite Room in Castillo de Chapultepec in Mexico City. Russian tsars obtained malachite for decorating their castles, paneling the walls, and for beautiful inlaid works. Another example is the Demidov Vase, part of the former Demidov family collection and now in the Metropolitan Museum of Art. "The Tazza", a large malachite vase, one of the largest pieces of malachite in North America and a gift from Tsar Nicholas II, stands as the focal point in the centre of the room of Linda Hall Library. In the time of Tsar Nicolas I decorative pieces with malachite were among the most popular diplomatic gifts. It was used in China as far back as the Eastern Zhou period. The base of FIFA World Cup Trophy has two layers of malachite. There is a malachite chimneypiece surround in Cliffe Castle, Keighley, using malachite mined in the Urals. It was also comissioned by the Demidov family and originally shown at the Great Exhibition of 1851 in London

=== Symbolism and superstitions ===
A 17th-century Spanish superstition held that having children wear a lozenge of malachite would help them sleep and keep evil spirits at bay. Marbodus recommended malachite as a talisman for young people because of its protective qualities and its ability to help with sleep. It has also historically been worn for protection from lightning and contagious diseases and for health, success, and constancy in the affections. During the Middle Ages, wearing it engraved with a figure or symbol of the Sun was customary to maintain health and to avert depression to which Capricorns were considered vulnerable.

In ancient Egypt, the colour green (wadj) was associated with death and the power of resurrection, as well as new life and fertility. Ancient Egyptians believed that the afterlife contained an eternal paradise, referred to as the "Field of Malachite", which resembled their lives, but with no pain or suffering. During these times, the green pigment made from malachite was often used for eye preparations during the burial process. These preparations were an essential tool in the funerary equipment, even in modest burials.

=== Ore uses ===
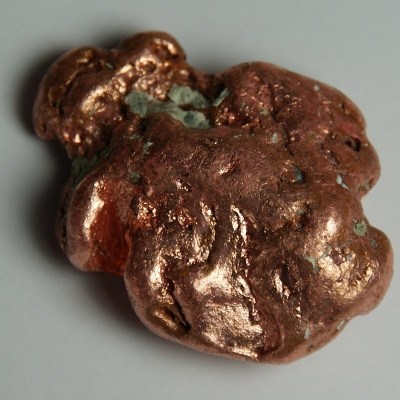
Copper nugget example

Simple methods of copper ore extraction from malachite involved thermodynamic processes such as smelting. This reaction involves the addition of heat and a carbon, causing the carbonate to decompose, leaving copper oxide and an additional carbon source such as coal converts the copper oxide into copper metal.

The basic word equation for this reaction is:

Copper carbonate + heat → carbon dioxide + copper oxide (color changes from green to black).

Copper oxide + carbon → carbon dioxide + copper (color change from black to copper colored).

Malachite is a low-grade copper ore, but due to increased demand for metals, more economic processing such as hydrometallurgical methods (using aqueous solutions such as sulfuric acid) are being used, as malachite is readily soluble in dilute acids. Sulfuric acid is the most common leaching agent for copper oxide ores like malachite and eliminates the need for smelting processes.

The chemical equation for sulfuric acid leaching of copper ore from malachite is:

+ → + +	Reaction 1

== Health and environmental concerns ==
Mining for malachite for ornamental or copper ore purposes involves open-pit mining or underground mining depending on the grade of the ore deposits. These mining practices can cause environmental degradation through habitat and biodiversity loss. Acid mine drainage can contaminate water and food sources to impact human health negatively if improperly managed or if leaks from tailing ponds occur. The risk of health and environmental impacts of both traditional metallurgy and newer methods of hydrometallurgy are both significant, but water conservation and waste-management practices for hydrometallurgy processes for ore extraction, such as for malachite, are stricter and relatively more sustainable. New research is also being conducted on better alternatives to methods such as sulfuric acid leaching, which has high environmental impacts, even under hydrometallurgy regulation standards and innovation.

== Gallery ==
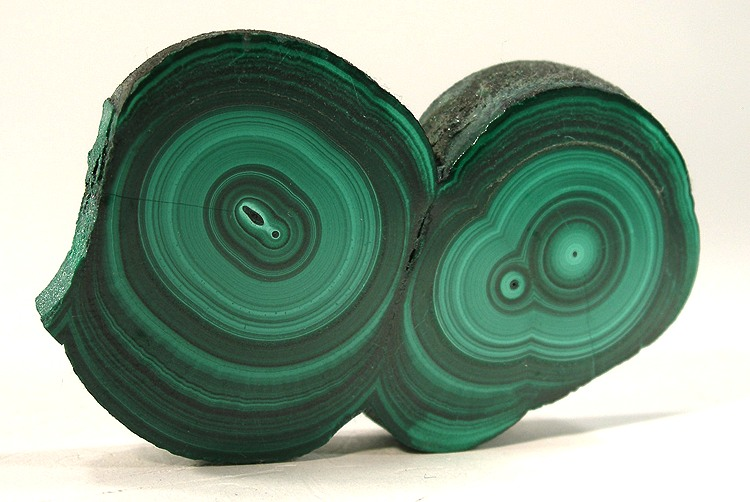
Slice through a double stalactite, from Kolwezi, Democratic Republic of the Congo. Size 5.9 × 3.9 × 0.7 cm

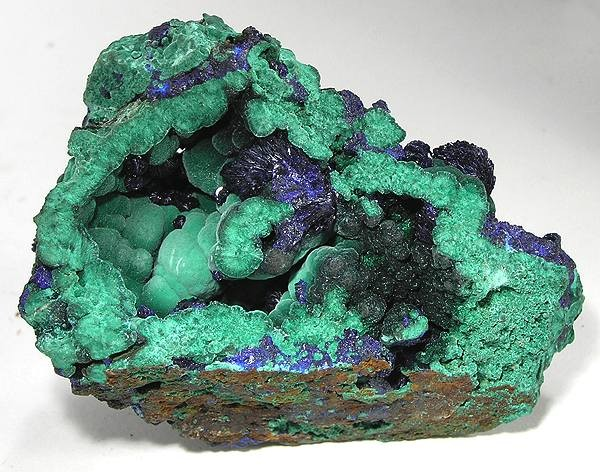
Malachite and azurite from Bisbee, Warren District, Mule Mts, Cochise County, Arizona

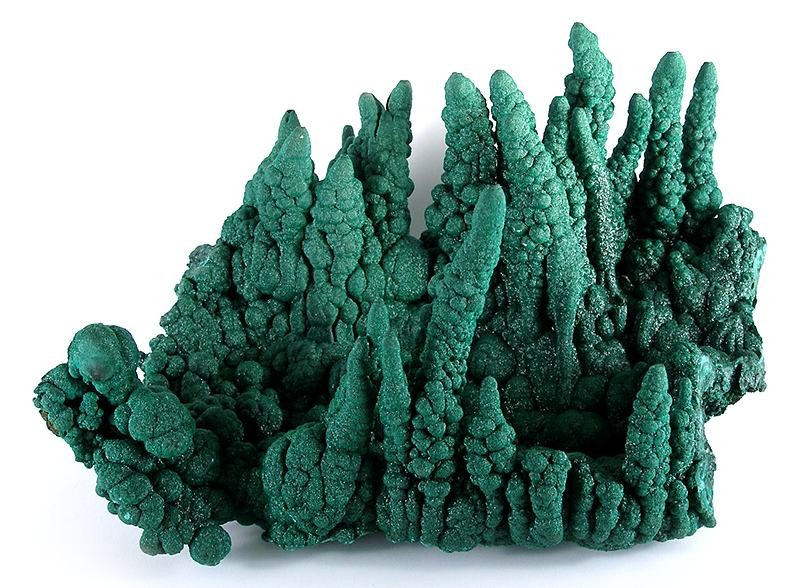
Malachite stalactites (to 9 cm height), from Kasompi Mine, Katanga Province, Democratic Republic of the Congo, size: 21.6×16.0×11.9 cm

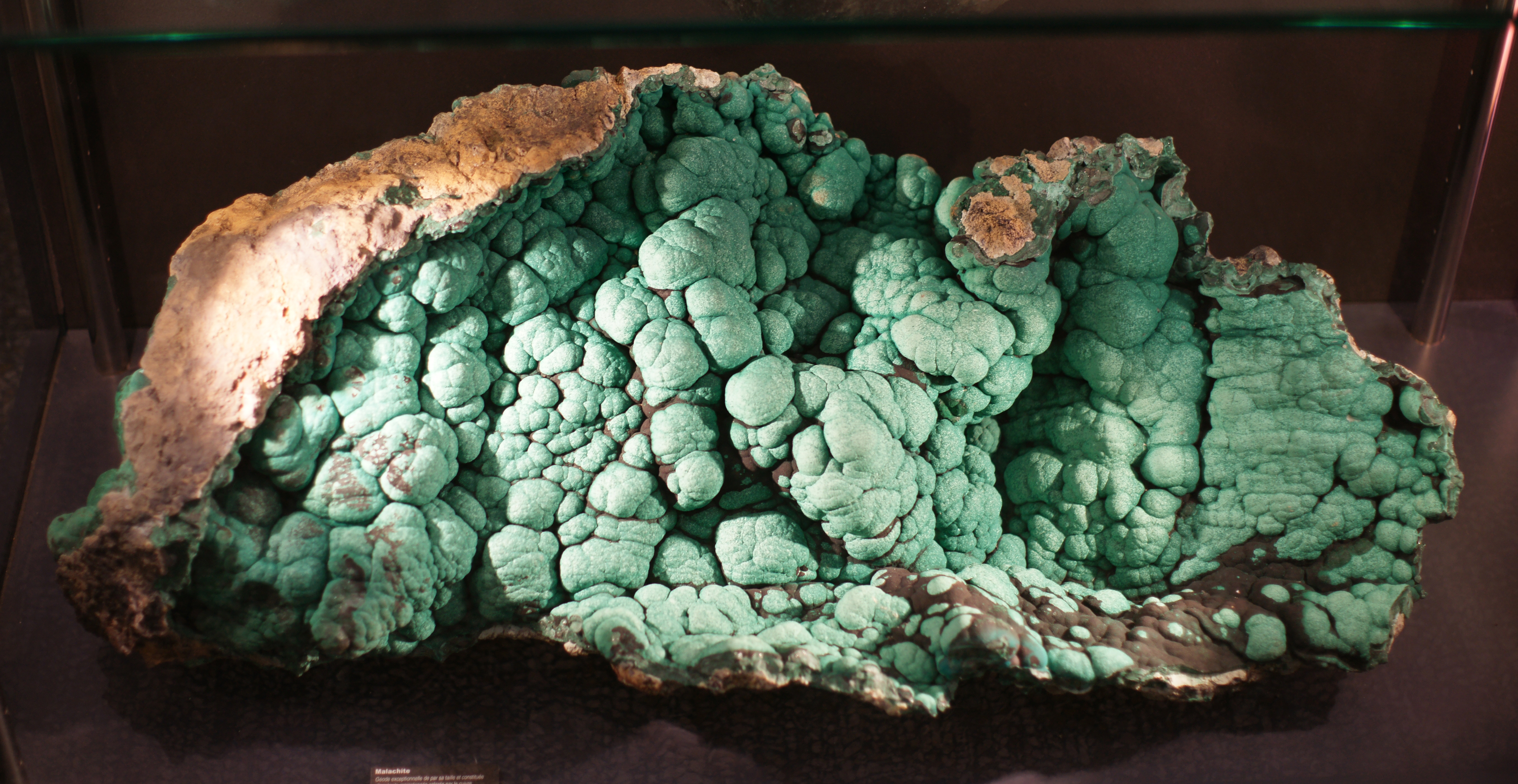
Sample of malachite found at Kaluku Luku Mine, Lubumbashi, Shaba, Congo

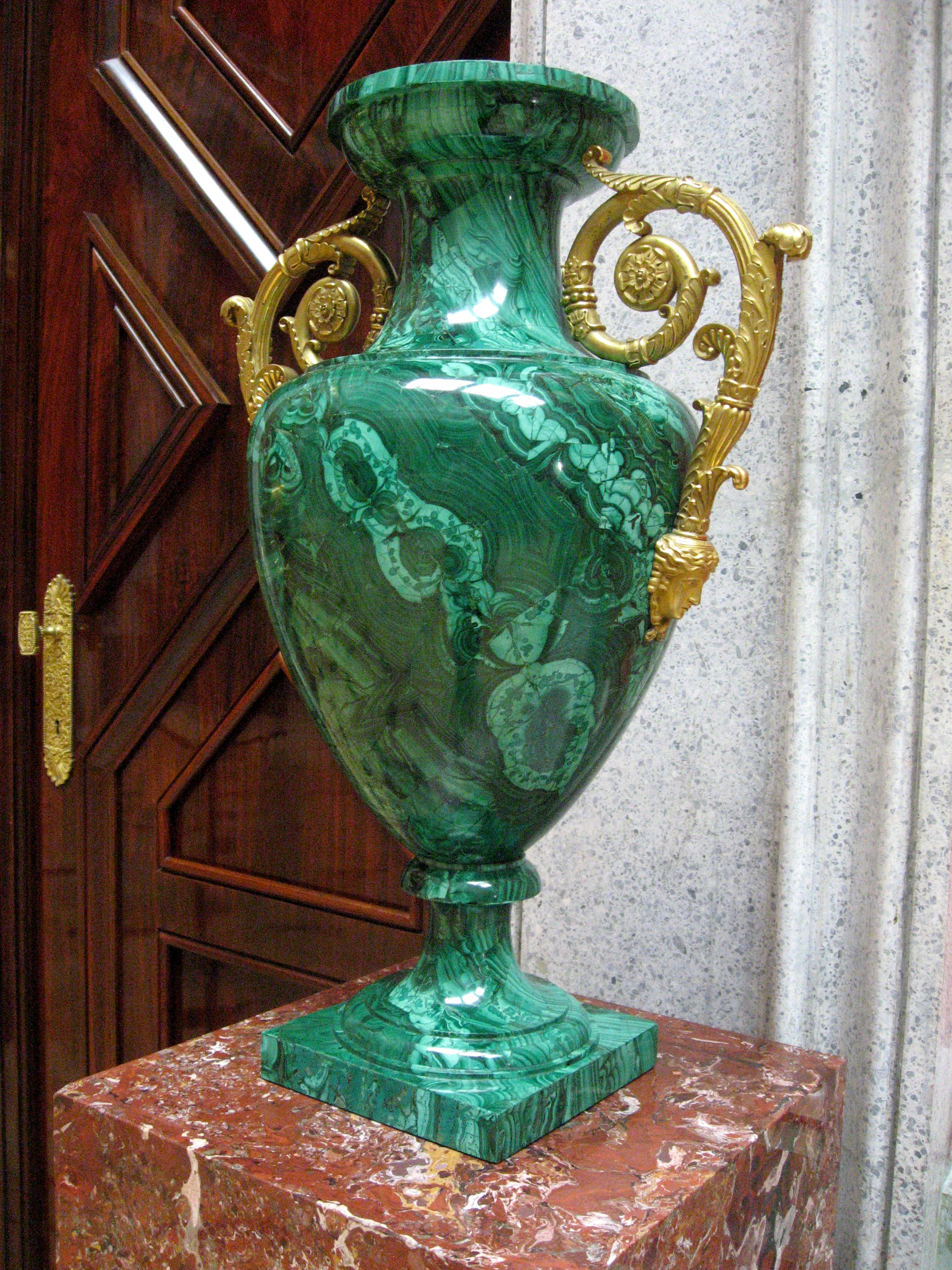
Vase in malachite in the Hermitage Museum, St. Petersburg

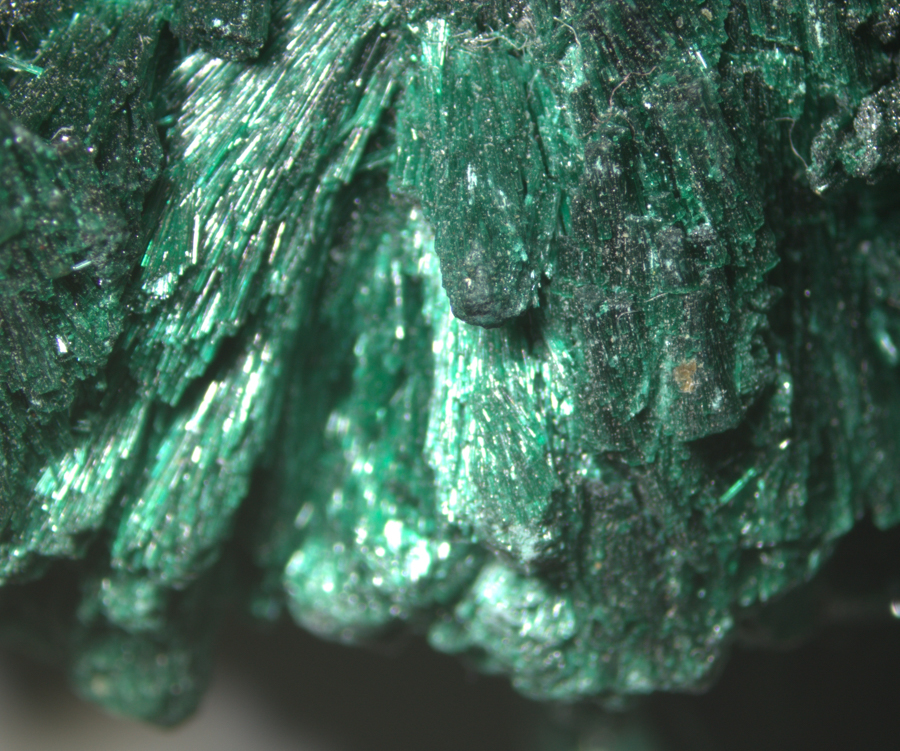
Malachite, image taken under a stereoscopic microscope

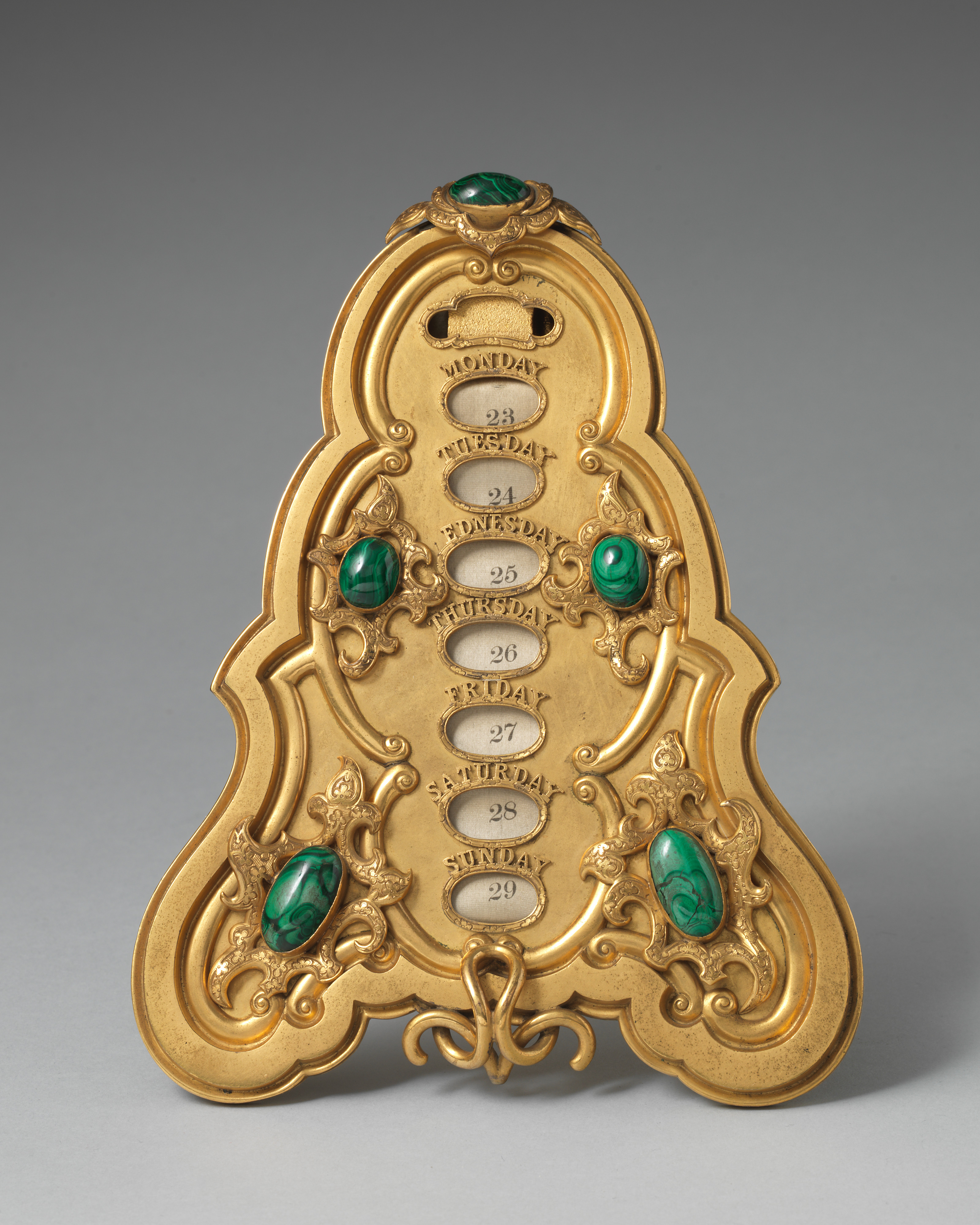
British calendar, 1851, gilt bronze and malachite, height: 20.3 cm, Metropolitan Museum of Art (New York City)

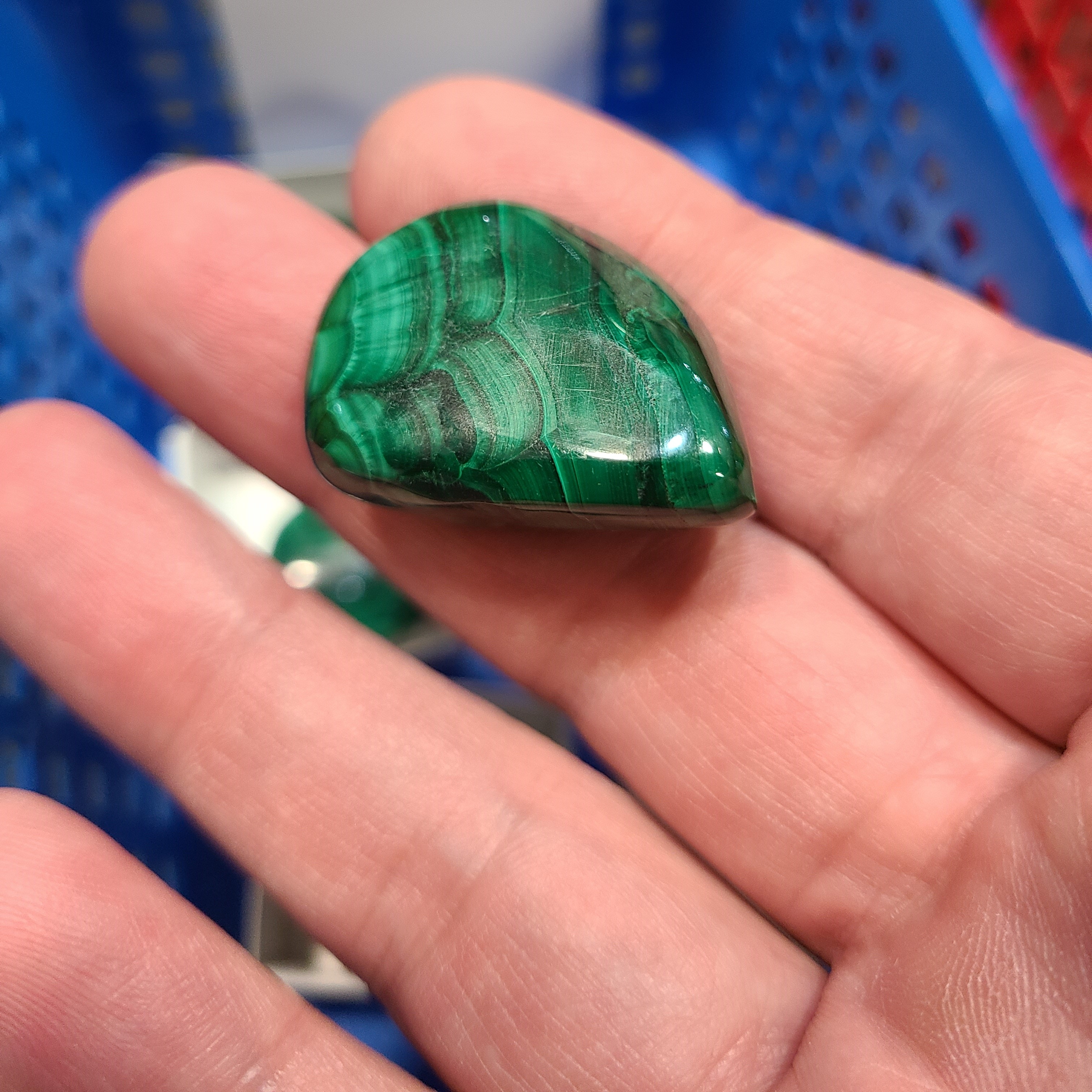
Malachite at Kaleideum Children's Museum

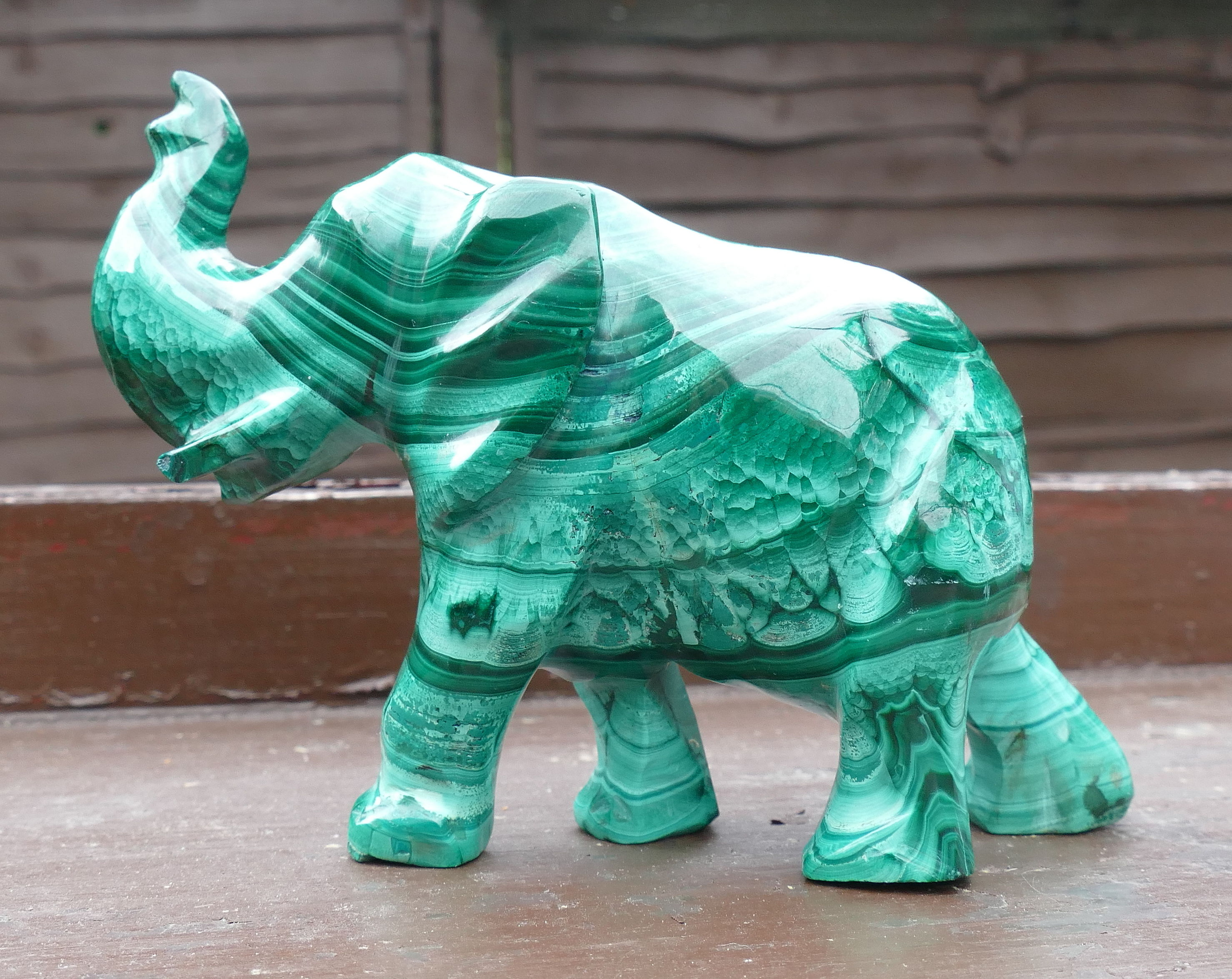
Elephant carved from malachite, length 11 cm

== See also ==
- Aventurine
- Brochantite
- Chrysocolla
- Dioptase
- Green pigments
- List of inorganic pigments
- Plancheite
- Pseudomalachite
- Turquoise
- Verdigris
