= Cambridge Digital Library =

The Cambridge Digital Library is a project operated by the Cambridge University Library designed to make items from the unique and distinctive collections of Cambridge University Library available online. The project was initially funded by a donation of £1.5 million GBP from Dr. Leonard Polonsky, with the purpose of developing the technical infrastructure and producing an initial batch of online content. The first step of the project, known as the Foundations Project, ran from mid-2010 to early 2014, and was themed around two main strands, Faith and Science.

== Faith Collection ==
The "Faith Collection" will have works from many different religious beliefs, including Judaism, Islam, Christianity and Buddhism. The Library's collections include some of the earliest Qur'an fragments on parchment, a section of devotional works and mystic treatises, a unique copy of the Kitāb al-Tawhīd by al-Māturīdī, and the first known Qur'an commentary written in Persian. The Library also owns over 1000 manuscripts in Hebrew. They cover a wide range of texts, such as Bibles, commentaries, liturgy, philosophy, kabbalah, literature, and legal documents. There are scrolls and fragments of this information, however, the majority of these manuscripts are in codex form. The oldest piece which the library possesses in this particular collection is a copy of the 10 commandments written on papyrus. The Library's Christian pieces include the Codex Bezae Cantabrigiensis, an important New Testament manuscript, the Moore Bede, and the Book of Cerne. The Library also houses some of the earliest surviving Buddhist manuscripts. It plans to incorporate all of these into the digital library.

== Science Collection ==
The pieces that the Library plans to use in the scientific portion of its digital library focuses on original scientific manuscripts. The Library holds a large collection in the history of science. These begin with the works of Sir Isaac Newton. The Library also has many papers from other famous scientists, including Charles Darwin, Lord Kelvin, Adam Sedgwick, J.J. Thomson, Ernest Rutherford, James Clerk Maxwell, and Sir George Gabriel Stokes.
