= Tazza (cup) =

Saucer-like drinking dish

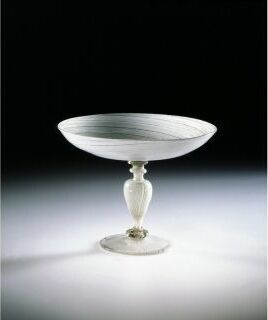
Venetian glass tazza, c. 1550–1600 V&A Museum, London, no. 1860-1855

A tazza (/ˈtɑːtsə/, Italian: tazza, lit. 'cup' pronounced [ˈtattsa]; pl. tazze Italian: [ˈtattse]) is a wide but shallow saucer-like dish either mounted on a stem and foot or on a foot alone. The word has been generally adopted by archaeologists and connoisseurs for this type of vessel, used either for drinking, serving small items of food, or just for display. Tazze are most commonly made in metal, glass, or ceramics, but may be made of other materials.

The Farnese Tazza is a 2nd-century BC cameo cup of Hellenistic Egypt in four-layered sardonyx agate. It is in the Naples National Archaeological Museum (Inv. MANN 27611), and is 20 cm (8 in) wide.

The shape and the name are sometimes adopted for reference to very large sculptured objects, especially ones used for fountains. The colossal tazza in the Linda Hall Library, Kansas City, Missouri, is one of the largest pieces of malachite in North America. It was presented by Czar Nicholas II to August Heckscher in 1910 and given to the Linda Hall Library in 1972 by Mrs. Helen Spencer. It is the focal point at the center of the main reading room of the library.

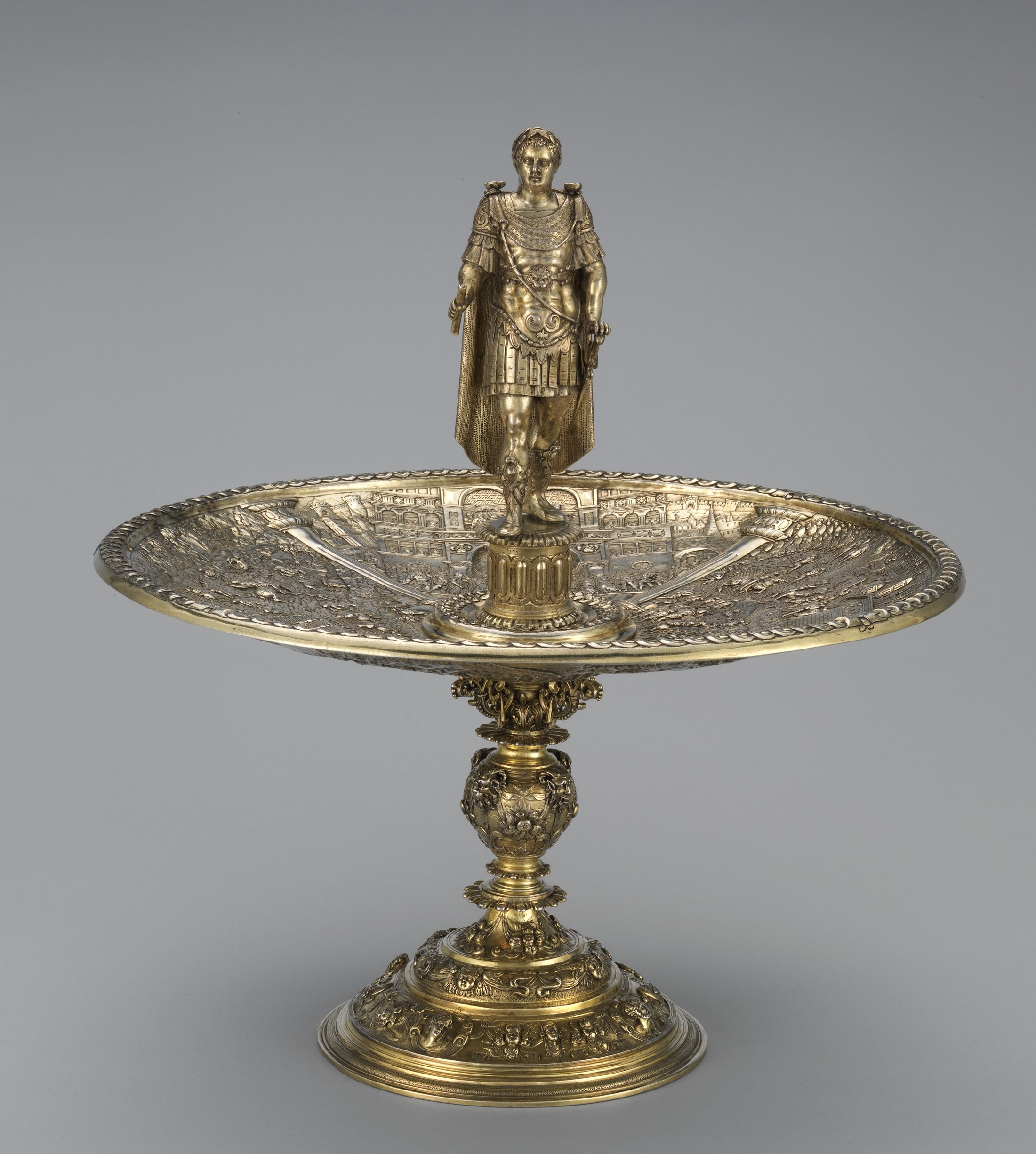
Aldobrandini Tazza of the Roman emperor Vitellius, Metropolitan Museum of Art, New York, c. 1590s
