= De historia stirpium commentarii insignes =

Herbal book by Leonhart Fuchs

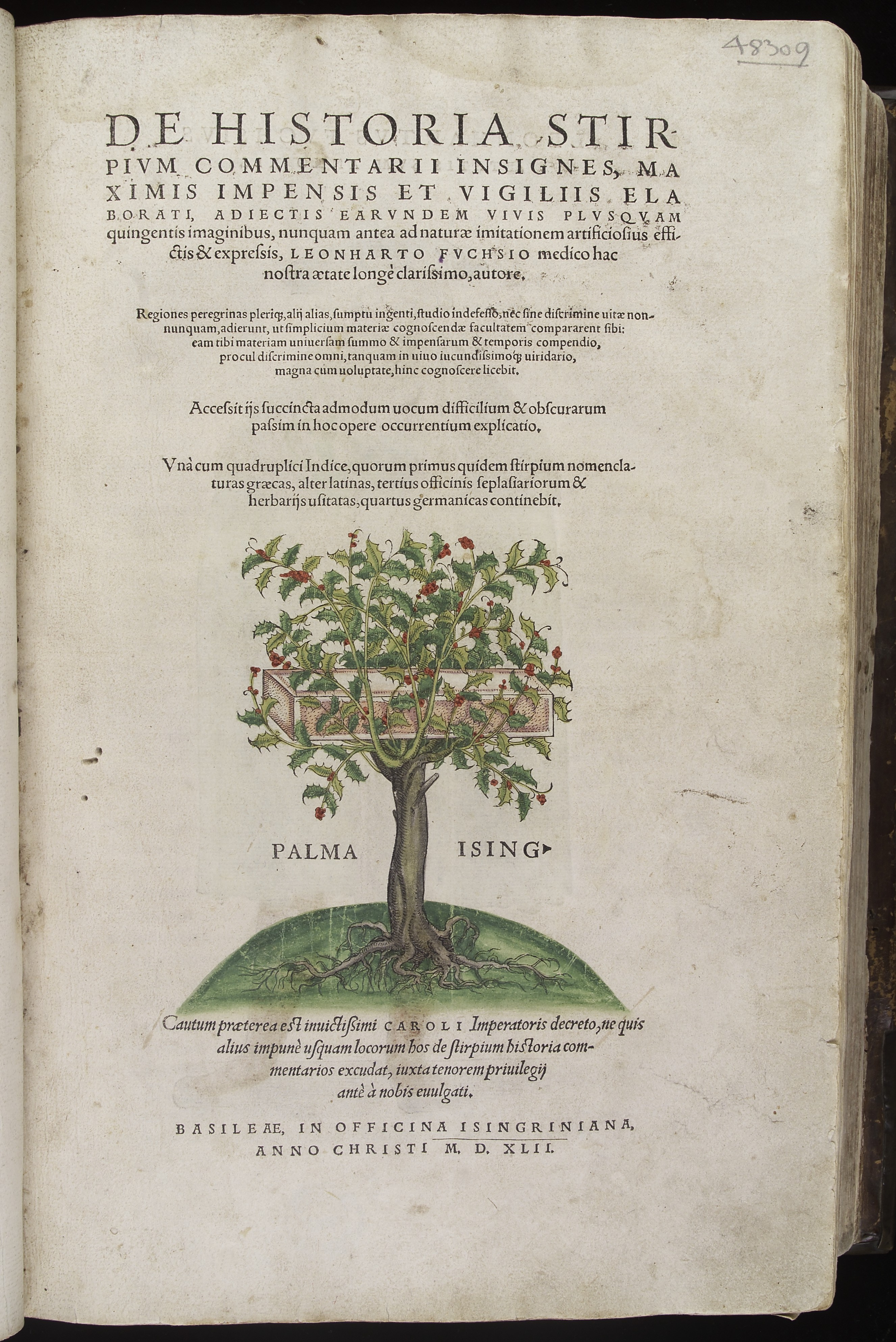
- Title page of a hand-coloured copy of the first edition (Wellcome Collection)
- Author: Leonhart Fuchs
- Language: Latin
- Genre: folio, herbal
- Publisher: Isingrin, Basel
- Publication date: 1542
- Publication place: Switzerland
- Pages: 896

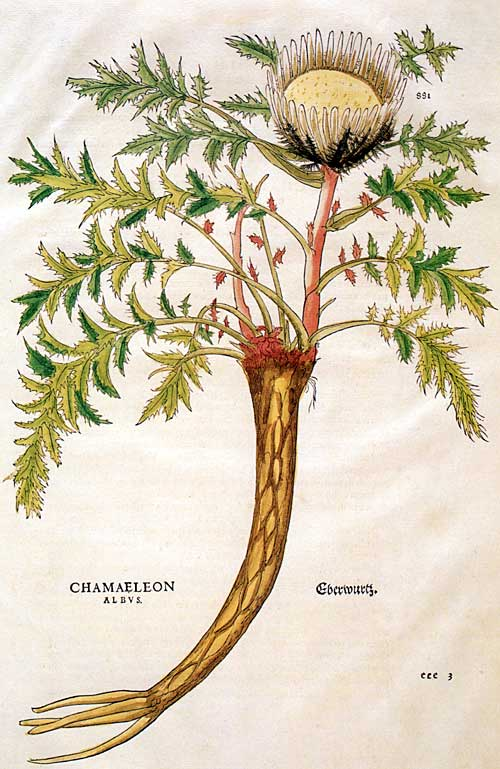
Fuchs called this thistle Chamaeleon albus, it is now known as Carlina acaulis.

De historia stirpium commentarii insignes (Latin for Notable Commentaries on the History of Plants) is a book by Leonhart Fuchs on herbal plants published in Basel in 1542. The work covers about 497 plants and has over 500 woodcut illustrations. Over 100 of the plants in the book were first descriptions.

De historia stirpium was illustrated by Albrecht Meyer (who made drawings based on the actual plants), Heinrich Füllmaurer (who transferred the drawings to woodblock), and Vitus Rudolph Speckle (who cut the blocks and printed the drawings).

== History ==
Fuchs tried to identify the plants described by the classical authors. Over a decade, he began to prepare for the publication of his herbal. He stocked the garden attached to his house with rare specimens solicited from friends around Europe, and he assembled a large botanical library.

De historia was initially published in Latin and quickly translated, with varying degrees of fidelity to his text, into German as New Kreüterbuch in 1543, "The New Herbal" in English and Den nieuwen Herbarius, dat is dat boeck van den cruyden (1543) in Dutch. During Fuchs' lifetime the book went through 39 printings in Dutch, French, German, Latin, and Spanish and 20 years after his death was again translated into English.

== Structure ==
De Historia Stirpium Commentarii Insignes (Notable commentaries on the history of plants) contains the description of about 400 wild and more than 100 domesticated plant species and their medical uses (Krafft und Würckung) in alphabetical order. Fuchs made no attempt at presenting them in a natural system of classification. The first reports of Zea mays and of chili peppers were among the exotic new species. The text is mainly based on Dioscorides. Plants were identified in German, Greek, and Latin, and sometimes English.

The book contains 512 pictures of plants, largely growing locally, in woodcuts. The illustrators were Heinrich Füllmaurer and Albrecht Meyer, and the woodcutter Veit Rudolph Speckle, portraits of whom are contained in the volume. It was printed at the shop of Michael Isengrin in Basel in 1542.

== Reception ==
On publication, Fuchs' herbal set new standards in terms of scholarship and illustration, but was too erudite and too expensive to replace existing herbals.

== Legacy ==
Its appeal to gardeners, botanists, bibliophiles, and the casual viewer was immediate, while the clarity of its plant pictures continues to define a standard for botanical illustrators.

The University of Glasgow states that it is considered a landmark work in its field. Stanford University Press considers it one of the best illustrated books of all time and a masterpiece of the German Renaissance. It set a new standard for accuracy and quality, as well as being the first known publication of plants from the Americas, such as pumpkin, maize, marigold, potato, and tobacco.

== Editions ==
Original edition

- Fuchs, Leonhart (1542). De historia stirpium commentarii insignes : maximis impensis et uigiliis elaborati, adiectis earundem uiuis plusquam quingentis imaginibus, nunquam antea ad naturae imitationem artificiosius effictis & expressis / c Leonharto Fuchsio medico hac nostra aetate longè clarissimo, autore. Regiones peregrinas pleriq[ue], alij alias, sumptu ingenti, studio indefesso, nec sine discrimine uirae nonnunquam, adierunt, ut simplicium materiae cognoscendae facultatem compararent sibi: eam tibi materiam uniuersam summo & impensarum & temporis compendio, procul discrimine omni, tanquam in uiuo iucundissimoq́[ue] uiridario, magna cum uoluptate, hinc cognoscere licebit. Accessit ijs succincta admodum uocum difficilium & obscurarum passim in hoc opere occurrentium explicatio. Vnà cum quadruplici indice, quorum primus quidem stirpium nomenclaturas Graecas, alter Latinas, tertius officinis seplasiariorum & herbarijs usitatas, quartus Germanicas continebit. Albrecht Meyer (llustrator), Heinrich Füllmaurer (woodblocks), Vitus Rudolph Speckle (printer). Basileae: In officina Isingriniana.

Historical editions

- De Historia Stirpium Commentarii Insignes hand-coloured first edition (1542) in Cambridge Digital Library
- De Historia Stirpium Commentarii Insignes Archived 2019-10-26 at the Wayback Machine (German edition, 1542). From Rare Book Room.
- Eyn Newes hochnutzlichs Büchlin/und Anothomi eynes auffgethonen augs/auch seiner erklärung bewerten purgation/Pflaster/Tollirien/Sälblin pulvern unnd wassern/wie mans machen und brauchen sol (A new, very useful book and anatomy of the open eye/also an explanation of useful purgatives/plasters/poultices/salves, powders and waters/how one should make and use them), 1539.
  - Plate from Eyn Newes hochnutzlichs Büchlin (PDF)
- Den nieuwen herbarius, dat is dat boeck van den cruyden (in Dutch). Basel: Michael Isengrin. 1543.(also available here)
- Fuchs, Leonhart (1549). De historia stirpium commentarii insignes (in Latin). Lyon: Balthazar Arnoullet.
- "New Herbal", extracts, English, Glasgow Library Archive
- Online Galleries, History of Science Collections, University of Oklahoma Libraries High resolution images of works by Leonhart Fuchs in .jpg and .tiff format.

Modern editions

- Frederick Meyer/Emily Trueblood/John Heller (eds.) The Great Herbal of Leonhart Fuchs: De Historia Stirpium Commentarii Insignes, 1542: Vol 1 & 2. (Stanford University Press 1999).
- Klaus Dobat/Werner Dressendorfer (eds.) Leonhart Fuchs: The New Herbal of 1543 (Taschen 2001).
- Fuchs, Leonhart (2022). Dressendörfer, Werner (ed.). The New Herbal. Taschen. ISBN 978-3-8365-8766-2.(Coloured version of German edition, New Kreüterbuch, Basell 1543, in Stadt Bibliothek, Ulm)

== Bibliography ==
- Johnson, Christine R. (2008). The German Discovery of the World: Renaissance Encounters with the Strange and Marvelous. University of Virginia Press. ISBN 978-0-8139-2712-1.
- Sprague, T. A.; Nelmes, E. (1 October 1931). "The Herbal of Leonhart Fuchs". Botanical Journal of the Linnean Society. 48 (325): 545–642. doi:10.1111/j.1095-8339.1931.tb00596.x.
