= Leonard Polonsky =

British American entrepreneur and philanthropist

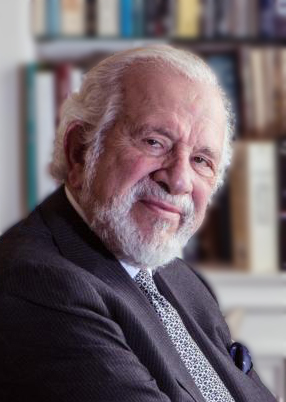
- Born: April 13, 1927; Bay Ridge, Brooklyn, New York City, United States
- Died: March 14, 2025 (aged 97); New York City
- Occupations: Entrepreneur, philanthropist

Leonard Polonsky CBE (April 13, 1927 - March 14, 2025) was a British-American financial services entrepreneur and philanthropist, best known as the founder of Hansard Global plc, and for his extensive philanthropic work through The Polonsky Foundation.

== Early life and education ==
Polonsky was born on April 13, 1927, in Bay Ridge, Brooklyn, New York CityBay Ridge, Brooklyn, New York City. He attended Townsend Harris High School and earned a B.A. from New York University at age 18. After serving in the United States military (1945–1946), he pursued graduate studies in literature at Lincoln College, Oxford, and the Sorbonne (University of Paris), where he received his doctorate in 1952. He also taught in Heidelberg, Germany, before beginning his business career.

== Business Career ==
Polonsky began working in the financial services sector in New York in 1955 and later gained international experience in Rome, Frankfurt, and Zurich.

In 1970 he established the Liberty Life Assurance Company Limited in London, which later became Hansard Global plc. The company was listed on the London Stock Exchange in 2006 and offered life assurance and investment products internationally. During his career Polonsky was known for his leadership in developing internationally focused financial services.

== Philanthropy and The Polonsky Foundation ==
In 1985 Polonsky founded The Polonsky Foundation, a UK‑registered charity supporting cultural heritage, humanities education, research, and the arts across the United Kingdom, the United States, Israel, and Europe. The Foundation funds major digitization projects at leading libraries, including the Bodleian Libraries (Oxford), Cambridge University Library, the British Library, the Library of Congress, the Vatican Apostolic Library, and the New York Public Library, to promote access to cultural heritage.

In 2018, Polonsky and The Polonsky Foundation donated 12 million USD for the creation of "Treasures", a permanent exhibition of treasures from the New York Public Library’s research collections, housed in the Stephen A. Schwarzman Building. The exhibition includes rare items such as a Gutenberg Bible, Thomas Jefferson’s annotated version of the Declaration of Independence, an early copy of the Bill of Rights, and George Washington’s farewell address.

== Honours and Recognition ==
Polonsky was appointed a Commander of the Order of the British Empire (CBE) in 2013 for his charitable services. He held honorary and governance positions at institutions such as Lincoln College, Oxford; the Royal College of Music, London; and the Hebrew University of Jerusalem, where he also established the Polonsky Prizes for Creativity and Originality in the Humanities.

== Death ==
Polonsky died on March 14, 2025, in New York City at the age of 97.
