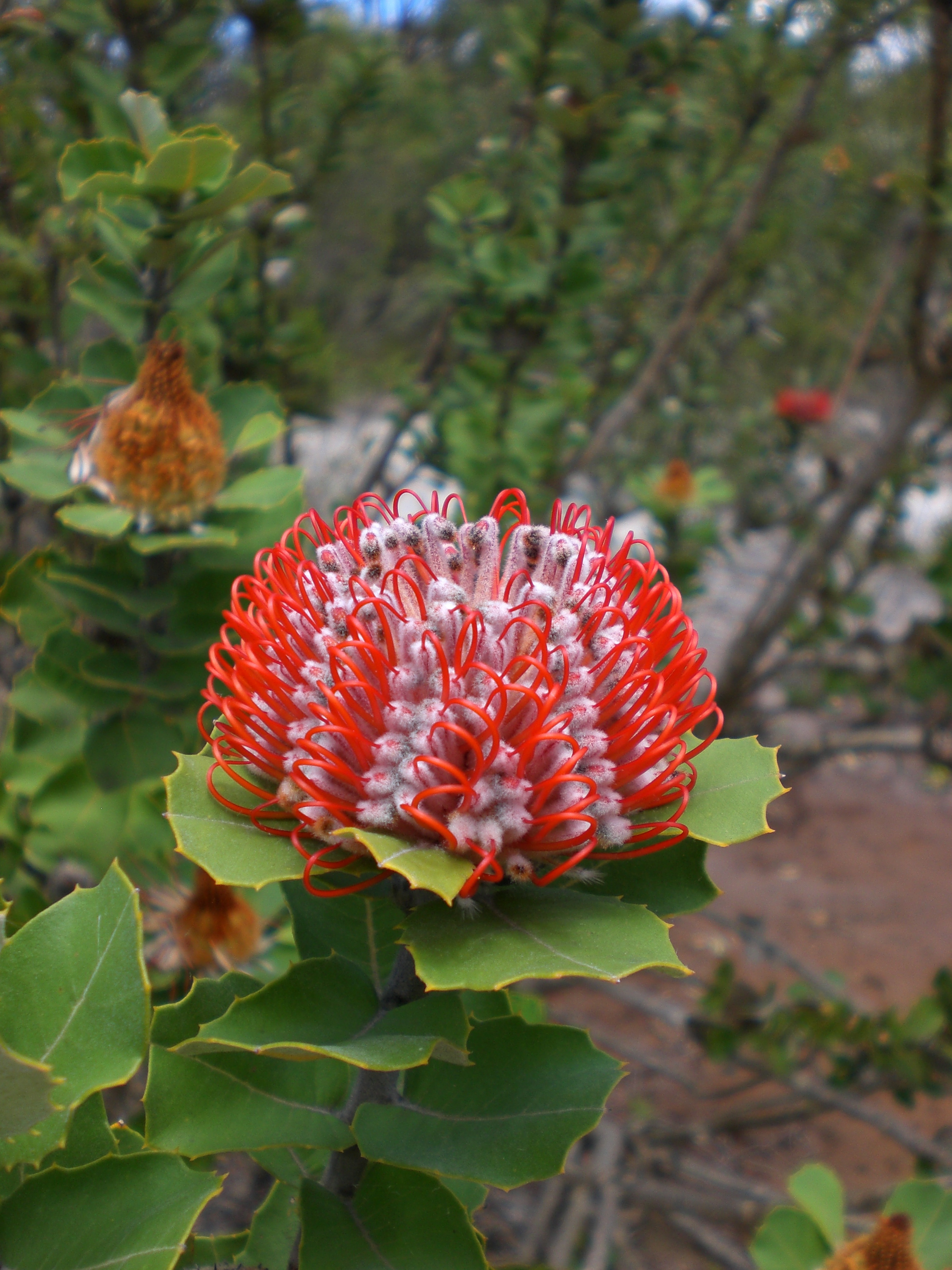
- Flower spike, Little Grove, Albany

Scientific classification
- Kingdom: Plantae
- Clade: Tracheophytes
- Clade: Angiosperms
- Clade: Eudicots
- Order: Proteales
- Family: Proteaceae
- Genus: Banksia
- Species: B. coccinea

Binomial name
- Banksia coccinea R.Br

Synonyms
- Banksia purpurea Schnizl.; Sirmuellera coccinea (R.Br.) Kuntze

= Banksia coccinea =

Scarlet banksia

Species of shrub or small tree

Banksia coccinea, commonly known as the scarlet banksia, waratah banksia or Albany banksia, is an erect shrub or small tree in the family Proteaceae. Its distribution in the wild is along the southwest coast of Western Australia, from Denmark to the Stokes National Park, and north to the Stirling Range, growing on white or grey sand in shrubland, heath, or open woodland. Reaching up to 8 m (26 ft) in height, it is a single-stemmed plant that has oblong leaves, which are 3–9 cm (1.2–3.5 in) long and 2–7 cm (0.8–2.8 in) wide. The prominent red and white flower spikes appear mainly in the spring. As they age, they develop small follicles that store seeds until opened by fire. Though widely occurring, it is highly sensitive to dieback, and large populations of plants have succumbed to the disease.

Collected and described by Robert Brown in the early 19th century, Banksia coccinea appears to be most closely related to Banksia speciosa and B. baxteri. Banksia coccinea plants are killed by bushfire and regenerate from seed. The flowers attract nectar- and insect-feeding birds, particularly honeyeaters, and various insects. Widely considered one of the most attractive Banksia species, B. coccinea is a popular garden plant and one of the most important Banksia species for the cut flower industry; it is grown commercially in several countries, including Australia, South Africa, Canada, the United States, New Zealand, and Israel. In cultivation, B. coccinea grows well in a sunny location on well-drained soil, but it cannot survive in areas with humid or wet summers.

== Description ==
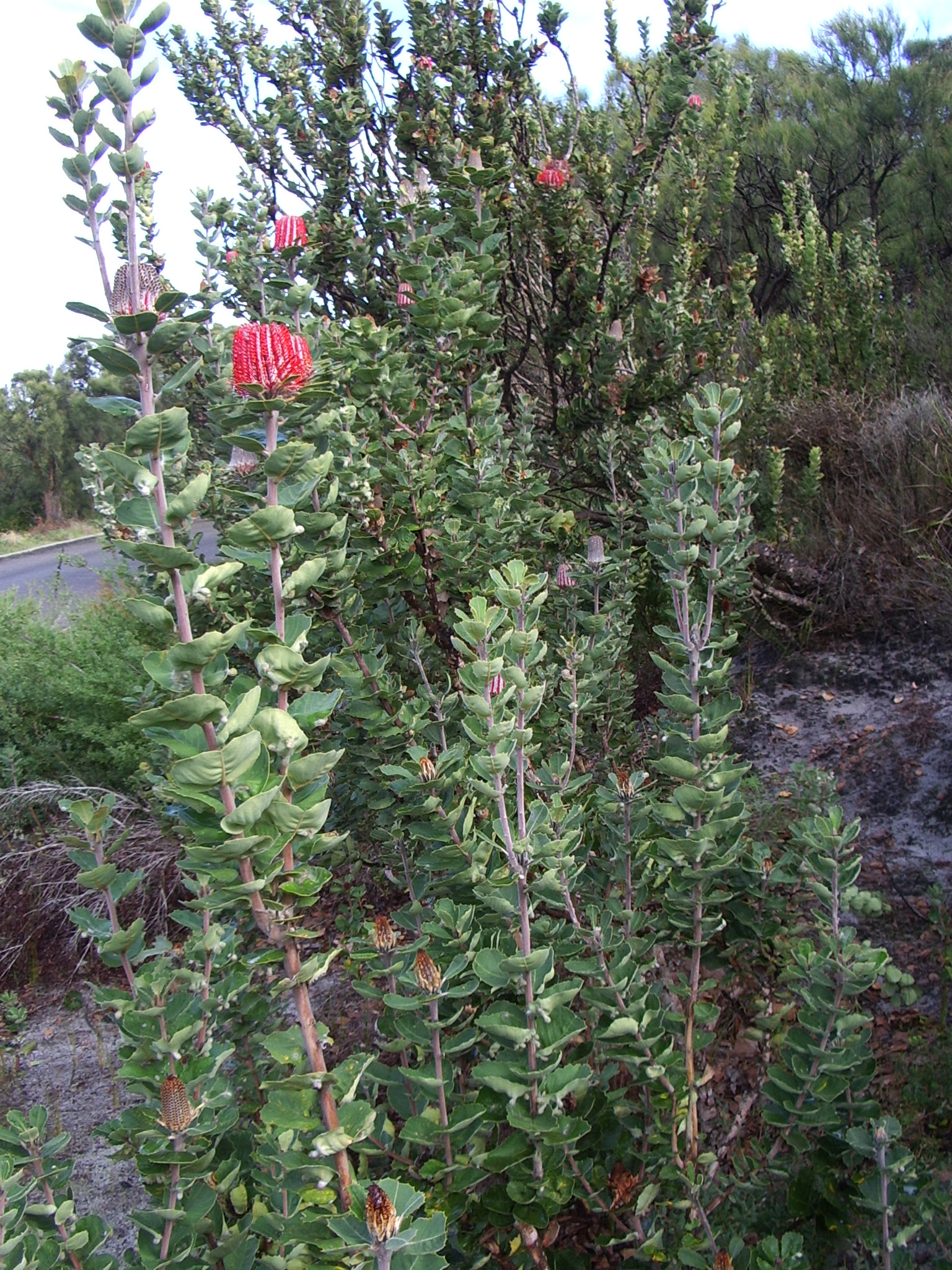
Image of plant, showing erect habit

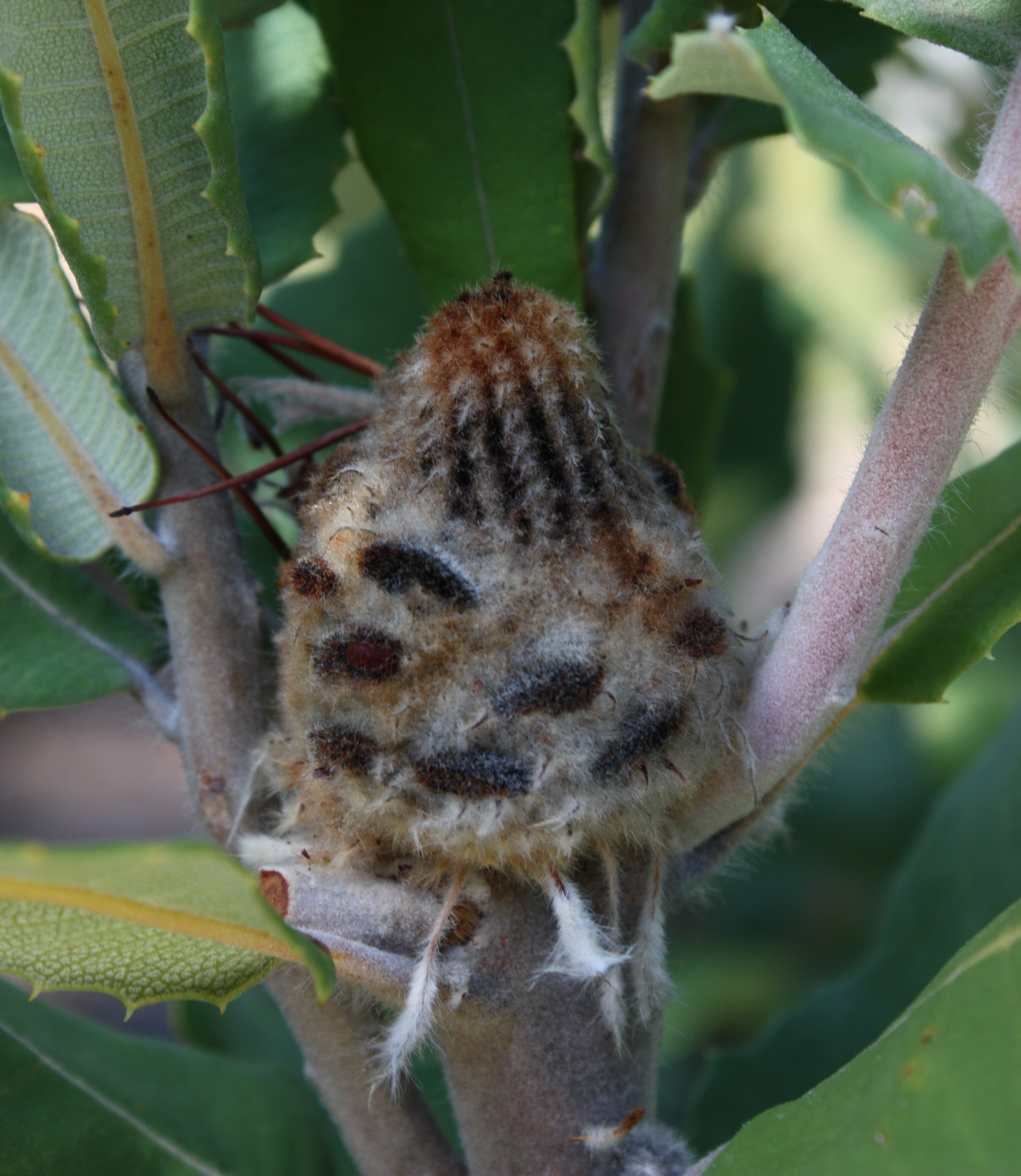
Infructescence, showing small follicles on lower portions

The scarlet banksia grows as an erect shrub or small tree, generally around 2–4 m (6.6–13.1 ft) tall, with little lateral spread. However, it can reach 8 metres (26 ft) in height, particularly in the vicinity of Albany. The trunk is generally single at the base before branching, covered with smooth grey bark that is 2–5 mm (0.08–0.20 in) thick and lacking in lenticels. Peaking in the summer months, the pinkish-brown new growth is densely hairy. The oblong, cordate or obcordate leaves are 3–9 cm (1.2–3.5 in) long and 2–7 cm (0.8–2.8 in) wide, with 3–5 mm (0.12–0.20 in) long petioles. Truncate at the apex, they have dentate margins with small (1–3 mm long) teeth 3–18 mm (0.12–0.71 in) apart, separated by shallow u- or v-shaped sinuses. The upper surface is covered in fine fur when young and becomes smooth with age, while the undersurface is covered with white fur, particularly along the midrib.

The flowering process takes 9–12 months; the stems begin developing microscopically in spring, with no visible evidence of flower spike development for around five months before the buds actually appear. Flower spikes bloom from May to December or January, peaking between July and October. The distinctive inflorescences arise from the ends of one-year-old branchlets. Squat and roughly cylindrical, they are 3–6 cm (1.2–2.4 in) high and 8–10 cm (3.1–3.9 in) wide. A field study on the southern sandplains revealed an average count of around 286 individual flowers on each spike. The white flower is covered in grey or pale brown fur, with little variation in colour. The style is generally scarlet, but can be dark red, orange, or pink. The perianth is 3–3.2 cm (1.2–1.3 in) long, while the style is 4–4.8 cm (1.6–1.9 in) long and strongly recurved or looped until they are released at anthesis. Anthesis is acropetal; the flowers open from the base up the spike to the apex. The flowers of all banksias arise in a spiral pattern around the flower spike axis; however, in Banksia coccinea, they develop into distinctive vertical columns, strongly accentuated by large gaps in between. Paired in columns, the red styles contrast with the grey-white perianth, making a striking flower spike.

The infructescence is small, with up to 20 small follicles concentrated at the lower end of the spike. Each follicle is 6–8 mm (0.2–0.3 in) long, 1–2 mm (0.04–0.08 in) high, and 2–3 mm (0.08–0.12 in) wide and usually opens with fire. The 1.1–1.4 cm (0.43–0.55 in) long seed is composed of the cuneate (wedge-shaped) seed body proper, measuring 0.5–0.7 cm (0.2–0.3 in) long and 0.4–0.7 cm (0.2–0.3 in) wide, and a papery wing. One side, the outer surface, is grey-black and wrinkled, and the other—the inner surface—protrudes and is black and glistening. The seeds are separated by a dark brown seed separator, roughly the same shape as the seeds, with a depression where the seed body sits adjacent to it in the follicle. It measures 1.1–1.4 cm (0.4–0.6 in) long and 0.7–0.8 cm (0.28–0.31 in) wide. The dull green cotyledons of seedlings are 0.8–0.9 cm (0.3–0.4 in) long and 0.5–0.6 cm (0.20–0.24 in) wide, described by Alex George as "cuneate to obovate". Each cotyledon has a 1 mm (0.04 in) auricle at its base. The thick, smooth hypocotyl is 1 cm (0.5 in) high and 1.5 mm thick. The seedling leaves are crowded above the cotyledons and linear to spathulate in shape, with recurved and deeply serrated margins with v-shaped sinuses, almost dividing the leaves into triangular lobes. The first pair is 0.8–1.2 cm (0.3–0.5 in) long, with the next 2–4 leaves up to 1.7 cm (0.7 in) long. Successive leaves are more obovate in shape and up to 4 cm (1.6 in) long and 1.4 cm (0.6 in) wide. The seedling stems are covered in white hair.

== Taxonomy ==
=== Discovery and naming ===
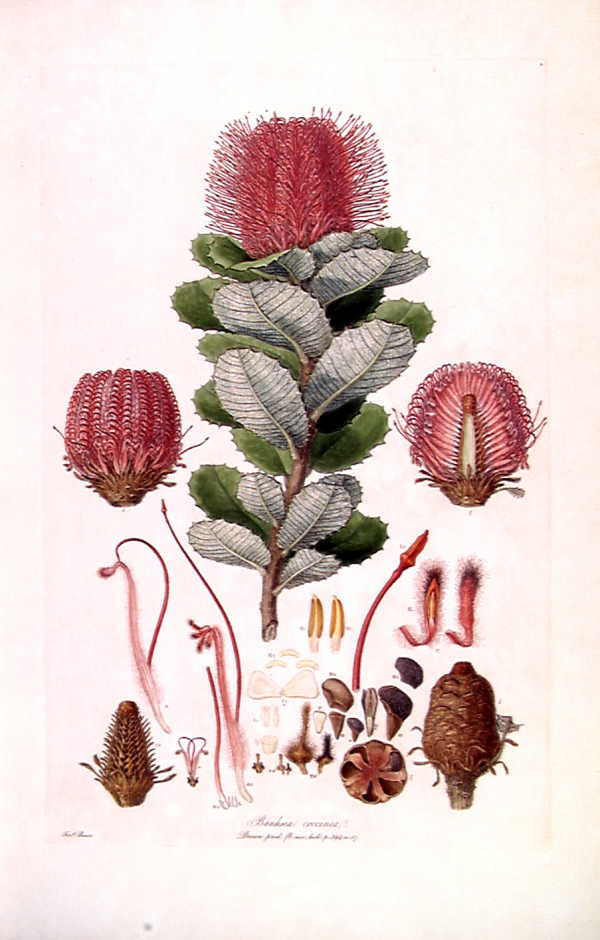
Plate 3 of Ferdinand Bauer's 1813 Illustrationes Florae Novae Hollandiae

The first known specimens of Banksia coccinea were collected in December 1801, during the visit to King George Sound of HMS Investigator under the command of Matthew Flinders. Botanist Robert Brown, botanical artist Ferdinand Bauer, and gardener Peter Good were on board. All three men gathered plant specimens, but those collected by Bauer and Good were incorporated into Brown's herbarium without attribution, so it is impossible to identify this species's actual collector. The surviving specimen of B. coccinea, held by the Natural History Museum in London, is annotated in Brown's hand "King George IIIds Sound Princess Royal Harbour especially near the observatory". The observatory was apparently located in what is now the central business district of Albany. No further information on the collection is available, as the species is mentioned in neither Brown's nor Good's diary.

Good also made a separate seed collection, which included B. coccinea, and Bauer drew the species. Like nearly all of Bauer's field drawings of Proteaceae, the original field sketch of B. coccinea was destroyed in a Hofburg fire in 1945. However, a watercolour painting by Bauer, based on his field sketches, still survives at the Natural History Museum in London, and a hand-coloured copper engraving from that painting was published as Plate 3 of Bauer's 1813 Illustrationes Florae Novae Hollandiae. German botanist Adalbert Schnizlein described B. purpurea in 1843, now regarded as a synonym of B. coccinea. Common names include scarlet banksia, waratah banksia, and Albany banksia.

Brown published the species in his 1810 On the Proteaceae of Jussieu, its species name derived from the Latin coccineus meaning 'scarlet', and referring to the pistils. He recorded 31 species of Banksia in his 1810 work Prodromus Florae Novae Hollandiae et Insulae Van Diemen, and, in his taxonomic arrangement, placed the taxon in the subgenus Banksia verae, the "true banksias", because the inflorescence is a typical Banksia flower spike. By the time Carl Meissner published his 1856 arrangement of the genus, there were 58 described Banksia species. Meissner divided Brown's Banksia verae, which had been renamed Eubanksia by Stephan Endlicher in 1847, into four series based on leaf properties. He placed B. coccinea in the series Quercinae.

George Bentham published a thorough revision of Banksia in his landmark publication Flora Australiensis in 1870. In Bentham's arrangement, the recognised Banksia species were reduced from 60 to 46. Bentham defined four sections based on leaf, style, and pollen-presenter characters. Banksia coccinea was placed in section Orthostylis.

In 1891, Otto Kuntze, in his Revisio Generum Plantarum, rejected the generic name Banksia L.f., because the name Banksia had previously been published in 1776 as Banksia J.R.Forst & G.Forst, referring to the genus now known as Pimelea. Kuntze proposed Sirmuellera as an alternative, referring to this species as Sirmuellera coccinea. This application of the principle of priority was largely ignored by Kuntze's contemporaries, and Banksia L.f. was formally conserved, and Sirmuellera rejected in 1940.

Alex George published a new taxonomic arrangement of Banksia in his classic 1981 monograph The genus Banksia L.f. (Proteaceae). Endlicher's Eubanksia became B. subgenus Banksia, divided into three sections. George placed Banksia coccinea in its own series—Banksia series Coccineae—within the section B. section Banksia on account of a unique combination of characters, namely the vertical arrangement of flowers on the spike, combined with the branched open habit, broad leaves, and very small follicles. Members of the series Quercinae and five species within the series Spicigerae share the vertically aligned flowers, but do not wholly exhibit the other characters.

Kevin Thiele and Pauline Ladiges published a new arrangement for the genus in 1996; their morphological cladistic analysis yielded a cladogram significantly different from George's arrangement. They were uncertain of B. coccinea's placement as it had highly autapomorphic characteristics, which made analysis of its relationships difficult. Hence, in their arrangement, it was located within the series Banksia but not allocated to a subseries (incertae sedis). It was reclassified in its own section, Coccinea, in 1996 by Tina Maguire and colleagues; pollen compatibility tests indicated its pollen was most compatible with Banksia ericifolia, B. micrantha, and B. sphaerocarpa, all of section Oncostylis. However, they did not place it in that section as all members of Oncostylis have hooked styles at anthesis. George upheld this in his monograph for the Flora of Australia series. B. coccinea's placement within Banksia, according to the Flora of Australia, is as follows:

Genus Banksia

Subgenus Banksia

Section Banksia sect. Coccineae

B. coccinea

In 2002, a molecular study by Austin Mast again showed Banksia coccinea to be the next closest relative of a group comprising Banksia speciosa and B. baxteri and only distantly related to other members of the series Banksia. This was reinforced in a 2013 molecular study by Marcel Cardillo and colleagues using chloroplast DNA and combining it with earlier results.

Mast, Eric Jones, and Shawn Havery published the results of their cladistic analyses of DNA sequence data for Banksia in 2005. They inferred a phylogeny greatly different from the accepted taxonomic arrangement, including finding Banksia to be paraphyletic with respect to Dryandra. A new taxonomic arrangement was not published at the time, but early in 2007, Mast and Thiele initiated a rearrangement by transferring Dryandra to Banksia, and publishing B. subgenus Spathulatae for the species having spoon-shaped cotyledons; in this way, they also redefined the autonym B. subg. Banksia. They foreshadowed publishing a full arrangement once DNA sampling of Dryandra was complete. In the meantime, if Mast and Thiele's nomenclatural changes are taken as an interim arrangement, then B. coccinea is placed in B. subg. Banksia.

No subspecies are recognised, although DNA analysis showed that a population at Redmond was genetically distinctive, while those at Gull Rock, Two Peoples Bay, and Cheyne Beach were unusually diverse.

Noongar people know the tree as Waddib.

== Distribution and habitat ==
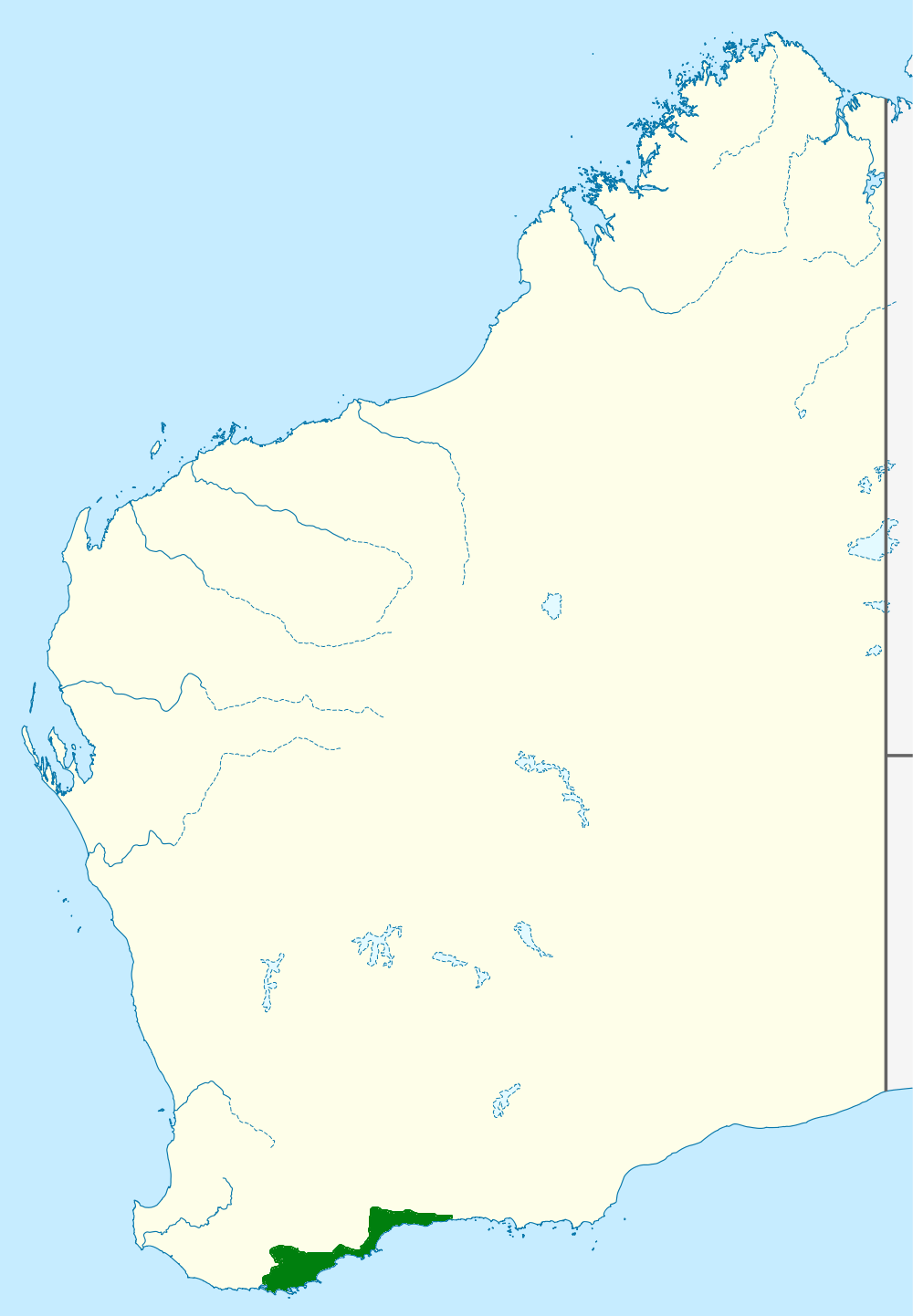
Range along the southern West Australian coast

Banksia coccinea occurs close to the south coast of Western Australia, from the Hay River northeast of Denmark, Albany in the west, east to Stokes National Park southeast of Munglinup, and inland to the Stirling Range and the northern border of Fitzgerald River National Park. Around 47% of plants are protected in conservation areas, while 13% are on road verges. It prefers deep white or grey sand, among tall shrubland, heath, mallee-heath, associated with such species as B. baxteri, B. speciosa, B. attenuata, and Lambertia inermis, or low open woodland in the Stirling Range and near Albany, where it is found with Eucalyptus marginata, Banksia attenuata, and B. ilicifolia. Most of its range has a gently undulating topography, but it also occurs on a steep rocky slope at Ellen Peak in the Stirling Ranges. The annual rainfall is 400–800 mm (16–31 in).

== Ecology ==
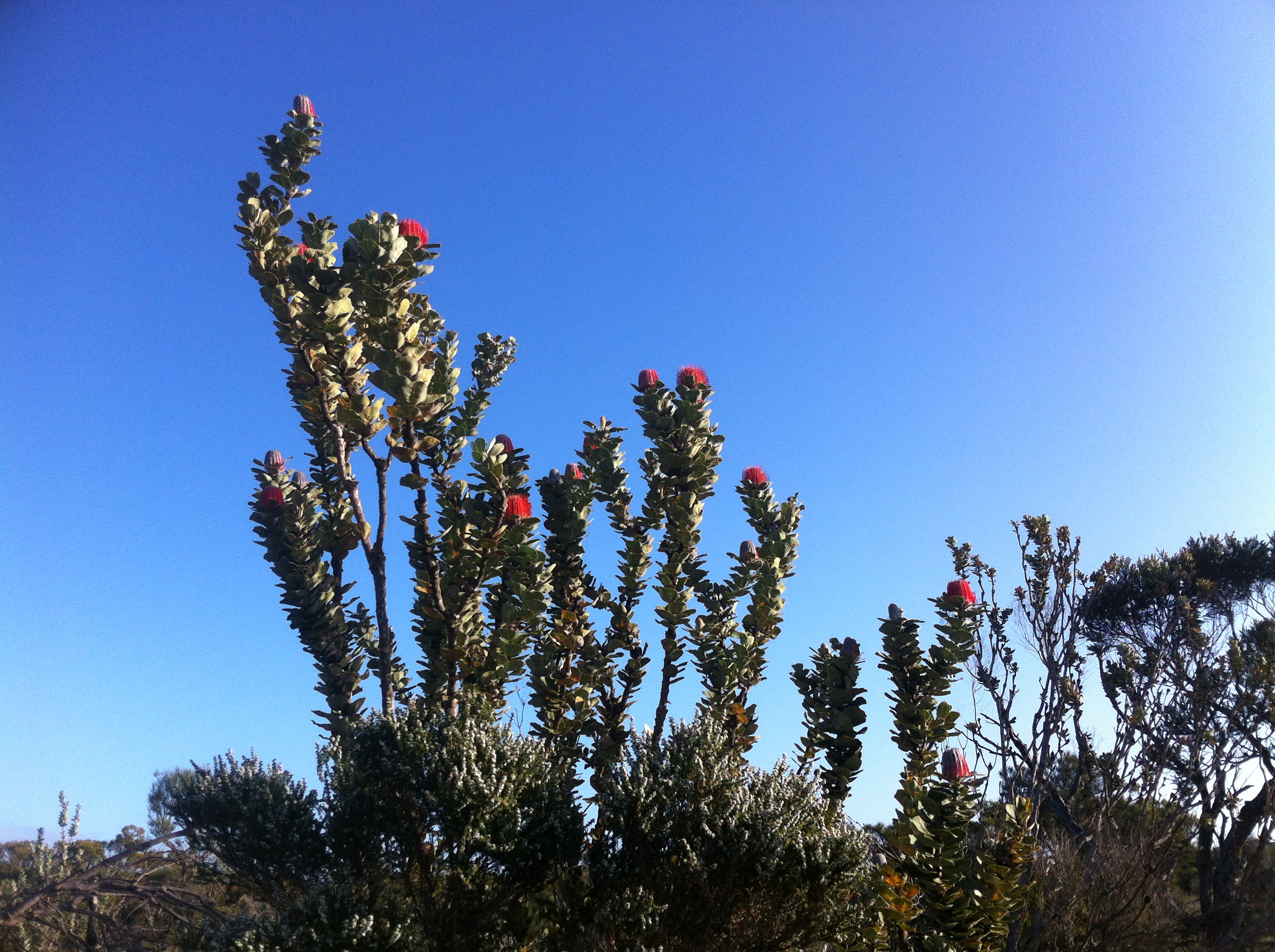
Banksia coccinea at Gull Rock National Park

A field study conducted around Albany found the honey possum (Tarsipes rostratus) sometimes visits Banksia coccinea, as do the New Holland honeyeater (Phylidonyris novaehollandiae), white-cheeked honeyeater (P. nigra), and western spinebill (Acanthorhynchus superciliosus). Banksia coccinea flowers are visited by colletid bees Hylaeus alcyoneus and H. sanguinipictus. The short-billed black cockatoo breaks off old cones with follicles to eat the seed, often doing so before the seed is ripe.

B. coccinea is killed by fire and regenerates from seed released from burnt follicles. It has some degree of serotiny, that is, it has an aerial seed bank in its canopy in the form of the follicles of the old flower spikes. However, seed numbers are less than other co-occurring banksia species on the southern plains and peak several years after a fire. Unusually for banksias, B. coccinea can release seed with resulting seedlings growing in the absence of a bushfire trigger. Plants flower and fruit three years after germination and are shorter-lived than other banksias, appearing in poor health or dying before 20 years of age. They appear to be suited to fire intervals of less than 20 years.

Manipulating growing conditions on plants in cultivation showed that longer daylight (16 hours vs 8 hours) led to the development of more flower spikes, indicating that flower initiation was related to day length.

Extremely sensitive to dieback caused by Phytophthora cinnamomi, Banksia coccinea is an indicator species for the presence of the disease. There is no known means of eradicating dieback. Much of the Stirling Range National Park is infested, though Fitzgerald River National Park has been largely spared. Applying phosphite to infested areas has been shown to reduce the mortality rates to around 50%. B. coccinea has shown some symptoms of toxicity to the application of phosphite, with some patchy necrosis of leaves, but the plant's uptake of the compound is somewhat lower compared with other shrub species. Unusually, the symptoms do not appear to be proportional to exposure levels.

Dying stands of B. coccinea were observed in 1989, and the fungus Cryptodiaporthe melanocraspedia was isolated as the cause in 1995. The disease, a form of aerial canker, manifested initially as dead, dry, brown leaves and the tips of new growth. Plants would die from the top downwards, with larger branches affected over time. Under the outer bark, orange and brown patches of necrosis spread out from leaf nodes until they encircle the stem, which then dies. Flower spikes may be affected during the flowering season. In humid spells during warm weather, white or pink spore tendrils are produced on dead wood. One affected stand monitored over three years from October 1989 to June 1992 showed a 97% mortality of plants (compared with a baseline 40%). Investigators Bryan Shearer and colleagues isolated another virulent pathogen that they identified as a species of Zythiostroma; however, it appeared to invoke an immune response in the plant. This immune response, coupled with the fact that it had not been observed in the wild, led them to believe it was not a major pathogen of the species. This species has since been reclassified and named as Luteocirrhus shearii.

B. coccinea is a host for the gall midge Dasineura banksiae, a species of fly that attacks and lays eggs on the leaves between late October and early December. The round white hairy galls are 5–7 mm in diameter and generally contain one larva, or up to five on severely infested plants. The larvae moult and feed from January to March, when they reduce activity until early October. Although these are not harmful to the plant, they disfigure the cut foliage, reducing its value.

== Cultivation ==
Widely considered one of the most attractive Banksia species, B. coccinea is a popular garden plant and one of the most important Banksia species for the cut flower industry; it is grown commercially in Australia, South Africa, Canada, the United States, New Zealand, Israel, and trialled in France, Spain, and South America. Its striking terminal inflorescences and furry new growth are its main horticultural attributes. However, it is highly sensitive to dieback and succumbs readily when exposed. It is difficult to keep alive in areas of heavy soils, summer rainfall, or humidity, such as the Australian east coast. Furthermore, flowering may be sparse or not occur when cultivated in warmer climates such as Perth. Pruning promotes branching, which leads to more flower spikes being produced.

Propagation is by seed, though these can be difficult to extract from the follicles. Seeds do not require any treatment before sowing, and germination takes 12 to 48 days. Cultivars require propagation by cutting for progeny to grow true. Cuttings are slow to strike. Attempts to graft B. coccinea have met with little success.

In a breeding program conducted by Margaret Sedgley of the Department of Horticulture, Viticulture and Oenology, Waite Agricultural Research Institute of the University of Adelaide in Adelaide, South Australia, two forms of Banksia coccinea were bred, registered under plant breeders' rights (PBR), and commercially propagated, mainly for the cut flower industry. Banksia 'Waite Flame' is an early flowering, somewhat orange-hued form, and B. 'Waite Crimson' is a red-flowering form that peaks mid-season.
