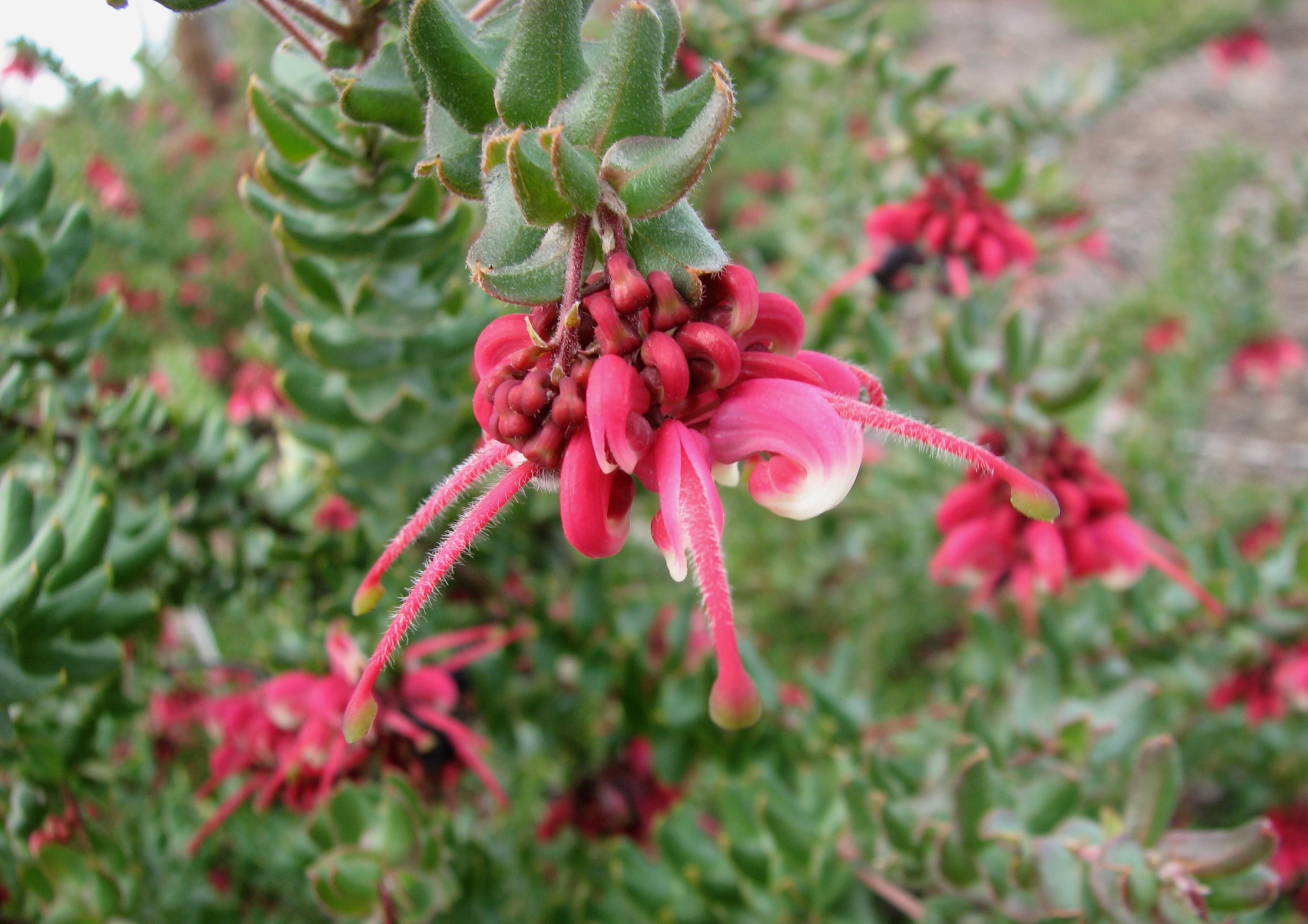
- Grevillea baueri subsp. asperula

Conservation status
- Vulnerable (IUCN 3.1)

Scientific classification
- Kingdom: Plantae
- Clade: Embryophytes
- Clade: Tracheophytes
- Clade: Spermatophytes
- Clade: Angiosperms
- Clade: Eudicots
- Order: Proteales
- Family: Proteaceae
- Genus: Grevillea
- Species: G. baueri

Binomial name
- Grevillea baueri R.Br.

Subspecies
- Grevillea baueri subsp. asperula; Grevillea baueri R.Br. subsp. baueri

= Grevillea baueri =

Species of shrub endemic to Australia

Grevillea baueri, commonly known as Bauer's grevillea, is a species of flowering plant in the family Proteaceae and is endemic to the coastal ranges of south-eastern New South Wales. It is a low, spreading to erect shrub with mostly oblong to egg-shaped leaves with red to pink and cream-coloured or yellow flowers.

== Description ==
Grevillea baueri is a low, spreading to erect shrub that typically grows to a height of up to 0.3–1.5 m (1 ft 0 in – 4 ft 11 in). Its leaves are simple, oblong to egg-shaped, 10–30 mm (0.39–1.18 in) long and 3–15 mm (0.12–0.59 in) wide with the edges turned down or rolled under, the lower surface more or less glabrous. The flowers are arranged in groups of eight to eighteen near the ends of branches or in leaf axils on a rachis 2–5 mm (0.079–0.197 in) long, and are red to pink and cream-coloured to yellow near the tip, with a red style. The pistil is usually 16–23 mm (0.63–0.91 in) long, the ovary covered with long hairs. Flowering mainly occurs in winter and spring and the fruit is a hairy follicle 13–14 mm (0.51–0.55 in) long.

== Taxonomy ==
Grevillea baueri was first formally described in 1810 by botanist Robert Brown in Transactions of the Linnean Society of London. The specific epithet honours brothers Franz and Ferdinand Bauer who were both noted botanical illustrators from Austria.

In 1986, Donald McGillivray described two subspecies of G. baueri and the names are accepted by the Australian Plant Census:

- Grevillea baueri subsp. asperula McGill. is often an open plant with leaves 5–10 mm (0.20–0.39 in) wide, the upper surface rough with many granules, and has branched, down-curved flower groups;
- Grevillea baueri R.Br. subsp. baueri is often a compact plant with leaves 3–7 mm (0.12–0.28 in) wide, the upper surface mostly smooth, and has simple, erect flower groups.

== Distribution and habitat ==
Subspecies asperula grows in heath or open woodland from near Nerriga to near Nowra and the northern edge of the Budawang Range and subsp. baueri is found in woodland and heath between Camden, Picton, Mittagong and Bundanoon in the coastal ranges of south-eastern New South Wales.

== Conservation status ==
Grevillea baueri is listed as vulnerable on the IUCN Red List of Threatened Species. It has a limited distribution which is likely severely fragmented and the number of mature individuals, as well as the quality and extent of habitat are declining.

== Use in horticulture ==
This species has attractive foliage and flowers although the latter blacken after maturity, which can detract from the overall appearance. It is frost hardy in Australia and preferes a position with reasonable drainage and in full sun or partial shade. Plants are propagated by cuttings.
