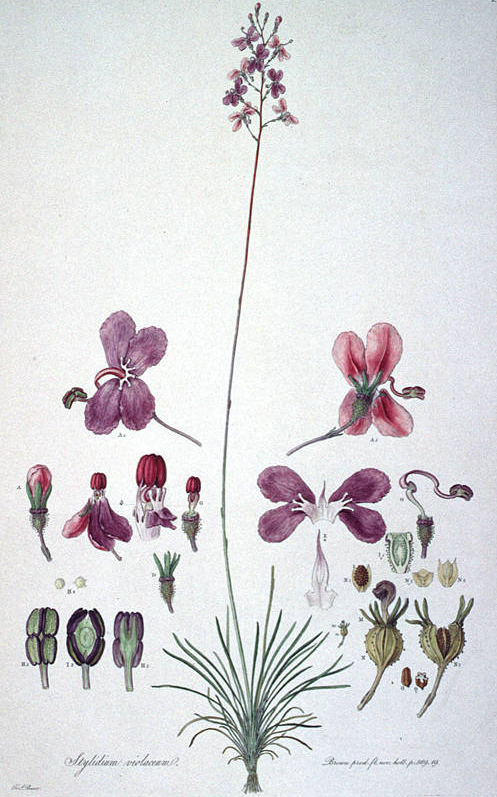
- S. violaceum print from Ferdinand Bauer's 1813 Illustrationes Florae Novae Hollandiae.

Scientific classification
- Kingdom: Plantae
- Clade: Tracheophytes
- Clade: Angiosperms
- Clade: Eudicots
- Clade: Asterids
- Order: Asterales
- Family: Stylidiaceae
- Genus: Stylidium
- Subgenus: Stylidium subg. Tolypangium
- Section: Stylidium sect. Saxifragoidea
- Species: S. violaceum

Binomial name
- Stylidium violaceum R.Br.

= Stylidium violaceum =

Species of carnivorous plant

Stylidium violaceum, the violet triggerplant, is a dicotyledonous plant that belongs to the genus Stylidium (family Stylidiaceae). S. violaceum is endemic to Australia and is found primarily in the southwestern region of Western Australia. It can grow up to 50 cm including the scape. The mostly purple flowers are 10 mm tall and 6 mm broad. Leaves are 5 cm long and about 4 mm broad. Flowering occurs mainly from October to January. S. violaceum is found in locations with sandy or loamy sand soil texture conditions on hillslopes, dunes, or winter wet depressions and swamps.

== See also ==
- List of Stylidium species
