= Banksia 'Waite Flame' =

Cultivar of Banksia coccinea

- Species: B. coccinea
- Cultivar: 'Waite Flame'
- Origin: Waite Agricultural Research Institute, University of Adelaide, South Australia

Banksia 'Waite Flame' is a variety (in the plant breeders' rights sense) of Banksia. A selected form of B. coccinea (Albany or Scarlet Banksia), it flowers early in the season and has a more orange-hued bloom than its parent species.

It was bred in 1989 from an open pollination seedling of B. coccinea during a breeding program conducted by Dr Margaret Sedgley of the Department of Horticulture, Viticulture and Oenology, Waite Agricultural Research Institute of the University of Adelaide in Adelaide, South Australia. Three years later it was registered as a variety by Luminis Pty Ltd, a wholly owned subsidiary of the university; the registration was granted on 25 October 1994, but withdrawn on 13 August 2007.

It is claimed to be distinguishable in its early flowering (June and July, contrasting to July to December, peaking in August for the species coccinea in general).
