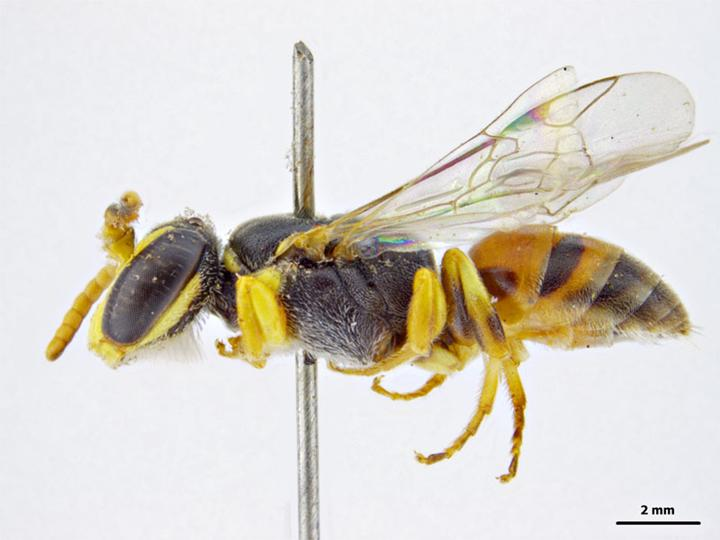
- male

Scientific classification
- Kingdom: Animalia
- Phylum: Arthropoda
- Clade: Pancrustacea
- Class: Insecta
- Order: Hymenoptera
- Family: Colletidae
- Genus: Hylaeus
- Species: H. sanguinipictus

Binomial name
- Hylaeus sanguinipictus (Cockerell, 1914)

= Hylaeus sanguinipictus =

Species of bee

Hylaeus sanguinipictus is a bee species endemic to Western Australia. It was described in 1914 from material collected in Yallingup by Theodore Dru Alison Cockerell as Prosopis sanguinipicta.

Like its relative the banksia bee (Hylaeus alcyoneus), H. sanguinipictus's expression of sexual dimorphism is unusual — the males of the species are larger than the females; in most other types of bee, females are larger than males. The males perch and defend Banksia inflorescences while waiting to mate with females, and combat other males.

Western Australian banksias that the bee has been recorded visiting include B. menziesii and B. prionotes.
