= Banksia 'Waite Crimson' =

Cultivar of Banksia coccinea

- Species: B. coccinea
- Cultivar: 'Waite Crimson'
- Origin: Waite Agricultural Research Institute, University of Adelaide, South Australia

Banksia 'Waite Crimson' is a variety (in the plant breeders' rights sense) of Banksia. A selected form of B. coccinea (Albany or Scarlet Banksia), it flowers late in the season.

It was bred in 1989 from an open pollination seedling of B. coccinea at Blewitt Springs in South Australia, during a breeding program conducted by Dr Margaret Sedgley of the Department of Horticulture, Viticulture and Oenology, Waite Agricultural Research Institute of the University of Adelaide in Adelaide, South Australia. Three years later it was registered as a variety by Luminis Pty Ltd, a wholly owned subsidiary of the university; the registration was granted on 18 November 1992, but terminated on 1 August 2007.

It is claimed to be distinguishable in the lateness of its flowering season (September to December, peaking in October, contrasting to July to December, peaking in August for the species coccinea in general), with a slightly shorter, squatter inflorescence.
