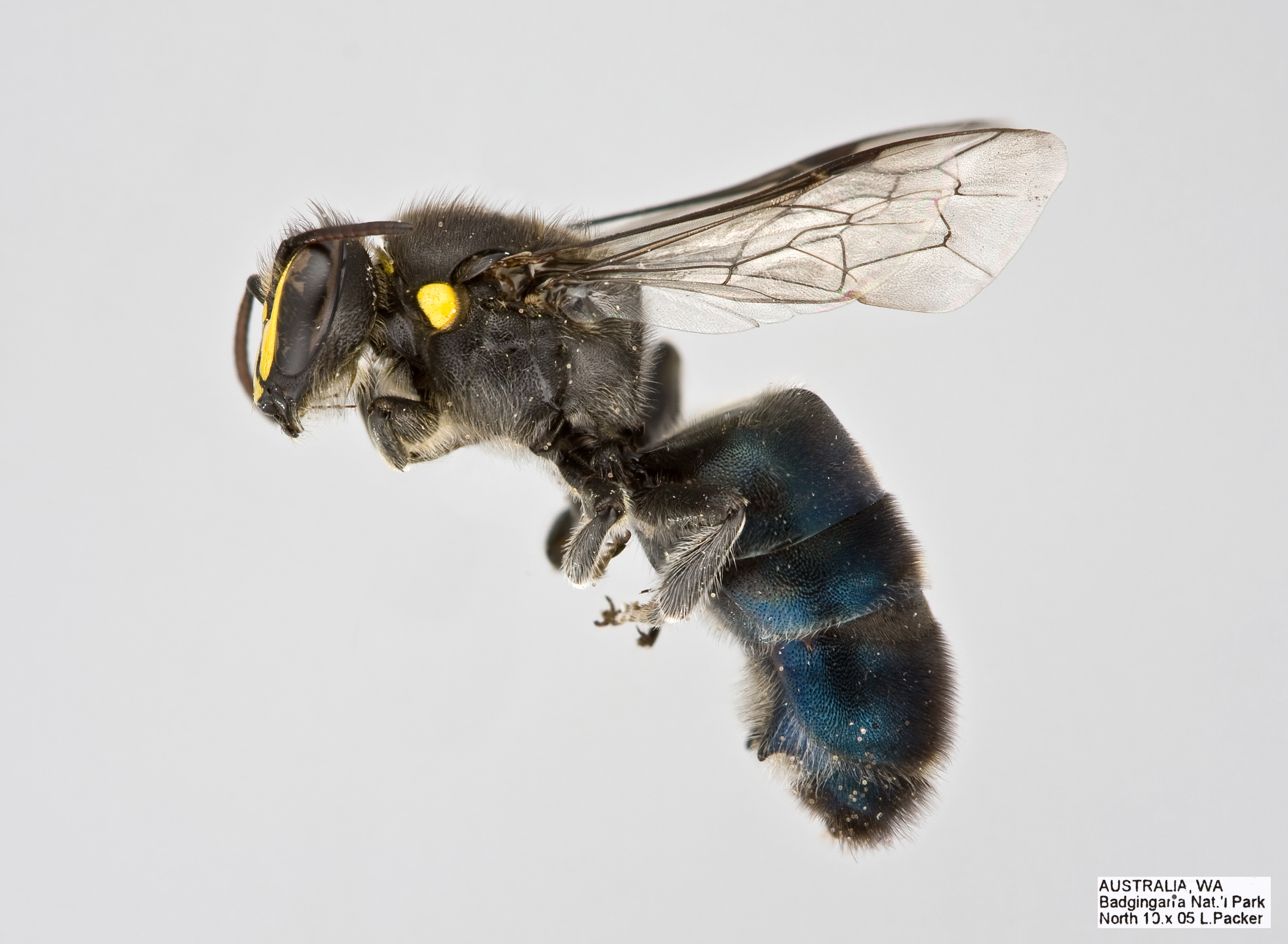
- Hylaeus alcyoneus male

Scientific classification
- Kingdom: Animalia
- Phylum: Arthropoda
- Clade: Pancrustacea
- Class: Insecta
- Order: Hymenoptera
- Family: Colletidae
- Genus: Hylaeus
- Species: H. alcyoneus

Binomial name
- Hylaeus alcyoneus Erichson, 1842

= Hylaeus alcyoneus =

Banksia bee

Species of bee

Hylaeus alcyoneus, commonly known as the banksia bee, is a species of solitary bee in the family Colletidae. It is common in coastal regions of southern Australia. Both sexes are mostly black with a metallic blue abdomen. It is usually found on or near Banksia flowers, but it will visit other flowering species in eastern Australia. In areas with high honeybee densities, the banksia bee produces less nests due to competition for floral resources.

== Taxonomy ==
The banksia bee was originally described by German entomologist Wilhelm Ferdinand Erichson in 1842. Its specific epithet is derived from the Ancient Greek halcyon (meaning “kingfisher”), relating to the kingfisher-blue colour of the abdomen. The common name refers to the species’ particular fondness for visiting banksia flowers. It is the only species in the subgenus Macrohylaeus, as proposed by Charles Michener in 1965.

== Description ==
This is a relatively large and robustly-built species of bee, measuring 8.5-12mm in length. On average, males are significantly larger than females, which is unusual amongst hymenopterans. Both sexes have a black head and thorax, black legs and a metallic blue abdomen. Females have three vertical yellow marks on the face, while in males the face is more extensively yellow. The tubercle next to each wing socket is yellow, and males have a yellow stripe across the front of the thorax (just behind the head).

There is a sparse covering of moderately long hair over most of the body and legs. The hair is dark on top of the head, top of the thorax and end of the abdomen, but white everywhere else. Males tend to have denser and more conspicuous hair. Large males have hairier abdomens than smaller males – an example of allometry.

Large males have a pair of spines on the underside of the abdomen. These spines are reduced or absent in smaller males, and absent in females. The antennae are black on the upper side and brownish on the underside. In males the first antennal segments (scapes) are slightly expanded and they bear epidermal glands. The mandibles have three teeth in females, two in males.

== Distribution and habitat ==
The banksia bee is endemic to Australia, with records from Western Australia, South Australia (including Kangaroo Island), Victoria, Tasmania, New South Wales and Queensland. It prefers a temperate climate, but also extends into subtropical zones. It is common in coastal heaths.

== Behaviour and ecology ==
=== Male behaviour ===
Male banksia bees have evolved resource-defence strategies to maximise their chances of mating. Large males perch on Banksia inflorescences, preferring the flower spikes that are partly opened and high on the tree or shrub. Each individual will typically position itself at or near the top of a spike, looking outwards alertly. Periodically, the wings are beaten rapidly for several seconds. At the same time, the abdomen is extended and frequently groomed with the hind legs. This is believed to be a way of dispersing pheromones produced by glands in the abdomen. The rapid wing-beating display is often triggered by the approach of other insects, and researchers have even triggered it by throwing small bits of dark wood.

If a rival male attempts to land on an occupied Banksia flower spike, violent fights can occur, which involve chasing, biting, grappling and thumping with the abdomen. Grappling pairs commonly tumble from the spike before one male returns alone to claim it. Larger males have a more strongly developed pair of spines on the underside of the abdomen, and they almost always win these battles.

Small males are forced to perch on flower spikes that are closer to the ground, or to non-aggressively patrol circuits that take them from one flower spike to another in search of unmated females. On average, territorial males weigh almost twice as much as patrolling males.

Sometimes a male will leave his perch on a Banksia flower spike to mark territory. He will fly to nearby grass stems or leaves of shrubs and then walk quickly up the vegetation holding his body close to it. After about one minute he returns to his perch.

=== Female behaviour and nesting ===
Mating is rarely recorded, and it is likely females mate only once. Females don’t form dense nesting aggregations, instead building solitary nests in widely scattered locations. The nests are built in pre-existing cavities in wood, such as hollow twigs or emergent holes of wood-boring insects in tree trunks. They have been found in a dead Acacia twig, and also in the dead stalk of a Xanthorrhoea. The preferred cavity diameter is around 7mm.

Females forage for nectar and pollen primarily on the flowering spikes of certain Bankisa species, and they prefer spikes with some unopened flowers. If no pollen is left on the open flowers, they bite the unopened flowers (buds) to get to the pollen inside. They do not forage during rain. In most bee species the pollen is collected on the outside of the body, but the banksia bee swallows it instead, as do other members of the Hylaeinae subfamily. After filling up on nectar and pollen, females often perch on nearby vegetation and repetitively regurgitate and swallow the sticky contents of their stomach in a process known as “bubbling”. This concentrates and thickens the sweet and protein-rich mix before it is taken back to the nest.

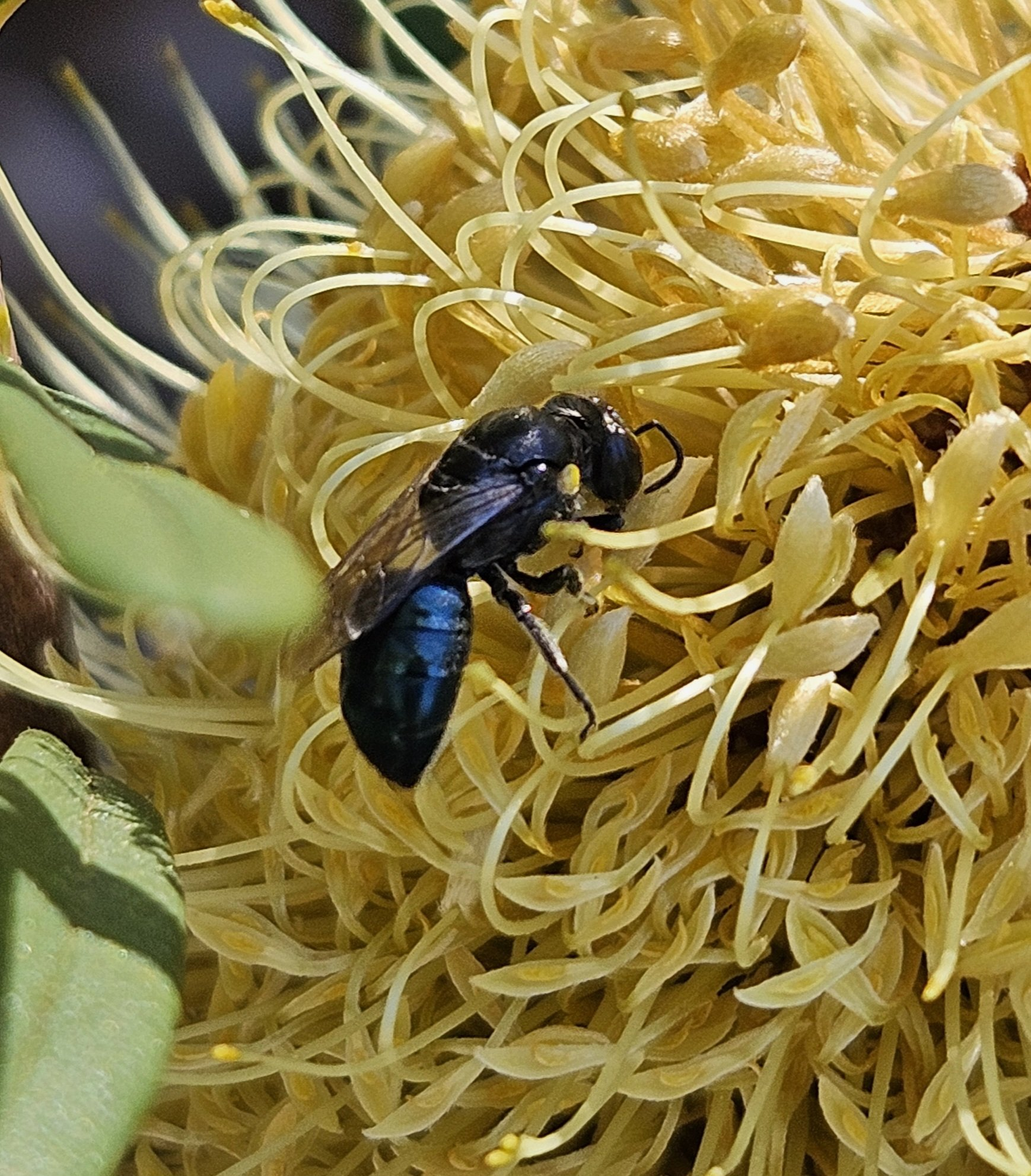
Hylaeus alcyoneus on Banksia marginata.

Within a nest cavity, the female constructs a series of brood cells (up to six), with each cell around 12mm long. The cells are separated from each other by a thin, cellophane-like material which the female secretes from her mouth. A single egg is laid in each cell, and each one is provisioned with a paste of pollen and nectar that is regurgitated by the female. The whole nest is finally sealed with a thick, brownish septum.

As in other Hymenopterans, banksia bees are haplodiploid, with females controlling the sex of their offspring. Most nests contain single sex broods. Research from Western Australia found that offspring emerging from nests had a male-bias early in the season (May-June), and a female-bias later in the season (July to August), which was related to a reduced floral resource later in the season. Male offspring also decreased in weight from the beginning to the end of the season. Most nests had 3 to 4 adults emerge. There is evidence of competition between the banksia bee and the European honey bee. Researchers have found that in areas of high honey bee density, banksia bees completed 23% less nests.

The brood of the banksia bee smells strongly of lemon myrtle, which might be an antifungal compound or an adaptation to deter brood parasitoids and predators. In spite of this, a single larva has been recorded having 90 small chalcid wasps emerge from it. Adult banksia bees have been found carrying mites (not Varroa mites).

=== Floral preferences ===
Banksia sphaerocarpa (fox banksia), a forage plant of the bees

Both sexes collect nectar, but only the females collect pollen. In most areas, particularly in Western Australia, the banksia bee is found on or near banksia flowers. It will visit a wider range of flowers in eastern Australia, where banksias do not flower all year round.

Banksia sphaerocarpa was found to be a particularly important pollen source in parts of Western Australia. The banksia bee has also been recorded visiting flowers of the following species and genera: Banksia menziesii, Banksia hookeriana, Banksia marginata, Banksia ornata, Banksia serrata, Banksia ashbyi, Banksia coccinea, Banksia ilicifolia, Banksia prionotes, Banksia sessilis, Banksia speciosa, Allocasuarina campestris, Grevillea cagiana, Grevillea eriostachya, Isopogon dubius, Lambertia formosa, Leptospermum, Angophora, Callistemon and Xanthorrhoea.
