= Cryptodiaporthe melanocraspeda =

Scientific classification
- Kingdom: Fungi
- Division: Ascomycota
- Class: Sordariomycetes
- Order: Diaporthales
- Family: Gnomoniaceae
- Genus: Cryptodiaporthe
- Species: C. melanocraspeda

Binomial name
- Cryptodiaporthe melanocraspeda Bathgate, M.E. Barr & B.L. Shearer

Species of fungus

Cryptodiaporthe melanocraspeda is a species of fungus that causes canker in, and has devastated stands of, the southwestern Australian wildflowers Banksia coccinea and B. baxteri. Dying stands of B. coccinea were observed in 1989, and the fungus isolated as the cause in 1995. The disease, a form of aerial canker, manifested initially as dead dry brown leaves and the tips of new growth. Plants would die from the top downwards, with larger branches affected over time. Under the outer bark, orange and brown patches of necrosis spread out from leaf nodes until they encircle the stem, which then dies. Flower spikes may be affected during flowering season. In humid spells during warm weather, white or pink spore tendrils are produced on dead wood. One affected stand monitored over three years from October 1989 to June 1992 showed a 97% mortality of plants (compared with a baseline 40%).
