= Prodromus Florae Novae Hollandiae et Insulae Van Diemen =

Book on flora of Australia

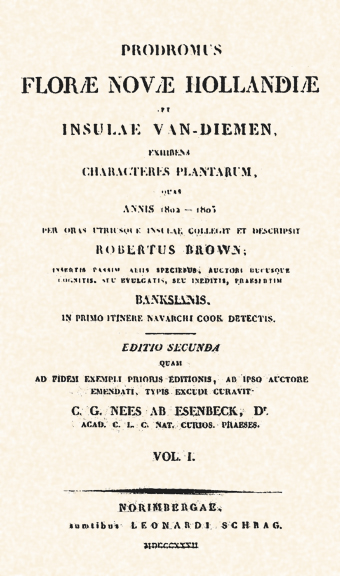

Prodromus Florae Novae Hollandiae et Insulae Van Diemen (Prodromus of the Flora of New Holland and Van Diemen's Land) is a book by the botanist Robert Brown published in 1810, which deals with the flora of Australia. Often referred to as Prodromus Flora Novae Hollandiae, or by its standard botanical abbreviation Prodr. Fl. Nov. Holland., it was the first attempt at a survey of the Australian flora. It described over 2040 species, over half of which were published for the first time.

Brown's Prodromus was originally published as Volume One, and following the Praemonenda (Preface), page numbering commences on page 145. Sales of the Prodromus were so poor, however, that Brown withdrew it from sale. Due to the commercial failure of the first volume, pages 1 to 144 were never issued, and Brown never produced the additional volumes that he had planned.

In 1813, a book of illustrations for the Prodromus was published separately by Ferdinand Bauer under the title Ferdinandi Bauer Illustrationes florae Novae Hollandiae sive icones generum quae in Prodromo florae Novae Hollandiae et Insulae Van Diemen descripsit Robertus Brown, usually referred to as Illustrationes Florae Novae Hollandiae. The Prodromus itself was eventually reprinted in 1819, and a slightly modified second edition released in 1821. In 1830, Brown published a short supplement to the Prodromus, entitled Supplementum Primum Prodromi Florae Novae Hollandiae.

== Abbreviations ==
The following explanations for Brown's abbreviations are given in his Praemonenda (pages v-viii)

1. (M.) refers to material collected along the southern coast of Australia, and "covers plants collected between Cape Leeuwin in WA to Wilson's Promontory in Victoria".
  Oram meridionalem, Novae Hollandiae, a Promontario Lewin ad Promontorium Wilson in Freto Bass, complectentum Lewin's Land, Nuyt's Land, et Littora orientem versus, NAVARCHO FLINDERS in expeditione cui adjunctus sui, primum explorata et paulo post a navigatoribus Gallicia visa: insulis adjentibus inclusis - "The southern coast of New Holland, from Cape Lewin to Cape Wilson in Bass Strait, comprising Lewin's Land, Nuyt's Land, and the coast eastward, ... including adjacent islands
2. (J.) to material collected within and around the colony of Port Jackson and from the Hunter River.
  Designat in vicinitate coloniae apud Portum Jackson, inclusis ripis estuarii Hunter's River vel Coal River nuncupati - "It designates the vicinity of the colony at Port Jackson, including the banks of the estuary called Hunter's River or Coal River."
3. (T.) to material collected during the journey of the Investigator from Port Jackson to Arnhem Bay (i.e., collections made between 21 July 1802 and 5 February 1803)
  Littora Novae Hollandiae intra tropicum, tam orientalia quam septentrionalia, quorum priora, praesertim in vicinitate Endeavour River, et Bay of Inlets, ab ILLUSTR. BANKS primàm explorata, nuper a Sandy Cape: ad insulas Cumberland Isles dictas, necnon septentriónalium Carpentaria et Arnhem's Land in expeditione suprà memoratà lustravi
4. (O.) The western coast of Australia from Cape Leeuwin to Wit's Land
  Oram occidentalem, a Promontorio Lewin ad Terram de Wit; cujus plantæ nonnullæ olim a Navarcho Dampier reportatæ fuere, et plurimæ procul dubio nuper a percgrinatoribus Gallicis, praesertim D. Lechenault et b, Riedley lectæ sunt. Haec litera autem rarissimé occurrit, non enim examini subjeci ullas hujus orae, unà alteráve Dampieri e€xceptá et paucissimis a b. Baudin cum b. King tunc Colonie prefecto et D. Paterson legionis tribuno in Novå Cambriá relictis, et. nunc vel in Herbario Banksiano vel proprio asservatis.
5. (D.) refers to material collected in Van Diemen's Land (Tasmania).
  Insulam Van Diemen, cujus regiones septentrionales et preecipué Australes visitavi... - Van Diemen's Island, whose northern and especially southern regions I have visited....
6. (v. v.) refers to plants seen living by Brown.
  Litere minores speciebus annexae plantas a me vel vivas in earum patriâ (v. v.) vel siccatas (v. s.)
7. (v. s.) refers to dried material, and means that Brown has only seen dried specimens. (see quote above)
