= Franz Bauer =

Austrian microscopist and botanical artist (1758–1840)

Franz Andreas Bauer
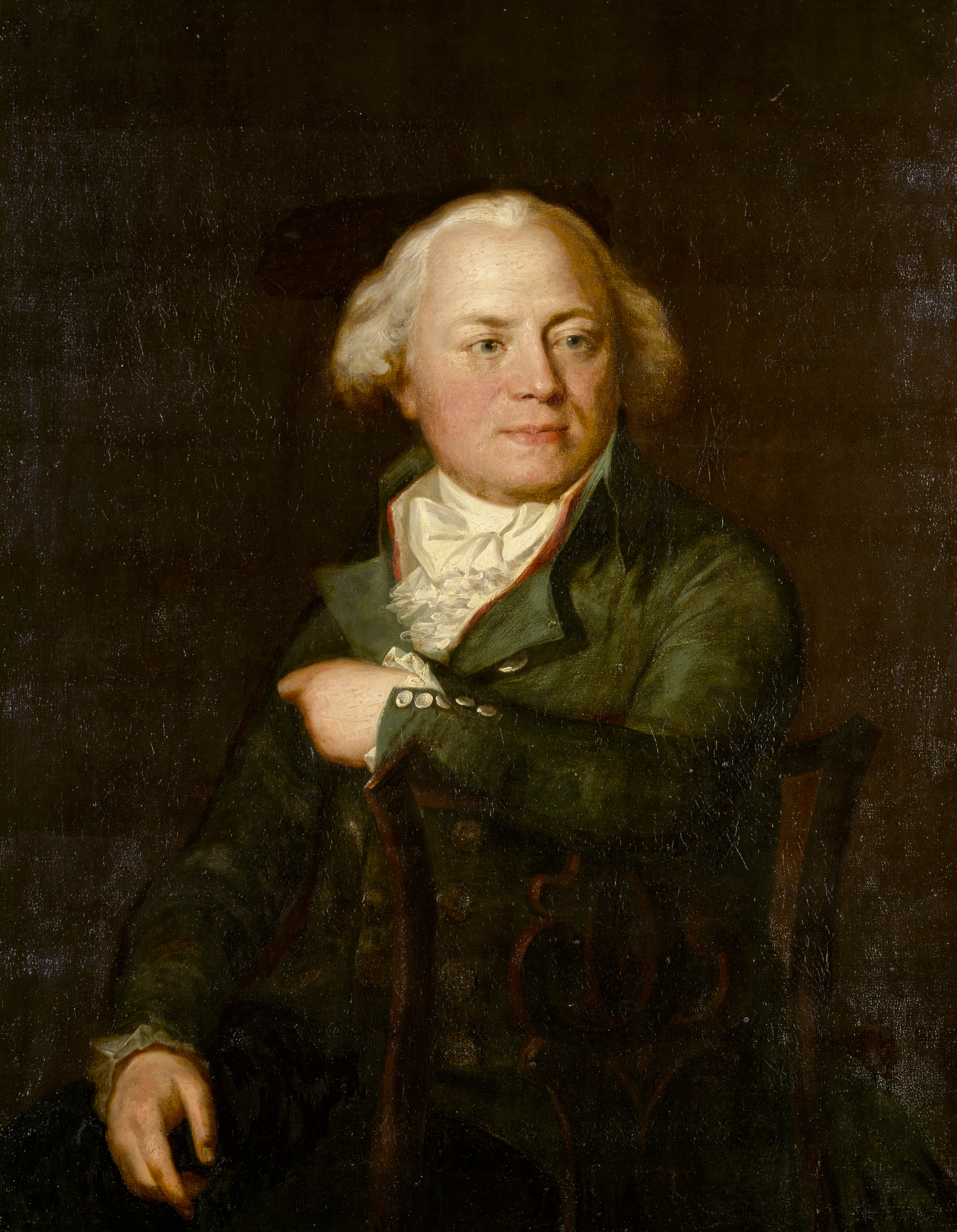
- Born: 14 March 1758; Feldsberg, Empire of Austria
- Died: 11 December 1840 (aged 82); Kew, England
- Education: Father Norbert Boccius
- Known for: Botanical illustrator
- Notable work: Delineations of Exotick Plants, Illustrations of Orchidaceous Plants, Strelitzia Depicta
- Patrons: King George III

Franz Andreas Bauer (later Francis) (14 March 1758 – 11 December 1840) was an Austrian microscopist and botanical artist. The standard author abbreviation F.A.Bauer is used to indicate this person as the author when citing a botanical name.

Born in Feldsberg, Lower Austria (now Valtice, Czech Republic), he was the son of Lucas Bauer (died 1761), court painter to the Prince of Liechtenstein, and brother of the painters Josef Anton (1756–1830) and Ferdinand Bauer (1760–1826). After Lucas Bauer's death, his wife, Therese continued to give her three sons lessons in art and illustration. Josef succeeded his father as court painter and eventually became keeper of the gallery in Vienna.

Francis and Ferdinand acquired their first experience of botanical illustration with the arrival of Father Norbert Boccius, Abbot of Feldsberg, in 1763, and produced over 2,000 watercolour drawings of plant specimens under his guidance. They were then employed by Count Dietrichstein as flower painters in Vienna - Franz illustrated works by the Baron Nikolaus Joseph von Jacquin and his son Baron Joseph Franz von Jacquin at the Schönbrunn Imperial Gardens; Franz then accompanied the latter to London. There Jacquin the younger introduced him to Sir Joseph Banks, who, recognizing his extraordinary talent, secured him a position as first botanical illustrator at the Royal Botanic Gardens, Kew and Museum, at an annual salary of £300. He stayed there for the rest of his life, producing a wealth of superb botanical and anatomical illustrations, became a member of the Royal Society and was appointed ‘Botanic Painter to His Majesty' King George III.

By 1790, Bauer had settled in at Kew, and was involved in detailed paintings and drawings of flower dissections, often at microscopic level, and taking great care in the hand-colouring of lithographic copies of his work. During this time he tutored Queen Charlotte, Princess Elizabeth and William Hooker in the art of illustration, and often entertained friends and botanists at his home. He died in 1840, and is buried at St. Anne's Church, Kew, next to Thomas Gainsborough. His legacy is to be found in such sumptuous publications as Delineations of Exotick Plants (1796–1803), his collaboration with John Lindley Illustrations of Orchidaceous Plants (1830–38), and his delicate lithographs in Strelitzia Depicta (1818).

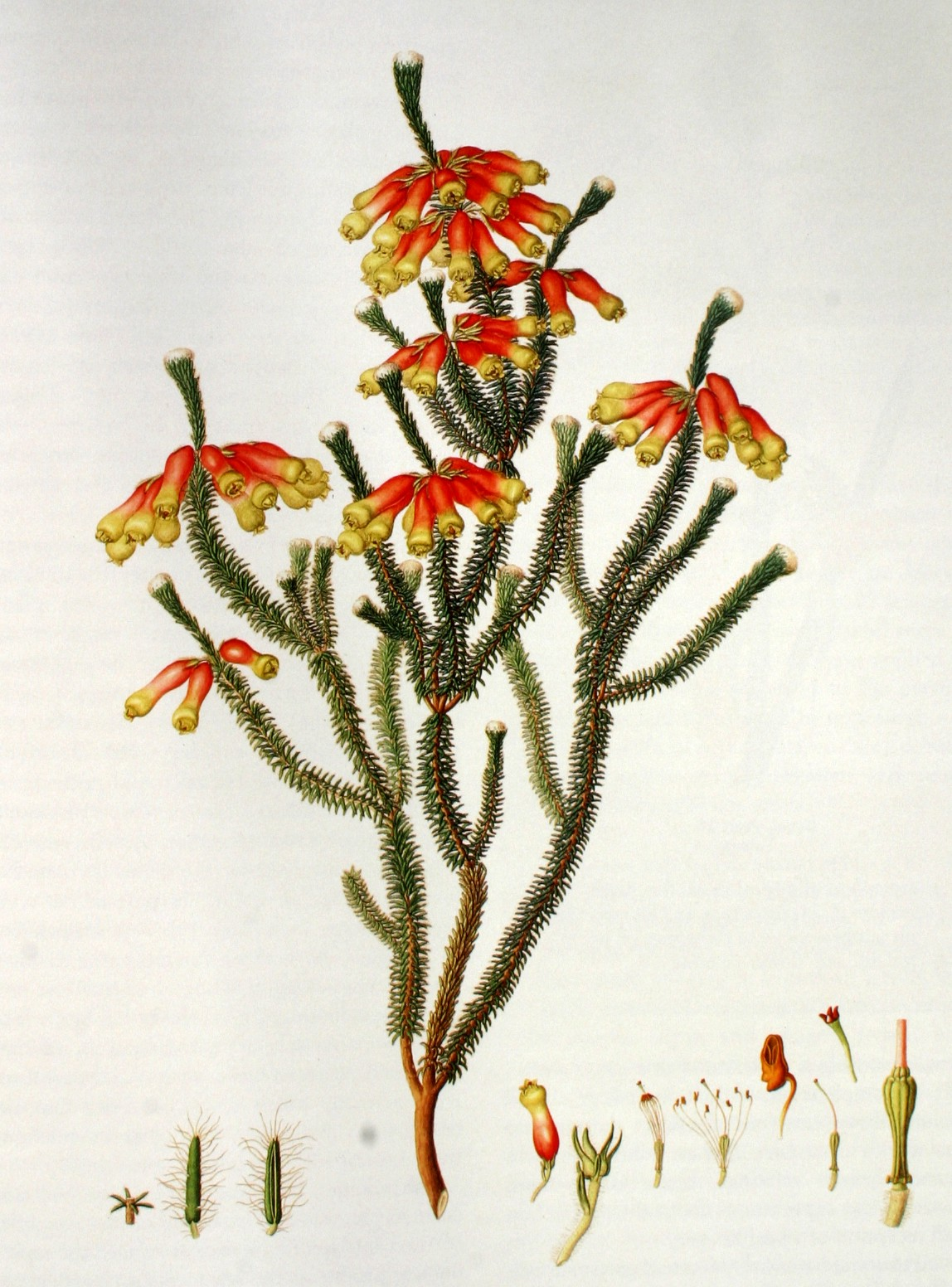
Erica massoni L.f.

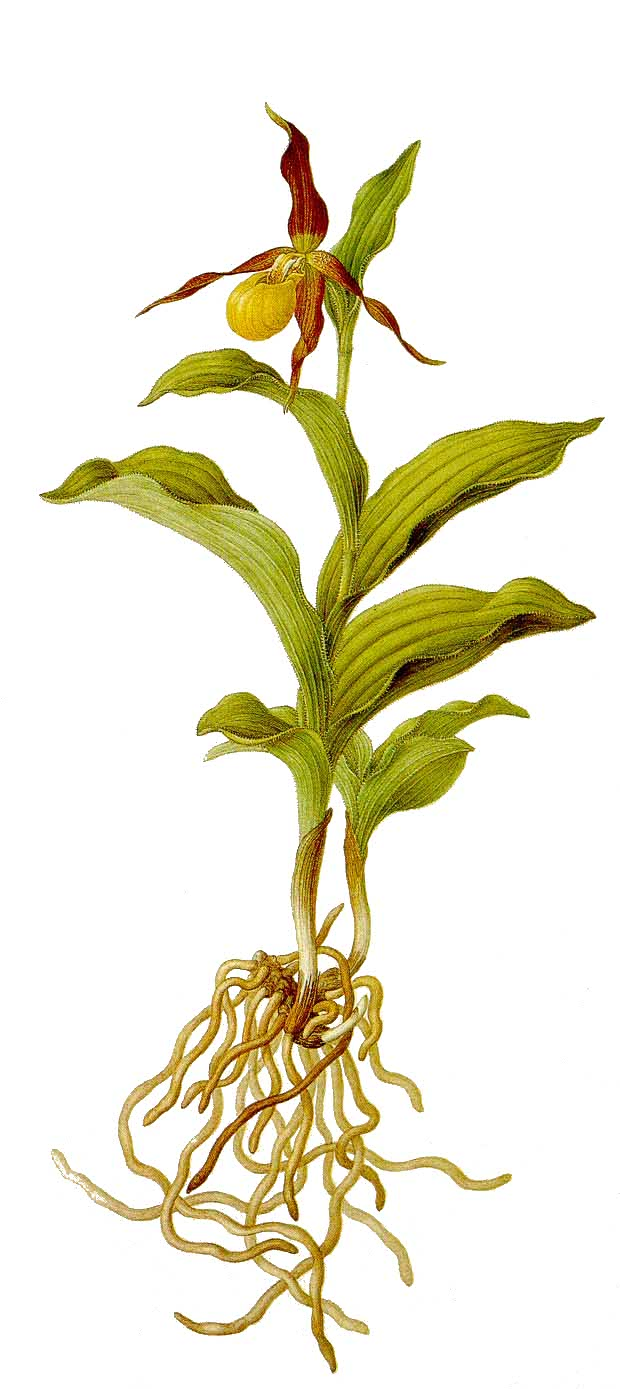
Cypripedium calceolus L.

== Works illustrated ==
- Delineations of Exotick Plants cultivated in the Royal Garden at Kew. Drawn and coloured and the Botanical characters displayed according to the Linnean System by Francis Bauer. Published by William Aiton, d.c. (Preface by Sir Joseph Banks.) 1796-83
- The Genera and Species of Orchidaceous Plants, illustrated by drawings on stone from the sketches of Francis Bauerby John Lindley. London, Ridgways and Treuttel, Wurtz, 1830-1838.
- Genera filicum; or Illustrations of the ferns, and other allied genera; from the original coloured drawings of the late Francis Bauer; with additions and descriptive letterpress, by Sir William Jackson Hooker. London, H. G. Bohn, 1842.

== Gallery ==
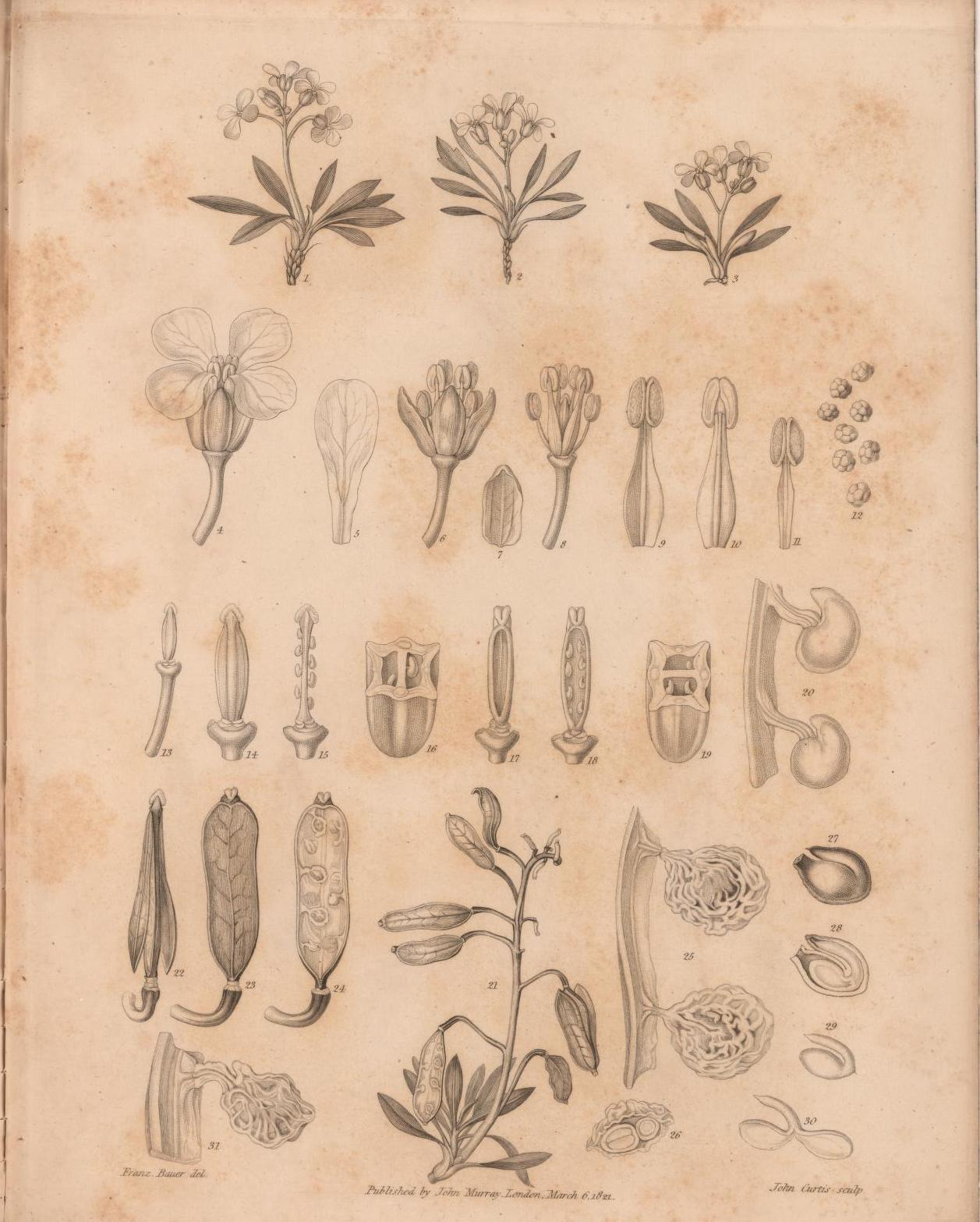

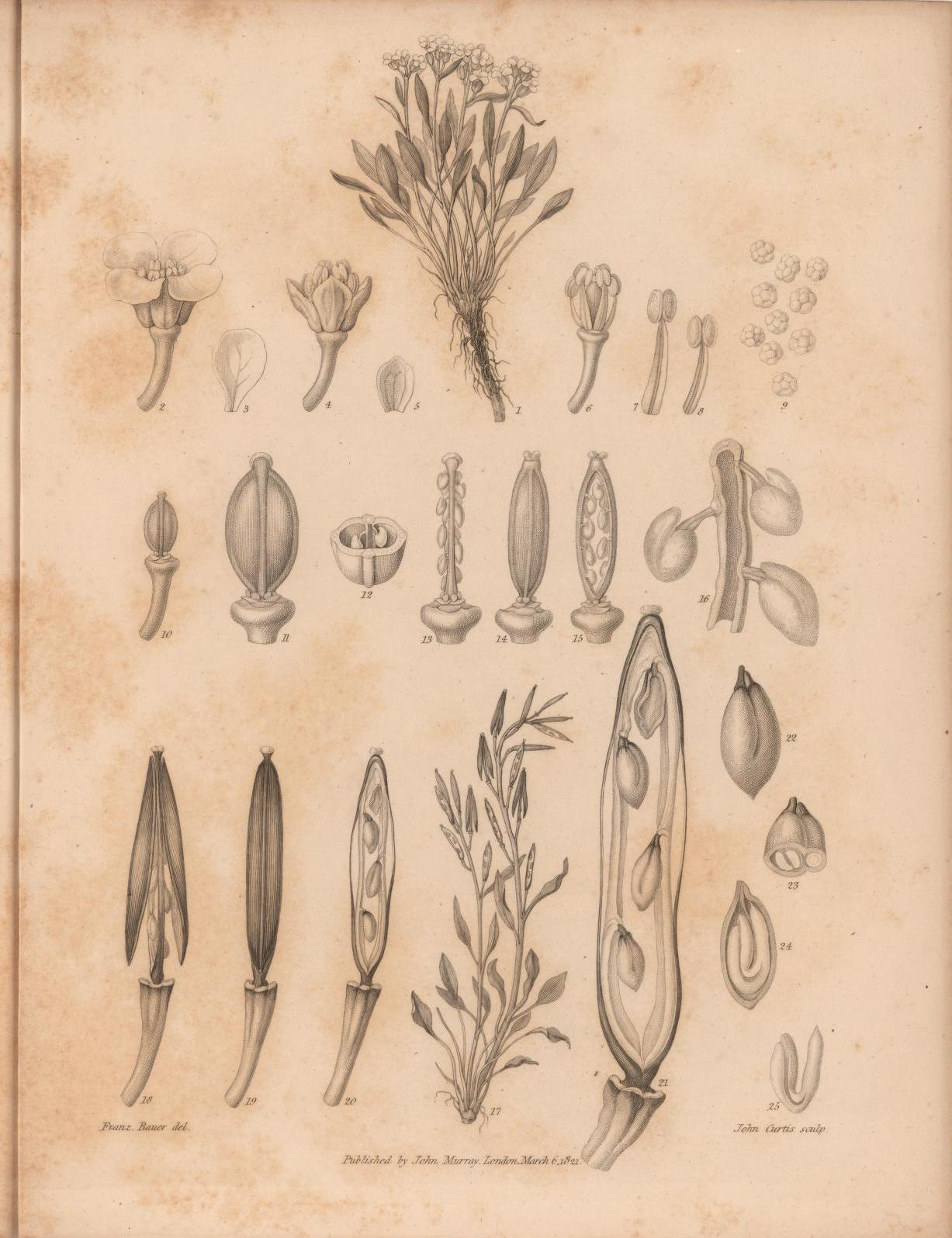

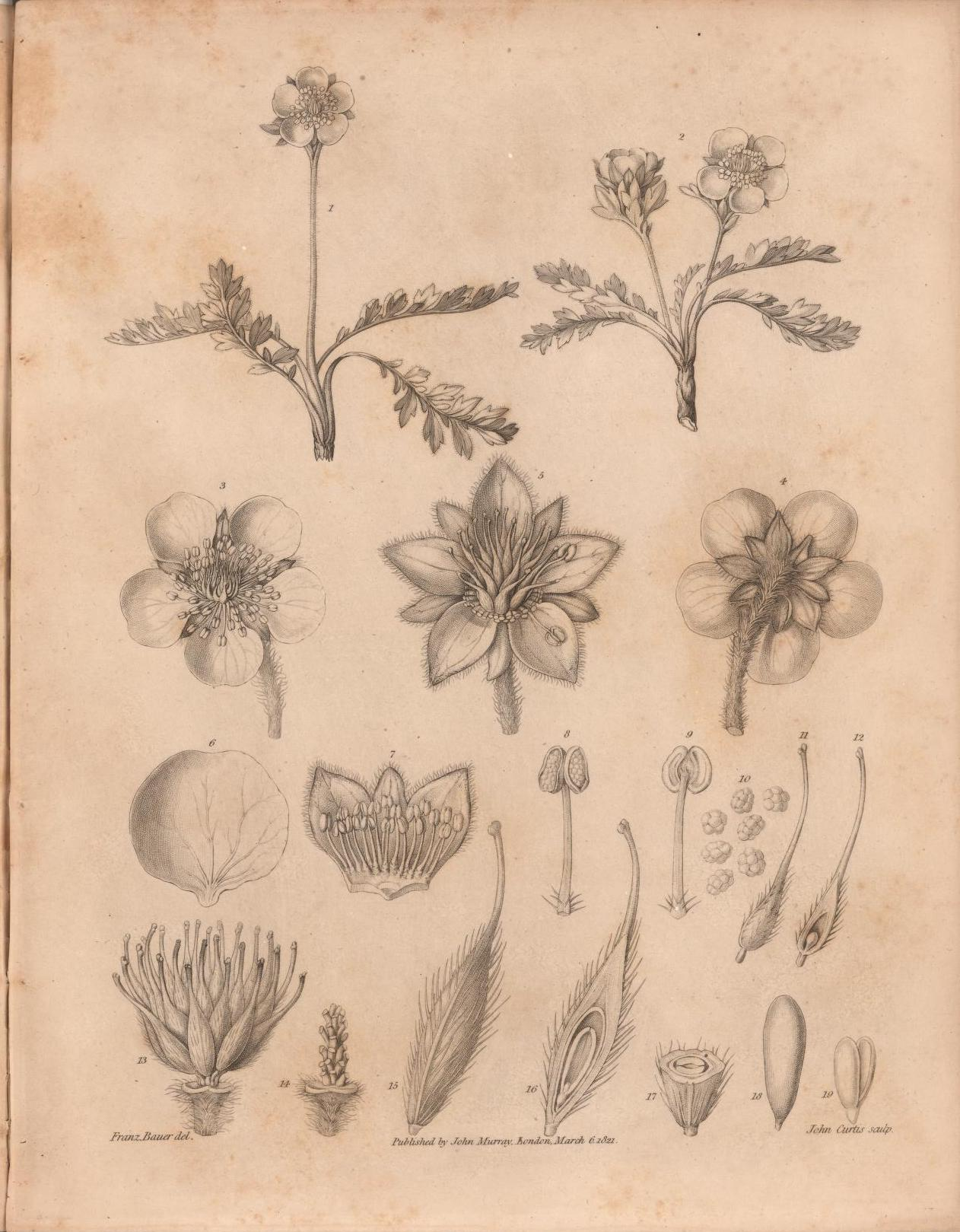

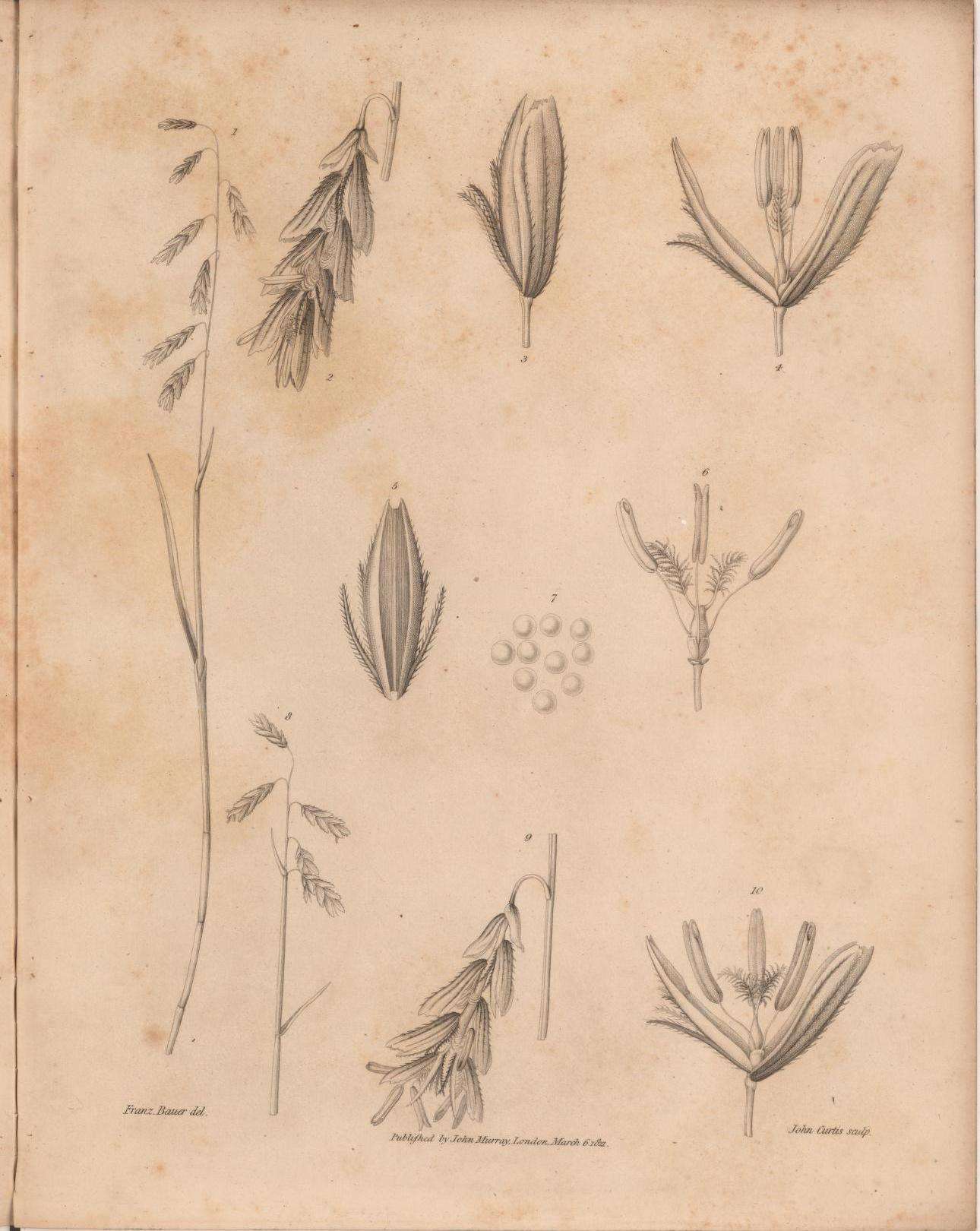

== Bibliography ==
- Stewart, Joyce and William T. Stearn. The orchid paintings of Franz Bauer. Timber Press,. Portland, Or. 1993 LCCN 93-241124 ISBN 0881922439
- Reinikka, Merle A. A History of the Orchid. Timber Press,. Portland, Or. 1995 LCCN 95-10784 ISBN 0881923257
