= Hofburg fire =

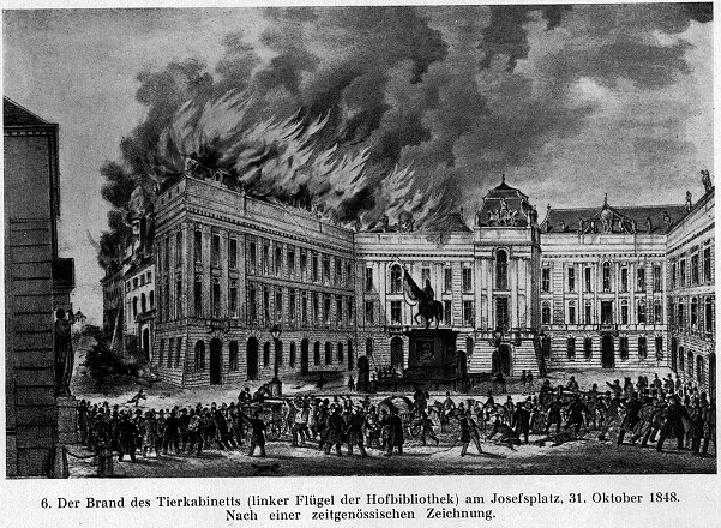
Hofburg fire of 1848, at the Hofburg Imperial Library on 31 October 1848

The term "Hofburg fire" refers to any of several major fires that burned in the Hofburg (Royal Court section) of Vienna, Austria. The Hofburg area has been the documented seat of government since 1279. Each fire destroyed different parts of the Hofburg, in different centuries, and can be termed the "Hofburg fire" due to the historical impact during a particular century:

- 23 February 1668 – during the fire, Emperor Leopold I was rescued; after the fire, restoration work was performed from 1668 to 1681, and an additional storey was added to the palace, according to plans by D. Carlone and P. Tencala.
- 31 October 1848 – a fire, which started during the Vienna Rebellion, later burned part of the Hofburg Hofbibliothek (Imperial Library), destroying museum collections and notes in the Zoology-Cabinet museum.
- 26 November 1992 – during the night of 26–27 November 1992, a large fire originated in the Hofburg in the area of the Redoutensäle on Joseph Square (Josefsplatz). A part of the roof as well as that of the upper floor burned completely down. The Spanische Hofreitschule and the Austrian National Library were in danger, too, but could be saved. The renovation was completed by 1997, and the newly rebuilt sections now contain wall and ceiling paintings by Josef Mikl.

There have been other fires in the Hofburg, also, during the past centuries.
