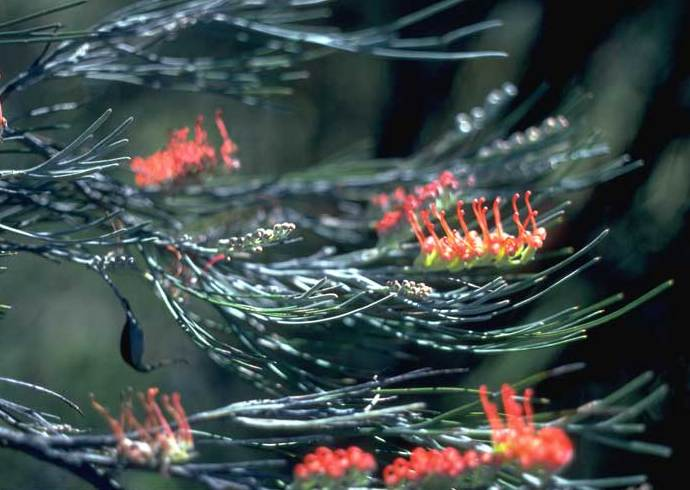
- Grevillea cagiana near Cunderdin

Conservation status
- Least Concern (IUCN 3.1)

Scientific classification
- Kingdom: Plantae
- Clade: Tracheophytes
- Clade: Angiosperms
- Clade: Eudicots
- Order: Proteales
- Family: Proteaceae
- Genus: Grevillea
- Species: G. cagiana

Binomial name
- Grevillea cagiana McGill.

= Grevillea cagiana =

Red toothbrushes

Species of shrub native to Western Australia

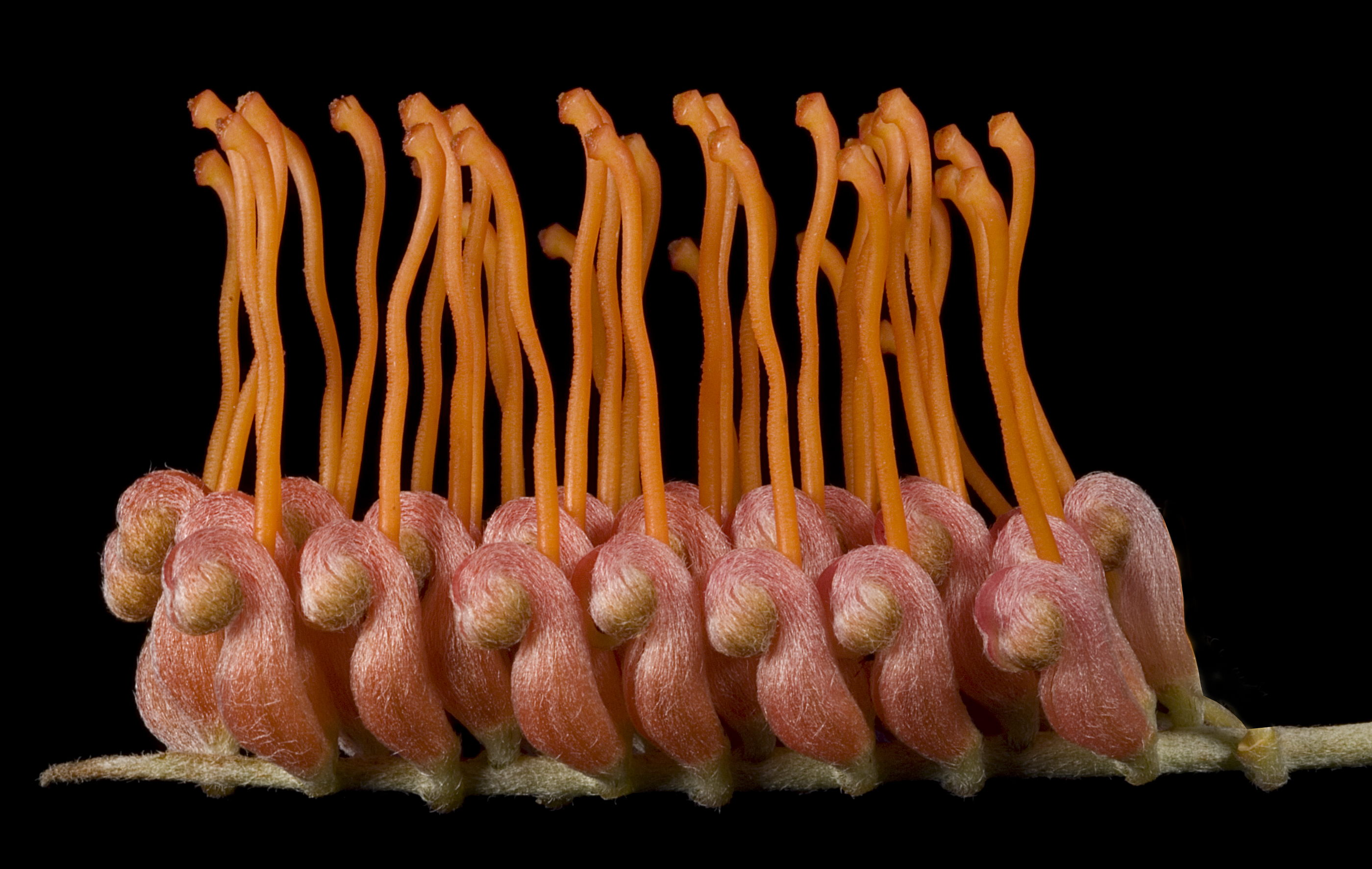
Flower detail

Grevillea cagiana, commonly known as red toothbrushes, is a species of flowering plant in the family Proteaceae and is endemic to the south-west of Western Australia. It is an erect or spreading shrub with simple or divided leaves with linear lobes, and green, yellow, orange or pink flowers with red styles.

== Description ==
Grevillea cagiana is an erect or spreading shrub that typically grows to a height of 0.8–6 m (2 ft 7 in – 19 ft 8 in). Its leaves are 50–160 mm (2.0–6.3 in) long and simple or divided with up to eleven erect, linear lobes 5–115 mm (0.20–4.53 in) long and 0.8–1.8 mm (0.031–0.071 in) wide with the edges rolled under, obscuring the lower surface. The flowers are arranged in toothbrush-like groups, the rachis 200–600 mm (7.9–23.6 in) long, the flowers green, yellow, orange or pink, the pistil mostly 16.5–21.5 mm (0.65–0.85 in) long and the style bright orange-red to red. Flowering occurs from June to March and the fruit is a silky-hairy follicle 15–29 mm (0.59–1.14 in) long.

== Taxonomy ==
Grevillea cagiana was first formally described in 1986 by Donald McGillivray in his book New Names in Grevillea (Proteaceae), based on specimens collected near Kukerin in 1976. The specific epithet (cagiana) honours Charles Austin Gardner, from his initials "C.A.G.".

== Distribution and habitat ==
This grevillea grows in heathland and shrubland between Merredin, Coolgardie and the Bremer Range in the Avon Wheatbelt, Coolgardie, Esperance Plains and Mallee biogeographic regions of south-western Western Australia.

== Conservation status ==
Grevillea cagiana is listed as not threatened by the Government of Western Australia Department of Biodiversity, Conservation and Attractions and as least concern on the IUCN Red List of Threatened Species. It has a very wide range, its population is currently stable and there are no known major threats to the species, either current or in the near future.

== See also ==
- Grevillea
- Proteaceae
- Flora of Western Australia
- Endemism
