= Illustrationes Florae Novae Hollandiae =

1813 publication by Ferdinand Bauer

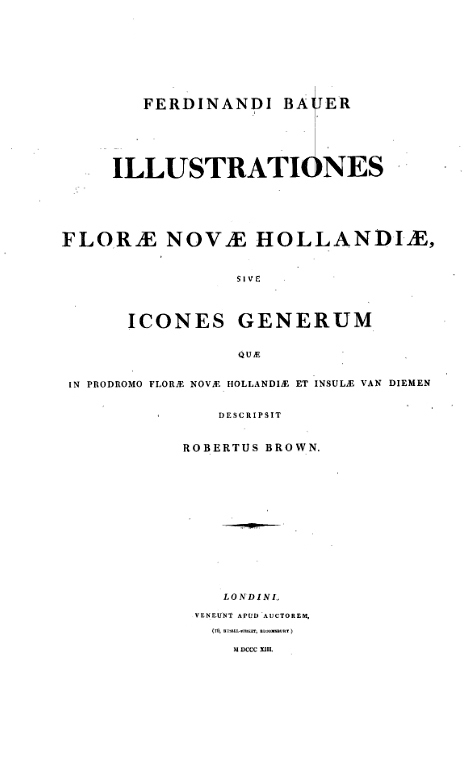
Frontispiece

Illustrationes florae Novae Hollandiae is an 1813 publication by the botanical illustrator Ferdinand Bauer.

Bauer was scientific illustrator on board HMS Investigator during Matthew Flinders' exploration of Australia, and as such he worked closely with the expedition's naturalist, Robert Brown. When these men returned to England in 1805, they brought with them thousands of specimens and hundreds of sketches. Initially, they planned to publish a large-scale work, to be entitled Illustrationes florae Novae Hollandiae, but this venture failed, and Brown decided to publish his scientific descriptions separately, in Transactions of the Linnean Society of London, and later his own Prodromus Florae Novae Hollandiae et Insulae Van Diemen. Bauer then undertook to publish a lesser work himself, with Brown providing text limited to a brief preface and some captioning.

Unusually, Bauer not only did all the illustrations, but also engraved the printing plates and hand-coloured the illustrations. It was exceedingly unusual for a single artist to perform all three roles; it is said that Bauer did the engraving himself because he could not find a good engraver, and previous works of his were disappointing because of incompetent engraving.

Three issues of Illustrationes florae Novae Hollandiae were published, all in 1813. These three issues totalled fifteen plates, and a sixteenth was bound into some copies. Publication then ceased, probably because the venture was a financial failure. It is estimated that less than fifty copies of the work were sold, and some of these were uncoloured. It is therefore now an extremely rare book. In 1997, a copy was sold at Christie's for $57,000.

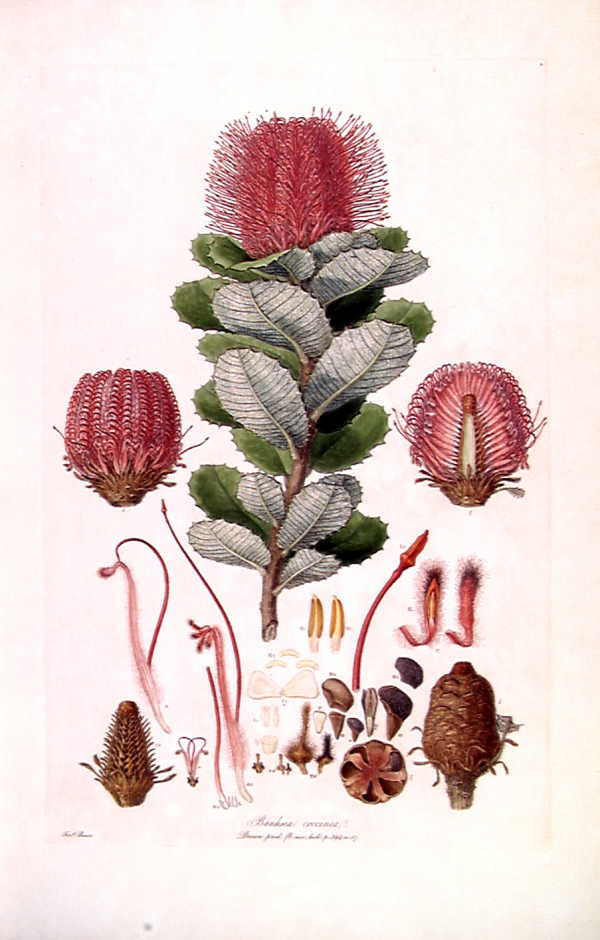
Plate III: Banksia coccinea
