= Adalbert Schnizlein =

German botanist and pharmacist

- Born: 15 April 1814; Feuchtwangen
- Died: 24 October 1868 (aged 54); Erlangen
- Other name: Adalbert Carl Friedrich Hellwig Conrad Schnizlein
- Education: University of Erlangen
- Scientific career
- Fields: Plant taxonomy, phytogeography
- Workplaces: University of Erlangen
- Author abbrev. (botany): Schnizl.

Adalbert Carl Friedrich Hellwig Conrad Schnizlein (15 April 1814, Feuchtwangen – 24 October 1868, Erlangen) was a German botanist and pharmacist. He is largely remembered for his work in the fields of plant taxonomy and phytogeography.

== Background ==
He received training in pharmacy at Ansbach, afterwards becoming an assistant pharmacist in Nördlingen (1833). He later studied pharmacy at the Ludwig-Maximilians-Universität München, earning his doctorate at the University of Erlangen in 1836. In 1845, he was habilitated in botany at Erlangen, where in 1850 he became an associate professor of botany and director of the botanical garden.

== Contributions ==
His most extensive work, "Iconographia familiarum naturalium regni vegetabilis" (1843–1870), was issued in four volumes. A taxonomic representation of the plant kingdom, it contained 399 copper plates, and in its time, was considered to be a major work in systematics. Another significant effort by Schnizlein was a treatise on Bavarian flora, titled "Die Flora Von Bayern" (1847). He also made contributions to Carl Friedrich Philipp von Martius' "Flora Brasiliensis", to Theodor Friedrich Ludwig Nees von Esenbeck's "Genera plantarum florae germanicae" and to Jacob Sturm's "Deutschlands Flora in Abbildungen".
