= Ferdinand Bauer =

Austrian botanical illustrator

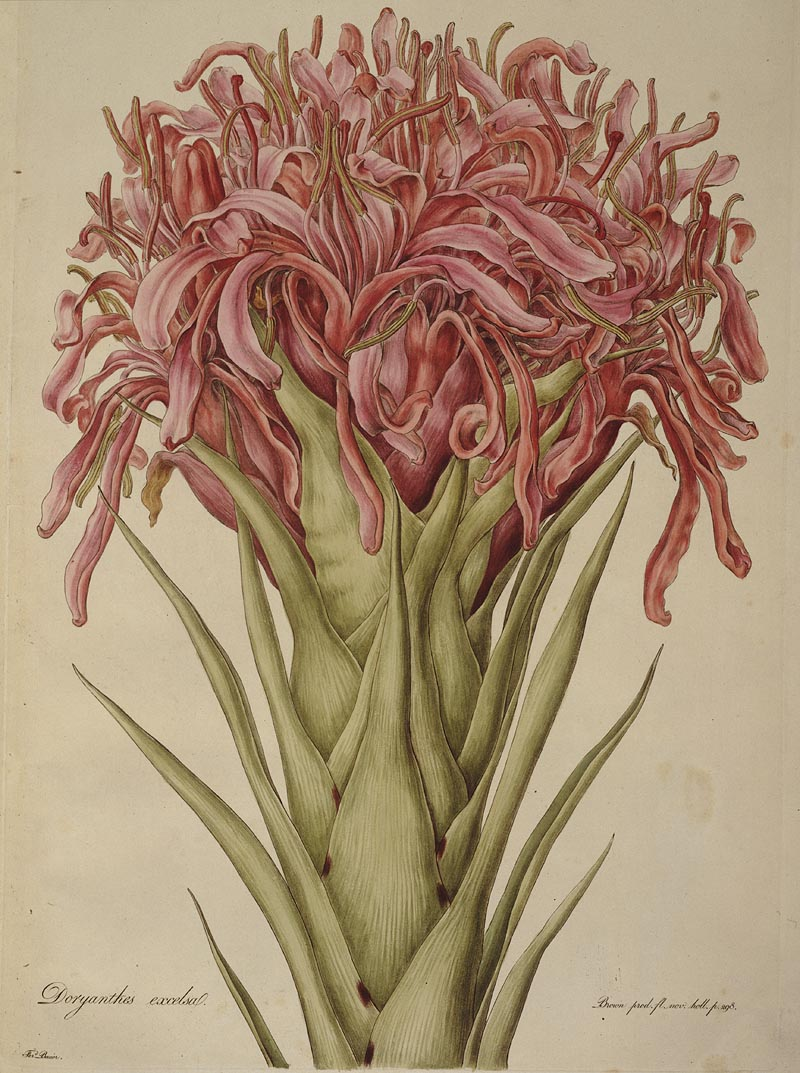
Doryanthes excelsa

Ferdinand Lucas Bauer (20 January 1760 – 17 March 1826) was an Austrian botanical illustrator who travelled on Matthew Flinders' expedition to Australia.

== Biography ==
=== Early life and career ===
Bauer was born in Feldsberg, Moravia, Habsburg monarchy (now Valtice, Czech Republic) in 1760, the youngest son of Lucas Bauer (?–1761) – court painter to the Prince of Liechtenstein – but was left fatherless in his first year of life. The eldest son was the successor to their father's position. Together with two of his brothers, Joseph Anton and Franz Andreas, he was placed in the custody of Norbert Boccius (1729–1806), a physician and botanist who was Prior of the monastery at Feldsberg. Under the guidance of Boccius, Bauer became an astute observer of nature and was just 15 when he began to contribute miniature drawings to Boccius' collection. In 1780, Franz and Ferdinand were sent to Vienna to work under the direction of Nikolaus von Jacquin, an eminent botanist and Director of the Royal Botanical Garden at Schönbrunn Palace. There, Bauer was introduced to the Linnean taxonomic system, the field of microscopy, and took lessons in landscape painting.

In mid-1786, on the recommendation of Jacquin, Bauer accompanied the Oxford Professor John Sibthorp as an artist on a field trip to Greece and Asia Minor. They returned to England in December 1787 with over 1,500 sketches of plants, animals, birds and landscapes, some of which appeared in Flora Graeca. The Latin introduction to this work states "Sibthorp took with him a painter of excellent reputation, Ferdinand Bauer, whose merits our illustrations demonstrate." Joseph Hooker called Flora Graeca, with its 966 superbly hand-coloured illustrations, "the greatest botanical work that has ever appeared".

=== Australia ===
Bauer later travelled to Australia with Matthew Flinders as botanical draughtsman. He was one of six scientists selected by Joseph Banks to accompany Flinders on his circumnavigation of Australia. He worked under the direction of botanist Robert Brown, and in addition to botany, Bauer was to draw zoological subjects. His exacting standard of work earned him the admiration of both Matthew Flinders and Robert Brown. In a letter to Banks from Port Jackson, dated 20 May 1802, Flinders offered this praise: "It is fortunate for science that two men [Mr. Brown and Mr. Bauer] of such assiduity and abilities have been selected; their application is beyond what I have been accustomed to see."

Bauer, intent on capturing accurately the tone and shading of his specimens, but unable to carry with him the range of colours needed, covered his preliminary sketches with colour numbers. Banks was intrigued by Bauer's precision, and in January 1806 wrote that they "were prepared in such a manner by reference to a table of colours as to enable him to finish them at his leisure with perfect accuracy". A 2017 book contains reproductions of collections in Europe, the United Kingdom and Australia that have never before been published and reveals Bauer's innovative colour-coding technique for the first time.

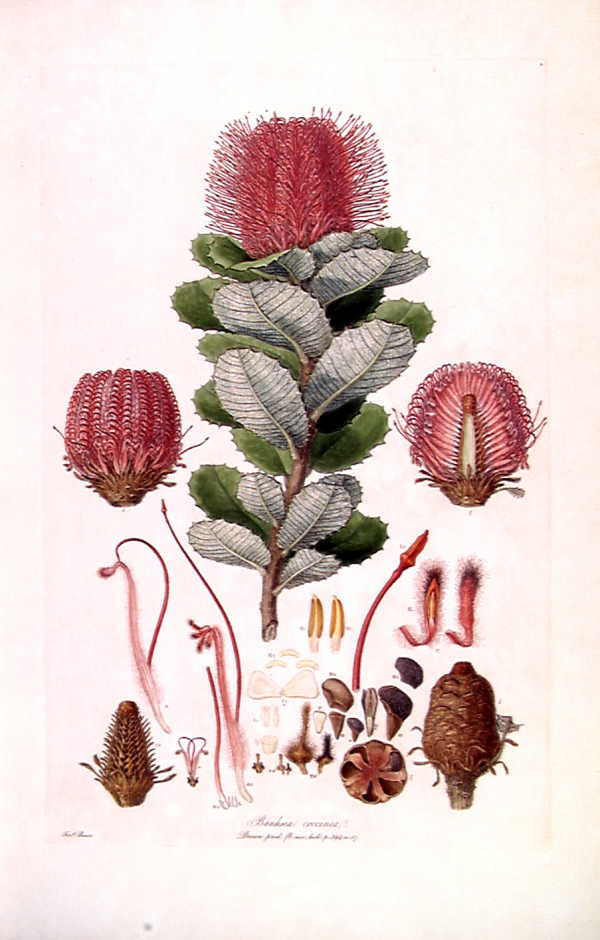
Banksia coccinea, plate 3 from Illustrationes Florae Novae Hollandiae

In June 1803, while Flinders returned to England in order to obtain a replacement for HMS Investigator, Bauer remained in Australia. He went to Norfolk Island for eight months and also undertook excursions to Newcastle, the Blue Mountains and the south coast of New South Wales. Bauer returned to England on Investigator, accompanied by 11 cases of drawings containing 1,542 Australian plants, 180 Norfolk Island plants, and over 300 animals.

=== Return to Europe ===
After Bauer's return to England on 13 October 1805, the Admiralty continued to employ Bauer to allow him to publish an account of his travels. Bauer worked on the Illustrationes Florae Novae Hollandiae for five years, doing all the engraving himself. He also contributed ten plates to Flinders' Voyage to Terra Australis.

From 1806 to 1813, 50 sets of Bauer's Illustrationes were published in three parts. Unfortunately, the publishing venture was a failure, and in August 1814 Bauer returned to Vienna, but continued to work for English publications including Lambert's Pinus and Lindley's Digitalis. He acquired a small house in Hietzing near the Schönbrunn Botanical Garden and spent his time painting and making excursions into the Austrian Alps until shortly before his death from dropsy on 17 March 1826.

The bulk of Bauer's finished paintings was acquired by the British Admiralty. In 1843 they were transferred to the British Museum together with additional paintings that Robert Brown had bought from Franz Bauer. Most of the sketches, as well as the herbarium and a collection of skins, were acquired by the Austrian Imperial Museum and are now housed in the Natural History Museum in Vienna.

Whereas Bauer's brother, Franz, is remembered both by a portrait and a memorial in Kew, Ferdinand Bauer himself has no portrait or stone to commemorate him other than a mention in Franz's epitaph in St Anne's Chapel in Kew: "In the delineation of plants he [Franz] united the accuracy of a profound naturalist with the skill of the accomplished artist, to a degree which has been only equalled by his brother Ferdinand."

=== Legacy ===
Bauer's biographer, John Lhotsky, whose purpose in writing Bauer's biography was to revive interest in the man and his work, suggested in 1843 that Bauer's name would "long live in the recollections of posterity" because of his drawings, the genus Bauera that was named after him, and Cape Bauer in South Australia, named by Flinders. But soon after his death, although acclaimed by his contemporaries as the greatest of botanical artists, Bauer's name was almost forgotten. He was single-minded and obsessional about his work and had no time or talent for self-promotion, which may go some way to explaining his long years in the historical wilderness.

Lhotsky did revive Bauer's name, but his brief biography remained the only source of information about the naturalist-painter for the next 100 years. Bauer's gained some prominence in the 1970s with the work of William Stearn and Wilfrid Blunt in their publication The Australian Flower Paintings of Ferdinand Bauer. The 1988 Bicentenary brought original Bauer paintings to Australia for the first time, where they were shown in three exhibitions, including "First Impressions" shown at the Australian Museum. In April 1989 the first monograph about Ferdinand Bauer's Australian voyage appeared, Ferdinand Bauer: the Australian Natural History Drawings. Drawing on both the English and Austrian collections, it also reproduced all of Bauer's known letters in translation. In 1985, 100 uncatalogued animal sketches by Bauer were found in Vienna, and some of them were included in the monograph.

Bauer's sketched the flora and fauna of the Australian coast and Norfolk Island, and left behind a wonderful visual record. In an essay on flower painting written in 1817, Johann Goethe devoted two pages to an analysis of one of Bauer's drawings: "we are enchanted at the sight of these leaves: nature is revealed, art concealed, great in its precision, gentle in its execution, decisive and satisfying in its appearance". His work has lasting important because of his craftsmanship, aesthetic sense and scientific accuracy.

Many of Bauer's watercolours are in the Sherardian Library of Plant Taxonomy at the University of Oxford, which has also digitised his botanical work Flora Graeca.

This botanist is denoted by the author abbreviation F.L.Bauer when citing a botanical name.

== See also ==
- List of Australian botanical illustrators
- List of Austrian artists and architects
- European and American voyages of scientific exploration
