= List of American botanical illustrators =

This is a list of notable botanical illustrators and flower painters born in or citizens of the United States of America.

Botanical illustrators paint or draw plants and sometimes their natural environment as well, forming a lineage where art and science meet. Some prefer to paint isolated specimen flowers while others prefer arrangements. Many botanical artists through the centuries have been active in collecting and cataloguing new species and/or in breeding plants. Some artists listed here worked primarily on botanical art, while others made it part of a wider artistic practice or illustrated books with their artwork.

- Margaret Neilson Armstrong
- Mary Daisy Arnold
- Clarissa Munger Badger
- William Paul Crillon Barton
- Olivia Marie Braida-Chiusano
- Margaret Warriner Buck
- Edith Clements
- Esther Heins
- Laura Coombs Hills
- Alfred Hoffy
- Louis Charles Christopher Krieger
- Dorothy van Dyke Leake
- Elsie E. Lower
- Bessie Niemeyer Marshall
- Joseph Mason
- Charles Frederick Millspaugh
- Amanda Newton
- Deborah Griscom Passmore
- William Henry Prestele
- Ellen Robbins
- Marion Satterlee
- Ellen Isham Schutt
- Elsie Louise Shaw
- J. Marion Shull
- Susie Barstow Skelding
- Royal Charles Steadman
- Alice Tangerini
- Anna Heyward Taylor
- Emma Homan Thayer
- Una Leonora Weatherby
- Anne Kingsbury Wollstonecraft

== See also ==
- List of Australian botanical illustrators
- List of Irish botanical illustrators
