= Mary Arnold =

Mary Arnold may refer to:

- Mary Arnold (tennis) (1916–1975), American tennis player
- Mary Anne Arnold (c. 1825–?), English sailor and crossdresser
- Mary Arnold (singer) (born 1947), American singer
- Mary Daisy Arnold (1873–1955), American botanical artist
- Mary Ellicott Arnold (1876–1968), American social activist, teacher and writer
- Mary Peterson Arnold (1885–1973), American politician
- Mary Augusta Ward (née Arnold; 1851–1920), British writer
