= Pomological Watercolor Collection =

United States Department of Agriculture illustration collection

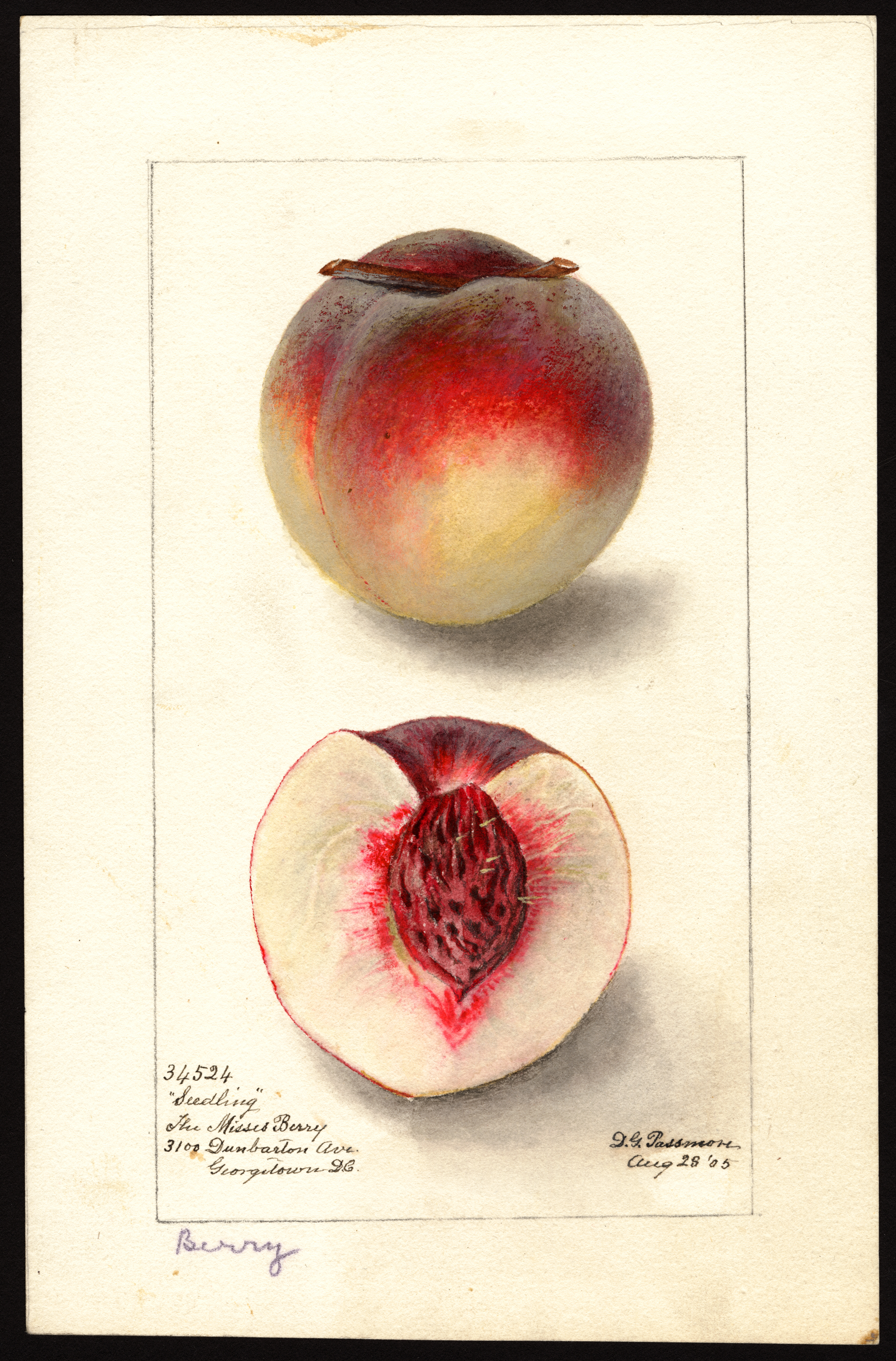
Watercolor by Deborah Griscom Passmore of Berry variety of peach (Prunus persica), 1905.

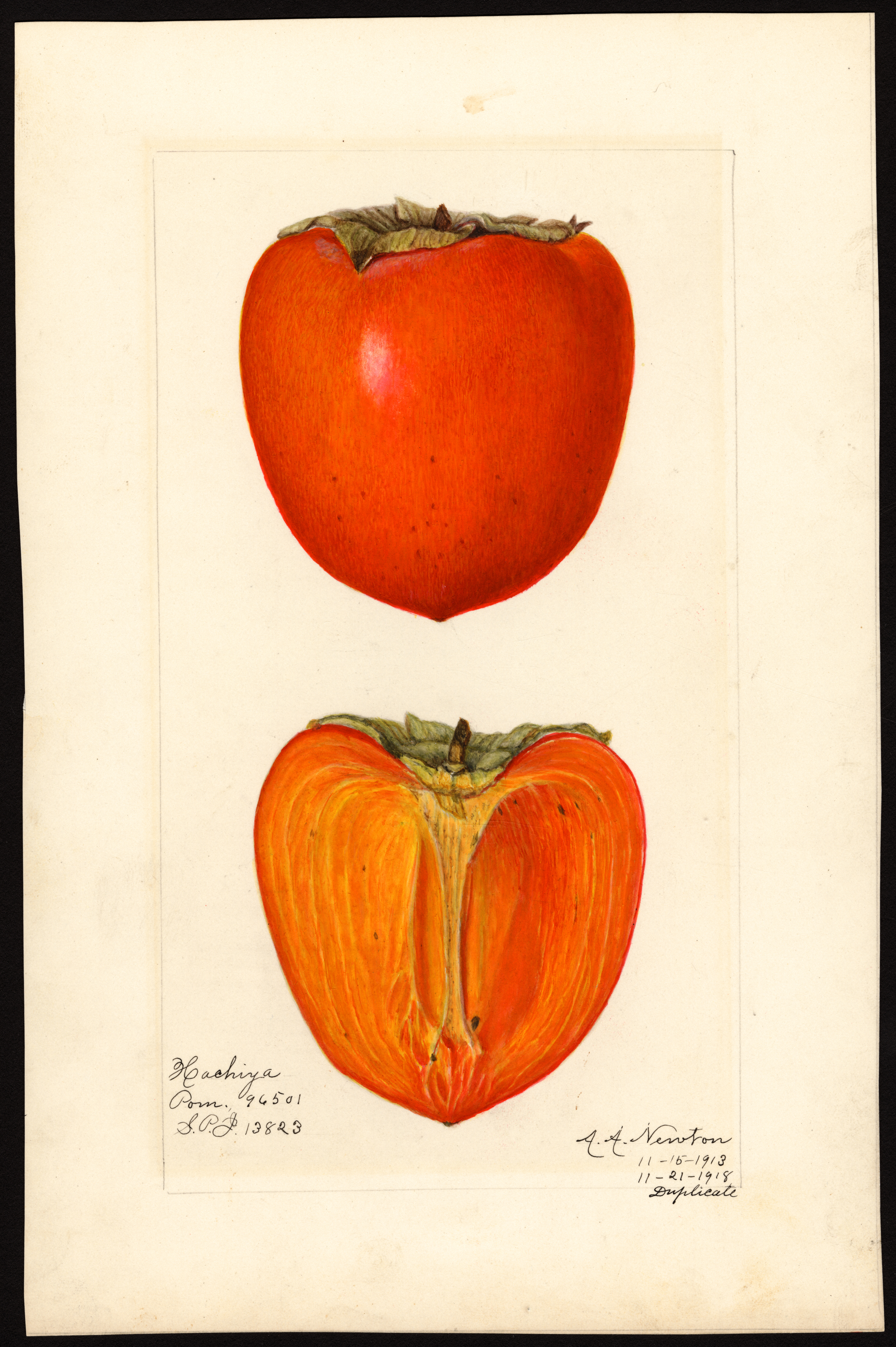
Watercolor by Amanda Newton of Japanese persimmon (variety Hachiya), 1915.

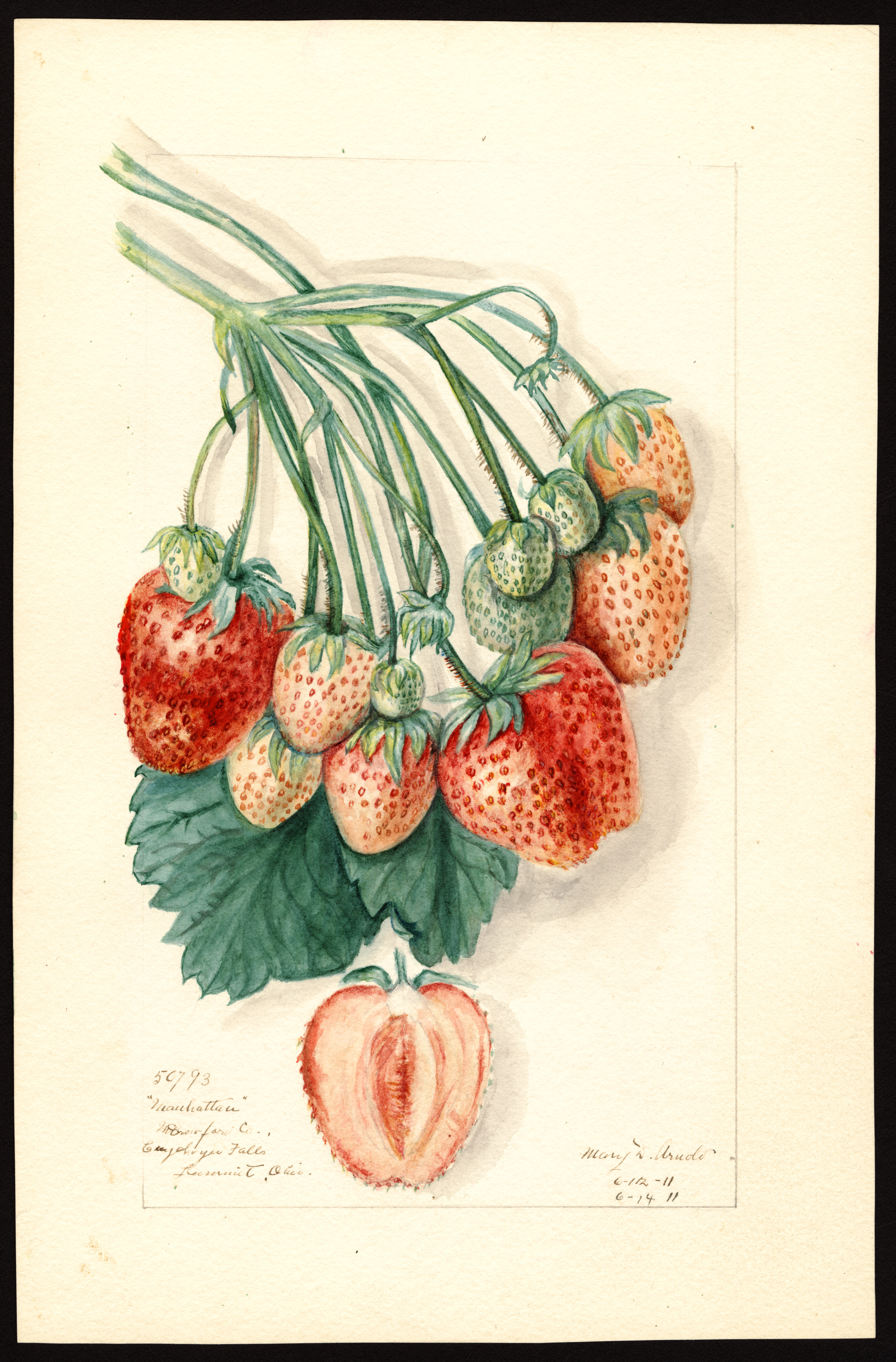
Watercolor by Mary Daisy Arnold of the Manhattan variety of strawberries (Fragaria species), 1911.

The U.S. Department of Agriculture's Pomological Watercolor Collection is an archive of some 7,500 watercolor botanical illustrations created for the USDA between the years 1886 and 1942 by around five dozen artists. Housed by the United States National Agricultural Library, it is a unique resource documenting existing fruit and nut cultivars, new introductions, and specimens discovered by USDA's plant explorers, representing 38 plant families in all. It has been called "one of the world's most unusual holdings of late 19th and early 20th century American botanical illustrations".

The archive spans the years in which American agriculture greatly expanded the range of fruits and vegetables grown on a commercial scale and developed many new cultivars. The USDA artists created the watercolors in an effort to catalog these cultivars—many of which went under different names in different regions of the United States—and to show the damage resulting from typical diseases and pests of specific fruits. During this period, many of the watercolors were issued as lithographic illustrations in USDA bulletins and the department's annual yearbooks.

== History of the collection ==
The period between 1886 and 1916—when most of these watercolors were painted—was a time when the major fruit-producing regions in the United States were just beginning to emerge, as farmers worked with the USDA to establish orchards for expanding markets. Photography was not yet in widespread use as a documentary medium, so the government relied on artists to produce technically accurate drawings of cultivars for its publications.

Some 65 different artists are represented in the collection, of whom one-third were women; working as a government illustrator was one of the few artists' jobs open to women at a time when they were just beginning to be able to gain formal training in American art schools. All but a handful of the collection's 7584 watercolors were created by just nine of the artists, of whom six were women. The top three contributors were Deborah Griscom Passmore, Amanda Almira Newton, and Mary Daisy Arnold, who each painted over 1000 watercolors and between them are responsible for half the collection. Passmore's watercolors in particular have been called the finest done by the early USDA illustrators and a national treasure. Among the other most prolific artists were Royal Charles Steadman (over 850 watercolors), J. Marion Shull (who later became a noted plant breeder; over 750 watercolors), Ellen Isham Schutt (over 700), Bertha Heiges (over 600), Elsie E. Lower (over 250), William Henry Prestele (over 100), and the noted mycologist Louis Charles Christopher Krieger. Another artist whose work is included in the collection is Roberta Cowing.

Slightly over half of the watercolors show apple cultivars, a good many of which are no longer cultivated. The remainder range from common types of fruits and nuts (grapes, berries, stone fruit, melons, citrus, walnuts, hickory nuts) to lesser-known native fruits (Eastern shadbush) and species newly introduced in the United States or not yet grown there: cherimoya, avocado, natal plum, sweetsop, etc. The specimens depicted were collected throughout the United States and its territories and in nearly 30 other countries as well. The typical watercolor in the collection depicts the whole fruit (sometimes with its leaves) together with a half-view showing its flesh and seeds; some show the fruit in a diseased state.

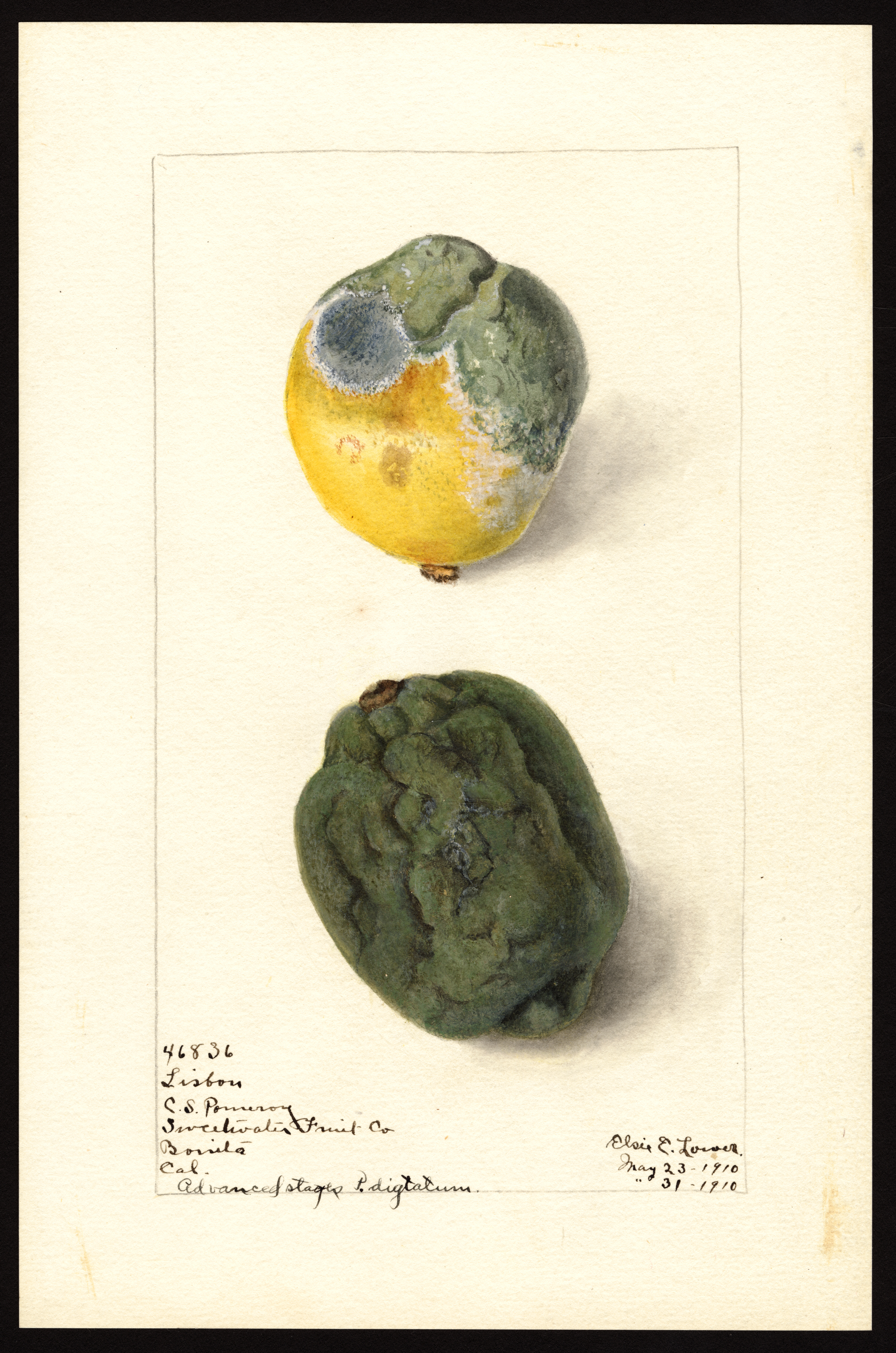
Watercolor by Elsie E. Lower of diseased Lisbon lemon (Citrus limon), 1910.

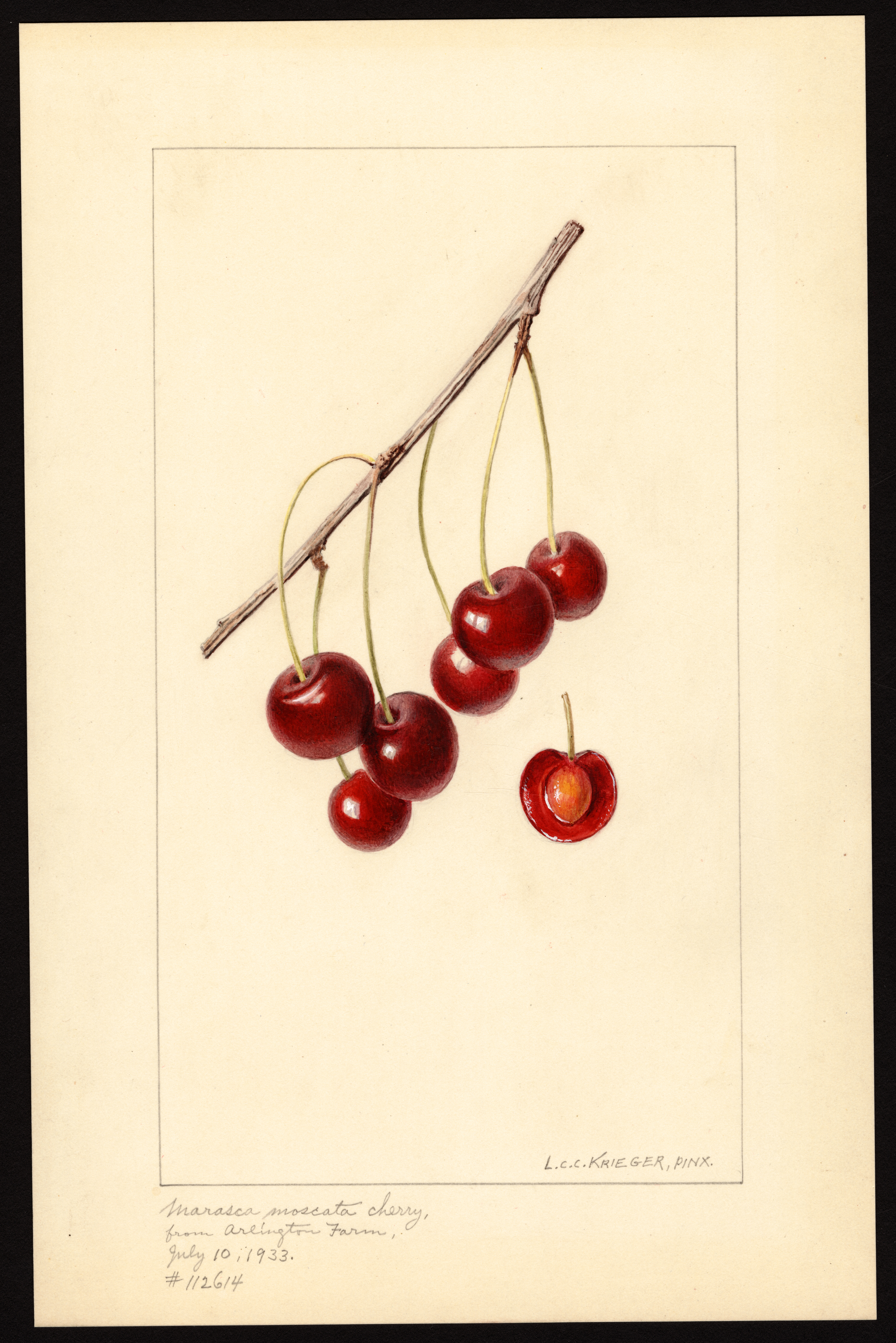
Watercolor by Louis Charles Christopher Krieger of Marasca Moscata variety of cherry (Prunus avium), 1933.

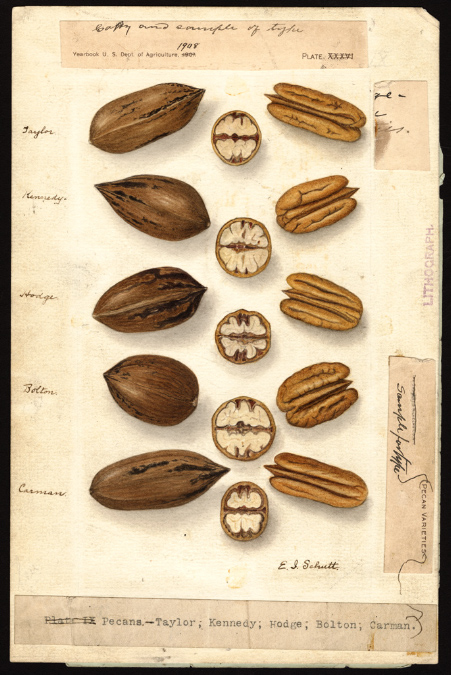
Watercolor by Ellen Isham Schutt of pecans (Carya illinoinensis), ca. 1904–14. Varieties shown include Taylor, Kennedy, Hodge, Bolton, and Carman.

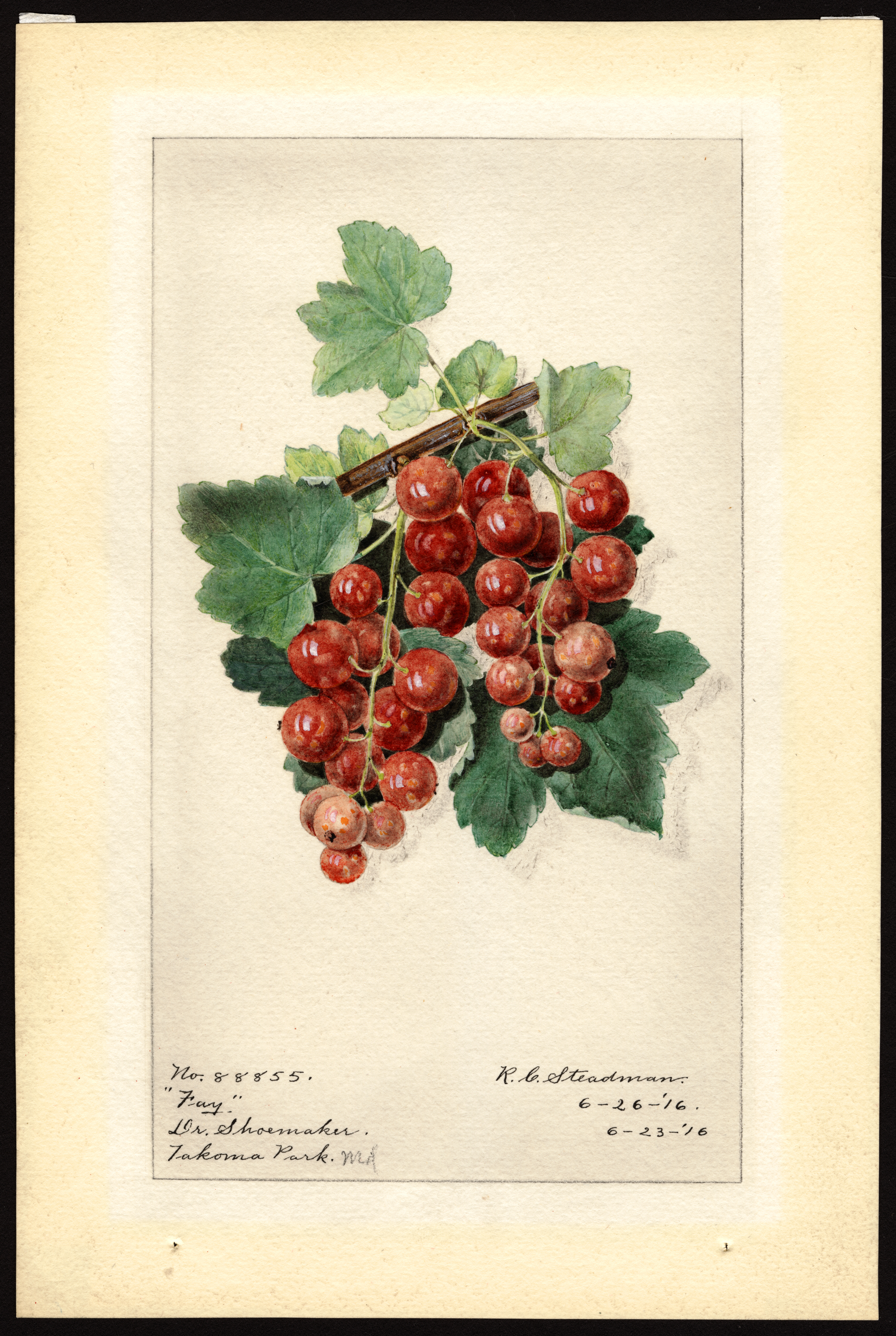
Watercolor by Royal Charles Steadman of Fay gooseberry cultivar, 1916.

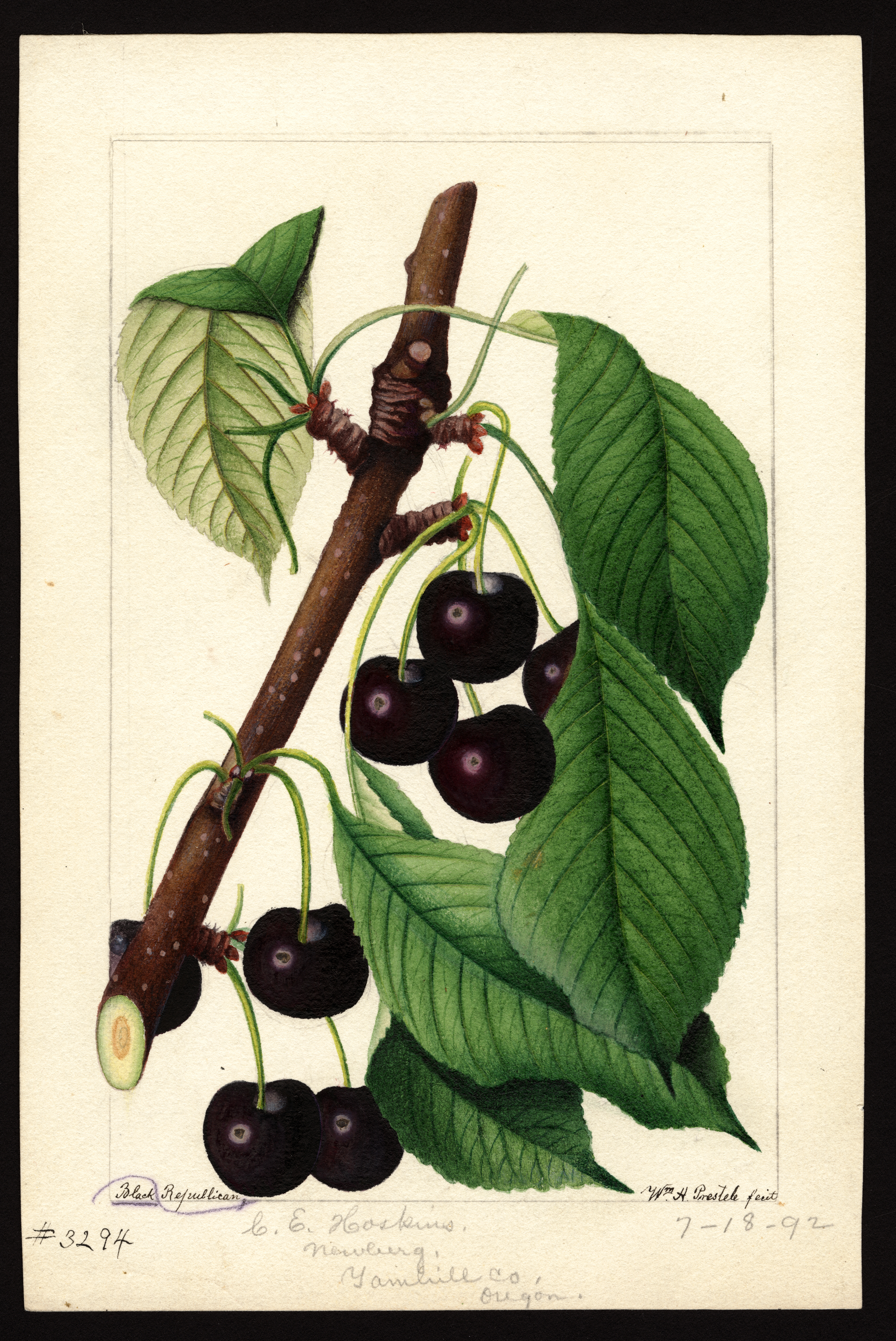
Watercolor by William Henry Prestele of wild cherry (Prunus avium), 1892.

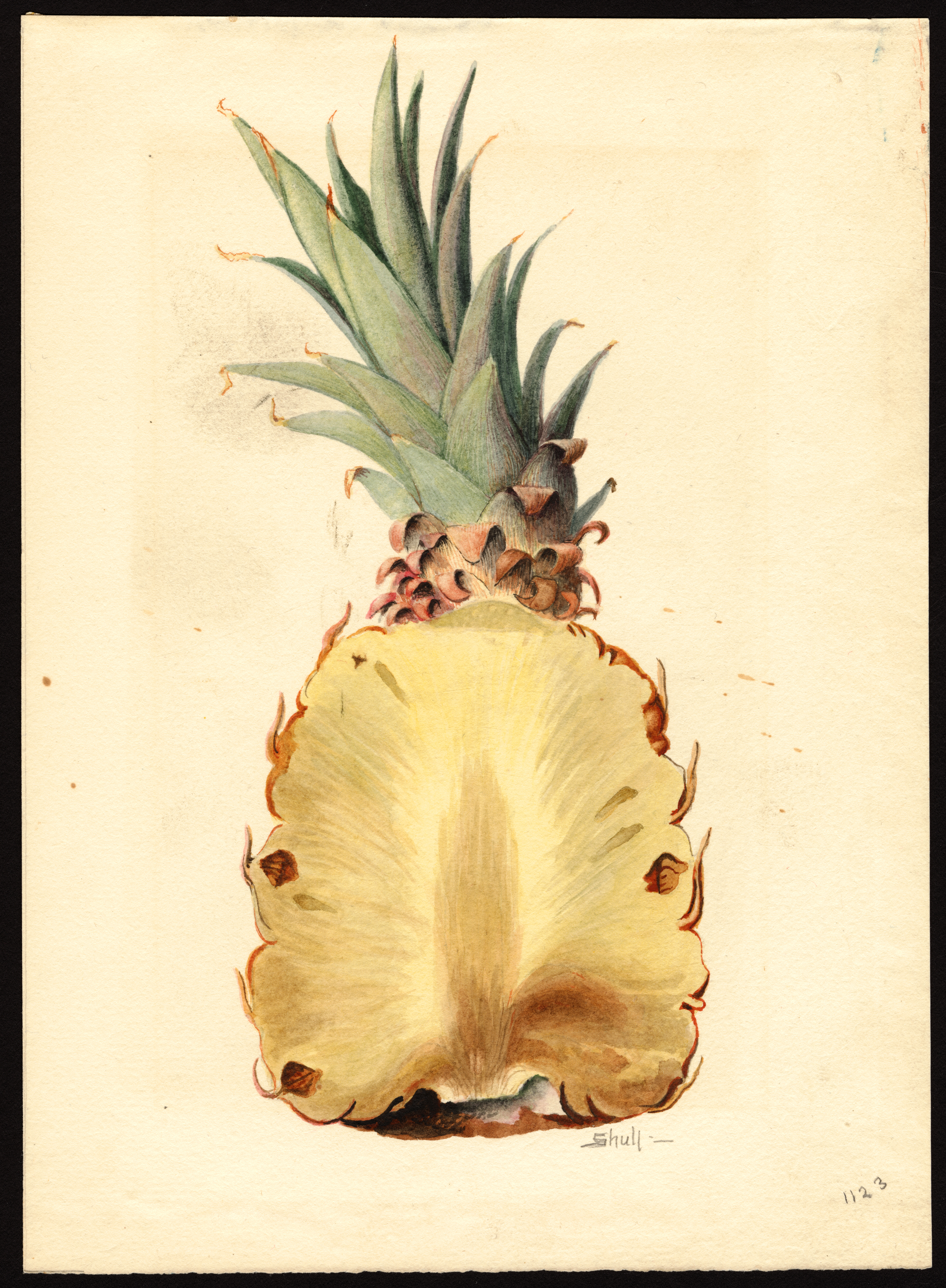
Watercolor by J. Marion Shull of pineapple (Ananas comosus), 1919.
