= Mary Daisy Arnold =

American painter

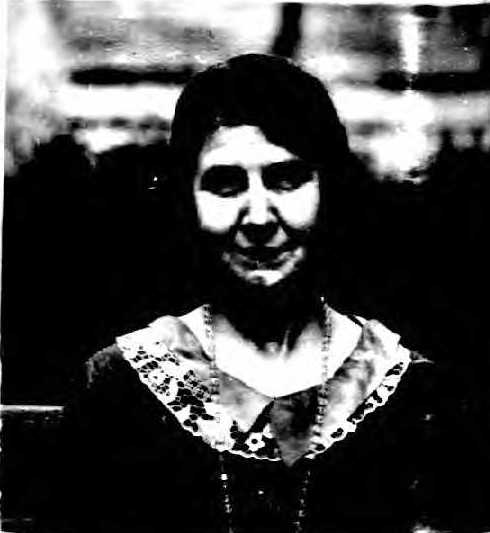
- Born: ca. 1873; Washington, DC, US
- Died: August 13, 1955; Takoma Park, Maryland, US
- Known for: botanical illustration

Mary Daisy Arnold (c. 1873 – August 13, 1955) was a botanical artist who worked for the United States Department of Agriculture (USDA) for over thirty-five years, painting watercolors of a wide variety of fruits. She is one of the three most prolific artists whose work is now preserved in the USDA's Pomological Watercolor Collection.

== Biography ==
Arnold studied art in New York and began her long career with USDA in 1904, becoming part of a part of a select cadre of illustrators that included Deborah Griscom Passmore, Amanda Newton, Elsie Lower, Royal Charles Steadman, and J. Marion Shull. Very little else is known about Arnold. Concerning her USDA career, this may be due partly to the fact that records of the National Personnel Record Center in St. Louis dating from before 1921 have been destroyed.

The 1060 watercolors that Arnold painted for USDA date between 1908 and 1940. Arnold's subjects included many varieties of apples, strawberries, stone fruit, citrus, and other fruits like figs, papayas, and persimmons. She also did some ed work such as mounting and coloring lantern slides.

Arnold lived in the Washington, D.C., area. In addition to her USDA job, she painted landscapes in oil.

== Gallery ==
Watercolor paintings by Mary Daisy Arnold
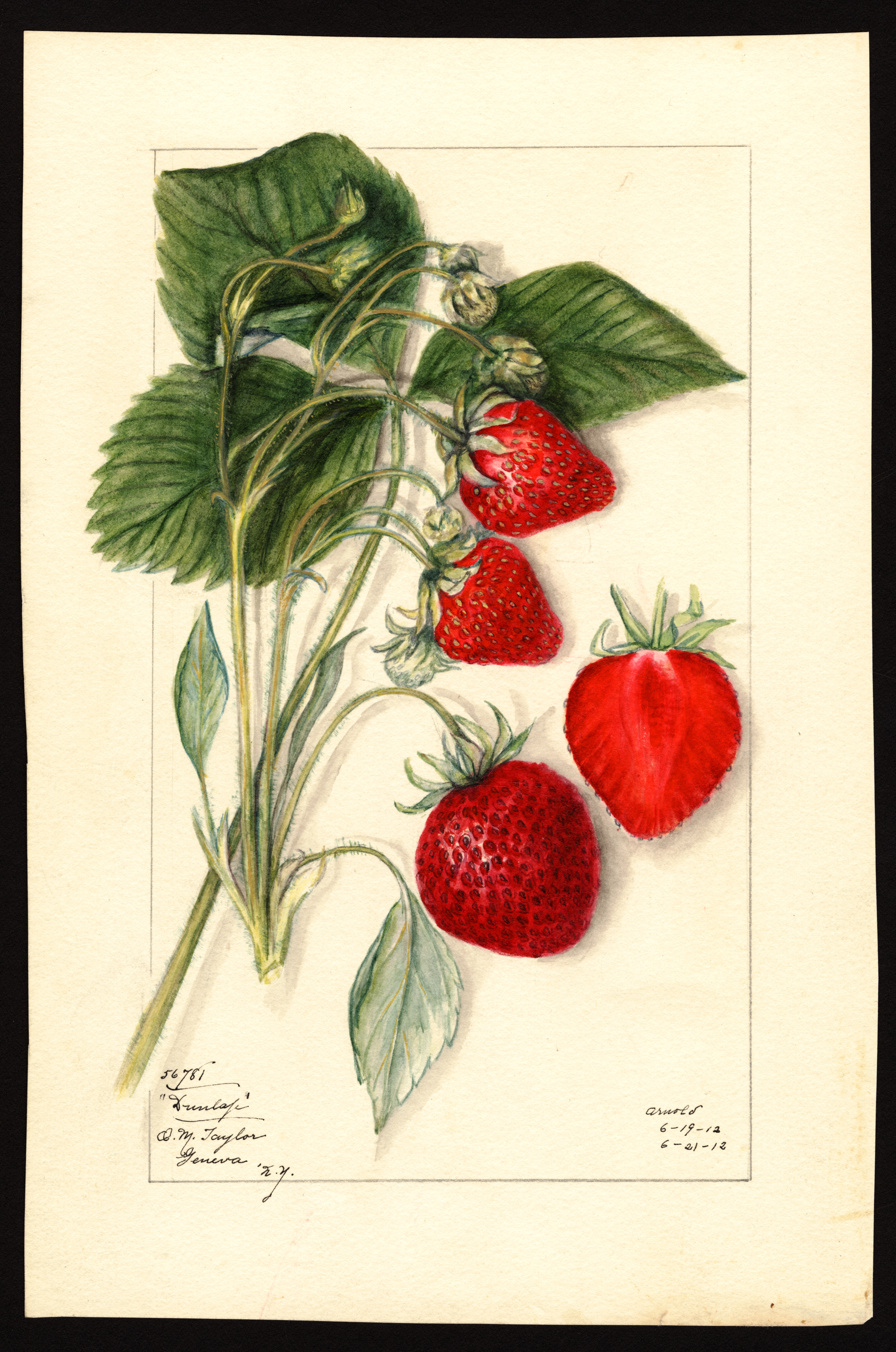
Dunlap variety of strawberries (Fragaria species), with specimen originating in Geneva, New York; watercolor by Mary Daisy Arnold, 1912

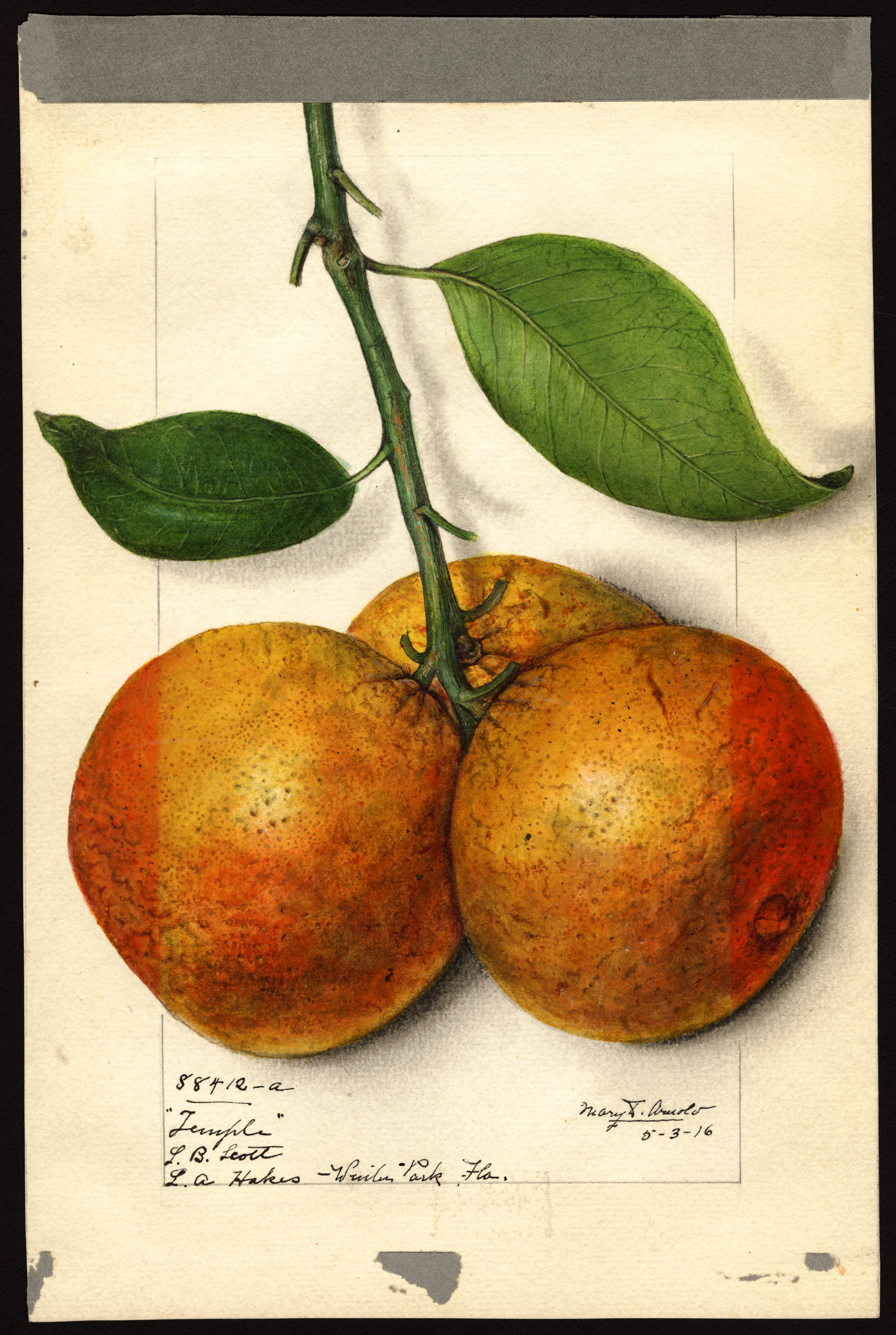
Temple variety of orange (Citrus sinensis), with specimen originating in Winter Park, Florida; watercolor by Mary Daisy Arnold, 1915
