= Amanda Newton =

Amanda Newton may refer to:

- Amanda Newton (illustrator)
- Amanda Newton (netball)
