= Cyrus B. Lower =

American soldier and Medal of Honor recipient (1843–1924)

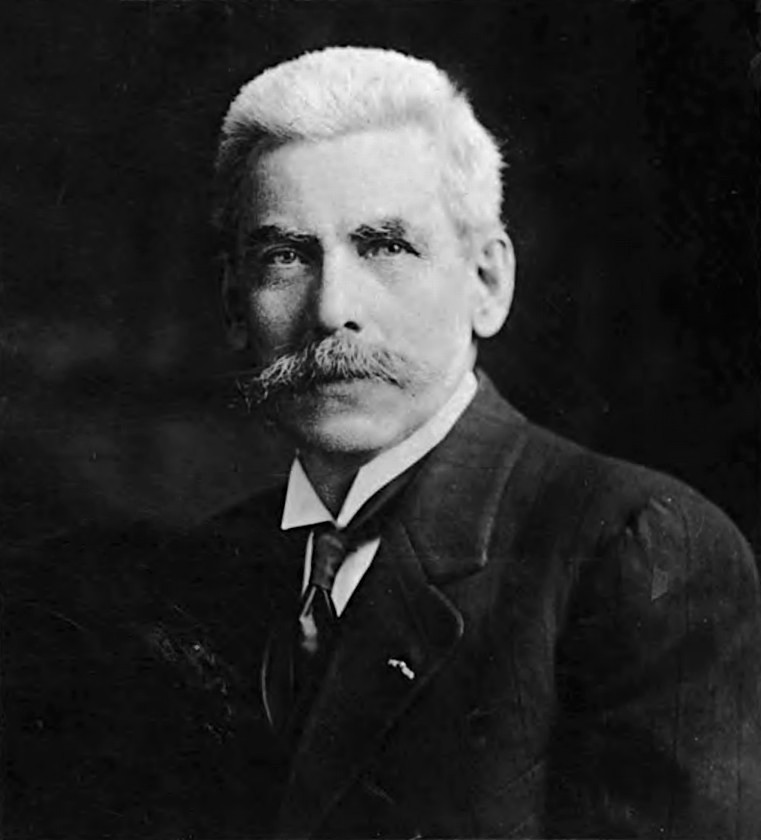
- C.B. Lower, 1899
- Born: Cyrus Benson Lower; February 28, 1843; Mahoning Township, Lawrence County, Pennsylvania, US
- Died: May 21, 1924 (aged 81); Washington, District of Columbia, US
- Burial place: Arlington National Cemetery, Arlington, Virginia
- Military career
- Allegiance: United States of America
- Branch: United States Army (Union Army)
- Service years: 1863–1865
- Rank: Corporal
- Units: Company E, 23rd Ohio Volunteer Infantry Regiment; Company K, 13th Pennsylvania Reserve Regiment ("Bucktails")
- Conflicts: American Civil War: Battle of Carnifex Ferry; Battle of Antietam; Battle of the Wilderness
- Awards: Medal of Honor

Cyrus Benson Lower (February 28, 1843 – May 21, 1924) was a United States soldier who fought with the Union Army during the American Civil War as a private in the 13th Pennsylvania Reserve Regiment (also known as the "Bucktails" or 42nd Pennsylvania Infantry). He received his nation's highest award for valor, the U.S. Medal of Honor, for his display of gallantry during the Battle of the Wilderness on May 7, 1864, and afterward when he rejoined his regiment after having been wounded in action and held as a prisoner of war by Confederate States Army troops. That award was conferred on July 20, 1887.

== Formative years ==
Born on February 28, 1843, in Mahoning Township, Lawrence County, Pennsylvania, Cyrus B. Lower was a son of Samuel and Mary Bryan Lower. During his formative years, he resided with his parents near the Western Pennsylvania community of Edinburg.

== Civil War ==
In 1861, Cyrus B. Lower became one of his nation's early responders to President Abraham Lincoln's call for volunteers to defend Washington, D.C. following the April 1861 fall of Fort Sumter to the Confederate States Army. During the early summer, he left his home state and headed for Poland, Ohio where, on June 21, he enrolled for Civil War military service, and mustered in as a private with Company E of the 23rd Ohio Infantry. After fighting with his regiment in the Battle of Carnifex Ferry, Virginia on September 10, he was then wounded in action in Maryland on September 18 while fighting with his regiment near Antietam. Shot in the left hand by a rifle, he sustained further damage when the ball traveled up and through his wrist joint. After three months of treatment for his injuries and subsequent convalescence at a Union Army hospital in New York, he returned to service with the 23rd Ohio at its headquarters at Camp White in West Virginia, but was quickly discharged on a surgeon's certificate and sent home to Pennsylvania when his superiors determined that he was still not fully recuperated.

Two years later, Lower re-enlisted for Civil War service. After re-enrolling in New Castle, Pennsylvania on October 27, 1863, he then mustered in at Camp Curtin in Harrisburg on October 30 as a private with Company K of the 13th Pennsylvania Reserve Regiment (also known as the "Bucktails" or 42nd Pennsylvania Infantry). Military records at the time described him as a 20-year-old farmer and native of Lawrence County, Pennsylvania who was 5' 9-1/2" tall with brown hair, gray eyes and a light complexion.

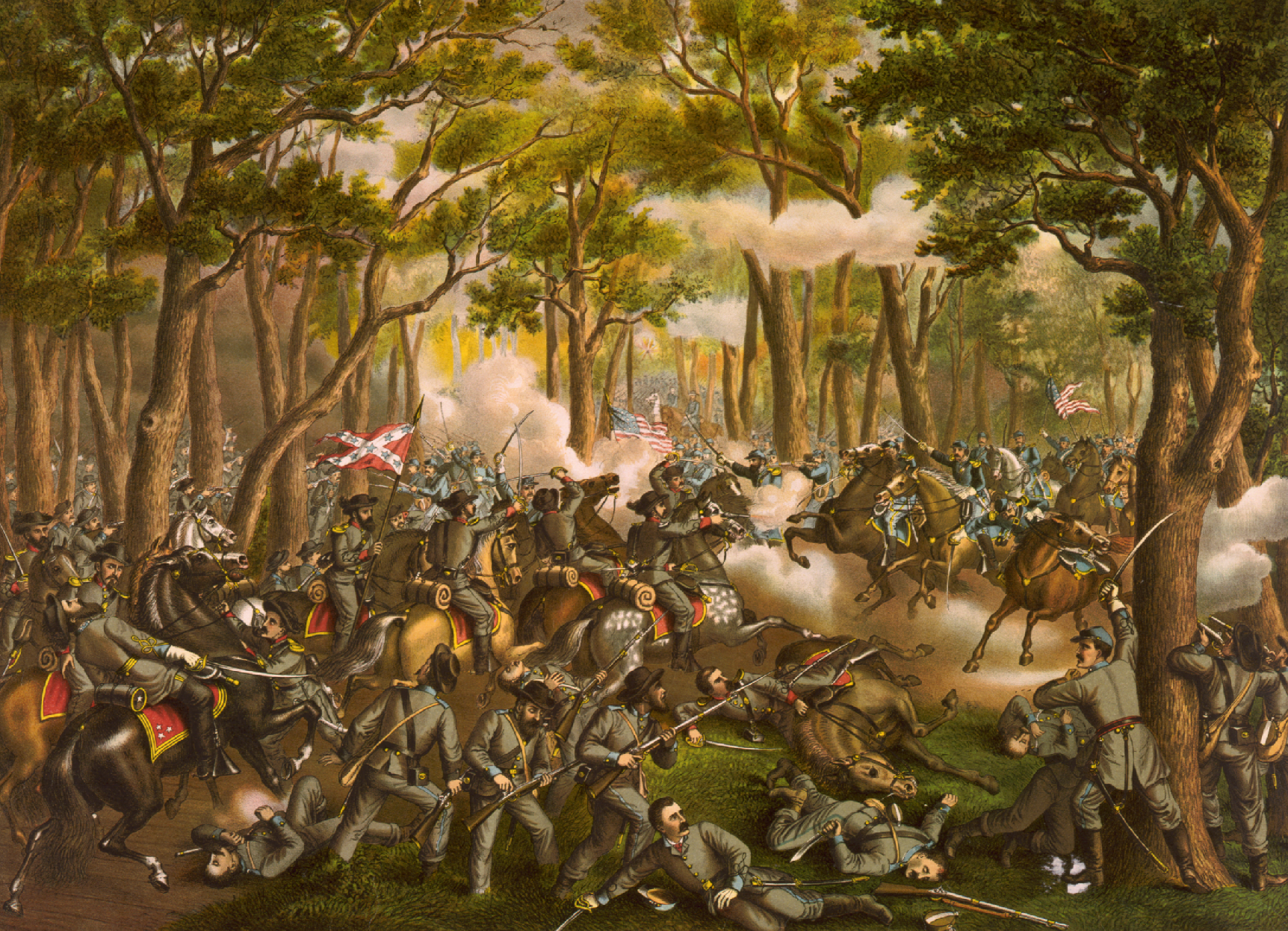
Battle of the Wilderness, Virginia (May 5–7, 1864).

In 1864, he performed the acts of valor which would result in his later being awarded the U.S. Medal of Honor. After being wounded in the thigh on May 7 while fighting with his regiment in the Battle of the Wilderness, Virginia, he continued to march with his fellow Bucktails as they drove Confederate troops through Virginia. His injury hampered his movements, however, and he was captured (on May 30). On June 13, while being transported by rail to the CSA's prisoner of war (POW) camp at Andersonville, Georgia, he jumped from the train, and escaped by making his way north to rejoin his regiment in Virginia. Subsequently transferred to the 190th Pennsylvania Infantry as part of a reorganization of Pennsylvania military units, he continued to serve until he mustered out on June 28, 1865, at Arlington Heights, Virginia.

== Post-war life ==
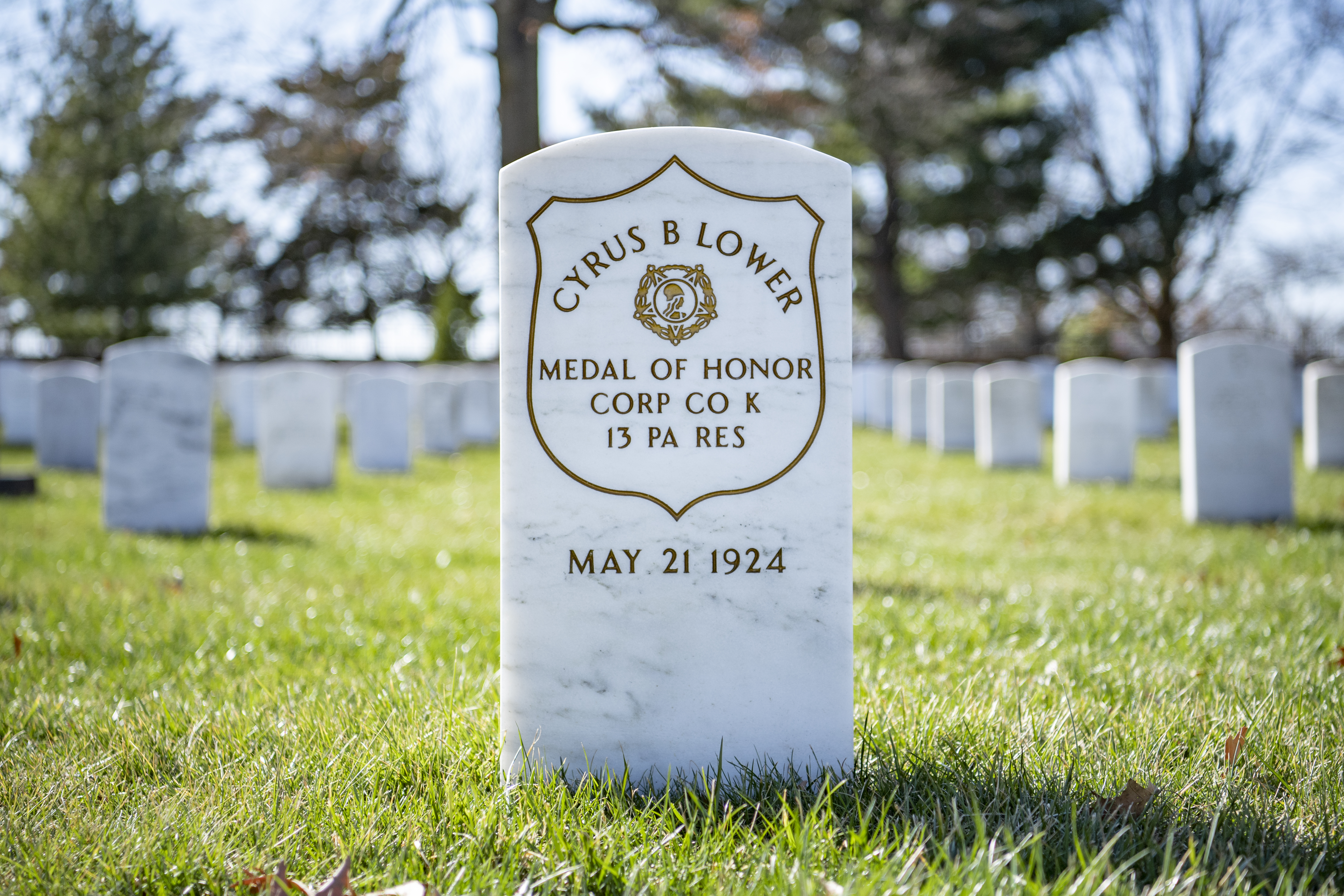
Grave at Arlington National Cemetery

Following his honorable discharge from the military, Lower returned home to Pennsylvania where, sometime around 1869, he wed Sarah Edwards. Sons Elton and John Edward were then born, respectively, on March 9, 1870, and March 18, 1873. Superintendent of his county's Greenwood Cemetery, Lower also supported his family through the proceeds he made from his nursery business. Widowed by his wife in 1879, he relocated to Washington, D.C. where he ultimately obtained work with the U.S. Department of Agriculture. On November 8, 1881, he remarried. He and his wife, Florence (Hinton) Lower, then welcomed the births of two children, Elsie Lower Pomeroy on September 30, 1882, and Irvin Bard on July 3, 1892.

Lower died on May 21, 1924. Following funeral services, he was laid to rest in Section 17, Lot 19971 at Arlington National Cemetery in Arlington, Virginia.

== Medal of Honor citation ==
Rank and organization: Private, Company K, 13th Pennsylvania Reserves. Place and date: At Wilderness, Va., May 7, 1864. Entered service at: ------. Birth: Lawrence County, Pa. Date of issue. July 20, 1887. Citation:

Gallant services and soldierly qualities in voluntarily rejoining his command after having been wounded.

== Publications ==
- Lower, C. B. We Rode with Little Phil and Other Poems. Washington, D.C.: Gibson Brothers, 1899. OCLC 5796475

== See also ==
- List of Medal of Honor recipients
- List of American Civil War Medal of Honor recipients: G–L
- Pennsylvania in the American Civil War
