= Isaac Newton (agriculturalist) =

First United States Commissioner of Agriculture (1800–67)

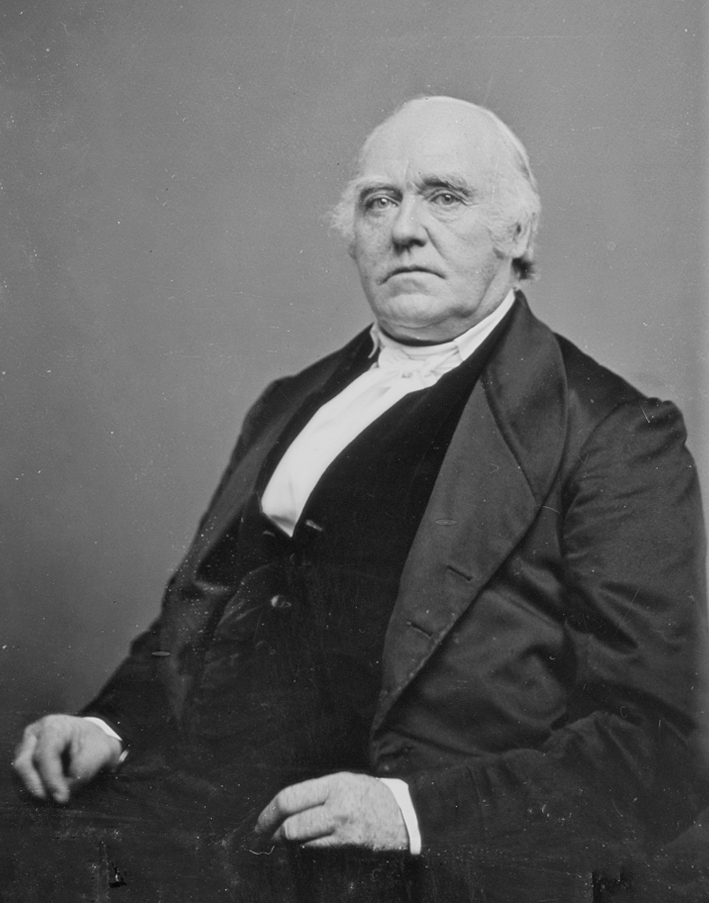
- Newton c. 1860–65

1st United States Commissioner of Agriculture
- In office July 1, 1862 – June 19, 1867
- President: Abraham Lincoln; Andrew Johnson
- Preceded by: Position established
- Succeeded by: Horace Capron

Personal details
- Born: March 31, 1800 Burlington County, New Jersey, U.S.
- Died: June 19, 1867 (aged 67) Washington, D.C., U.S.

Isaac Newton (March 31, 1800 – June 19, 1867) was an American agriculturalist who was the first United States Commissioner of Agriculture from 1862 to 1867.

== Life and career ==
Newton was born in Burlington County, New Jersey, on March 31, 1800, to Isaac and Mary Newton, a Quaker family of English descent. His father died when he was still a baby, and Newton grew up on his paternal grandfather's farm. He attended local schools but did not go to college. At the age of 21, he married Dorothy Birdsall and became the manager of a pair of adjacent farms in Delaware County, Pennsylvania. His entrepreneurial spirit led him to also open an ice cream and confectionery store in Philadelphia as a source of extra income.

Around 1854, Newton bought 1000 acres of farmland in Virginia, which he hired overseers to run when his wife refused to live there. A series of disasters (among them the outbreak of the Civil War) sent Newton to Washington, D.C., in search of a government job. At some earlier point, he had begun selling farm products to the White House, and he had recently made the acquaintance of President Abraham Lincoln, so he was well-positioned to seek a job at a time when the war had filled Washington with place-seekers. In 1861, he became superintendent of the Agricultural Division of the United States Patent Office.

The following year, when Congress established the United States Department of Agriculture (USDA), Newton was appointed the USDA's first commissioner. The appointment was controversial; at least one agricultural publication wrote a sarcastic and almost certainly unfair editorial headlined "Who is Isaac Newton?" alleging that he was illiterate. Washington journalist Benjamin Perley Poore said Newton was "an ignorant, credulous old gentleman," the butt of jokes, who was all too easily tricked by dishonest contractors. The more modern view is that he was "energetic and basically sound" in his ideas for the development of the brand-new department. Among other things, he was responsible for inaugurating the USDA's statistical services to collect and analyze agricultural data. He also championed a nationwide system of daily weather reports for farmers, which eventually led to establishment of the U.S. Weather Service under USDA. He even set up an experimental farm on what is now the National Mall quite near the Capitol—in fact, right where today's USDA headquarters stand.

Newton arranged for the USDA to issue monthly and annual agricultural reports. These were very popular with farmers and circulated widely. However, they also represented a potential threat to established agricultural journals, so it is not surprising that many of the editors of these journals repeatedly called for Newton to step down. Newton did not help his own cause by vigorously abusing his most vocal critics and by indulging in nepotism. For example, he appointed a son to take charge of his experimental farm, and he twice appointed a nephew to be chief clerk of the USDA. (His paternal granddaughter, Amanda Newton, also worked for the USDA, but she was hired many years after his death.) Despite everything, he retained President Lincoln's support up to the president's death.

In July 1866, Newton suffered a heat stroke while visiting his experimental farm, and he never fully recovered. He died a little less than a year later, on June 19, 1867.

Political offices
New office	United States Commissioner of Agriculture; 1862–1867	Succeeded by Horace Capron
