= Ellen Isham Schutt =

American botanical illustrator

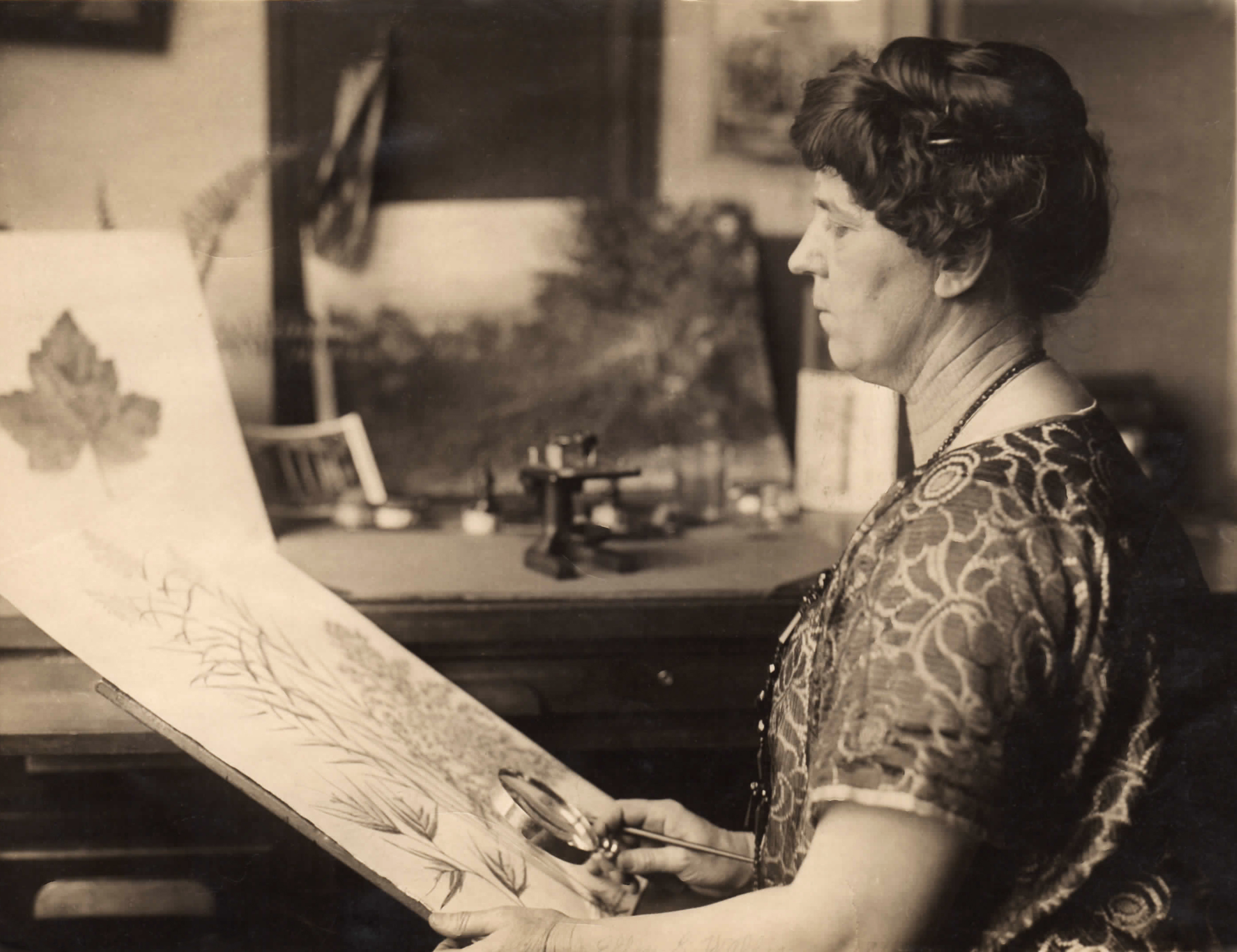
- Born: April 15, 1873; Arlington, Virginia, U.S.
- Died: December 5, 1955 (aged 82); Falls Church, Virginia, U.S.
- Other names: Ellen Isham Schutt Wallis
- Occupation: Botanical illustrator
- Employer: United States Department of Agriculture
- Spouse(s): Walter David Blackburn (m. 1914) Thomas Smythe Wallis (m. 1917–1949)

Ellen Isham Schutt (April 15, 1873 – December 5, 1955) was an early 20th-century American botanical illustrator for the U.S. Department of Agriculture. Her work now forms part of the USDA National Agricultural Library's Pomological Watercolor Collection.

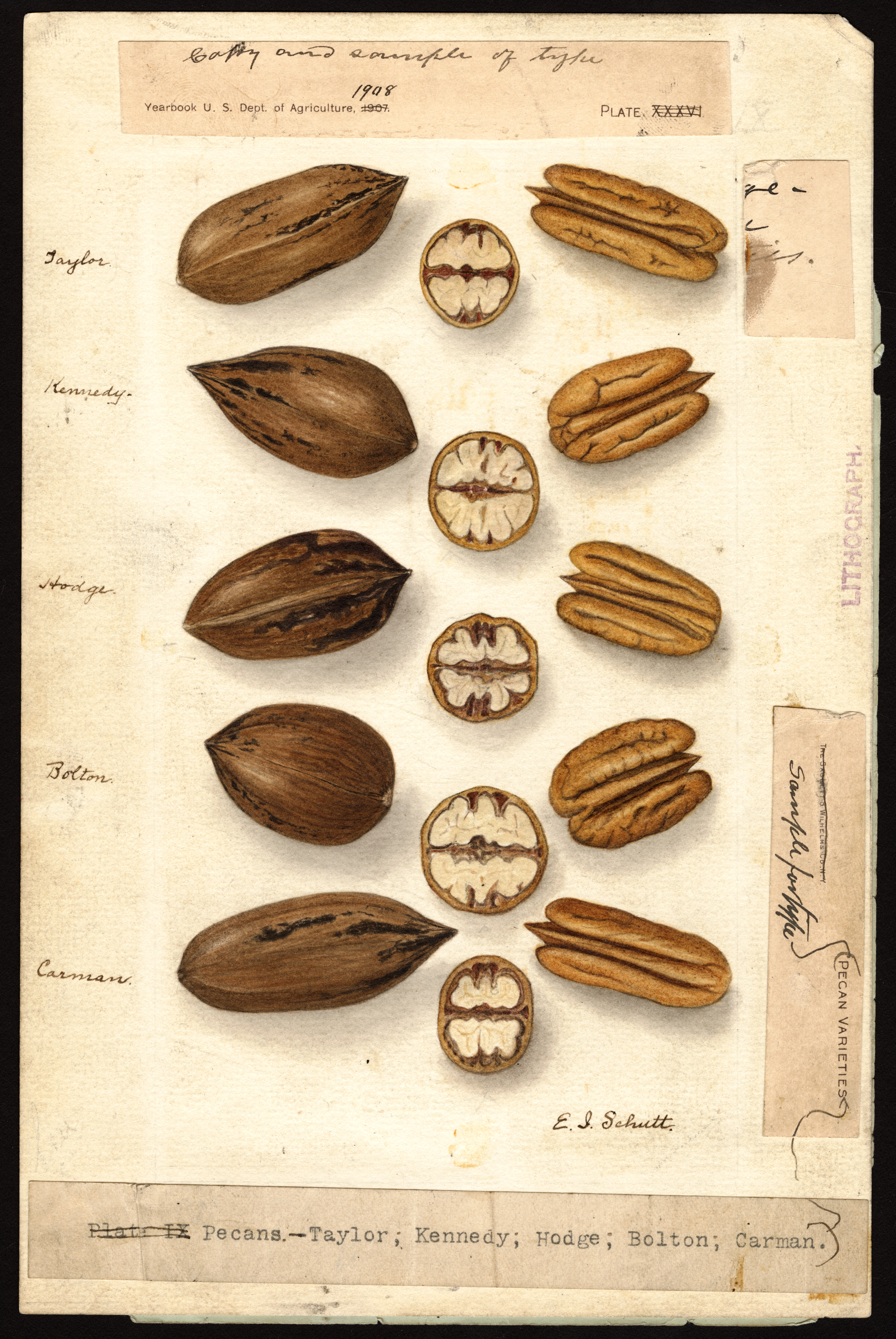
Watercolor of pecans (Carya illinoinensis) by Ellen Isham Schutt ca. 1904–14. Varieties shown include Taylor, Kennedy, Hodge, Bolton, and Carman.

== Early life and family ==
Ellen Isham Schutt was born on April 15, 1873, on Oak Grove estate in Arlington, Virginia, to Francis Granger Schutt (a merchant of Dutch descent) and Emily Elizabeth Thomas Schutt (née Wallis). She was one of seven children, with two brothers (Francis and Wallis) and four sisters (Blanch, Elizabeth, Stella, and Mary). They were raised in what is now Cherrydale, Virginia, where her father had bought land after the Civil War. Ellen's father eventually acquired nearly 300 acres in the area and is now considered one of the fathers of modern Cherrydale.

In 1906, Ellen built a substantial neoclassical house in Cherrydale that was known as "Ellenwood." It was built entirely of concrete as protection against fire, and it is said to have been the first home in the area to get electricity.

Ellen and her mother were interested in genealogy and together created numerous unpublished family trees and other records relating to the Wallis family that were later archived at the Maryland Historical Society. In 1914, Ellen served as the state recording secretary of the Virginia chapter of the Daughters of the American Revolution.

== Career ==
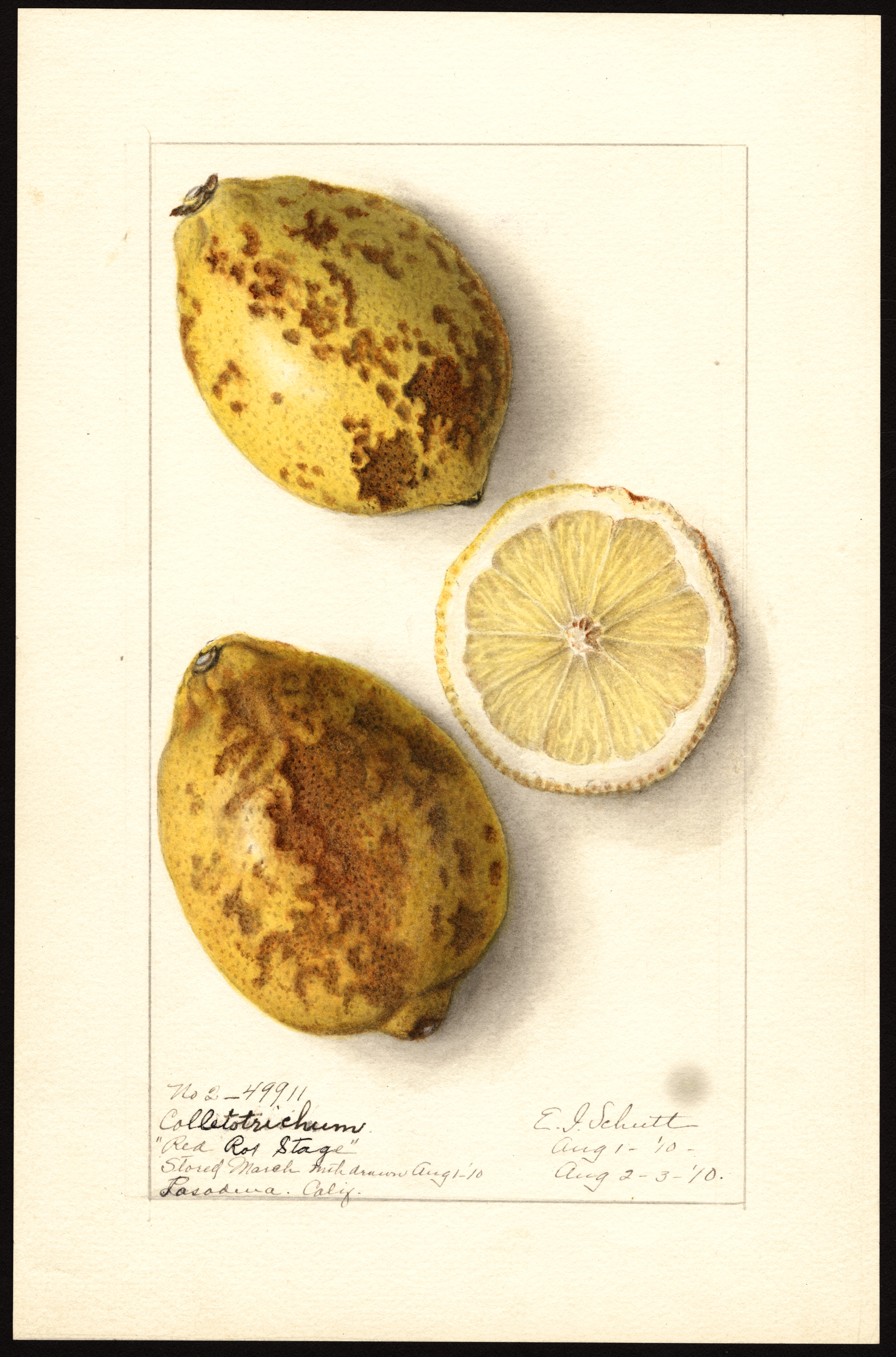
Watercolor of lemons (Citrus limon) by Ellen Isham Schutt, 1910, showing red rot from five months of cold storage.

Schutt worked for the United States Department of Agriculture between 1904 and 1914, part of a select cadre of illustrators that included Deborah Griscom Passmore, Amanda Newton, Royal Charles Steadman, J. Marion Shull, and Elsie Lower. During this period, she painted over 700 watercolors of fruits and nuts for the USDA. Her subjects ranged from the common (apples, hickory nuts) to the then-exotic (bael, custard apple, cashew nuts), and quite a few show fruit damage from molds, insects, and other causes. Her precise and rather dry style resulted in watercolors that at times look more like drawings than paintings. She signed her USDA watercolors 'E.I. Schutt'. She also modeled some fruit such as apples and pears in wax to demonstrate the effects of long storage and packaging upon fruit. She contributed a few drawings of plant specimens collected in Mexico to Britton and Rose's definitive work on cactus.

Beginning in 1911, the University of California commissioned Schutt to paint watercolors of apples grown locally and showing damage from conditions ranging from disease and insect damage to storage injury. One scholar argues that this series of "hyperreal" images amounts to an implied representation of the idea of a perfect or normal apple, a vision suitable to Progressive era aspirations of control over natural forces like decay. The full series of 286 watercolors painted between 1911 and 1915 is held by the University of California, Davis.

== Personal life and death ==
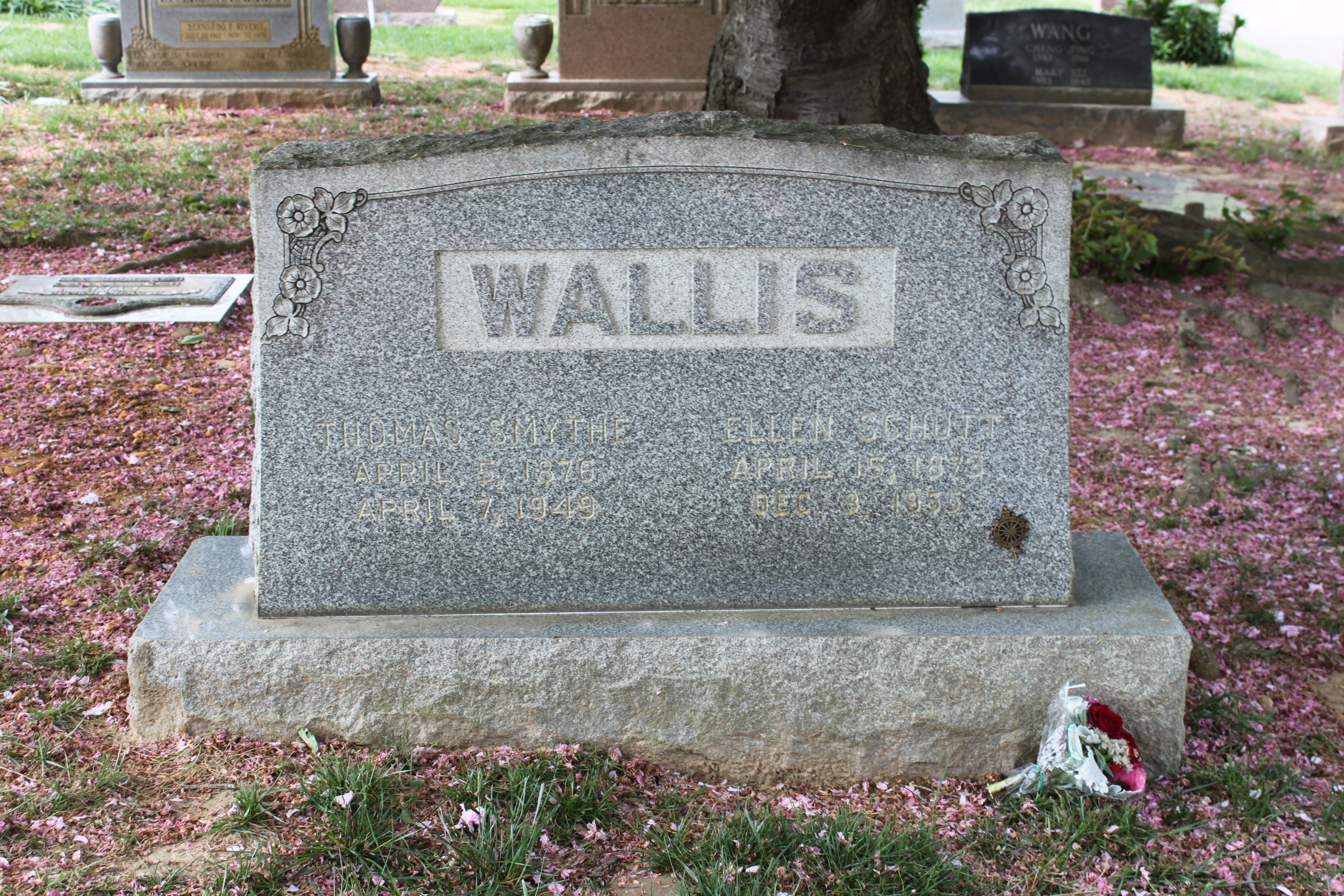
Grave of Schutt at Columbia Gardens Cemetery

In 1914, the year her father died, she married Walter David Blackburn in Florida. This marriage did not last, and in 1917 she married her first cousin, Thomas Smythe Wallis (1876–1949), in Virginia.

Ellen died on December 5, 1955, at Falls Church, Virginia, and is buried in Columbia Gardens Cemetery in Arlington.
