= Mary Anne Arnold =

Mary Anne Arnold (born c. 1825) was an English sailor and crossdresser. She was born in Sheerness, Kent, England and worked aboard the naval ship, Robert Small until the captain of the ship discovered she was assigned female at birth.

== Early life ==
At age 10, Arnold's mother died. She thus performed physical labour to provide for herself, and her eight month old sister. Arnold first gained employment at a rope factory in Sheerness. Upon discovering that boys her age were making significantly more money as sailors, she began to crossdress and gained employment as a cabin boy in the Williams, a Sutterland collier.

== Cabin boy ==
Arnold sailed with the Williams for two years until 1839 (she changed ships due to her dislike of the commanding officer) at which point she became a cabin boy for the Anne. She successfully sailed with the Anne for several voyages until the ship wrecked but she survived and then transferred to sail on the ship Choice which held stores for the Robert Small.

== Suspicions ==
While on the Choice, around the age of 15, several of the men reported to the captain suspicions of Arnold's crossdressing. The captain ordered a doctor to perform a medical exam on Arnold. After the exam, she was forced to remove her sailor's clothes and don clothes that matched her sex.
