= Royal Charles Steadman =

American painter

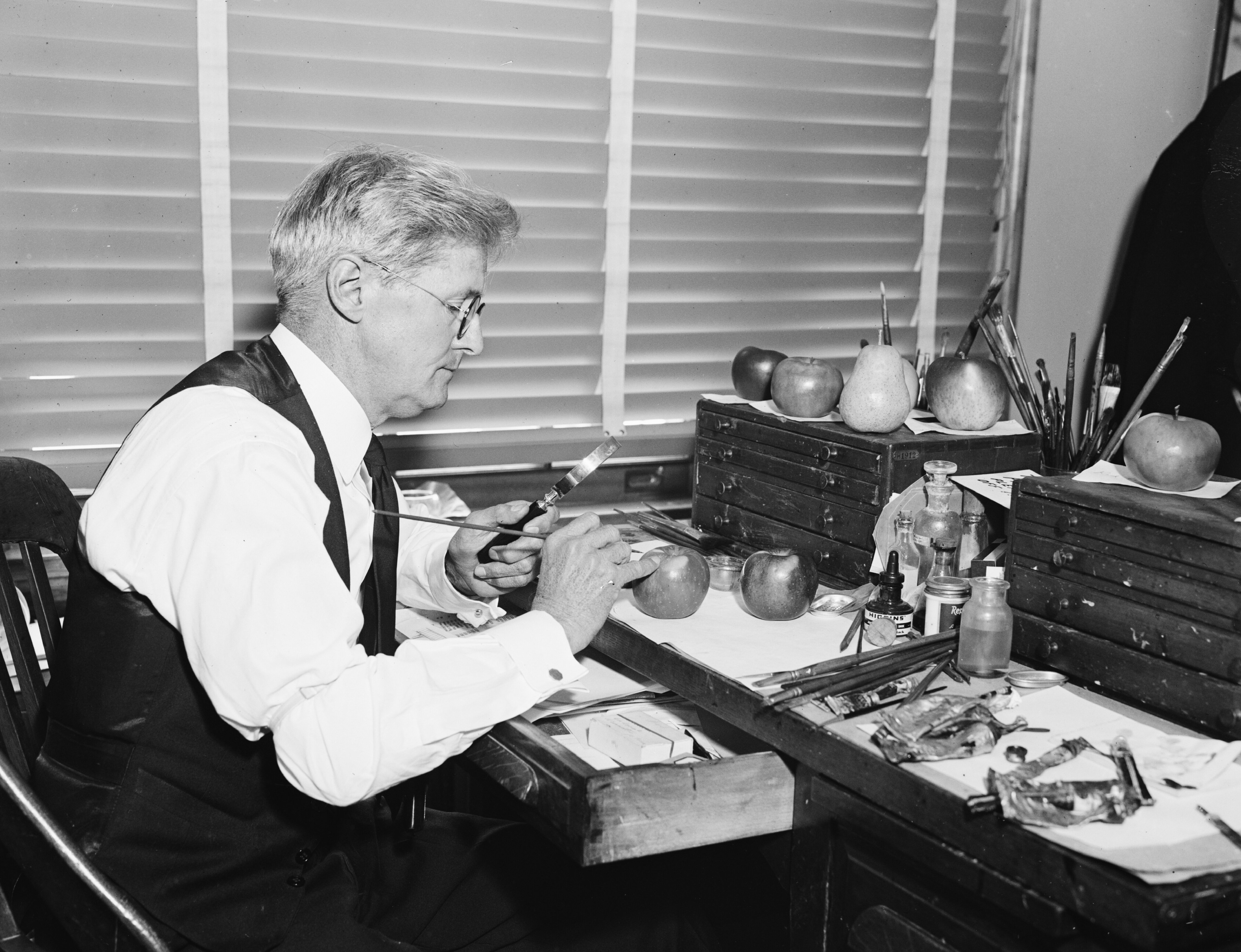
- Steadman painting wax models of fruit in 1935
- Born: July 23, 1875; Portland, Maine
- Died: August 6, 1964 (aged 89); Banning, California

Royal Charles Steadman (July 23, 1875 – August 6, 1964) was a botanical illustrator and wax fruit modeler for the United States Department of Agriculture (USDA) who also developed a patented method of strengthening wax fruit with plaster on the interior.

== Education and personal life ==
Royal Charles Steadman was born July 23, 1875, in Portland, Maine, to Alban Charles and Emma Frances Steadman. He had an older brother, Willie. His parents separated and by 1891 his father had remarried and moved to Boston, Massachusetts. Steadman studied art at the School of the Museum of Fine Arts, Boston, as well as at the Cowles Art School in the same city. He went on to study jewelry design at the Rhode Island School of Design in Providence and then became a jewelry designer for a commercial firm, where he rose to head jewelry designer. He also did some scenic design, and he taught at the Rhode Island School of Design.

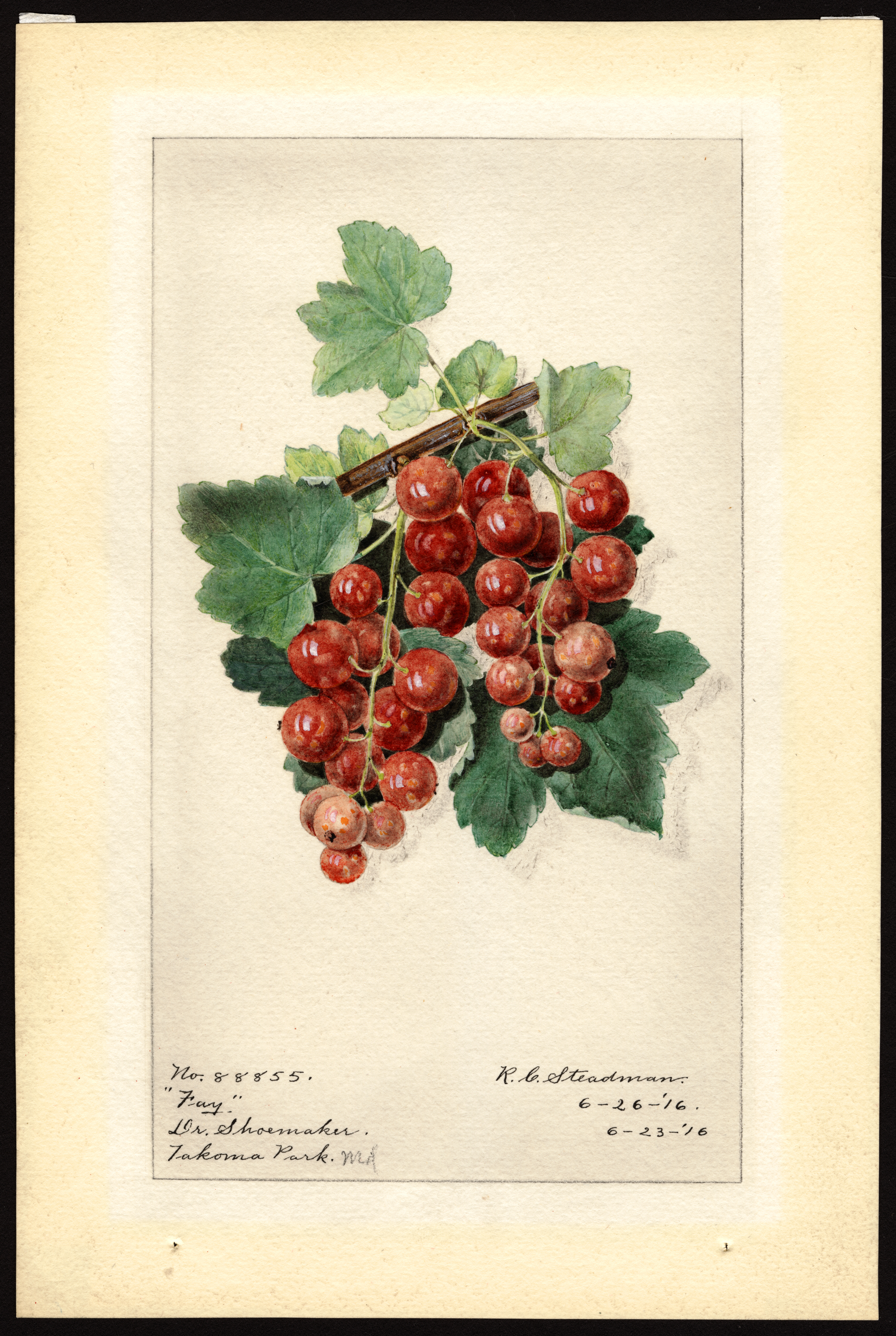
Fay gooseberry cultivar, watercolor by Royal Charles Steadman, 1916.

Steadman married Myra L. Fuller in Brockton, Massachusetts, in 1894. The marriage did not last, and in 1905 Steadman married again, to Harriet Eliza "Hattie" Beckley, with whom he had a son, Royal Beckley Steadman, in 1908. This marriage also ended, and in 1933 Steadman married his third wife, Ethel Augusta Rosenberger, who survived her husband by a decade.

== USDA career ==
Steadman joined the USDA in 1915 as a pomological artist for the Bureau of Plant Industry, where he was one of a select group of botanical illustrators that included Deborah Griscom Passmore, Amanda Newton, Ellen Isham Schutt, and Elsie Lower. Five years later he was promoted to the position of botanical artist. Steadman (who signed his work 'R.C. Steadman') painted delicate, meticulously detailed watercolors of fruits and vegetables ranging from the common (citrus, strawberries, grapes, pears, plums, watermelons) to the then-exotic (cashew nuts, pawpaw, avocado, cherimoya). Many of these were painted at the peak of ripeness, but he also did a series showing fruit damaged by freezing and cold storage. He also produced a few pen-and-ink drawings, a handful of flower paintings (daffodil, iris, and tulip), a few historical scenes, some designs for postage stamps, and—as a favor to Amanda Newton—a portrait of her grandfather Isaac Newton, who had been the first U.S. Commissioner of Agriculture.

Steadman also made and painted hollow wax fruit models showing the characteristics of different cultivars for the USDA's permanent records. In 1932, he patented a method for strengthening his wax models with plaster of Paris. A small amount of liquid plaster would be injected through an inconspicuous hole in the fruit (with a second hole made for air release), after which the fruit would be rapidly rotated so as to create a thin, shell-like coating on the inside of the model. Once the plaster dried and the holes were patched, the fruit became less likely to distortion when heated and less likely to break. The added plaster also brought the model's weight closer to that of the original fruit, thus adding to the verisimilitude of the reproduction.

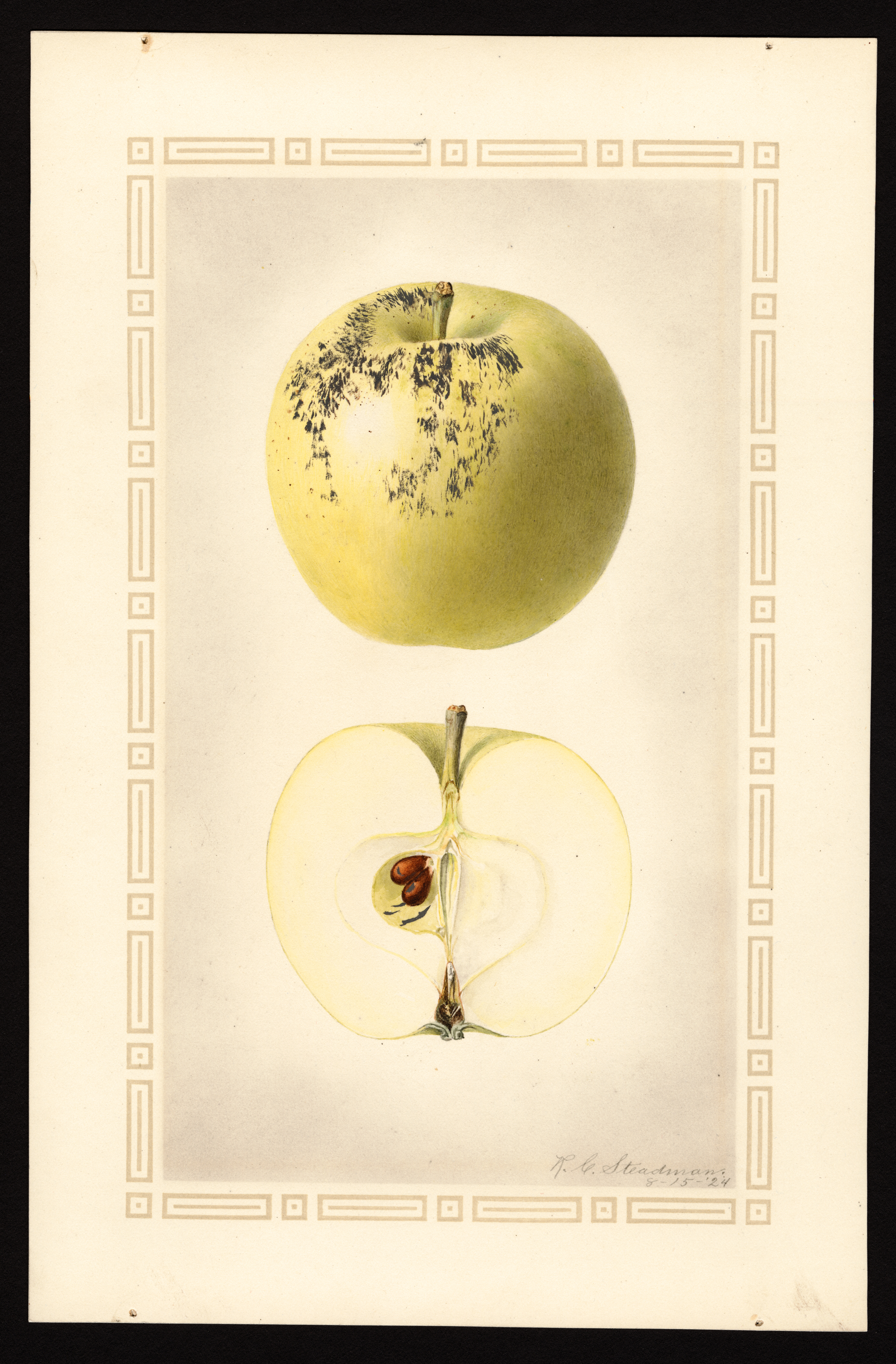
Shoemaker apple cultivar showing mold damage, watercolor by Royal Charles Steadman, 1924.

Steadman retired in 1941, having produced almost 900 watercolors in the course of his 26-year career with the USDA. In 1943, he painted a portrait of former U.S. Secretary of Agriculture James Wilson and gave the portrait to the department to hang in the Wilson arch between the Administration and South buildings. He died on August 6, 1964, in Banning, California. USDA's National Agricultural Library holds his watercolors in its Pomological Watercolor Collection and also has a small archive of his papers from the period 1923–1928.
