= Esther Heins =

American artist and author (1908–2007)

Esther Heins (November 10, 1908 – December 3, 2007) was an American artist, scientific illustrator, and author known for her botanical illustrations.

== Biography ==
Esther Heins was born on November 10, 1908, in Brooklyn. She attended the Massachusetts School of Art. Heins worked as a commercial art, eventually focusing on botanical illustration. Heins died on December 3, 2007, aged 99. Her work is in the collection of the Museum of Fine Arts, Boston.

== Art career ==
Heins created a series of water color paintings of plants in the Arnold Arboretum. Many of those illustrations were collected into the book Flowering Trees and Shrubs.
