= William Henry Prestele =

German botanical artist

Wilhelm Heinrich Prestele (or William Henry Prestele) (13 October 1838 – 16 August 1895) was a botanical artist known for his lithographs and watercolor work commissioned by the US Department of Agriculture.

== Biography ==
Lithograph created by Prestele of Rubus crataegifolius (Korean Raspberry) and Rubus ursinus (California Blackberry)

Prestele was born on October 13, 1838, in the Grand Duchy of Hesse, to Franz Joseph Martin Prestele and Karoline Russ. The family emigrated to America in 1843, settling first in New York and later in the Amana Colonies in Iowa. His father, known in America as Joseph Prestele, was also a painter and lithographer of flowers and fruits and prior to emigrating had been head gardener for King Ludwig I of Bavaria as well as a staff artist for a time at the Royal Botanical Garden in Munich. From his father he learned the arts of watercolor and lithography.

In the late 1850s, Prestele moved to New York, and in 1861 he joined the Union Army as a private in a regiment of New York volunteers. He was wounded at the battle of Antietam in 1862 and spent the remainder of his service period recovering in hospital. Sometime around 1863, he married an Irish woman named Anne, and with her he had three children—Margaret (1864), Frances (ca. 1869), and Emma (1870)—before Anne died in 1871 or 1872.

In 1867, at the age of 29, William was hired to make a series of nurserymen's plates by Illinois nursery owner Franklin Kelsey Phoenix. He moved his family from New York to Bloomington, Illinois, for this project. No plates from this project are known to have survived, but a write-up in the August 1869 edition of Gardener's Monthly and Horticultural Advertiser praised them in robust terms: "We have now before us a fruit piece... prepared by W. H. Prestele. We are in the habit of admiring European art in this line, and have often wished Americans could successfully compete with it. We now have it here. We never saw anything of the kind better executed from any part of the world".

When this relationship ended in 1871, William briefly went into business with L. B. Littlefield, publishing fruit and flower plates. In 1875, he moved his family to Iowa, not far from the Amana community where he was raised, and married his second wife, Susanna Gefaller. With Susanna, who died in 1882, he had a daughter, Lillian. He set up as a lithographer in Iowa City and practiced this trade for a decade or so.

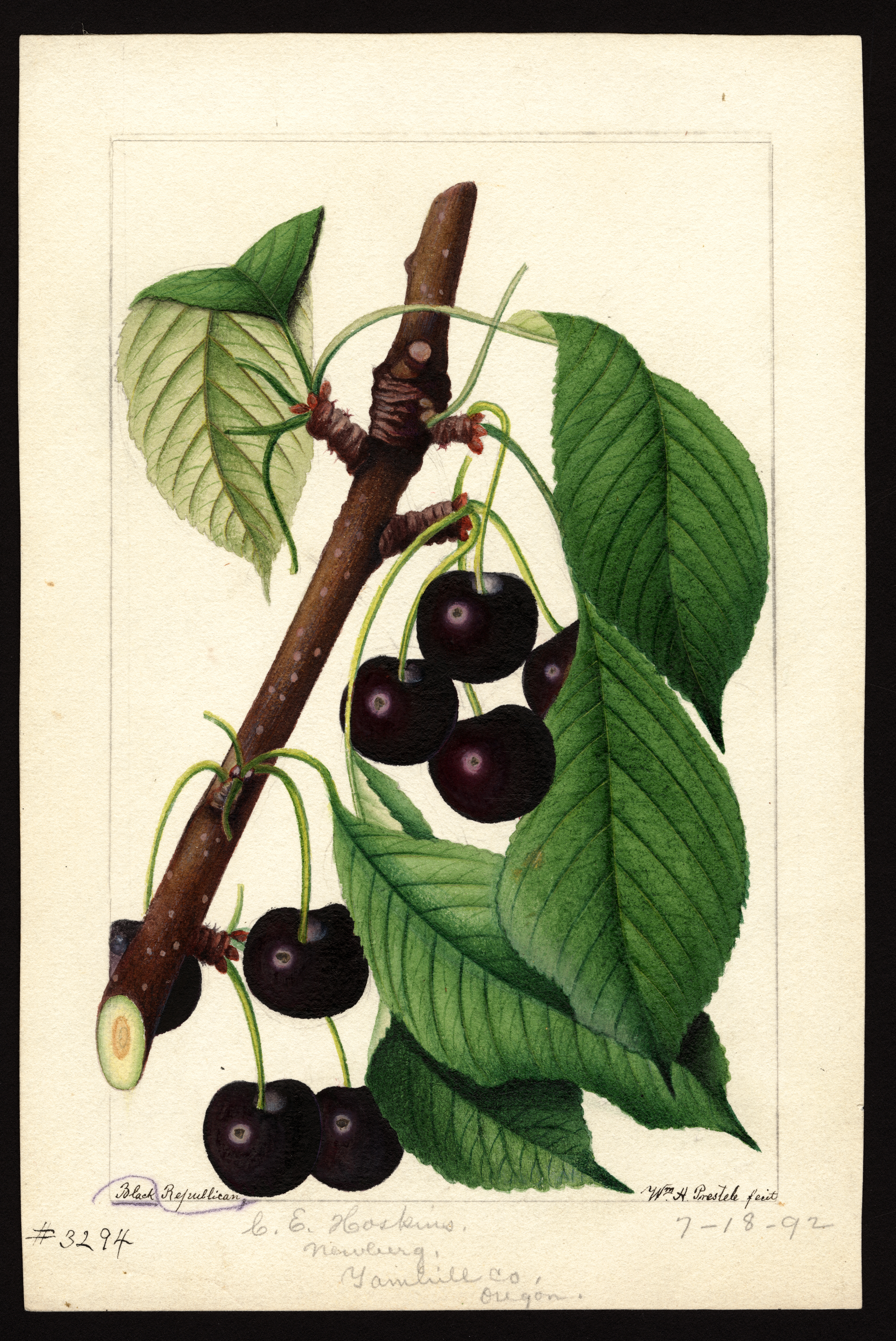
Watercolor of wild cherry (Prunus avium) by William Henry Prestele, 1892

On August 1, 1887, he was appointed as the first artist on the staff of the recently formed Pomological Division of the United States Department of Agriculture in Washington, D.C. He was assigned to make life-size watercolors of native grapes intended as illustrations for a monograph by Thomas Volney Munson of Denison, Texas, a leading authority on native grapes. He worked from live and dried specimens sent to him by Munson, making color sketches of details that Munson would then review; Prestele would then use these detail drawings would to create a life-size painting of the species. The U.S. Secretary of Agriculture eventually decided the cost of printing the monograph with the illustrations would be prohibitive, so it was never published in its intended form, though Munson went on to use the text he wrote as the foundation for his highly regarded book Foundations of American Grape Culture. Munson's book was illustrated with photographs instead of with Prestele's watercolors, which remained in the collection of the USDA.

Prestele's paintings are noted for their naturalness and attention to botanical accuracy. Over a hundred of his watercolors of grapes and other fruit are held in the National Agricultural Library's Pomological Watercolor Collection.

He died in Arlington, Virginia on August 16, 1895, and was buried at Arlington National Cemetery. A collection of his papers spanning the years 1887-1891 is held by the USDA National Agricultural Library Special Collections and comprises original watercolors and drawings, plant specimens, and other materials, including work related to the planned Munson monograph.
