= Louis C. C. Krieger =

American painter

Louis Charles Christopher Krieger (11 February 1873 – 31 July 1940) was an American mycologist and botanical illustrator who was considered the finest painter of North American fungi.

== Personal life ==
Born in Baltimore, Maryland on February 11, 1873, Krieger received his early education from the Lutheran schools in that city. He showed artistic talents at an early age, and at 13 enrolled in the Maryland Institute School of Art and Design. Krieger continued his studies at the Charcoal Club of Baltimore and the Schuler School of Fine Arts. He married Agnes Checkley Keighler in 1904; she died in 1939. They had one daughter.

== Career ==
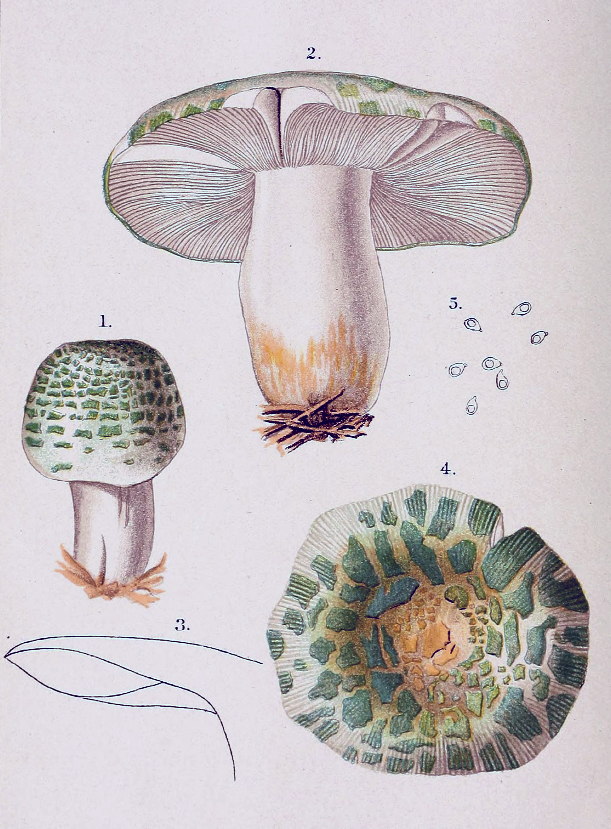
Krieger's illustration of Russula virescens, from Thomas Taylor's 1898 work Student's Hand-book of Mushrooms of America Edible and Poisonous

At the age of 18, Krieger started employment as an artist assistant in the Division of Microscopy at the Department of Agriculture, and spent time painting mushrooms found around the District of Columbia area. When the Secretary of Agriculture, Julius Sterling Morton, closed the department in 1895, Krieger spent a year in Munich at the Royal Bavarian Academy of Fine Arts. After returning to America in 1896, he became an instructor of drawing and painting at the Maryland Institute College of Art and Design. Although he developed a reputation as a portrait painter, Krieger did not particularly enjoy this employment, finding it dull.

In 1902, Krieger started working as a botanical illustrator for mycologist William Gilson Farlow at Harvard University, a position that lasted for the next decade. During this time, he earnestly immersed himself in his work, painting over 350 images of mushrooms. He also started indexing the world's mycological literature, a project that continued for the next 30 years.

In 1912, Krieger accepted a position at the United States Department of Agriculture, at the Plant Introduction Garden in Chico, California. Here, under the supervision of David Griffiths, he produced a series of images on species of the Opuntia cactus genus.

Krieger returned to illustrating mushrooms in 1918 when he returned to Baltimore to work for the noted gynecologist Howard A. Kelly, for whom he produced over 300 paintings of fungi. He also assisted Kelly in indexing his mycological library, which, with about 12,000 items and valued at $100,000, was considered one of the most extensive privately owned mycological libraries in the country. Kelly donated his library and fungus collections to the University of Michigan, where, according to Kelly's wishes, it was named the "L.C.C. Krieger Mycological Library".

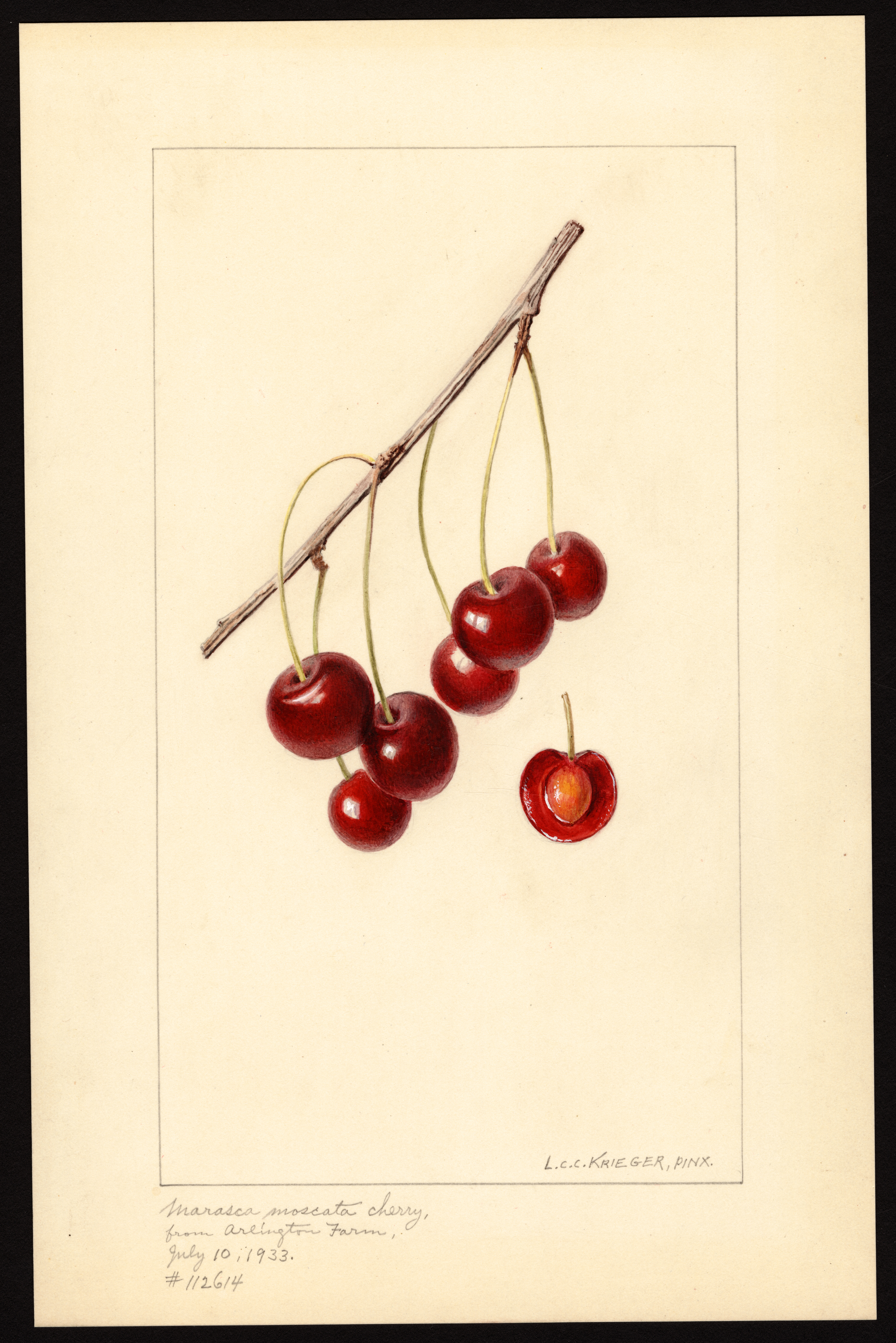
Watercolor of Marasca Moscata variety of cherry (Prunus avium) by Louis Charles Christopher Krieger, 1933.

Over the following 10 years, Krieger published several scientific articles that appeared in Mycologia and other journals, including the May 1920 National Geographic, which featured 16 of his colored plates.

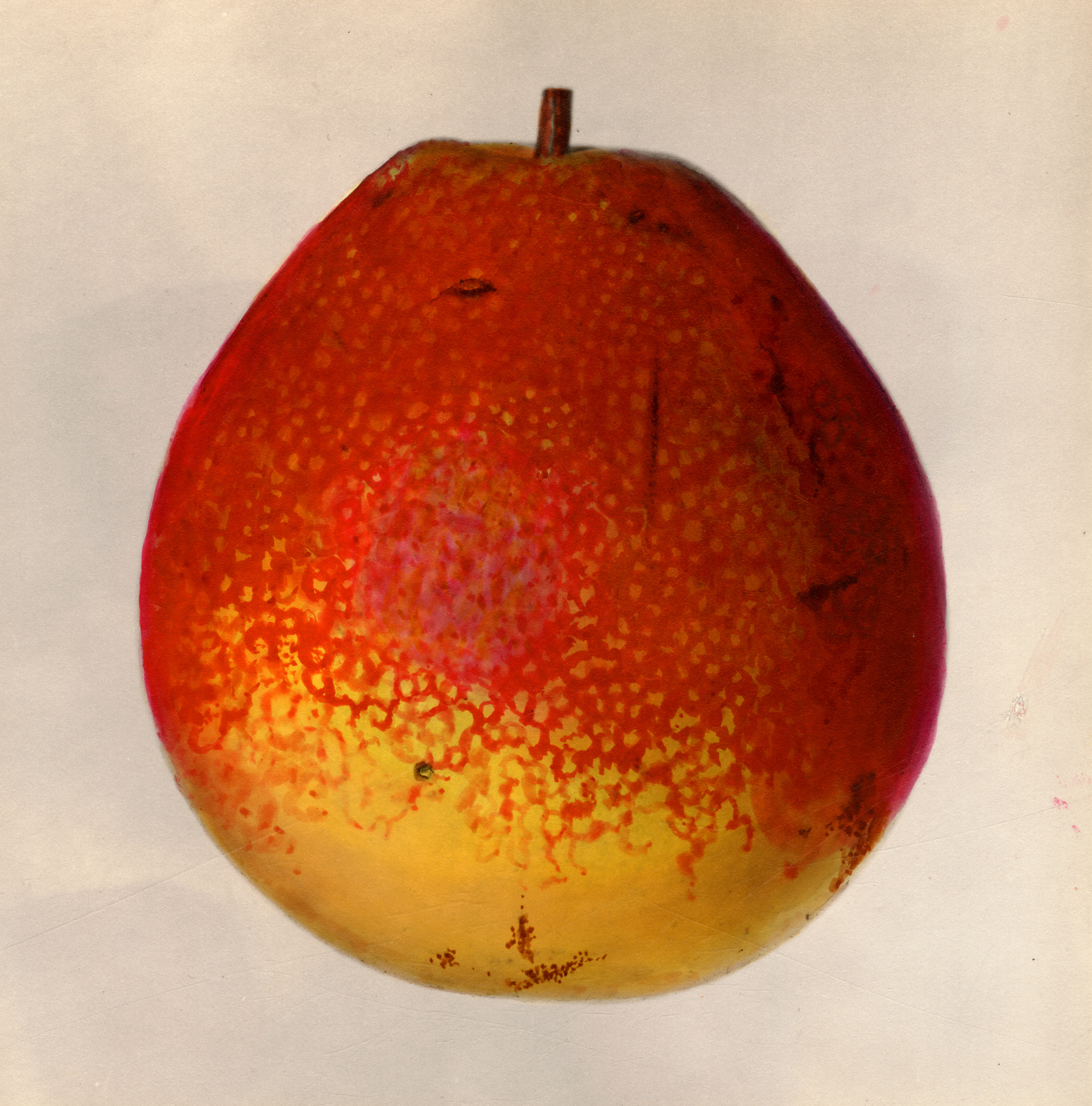
Flemish Beauty variety of pear (Pyrus communis) specimen originating in Hood River, Oregon from 1 November 1935 Pomological Watercolor

Krieger was an artist with the Tropical Plant Research Foundation in Cuba from 1928–29, where he illustrated sugarcane diseases for the USDA. He was briefly a mycologist with the New York State Museum, during which time he prepared the book A Popular Guide to the Higher Fungi (Mushrooms) of New York State, which was eventually published in 1935. In the 1930s, he painted some 80 watercolors of fruit for USDA, mainly apples, citrus, and stone fruit; these paintings are now in the National Agricultural Library's Pomological Watercolor Collection.

== Described taxa ==
Krieger described several species, varieties, and a form of agaric fungi in 1922 and 1927 publications.

- Agaricus auricolor L.Krieg. (illegitimate homonym; now Psalliota auricolor Coker)
- Amanita brunnescens var. pallida L.Krieg.
- Amanita corticelli (Valenti) L.Krieg.
- Amanita crassifoliata L.Krieg.
- Amanita porphyria var. lavendula (Coker) L.Krieg.
- Cortinarius rubroclavus L.Krieg.
- Hygrophorus proximus L.Krieg.
- Mycena inconspicua L.Krieg.
- Pluteus leoninus var. oculatus L.Krieg.
- Stropharia aeruginosa var. exsquamosa L.Krieg.
- Tricholoma sejunctum var. friesii L.Krieg.
- Tricholoma sejunctum var. rubroscabrum L.Krieg.
- Schizophyllum commune f. stipitatum L.Krieg.

== Selected publications ==
- Krieger LCC. (1911). "Note on the reputed poisonous properties of Coprinus comatus". Mycologia. 3 (4): 200–2. doi:10.2307/3753087. JSTOR 3753087.
- Krieger LCC. (1914). "Observations on the use of Ridgway's new color-book. The color of the spores of Volvaria speciosa Fr". Mycologia. 6 (1): 29–31. doi:10.2307/3753552. JSTOR 3753552.
- Krieger LCC. (1920). "Common mushrooms of the United States". The National Geographic Magazine. 37: 387–439.
- Krieger LCC. (1921). "Amanita pantherina edible or poisonous?". Mycologia. 13 (4–5): 270–1. JSTOR 3753214.
- Krieger LCC. (1922). "A sketch of the history of mycological illustration (higher fungi)". Mycologia. 14 (6): 311–31. doi:10.2307/3753080. JSTOR 3753080.
- Krieger LCC. (1923). "Preliminary note on the position of the hymenium in Physalacria inflata (Schw.) Peck". Bulletin of the Maryland Academy of Sciences. 3: 7–8.
- Krieger LCC. (1925). "Cortinarius cyanites in the United States". Rhodora. 27 (321): 153–6.
- Krieger LCC. (1926). "Sketching fleshy fungi with the aid of the camera lucida". Mycologia. 18 (3): 132–3. doi:10.2307/3753957. JSTOR 3753957.
- Krieger LCC. (1936). The Mushroom Handbook. New York: Macmillan.
- Krieger LCC. (1938–39). "Unpublished color plates of fungi by Lewis David von Schweinitz". Bartonia. 11 (20): 28–9.
