= Elsie Lower Pomeroy =

American painter

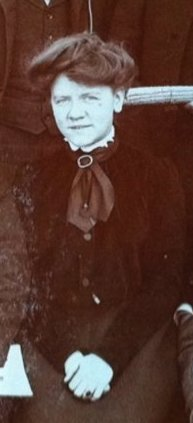
- Born: Elsie E. Lower; September 30, 1882; New Castle, Pennsylvania
- Died: 1971 (aged 88–89); Mill Valley, California
- Education: Corcoran School of Art
- Known for: Oil painting, watercolor, botanical illustrations
- Movement: American Scene Painting

Elsie Lower Pomeroy (1882–1971) was an artist most closely associated with the American Scene Painting movement and specifically California Regionalism or California Scene Painting. She was also one of a small group of botanical illustrators who worked for the United States Department of Agriculture (USDA) in the early 20th century.

== Early life and education ==
Elsie E. Lower was born September 30, 1882, in New Castle, Pennsylvania. She was the daughter of Cyrus B. Lower, a decorated Union Army American Civil War veteran and Medal of Honor recipient. She grew up in Washington, D.C., and graduated from the Corcoran School of Art in the early 1900s.

== USDA illustrator ==
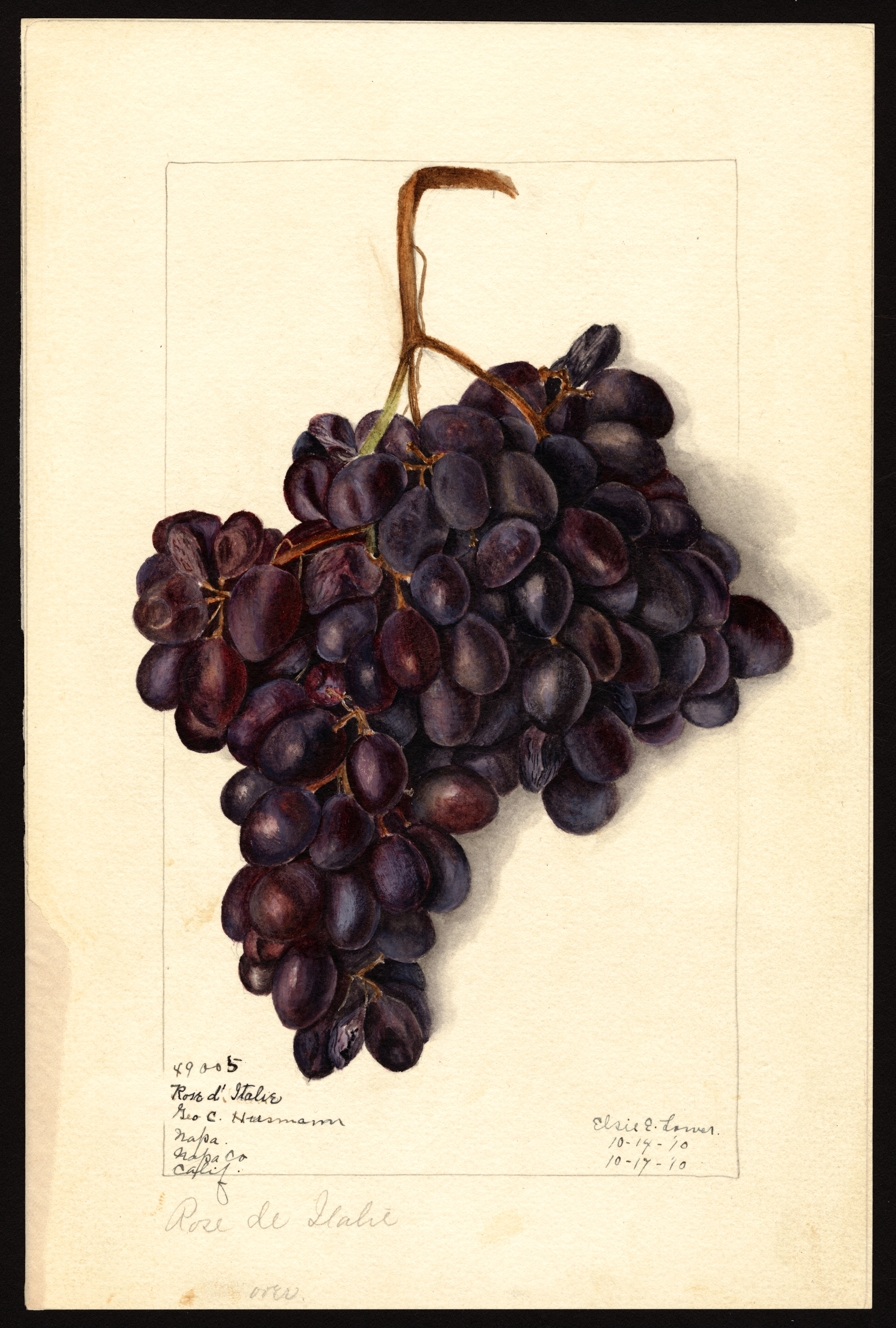
Lower's watercolor of the Rose d'Italie grape, created for the USDA

By 1908, she was working as an artist for the USDA, drawing botanical illustrations for the USDA yearbooks. She was one of a select cohort of botanical illustrators working for the USDA at this time, among whom were also Deborah Griscom Passmore, Ellen Isham Schutt, Royal Charles Steadman, and Amanda Newton. She painted over 280 watercolors for the USDA, including both common fruits such as citrus, apples, and strawberries, and less common fruits such as cherimoyas. The 1908 USDA yearbook contained two of her images, including the Augbert peach (pg. 479) and Kawakami and Lonestar persimmons (pg. 484). The 1909 USDA yearbook contained two of her images, including an ear of corn (pg. 335) and the Diploma currant (pg. 414). Unlike most of her USDA colleagues, she would go on to have a career as an exhibiting artist after she left the service.

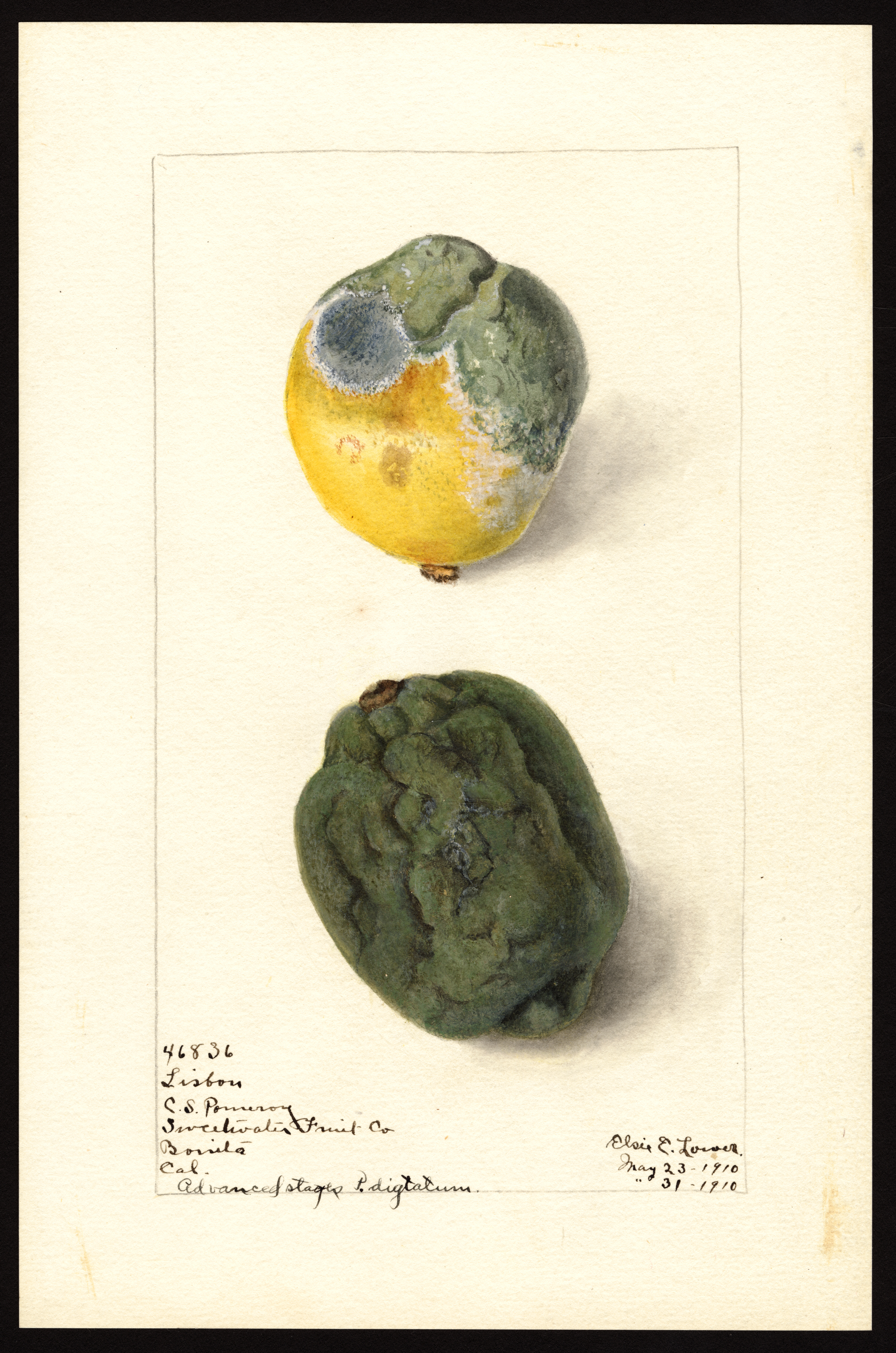
Lower's watercolor of diseased Eureka lemon (Citrus limon)

In 1911, she married Carl Stone Pomeroy, a young pomologist at the USDA. By 1913, the couple had moved to Riverside, California, where Carl joined the Citrus Experiment Station and helped to develop the navel orange/citrus industry in Southern California.

== California painter ==
While in Riverside, she began studies and friendships with Millard Sheets, Phil Dike, and Eliot O'Hara, and was a member of the Riverside Art Association. During this time, she completed a series of four watercolors about the citrus industry in Riverside. These paintings were exhibited throughout the United States, won numerous awards, and are currently in the permanent collection at the University of California at Riverside. In 1935, she went to Washington, D.C., where she was employed as a botanical artist for several months by the U.S. Forestry Service. It was during this trip that she did studies for her painting Melting Snow, which is now in the collection of the Butler Institute of American Art in Ohio.

In the mid-1940s Elsie and Carl moved to Mill Valley in Marin County, California. An ardent nature lover, Elsie traveled throughout the state capturing the California scene. Her subjects included everything from Death Valley and coastal scenes to the Spanish missions and San Francisco cityscapes. She maintained her close ties with other California Scene painters such as Sheets, Rex Brandt, Milford Zornes, Emil Kosa, Jr. and Phil Paradise. Even in her early 80s she was painting and traveling with Sheets to San Miguel de Allende, Mexico.

Elsie lived in Marin County to the end of her life and was a member of the Marin Society of Artists. She died in 1971 in Mill Valley, California, leaving behind hundreds of watercolors, oils, and drawings. Her USDA watercolors are now part of the USDA Pomological Watercolor Collection.

Although not as well known as her male contemporaries, her work exemplifies the California Scene Painting movement from the 1920s-50s period. Her primary mediums were watercolor and oil, but she also did drawings and used tempera.

Special awards and exhibitions include "Two Hundred American Watercolors," National Gallery of Art, Washington D.C., 1941; 1st Watercolor Prize from the Butler Art Institute, Ohio, 1942; Honorable Mention, California Watercolor Society, Los Angeles Museum of Art, 1939; International Exhibition of Watercolors, Art Institute of Chicago, 1938 & 1939; Honorable Mention, San Francisco Women Artists, San Francisco Museum of Art, 1966.
