= Amanda Newton (illustrator) =

American botanical illustrator

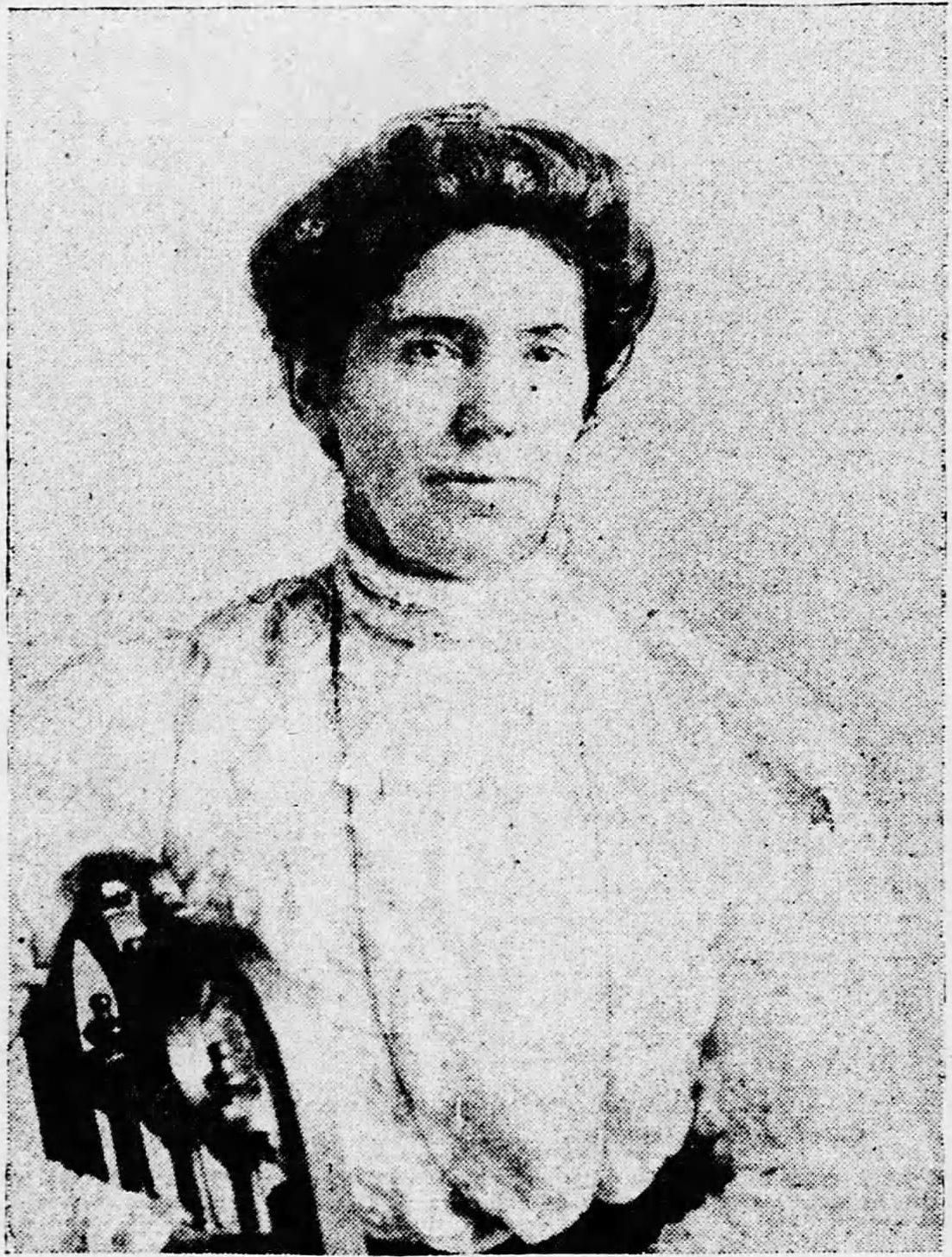
- Born: 1858; Pennsylvania
- Died: 1943 (aged 84–85); Washington, D.C.
- Occupation: Artist

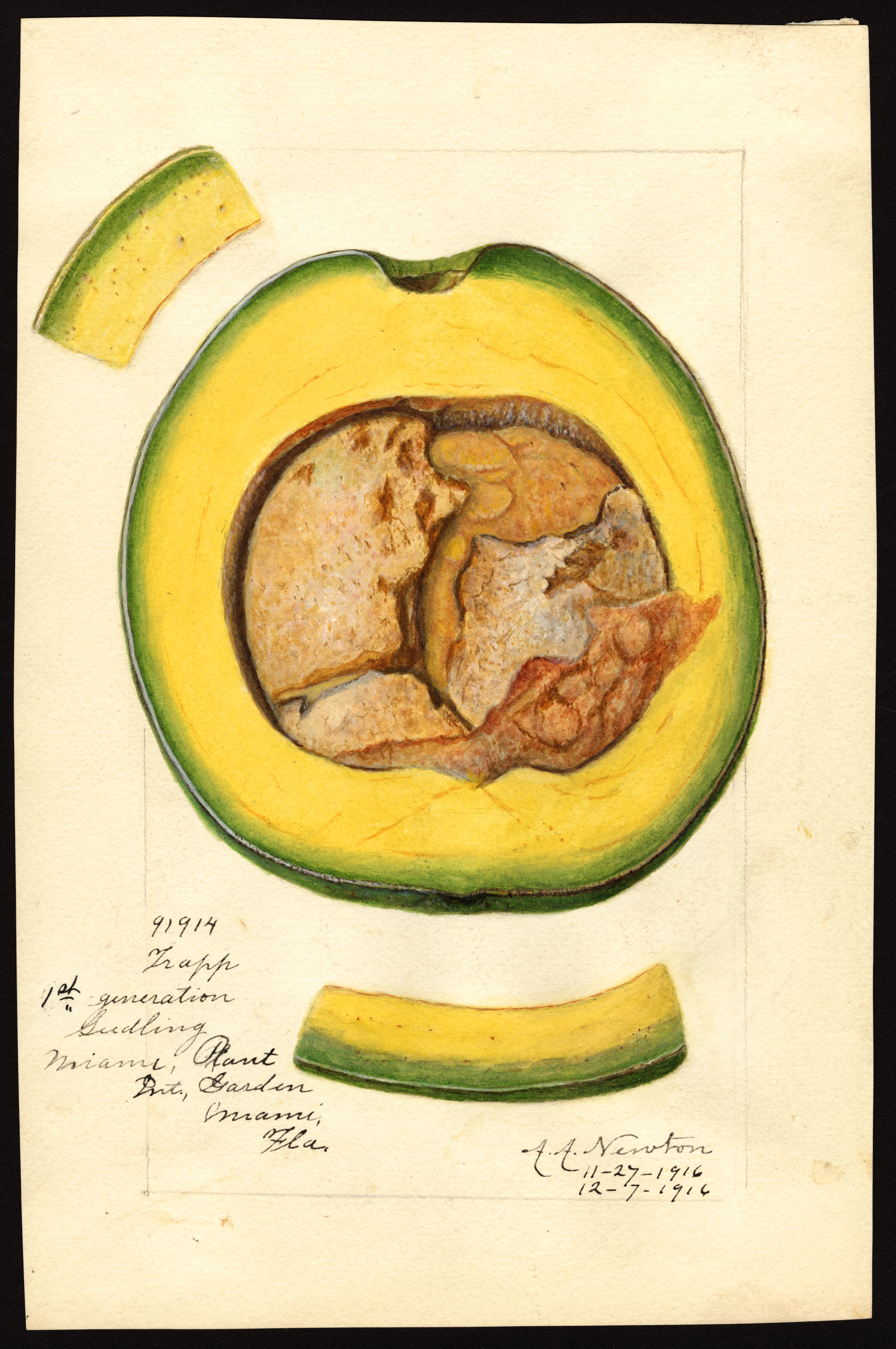
Trapp variety of avocado (Persea species), with specimen originating in Miami, Florida; watercolor by Amanda Newton, 1916.

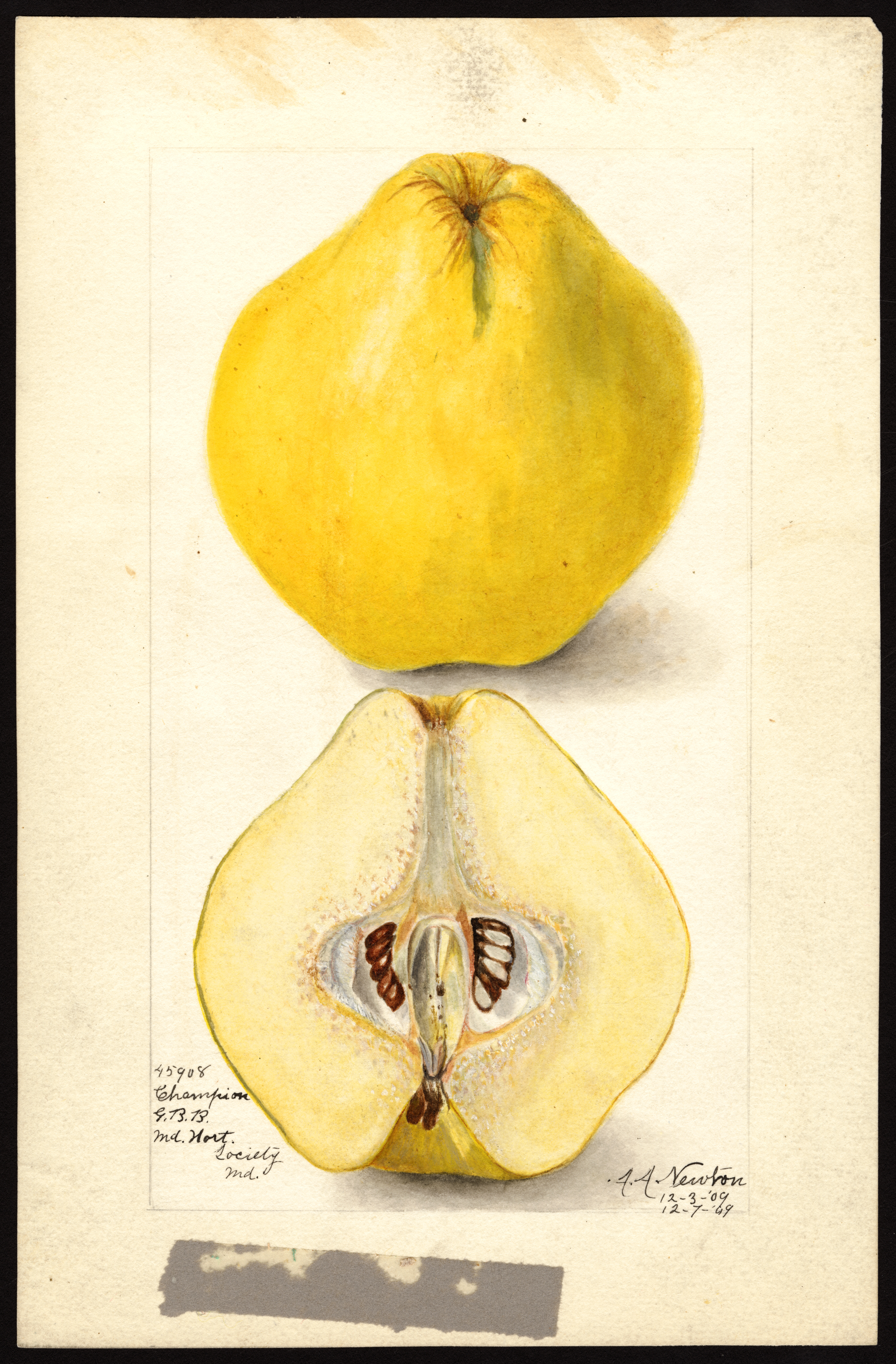
Champion quince (Cydonia oblonga); watercolor by Amanda Newton, 1909.

Amanda Almira Newton (c. 1860–1943) was a botanical illustrator for the U.S. Department of Agriculture (USDA) who specialized in watercolors of fruit. Her work is now preserved in the USDA's Pomological Watercolor Collection, and she is the second-most prolific contributor to that archive of 7600 paintings, with her work representing roughly one-sixth of the total.

== Early life and education ==
Amanda Almira Newton was born around 1860. She was the granddaughter of Isaac Newton, the first commissioner of the USDA, who died when she was a child; later in life, her colleague at the USDA, Royal Charles Steadman, would paint a portrait of her grandfather for her.

== Career ==
Newton worked for the USDA from 1896 to 1928. This was a time when the major fruit-producing regions in the United States were just beginning to emerge, as farmers worked with the USDA to establish orchards for expanding markets. Photography was not yet in widespread use as a documentary medium, so the government relied on artists like Newton to produce technically accurate drawings for its publications. Newton was one of more than 50 skilled botanical illustrators hired in this early period—among whom were Elsie Lower, Ellen Isham Schutt, Royal Charles Steadman, and Deborah Griscom Passmore—and she was one of the most productive, turning out more than 1200 finished watercolors for the USDA.

Newton's artwork for the USDA covered a wide range of fruit and nuts, principally apples, of which there are many hundreds of examples. There are also paintings of strawberries, plums, citrus, persimmons, avocados, and cherries, as well as fruits that are still not commonly grown in the continental United States such as loquat and baobab. Most of her watercolors show a whole and a half fruit in full color; a few (such as the strawberry and cherry paintings) show foliage as well. Her style is precise and detailed, combining vigorous lines with subtle color modulations. Newton signed her work 'A.A. Newton'.

In addition, beginning in 1896, Newton made wax models of some 300 specimens of fruits being grown or tested in the United States. She inaugurated production of these wax models for the USDA and later showed some of them at the Tennessee Centennial Exposition and the 1904 Louisiana Purchase Exposition. For the latter exposition, she created some models showing how environmental conditions, cultivation practices, and storage conditions affect the fruit's condition and keeping qualities.

Newton's original paintings are now in the USDA National Agricultural Library's Pomological Watercolor Collection.
