= Helen Wood =

Helen Wood may refer to:

- Helen Wood (judge), Australian judge
- Helen Wood (television personality) (born 1986), Big Brother contestant
- Helen Adelaide Wood (1860–1927), British botanical artist and scientific illustrator
- Helen Wood (actress) (1917–1988), American actress
- Helen M. Wood, American computer scientist

== See also ==
- Helen Atkinson-Wood (born 1955), English actress and comedian
- Helen Woods (disambiguation)
- Ellen Wood (disambiguation)
