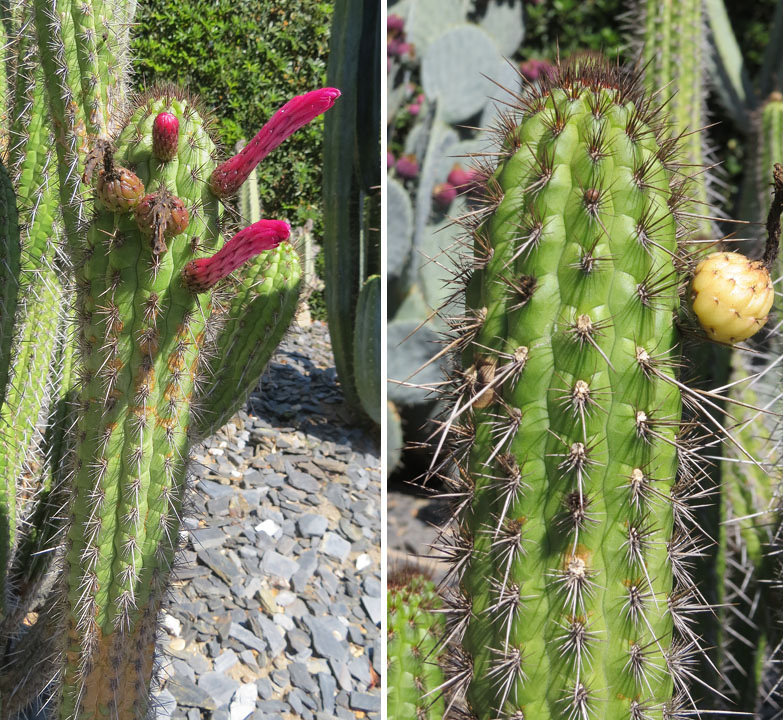

Scientific classification
- Kingdom: Plantae
- Clade: Tracheophytes
- Clade: Angiosperms
- Clade: Eudicots
- Order: Caryophyllales
- Family: Cactaceae
- Subfamily: Cactoideae
- Genus: Borzicactus
- Species: B. plagiostoma

Binomial name
- Borzicactus plagiostoma (Vaupel) Britton & Rose

Synonyms
- Borzicactus fieldianus subsp. samnensis (F.Ritter) Ostolaza; Borzicactus purpureus F.Ritter; Borzicactus samnensis F.Ritter; Cereus plagiostoma Vaupel (basionym); Cleistocactus fieldianus subsp. samnensis (F.Ritter) Ostolaza; Cleistocactus plagiostoma (Vaupel) D.R.Hunt; Clistanthocereus samnensis (F.Ritter) Backeb.; Echinopsis plagiostoma (Vaupel) Molinari & Mayta

= Borzicactus plagiostoma =

Species of cactus

Borzicactus plagiostoma is a species of succulent flowering plant in the genus Borzicactus, within the family Cactaceae. It is endemic to Peru.

== Description ==
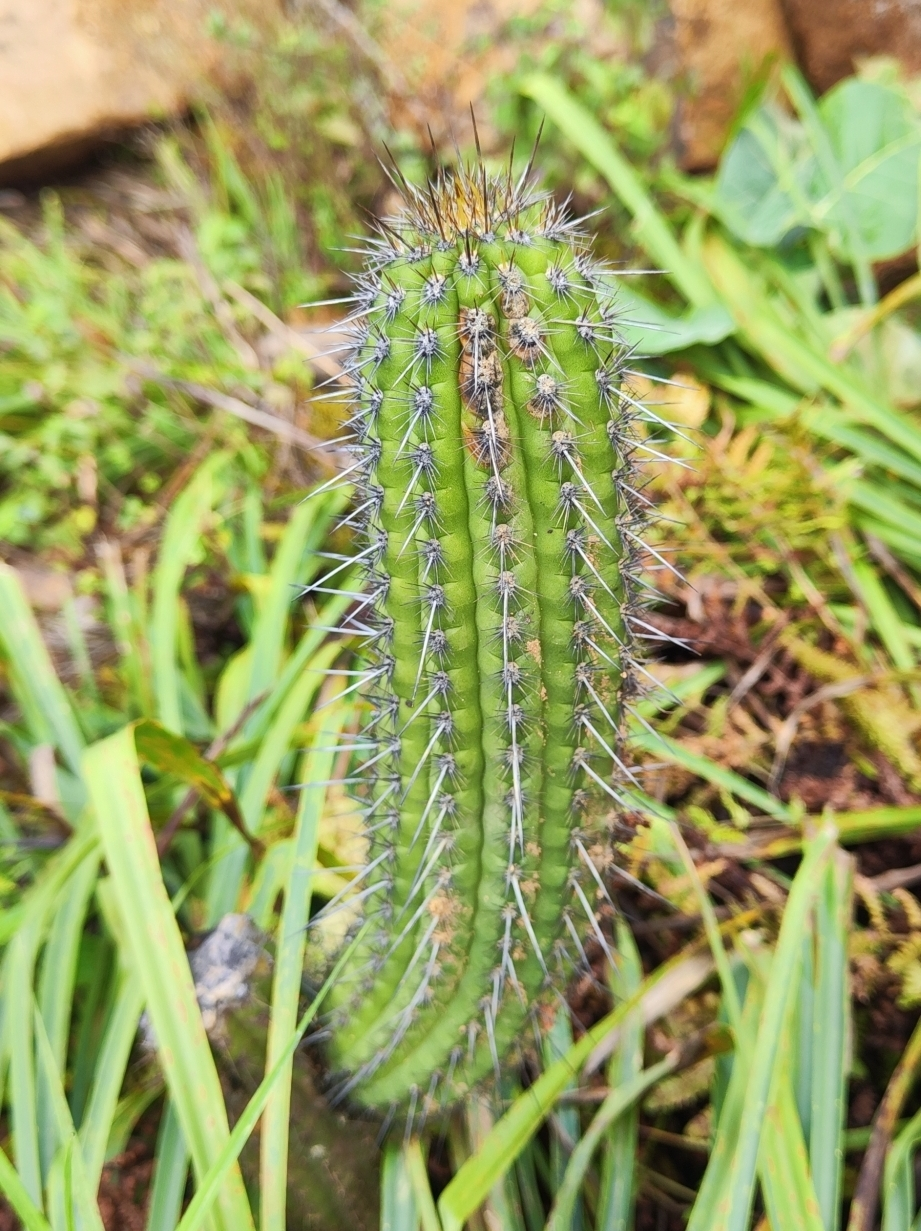
Plant in habitat

Borzicactus plagiostoma is a species of cactus with a shrubby growth form, with vertical to ascendent stems that are branched at the base. They can reach 1.5 m in height and 5-7 cm in diameter.

There are 10-15 short, wavy ribs, which are divided into tubercles by grooves. Upon the tubercles are the areoles, which are situated very closely together and have straight spines which are black in color. Among these are 1-5 central spines measuring 1-3 cm in length and 12-16 marginal spines measuring 4-7 mm in length.

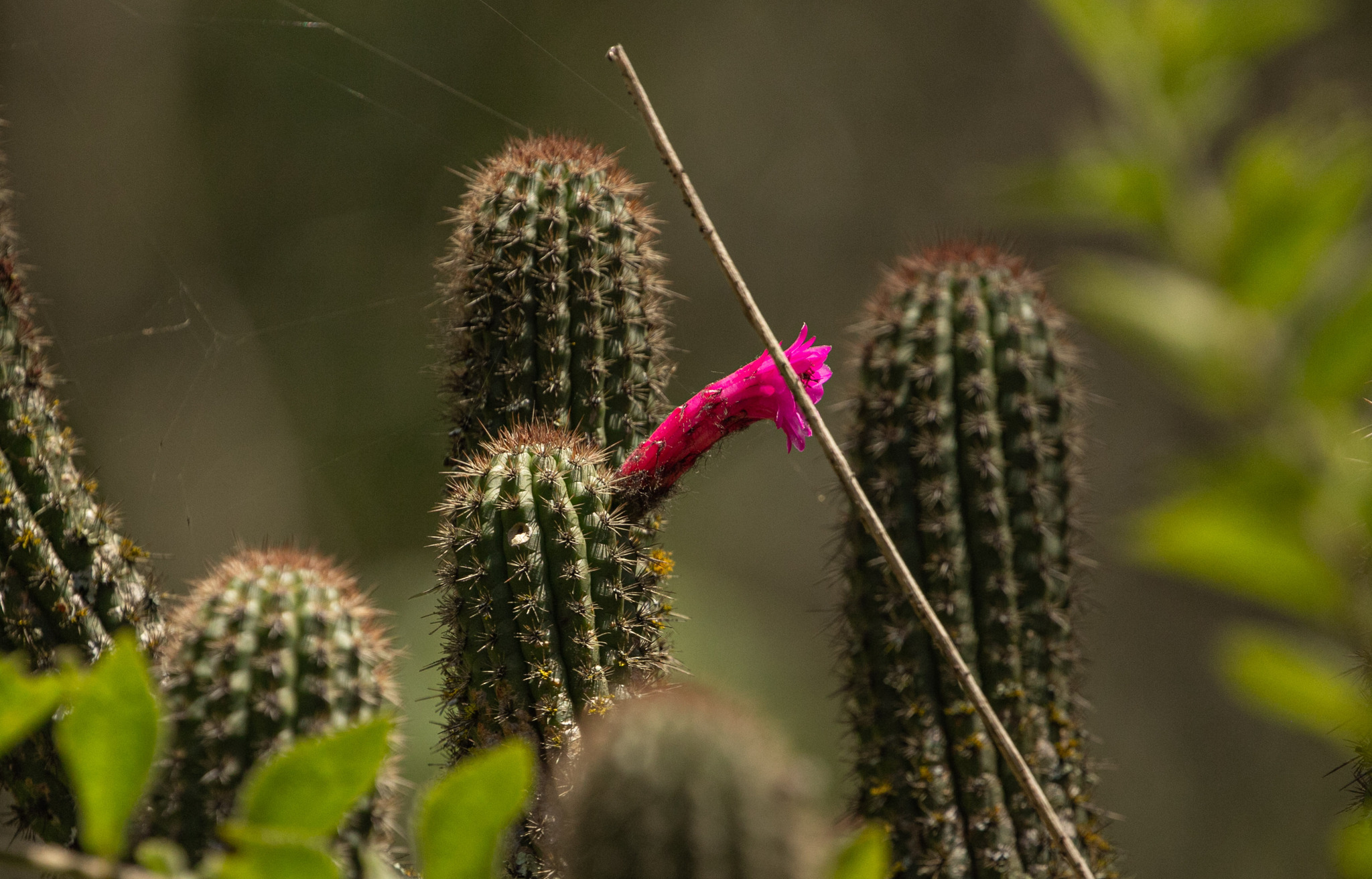
Plant in flower

The flowers are tubular with crooked edges, and are an intense purple or magenta color. They are somewhat bilaterally symmetrical and measure up to 8 cm in length.

== Distribution and habitat ==
This species is native to northwestern Peru, where it grows primarily in desert or dry scrubland biomes at altitudes between 2000 and 2200 meters above sea level.

== Taxonomy ==
Borzicactus plagiostoma was first described as Cereus plagiostoma, a name published in 1913 by the German botanist Friedrich Karl Johann Vaupel in the scientific journal Botanische Jahrbücher für Systematik, Pflanzengeschichte und Pflanzengeographie 111: 20.

Later, the American botanists Nathaniel Lord Britton and Joseph Nelson Rose transferred this species to the genus Borzicactus, renaming it Borzicactus plagiostoma. They registered these changes in their book The Cactaceae; descriptions and illustrations of plants of the cactus family 2: 163, published in 1920.

Etymology

- Borzicactus: The genus name is derived from "Borzi" (honoring the Italian botanist Antonino Borzì (1852-1921), director del jardín botánico de Palermo) and the Greek term kaktos (meaning "thistle" or "spiny plant"), in reference to the spiny character of the species in this genus.
- plagiostoma: The specific epithet is derived from the Greek words plagios (meaning "crooked") and stoma (meaning "mouth"), in reference to the floral morphology of this species.

== Cultivation ==
This species is cultivated mainly as an ornamental. It may be propagated vegetatively via cuttings, or via seed.
