= Zanthoxylum negrilense =

Conservation status
- Endangered (IUCN 2.3)

Scientific classification
- Kingdom: Plantae
- Clade: Tracheophytes
- Clade: Angiosperms
- Clade: Eudicots
- Clade: Rosids
- Order: Sapindales
- Family: Rutaceae
- Genus: Zanthoxylum
- Species: Z. negrilense

Binomial name
- Zanthoxylum negrilense Fawc. & Rendle

Species of flowering plant

Zanthoxylum negrilense is a species of plant in the family Rutaceae. It is endemic to Jamaica.
