= Ravenia swartziana =

Conservation status
- Data Deficient (IUCN 3.1)

Scientific classification
- Kingdom: Plantae
- Clade: Tracheophytes
- Clade: Angiosperms
- Clade: Eudicots
- Clade: Rosids
- Order: Sapindales
- Family: Rutaceae
- Genus: Ravenia
- Species: R. swartziana

Binomial name
- Ravenia swartziana (Miers) Fawc. & Rendle

Synonyms
- Homotypic Synonyms: Pomphidea swartziana Miers

Species of flowering plant

Ravenia swartziana is a species of flowering plants belonging to the citrus family, Rutaceae. It is endemic to Jamaica, where it is known only from the type specimen collected early in the 20th century.
