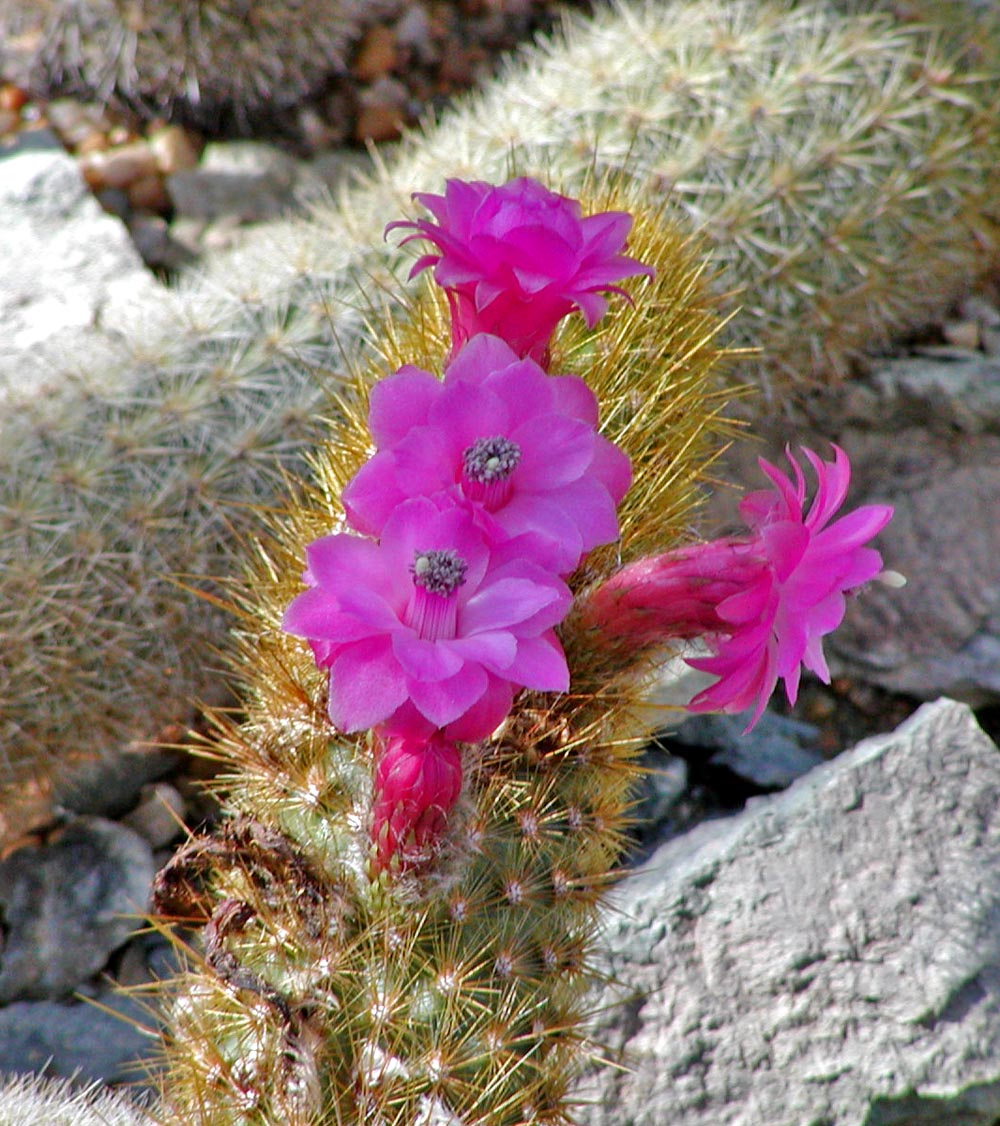
- Borzicactus icosagonus

Scientific classification
- Kingdom: Plantae
- Clade: Tracheophytes
- Clade: Angiosperms
- Clade: Eudicots
- Order: Caryophyllales
- Family: Cactaceae
- Subfamily: Cactoideae
- Tribe: Cereeae
- Subtribe: Trichocereinae
- Genus: Borzicactus; Riccob.

Type species
- Borzicactus sepium

Species
- See text.

Synonyms
- Borzicereus Frič & Kreuz.; Seticereus Backeb.

= Borzicactus =

Genus of cacti

Borzicactus is a genus of cacti native to Colombia, Ecuador, and Peru.

== Description ==
Plants in this genus are small to medium-sized cacti with cylindrical or tubular stems that can grow alone or in clusters. They can reach up to 30 cm in height and 6 cm in diameter and are typically bluish-green. Their stems are often covered with spirally arranged spines of varying lengths and colors. Some species have twisted or coiled stems, while others have a single or branched growth habit. The flowers are generally large and colorful, in shades of pink, red, yellow, white, or orange. They bloom mainly in summer, lasting several days, opening during the day and attracting insect pollinators. The fruit is a small, spherical berry filled with numerous seeds.

These plants are popular among cactus collectors for their beauty and adaptability to different growing conditions. However, they require specific care regarding watering and light to thrive.A notable feature of Borzicactus is its ability to easily hybridize with other cactus genera such as Echinopsis and Lobivia, due to their close evolutionary relationship. This hybridization has resulted in many new hybrids that combine traits from both parent plants.

== Taxonomy ==
The genus was described by the Italian botanist Vincenzo Riccobono in 1909. This species is named after Antonino Borzì, Curator of the Botanical Gardens in Palermo, Italy at 20th century.

== Species ==
As of October 2023, Plants of the World Online accepted the following species:

image	Scientific name	Distribution
	Borzicactus fieldianus Britton & Rose	Peru (Amazonas, Ancash, Huanuco, Junin, Lima, Pasco, San Martin, Ucayali)
	Borzicactus hutchisonii G.J.Charles	Peru.
	Borzicactus icosagonus (Kunth) Britton & Rose	Ecuador, Peru
	Borzicactus leonensis (Madsen) G.J.Charles	Ecuador
	Borzicactus longiserpens (Leuenb.) G.J.Charles	Peru
	Borzicactus neoroezlii F.Ritter	Peru (Piura)
	Borzicactus plagiostoma (Vaupel) Britton & Rose	Peru
	Borzicactus sepium (Kunth) Britton & Rose	Ecuador
	Borzicactus silvaticus Janke	Peru
	Borzicactus tenuiserpens (Rauh & Backeb.) Kimnach	Peru
