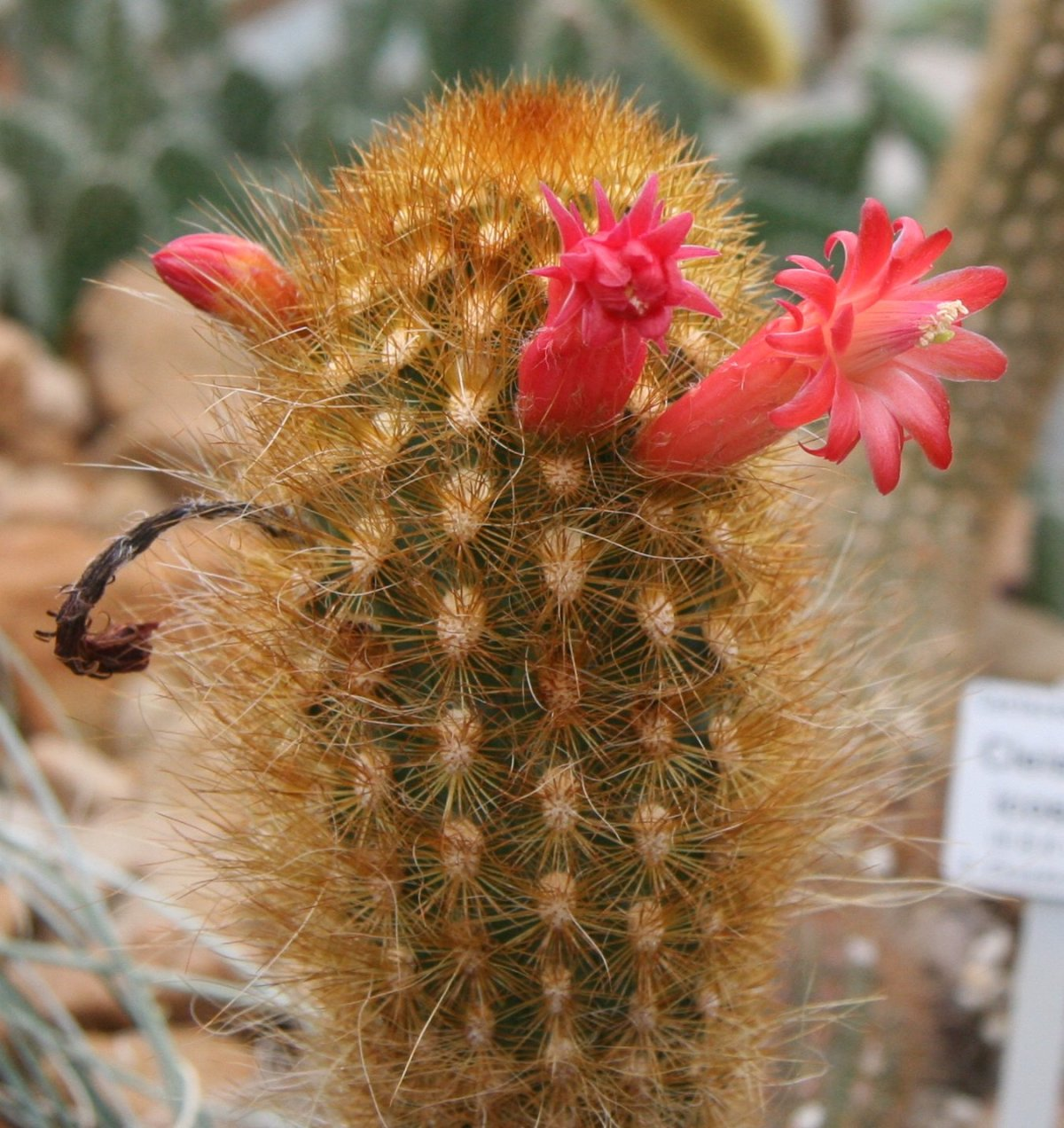

Conservation status
- Least Concern (IUCN 3.1)

Scientific classification
- Kingdom: Plantae
- Clade: Embryophytes
- Clade: Tracheophytes
- Clade: Spermatophytes
- Clade: Angiosperms
- Clade: Eudicots
- Order: Caryophyllales
- Family: Cactaceae
- Subfamily: Cactoideae
- Genus: Borzicactus
- Species: B. icosagonus

Binomial name
- Borzicactus icosagonus (Kunth) Britton & Rose

Synonyms
- Binghamia icosagona (Kunth) Backeb. 1936; Cactus icosagonus Kunth 1823; Cereus icosagonus (Kunth) DC. 1828; Cleistocactus icosagonus (Kunth) F.A.C.Weber 1904; Matucana icosagona (Kunth) Buxb. 1973; Seticereus icosagonus (Kunth) Backeb. 1937

= Borzicactus icosagonus =

Species of cactus

Borzicactus icosagonus is a species of cacti found in Ecuador and Peru.

== Description ==
Borzicactus icosagonus grows as a shrub with prostrate to creeping or ascending shoots and forms large, low piles. The light green shoots reach a length of 20 to 60 centimeters with diameters of 3 to 5 centimeters. There are 8 to 21 low, rounded ribs, which are divided into cusps by furrows. The areoles on it are close together. Areoles capable of flowering are covered with numerous, fine, long bristles. The 25 to 60 golden yellow thorns are needle-like or bristly and 1 to 1.5 centimeters long.

The almost straight, crooked-edged, pink to scarlet to orange flowers are 7 to 8 centimeters long. Their pericarpel is covered with small scales with a few hairs. The spherical, green to yellow fruits reach a diameter of 2 to 4 centimeters and are often covered with a few hairs.

=== Subspecies ===
Accepted subspecies:

Image	Name	Distribution
	Borzicactus icosagonus subsp. humboldtii (Kunth) G.J.Charles	Peru.
	Borzicactus icosagonus subsp. icosagonus	Ecuador to Peru
	Borzicactus icosagonus subsp. roseiflorus (Buining) G.J.Charles	Ecuador

== Distribution ==
Borzicactus icosagonus is widespread in the Ecuadorian provinces of Azuay and Loja and in the Peruvian Piura region at altitudes of 1000 to 3000 meters.

== Taxonomy ==
The first description as Cactus icosagonus was made in 1823 by Karl Sigismund Kunth. The specific epithet icosagonus is derived from the Greek words eikosi for 'twenty' and gonia for 'edge' and refers to the originally observed number of ribs of the species. Nathaniel Lord Britton and Joseph Nelson Rose placed the species in the genus Borzicactus in 1920. Further nomenclature synonyms are Cereus icosagonus (Kunth) DC. (1828), Cleistocactus icosagonus (Kunth) F.A.C.Weber (1904), Binghamia icosagona (Kunth) Backeb. (1936), Seticereus icosagonus (Kunth) Backeb. (1937) and Matucana icosagona (Kunth) Buxb. (1973).
