= Mary Emily Eaton =

British botanical illustrator

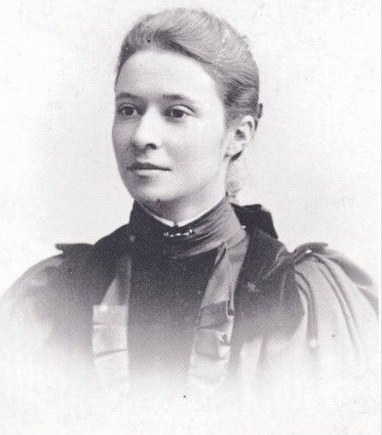
- Born: 27 November 1873; Coleford, Gloucestershire, U.K.
- Died: 4 August 1961 (aged 87); Cossington, Somerset, U.K.
- Known for: Botanical art
- Awards: Grenfell Medal, Royal Horticultural Society (twice)

Mary Emily Eaton (27 November 1873 – 4 August 1961) was an English botanical artist best known for illustrating Britton & Rose's The Cactaceae, published between 1919 and 1923.

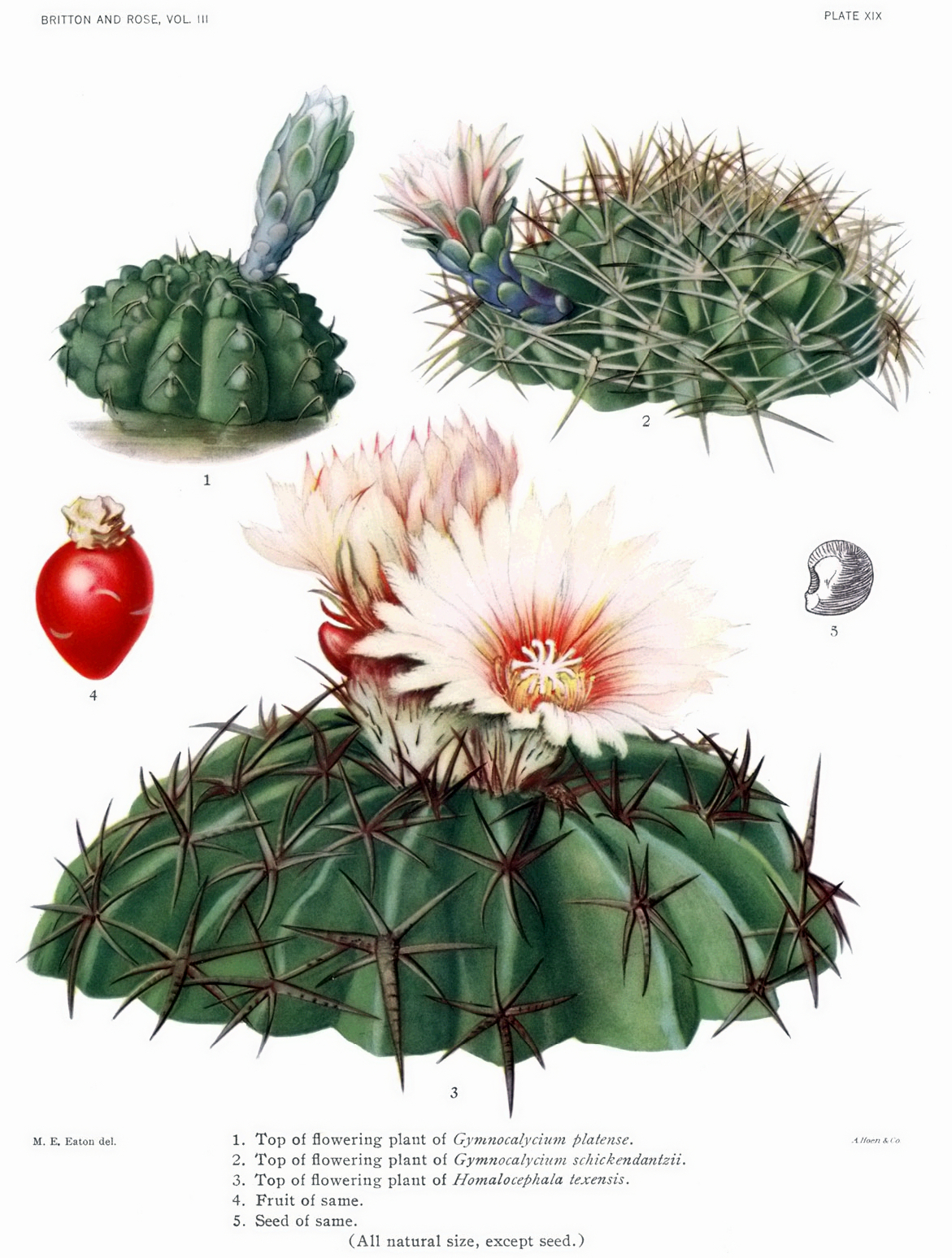
Plate XIX from The Cactaceae

== Life ==
Mary Emily Eaton was born on 27 November 1873 in Coleford, Gloucestershire. She attended private schools in London and received formal tuition in art at the Taunton School of Art, also attending classes at the Royal College of Art in South Kensington, and the Chelsea Polytechnic.

She worked for a time as a painter of Worcester porcelain, before going to Jamaica in 1909 to visit her siblings. During her two-years stay, she began painting detailed studies of butterflies and moths.

In June 1911 Eaton left for New York City, where she would remain until January 1932, employed by The New York Botanical Garden. Among other duties, she was the principal illustrator for the Botanical Garden's journal Addisonia, painting over three-quarters of the 800 plates. She was the principal illustrator for Britton & Rose's monumental work The Cactaceae, and her illustrations also appeared in the National Geographic Magazine. Contemporary authorities rated her work very highly, one source calling her "the greatest of living wildflower painters" and another stating that one could not fully appreciate her talent from the sometimes mediocre reproductions of her work in Addisonia and other publications.

She was awarded the silver-gilt Grenfell Medal of the Royal Horticultural Society twice, first in 1922 and again in 1950.

In 1932, due to the Great Depression, Eaton lost her position at the Botanic Garden, after which she struggled to find enough work in America. In 1947, she returned to England, where she died on 4 August 1961 in Cossington, Somerset. Many of her paintings are at the British Museum of Natural History. The Hunt Institute for Botanical Documentation also has a number of her works. Over six hundred of her watercolours are part of the permanent collections of the National Geographic Society, The New York Botanical Garden and the Smithsonian Institution.

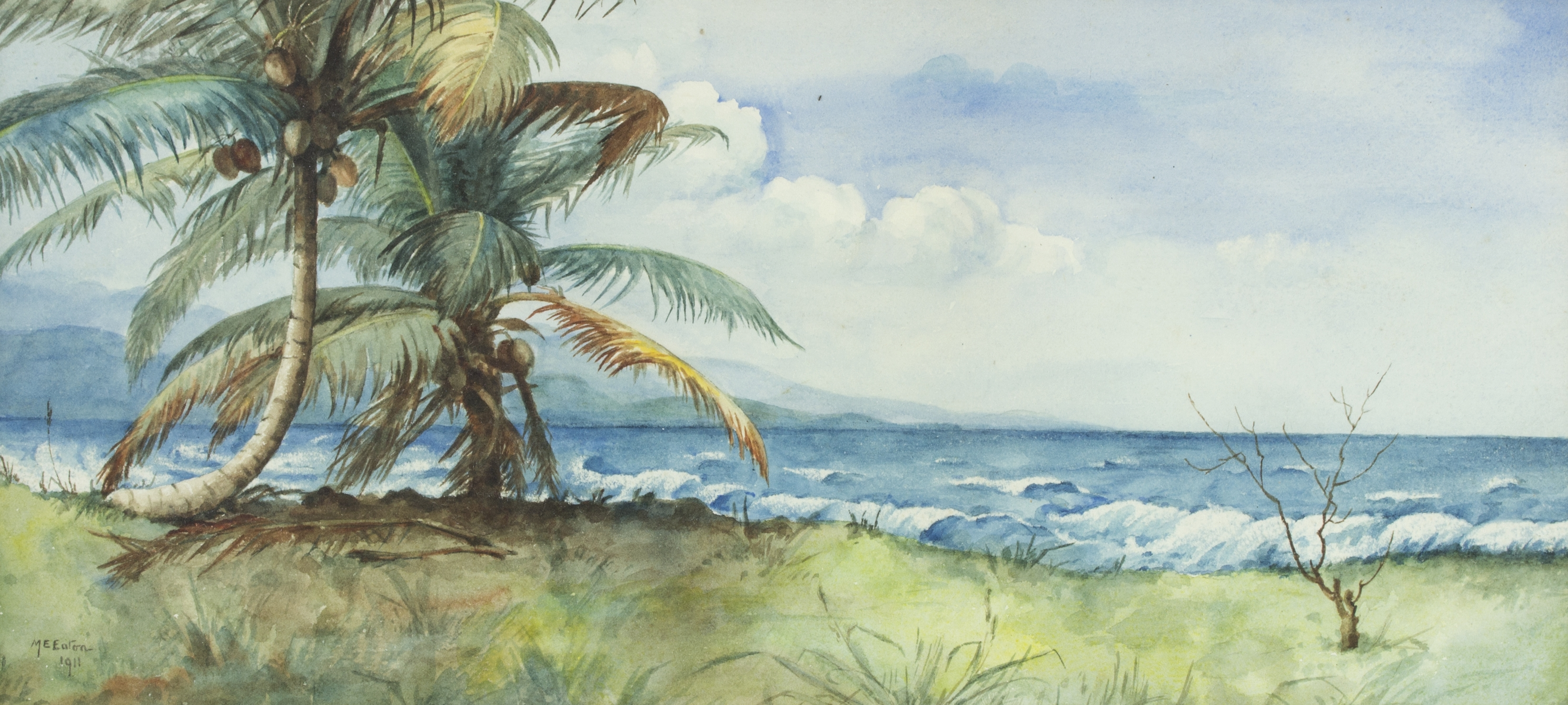
'Jamaican Shoreline' (1911)
