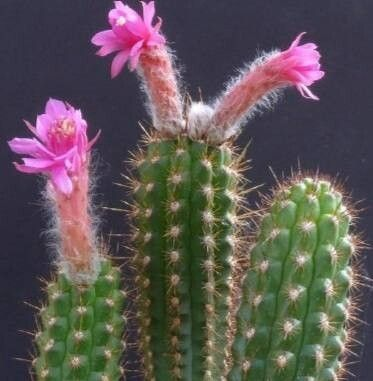

Scientific classification
- Kingdom: Plantae
- Clade: Tracheophytes
- Clade: Angiosperms
- Clade: Eudicots
- Order: Caryophyllales
- Family: Cactaceae
- Subfamily: Cactoideae
- Genus: Borzicactus
- Species: B. hutchisonii

Binomial name
- Borzicactus hutchisonii G.J.Charles 2010

= Borzicactus hutchisonii =

Species of cactus

Borzicactus hutchisonii is a species of Borzicactus found in Peru.
