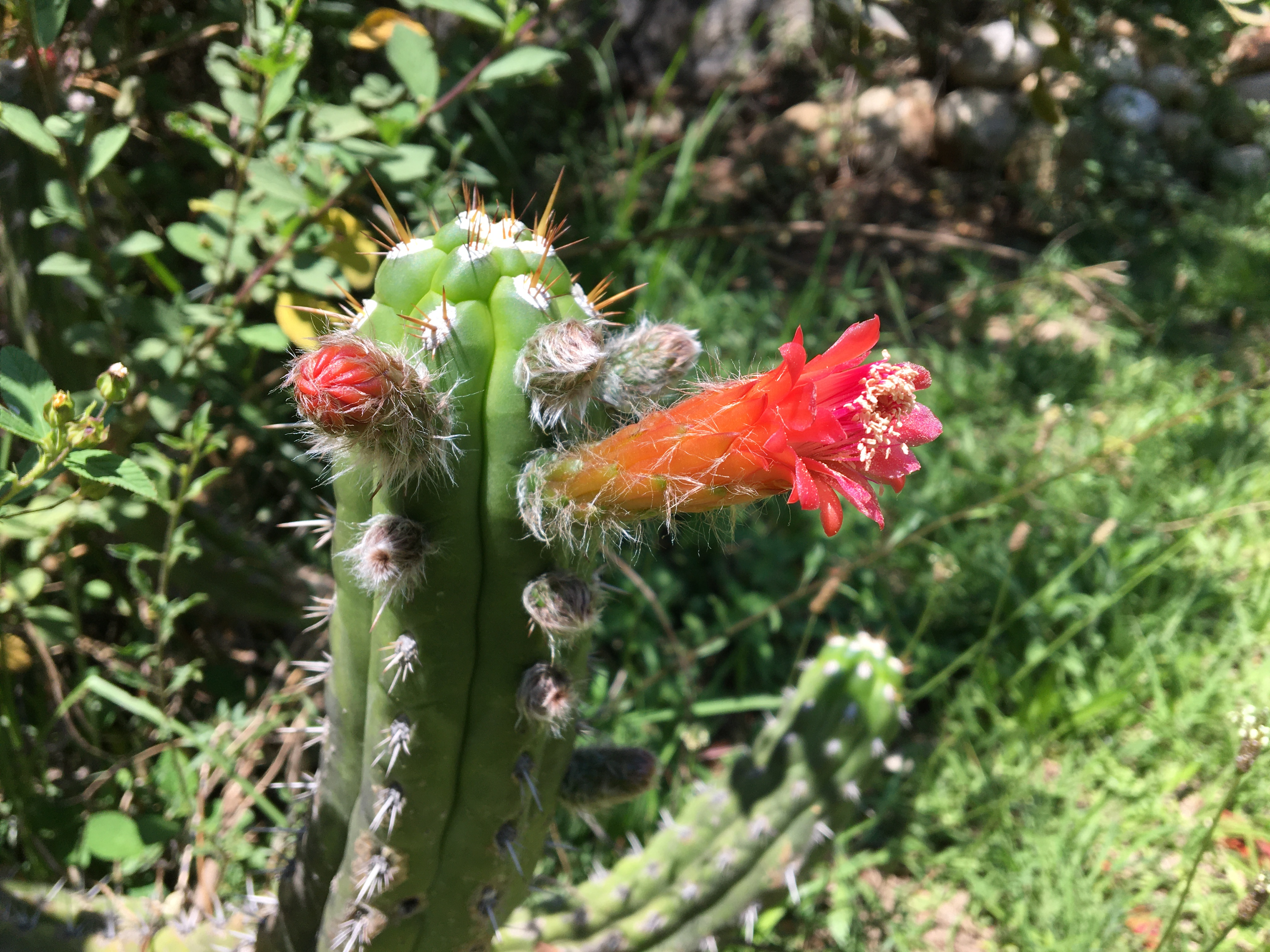

Conservation status
- Least Concern (IUCN 3.1)

Scientific classification
- Kingdom: Plantae
- Clade: Embryophytes
- Clade: Tracheophytes
- Clade: Spermatophytes
- Clade: Angiosperms
- Clade: Eudicots
- Order: Caryophyllales
- Family: Cactaceae
- Subfamily: Cactoideae
- Genus: Borzicactus
- Species: B. fieldianus

Binomial name
- Borzicactus fieldianus Britton & Rose 1923

Synonyms
- Cleistocactus fieldianus (Britton & Rose) D.R.Hunt 1987; Clistanthocereus fieldianus (Britton & Rose) Backeb. 1937; Echinopsis fieldiana (Britton & Rose) Molinari 2015

= Borzicactus fieldianus =

Species of cactus

Borzicactus fieldianus is a species of Borzicactus found in Peru.

== Subspecies ==
Accepted subspecies:

Image	Subspecies	Distribution
	Borzicactus fieldianus subsp. cajamarcensis (F.Ritter) Lodé	Peru.
	Borzicactus fieldianus subsp. fieldianus	Peru.
	Borzicactus fieldianus subsp. tessellatus (Akers & Buining) G.J.Charles	Peru.
