= Deborah Griscom Passmore =

American botanical illustrator

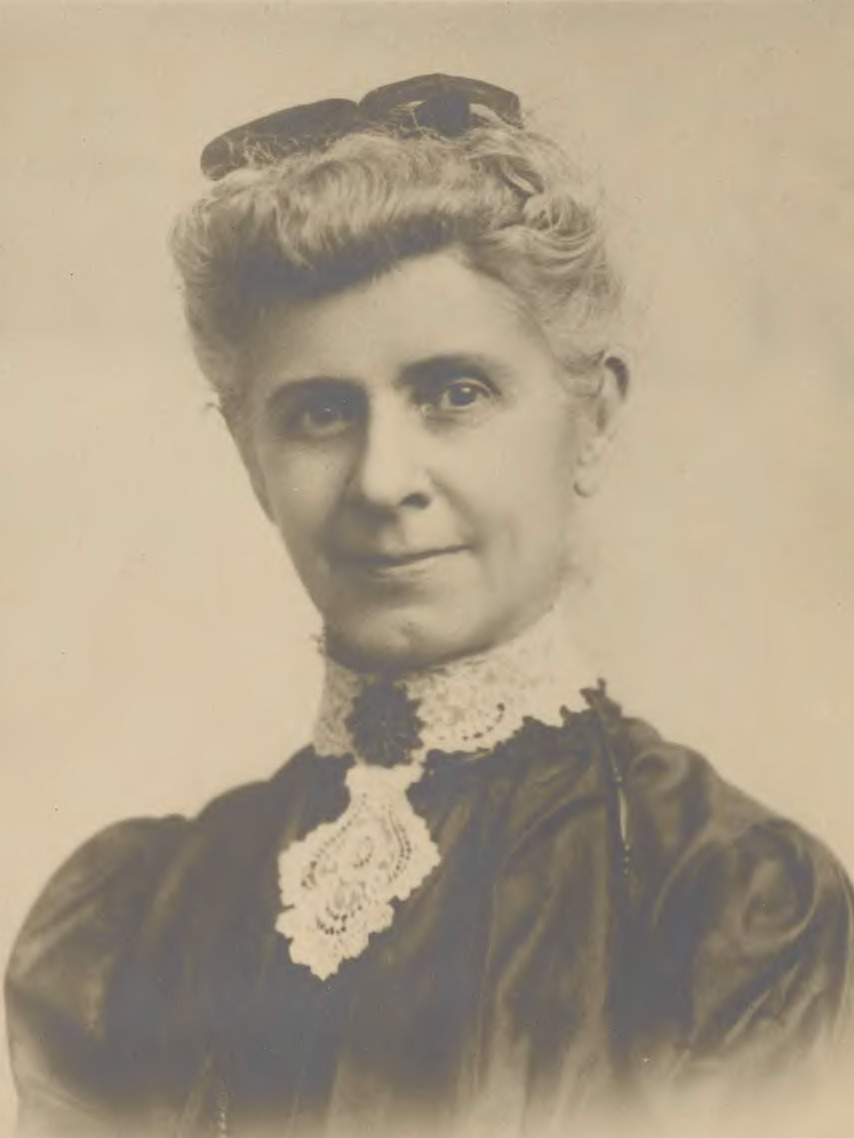
- Born: July 17, 1840; Delaware County, Pennsylvania
- Died: January 3, 1911 (aged 70); Washington, D.C.
- Education: Pennsylvania Academy of the Fine Arts

Deborah Griscom Passmore (1840–1911) was a botanical illustrator for the U.S. Department of Agriculture who specialized in paintings of fruit. Her work is now preserved in the USDA's Pomological Watercolor Collection, and she has been called the best of the early USDA artists. She rose to lead the USDA staff artists, and she became the most prolific of the group, contributing one-fifth of the 7500 paintings in the Pomological Watercolor Collection.

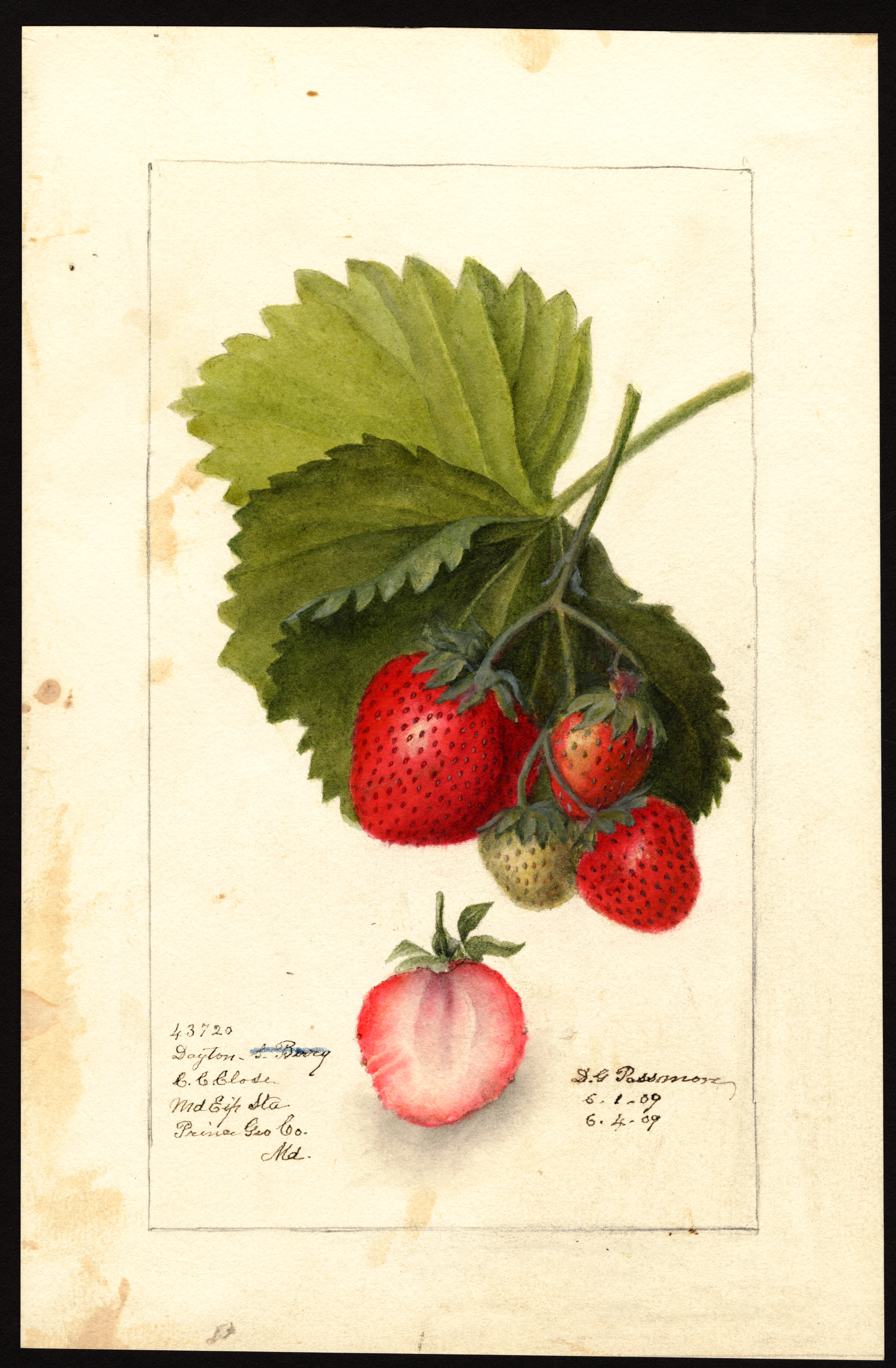
Dayton (strawberry) watercolor by Deborah Griscom Passmore, 1909

== Early life and education ==
Deborah Griscom Passmore was born in Delaware County, Pennsylvania, on July 17, 1840, the fifth and last child of Everett Griscom Passmore (1787–1868), a farmer, and Elizabeth K. Knight (c.1800–1845), a teacher and preacher for an orthodox branch of Quakers. The youngest of the family, with two older brothers and two older sisters, Passmore was given the forenames Deborah Griscom after her paternal grandmother, who was a first cousin of Betsy Ross. Her mother died while she was still a child, and Passmore was educated at the nearby boarding school where her mother had taught before her marriage. She went on to train as an artist at the School of Design for Women and the Academy of Fine Arts in Philadelphia. Her first cousin Deborah Passmore Gillingham (1820–1877) was also a botanical artist, though an amateur whose work was not published until recently.

Passmore followed up her Philadelphia art training with a year studying art in Europe. There, she found inspiration in the botanical illustrations of Marianne North at Kew Gardens, England, and when she returned to the United States, she began painting the wildflowers of America as well as lilies and other flowers. She hoped to publish these watercolors under the title Flowers in Water Color: Wildflowers of America, but she never managed to do so and the manuscript is now in the USDA's Special Collections. Passmore prided herself on delineating her subjects with minute accuracy and sometimes used as many as a hundred washes to get the desired effect. The noted botanist Edward Lee Greene was a great admirer of Passmore's flower paintings.

Passmore also painted cacti, and some of her watercolors were printed in a 1919 work entitled The Cactaceae that was published by the Carnegie Institution.

== USDA career ==
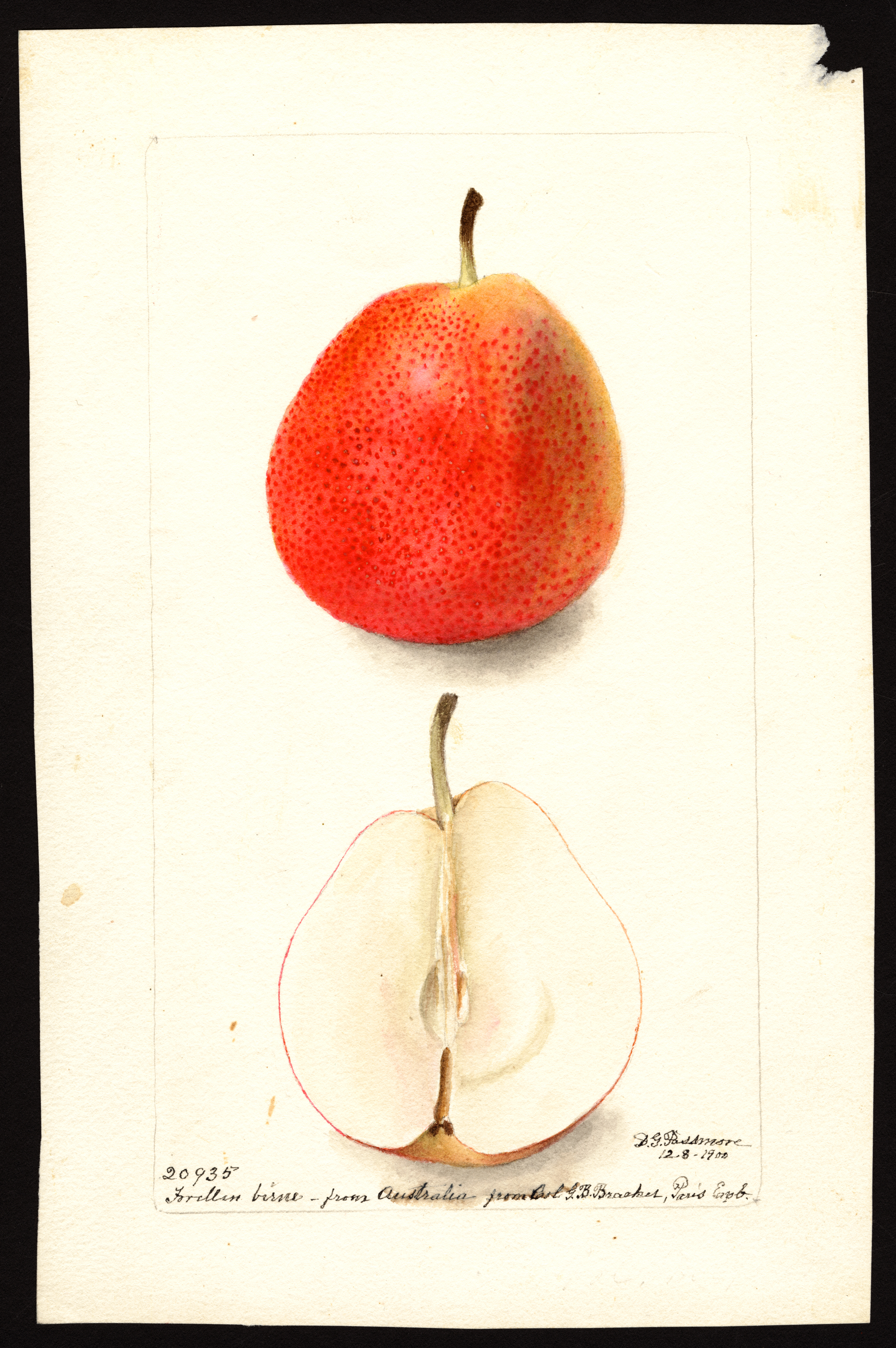
Forelle (European pear) watercolor painted in 1900 by Deborah Griscom Passmore (USDA)

Passmore worked in Philadelphia as a teacher for several years before being induced to move to Washington, D.C., by William Wilson Corcoran, founder of the Corcoran Gallery of Art, who was very impressed by her work. Corcoran died before Passmore could gain work through this connection, and instead she took a job in 1892 as an illustrator with the U.S. Department of Agriculture. This was a time when the major fruit-producing regions in the United States were just beginning to emerge, as farmers worked with the USDA to establish orchards for expanding markets. Photography was not yet in widespread use as a documentary medium, so the government relied on artists like Passmore, Amanda Newton, Elsie Lower, Ellen Isham Schutt, and Royal Charles Steadman to produce technically accurate drawings for its publications.

Passmore was one of more than 50 botanical illustrators hired in this early period, and she was quickly promoted, being named the leader of the staff of artists in the Division of Pomology the same year she was hired. One of her first tasks for the USDA was to paint exhibits for the 1893 World’s Columbian Exposition in Chicago; she also entered some of her own paintings in the Exposition's art exhibition. She would ultimately work for the USDA for nineteen years, and Alan Fusonie, the head of the National Agricultural Library's Special Collections in 1990, considers her "the finest example of the quality of the early USDA illustrators" and her fruit watercolors in particular a national treasure. In a book on the roots of ecofeminism, Greta Gaard cites Deborah Passmore alongside the nature artists Lucy Say and Grace Albee as helping to "create a climate and tradition that can be claimed as foundational for ecofeminism."

Passmore's artwork for the USDA covered a wide range of fruit including apples, pears, plums, peaches, oranges, persimmons, strawberries, and gooseberries as well as the less-common loquat, kumquat, and Surinam cherry. She was extremely prolific, producing more than 1500 finished watercolors and drawings for the USDA, more than half of which were created between 1895 and 1902. Many of these can be found in the agency's technical reports and publications. In addition, between 1901 and 1911, a selection of her work was published in the department's yearbook, accompanying an annual report on promising new fruits. Among the cultivars she illustrated for the first of these yearbooks were the McIntosh apple and the Wickson plum.

Passmore also taught art privately in Washington, D.C., where she maintained her own studio. She died at home of a heart attack on January 3, 1911.

Much of Passmore's work is held in the USDA's Pomological Watercolor Collection within the National Agricultural Library's Special Collections. Several prints of her work are on permanent exhibition in the library's main reading room. A few of her cacti watercolors are in the collection of the National Museum of Natural History's Department of Botany.

Watercolors by Deborah Griscom Passmore
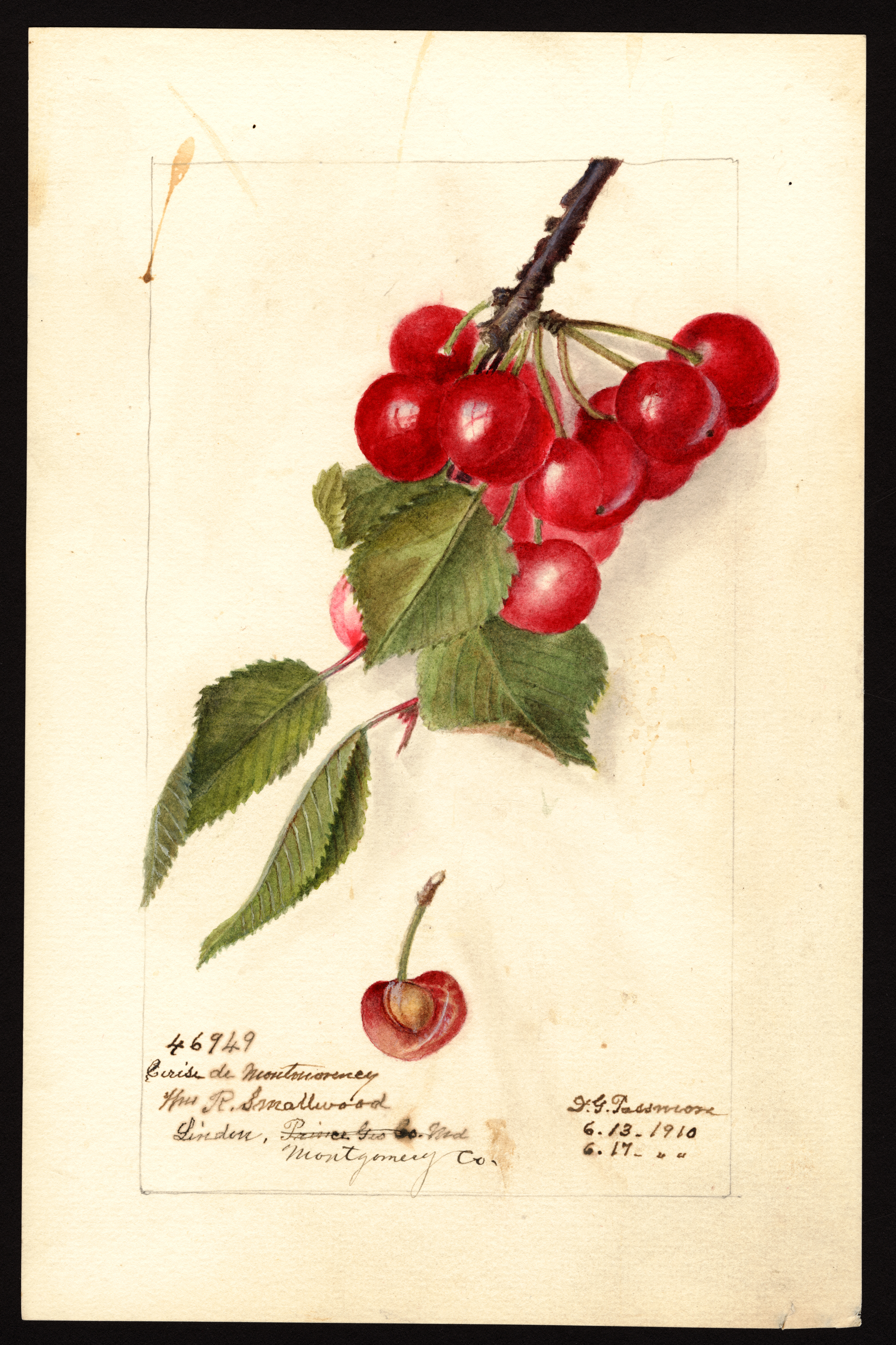
Cerise de Montmorency cherry (Prunus cerasus), with specimen originating in Linden, Maryland.

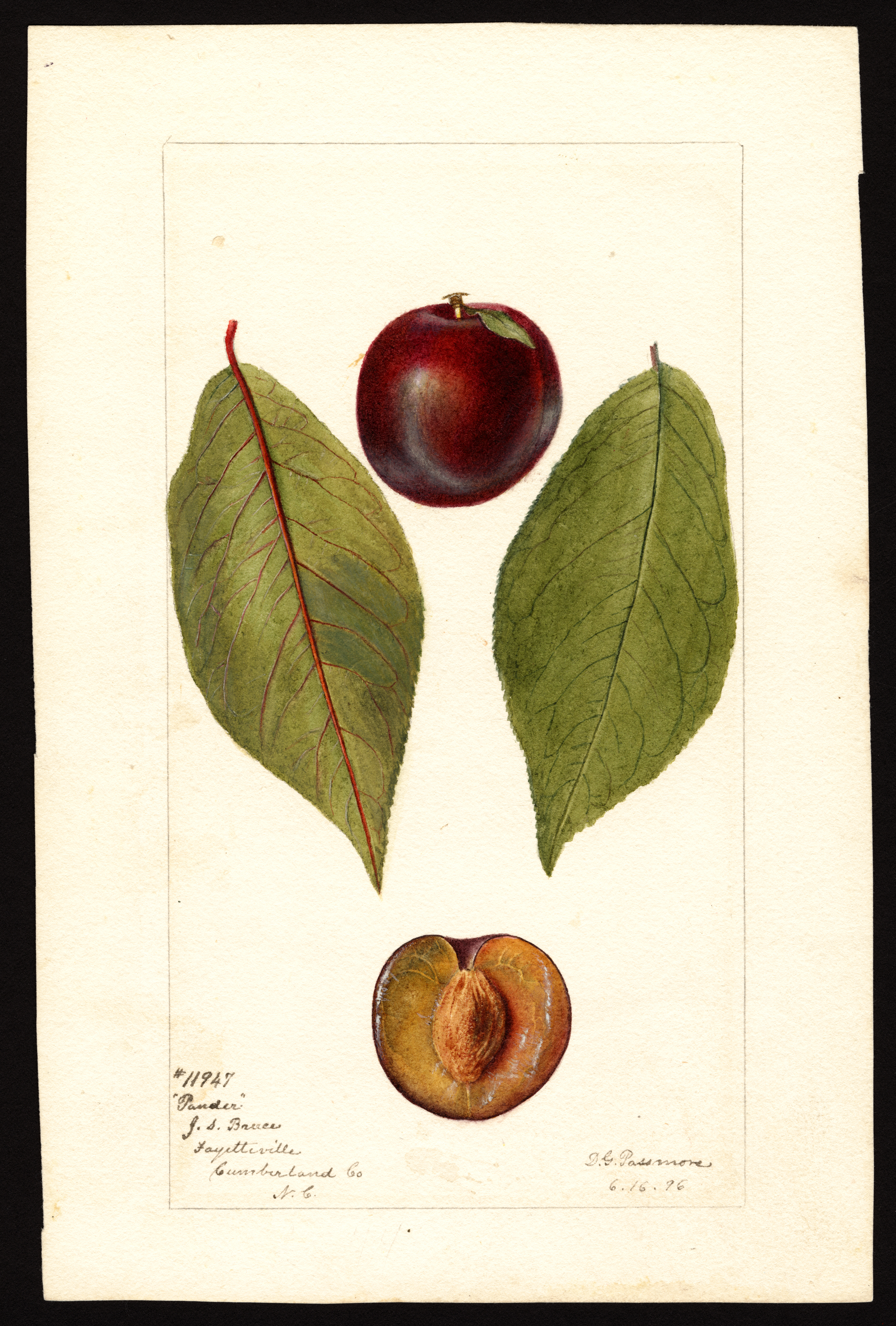
Pander variety of plums (Prunus domestica), with specimen originating in Fayetteville, North Carolina.

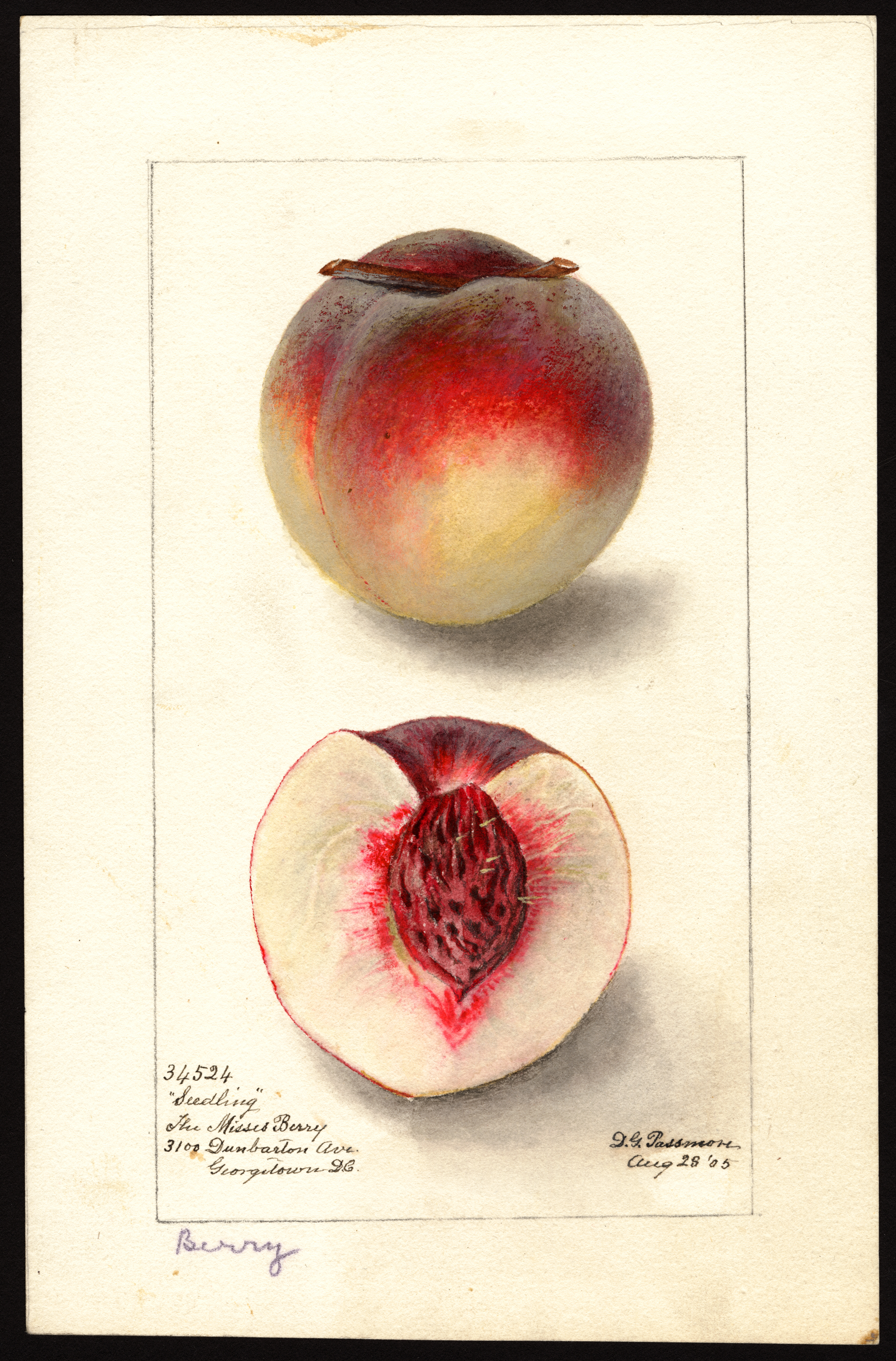
Berry variety of peach (Prunus persica), with specimen originating in Washington, D.C.

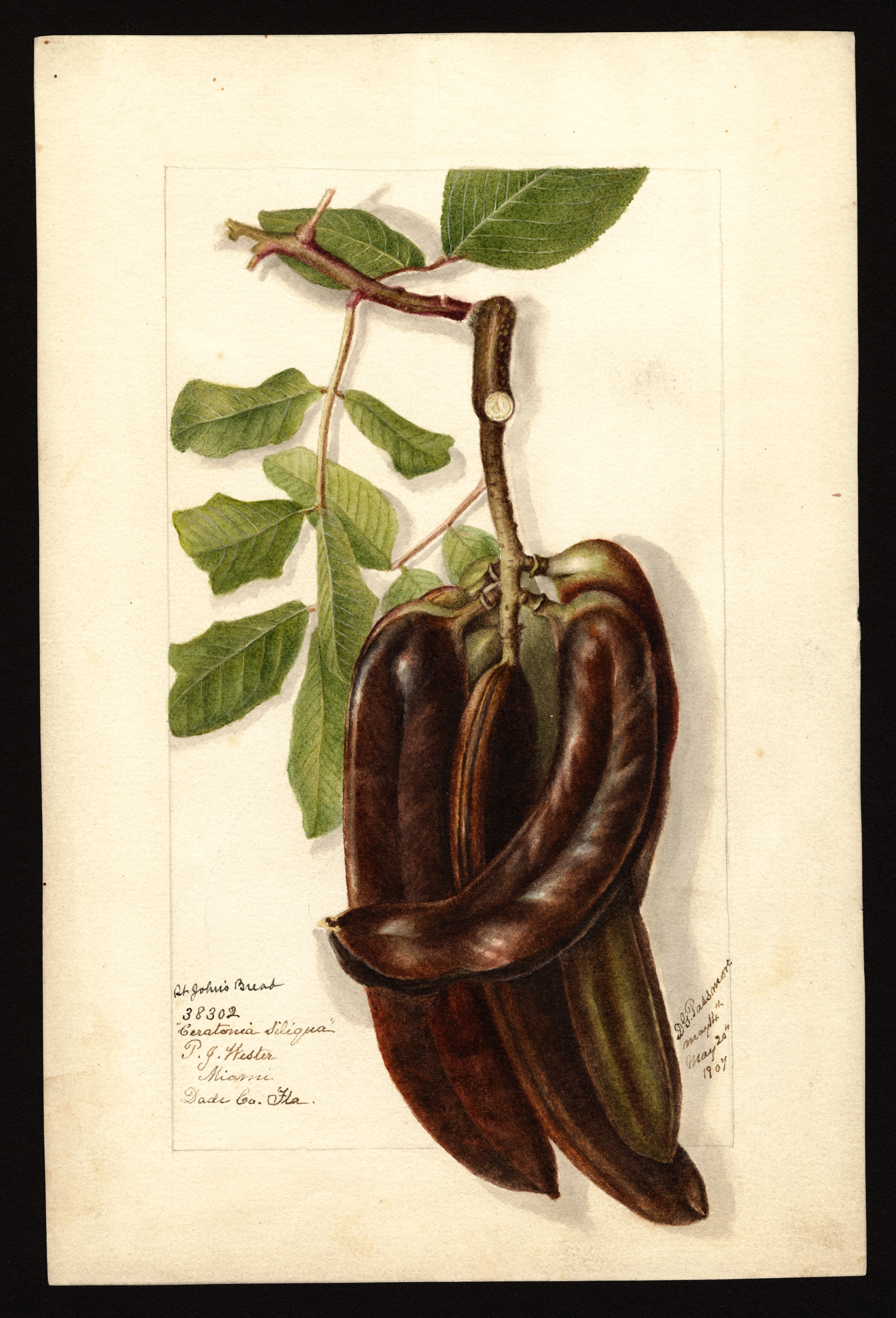
St John's bread (Ceratonia siliqua L.), with specimen originating in Miami, Florida.

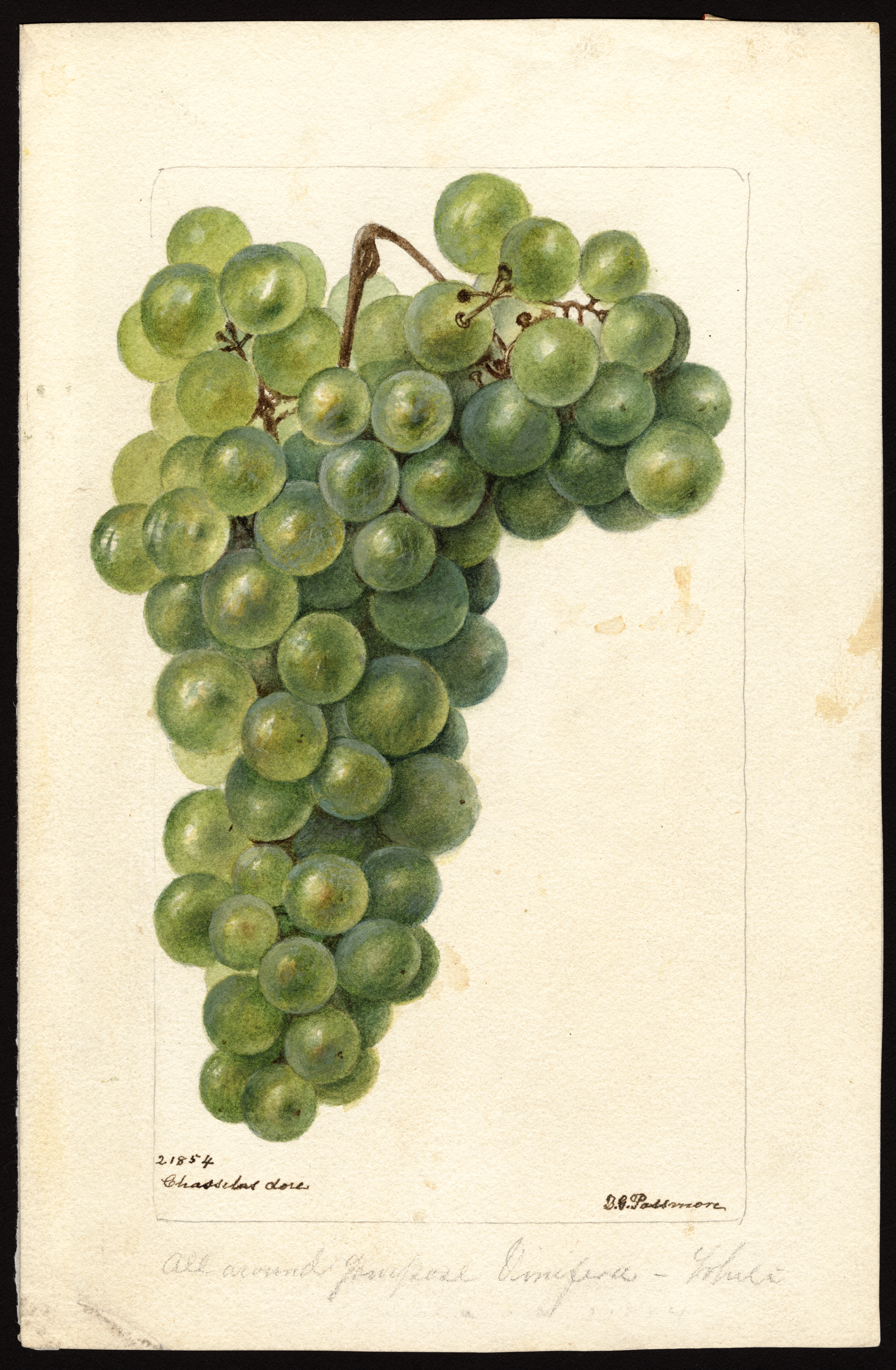
Chasselas Dore variety of grapes (Vitis).
