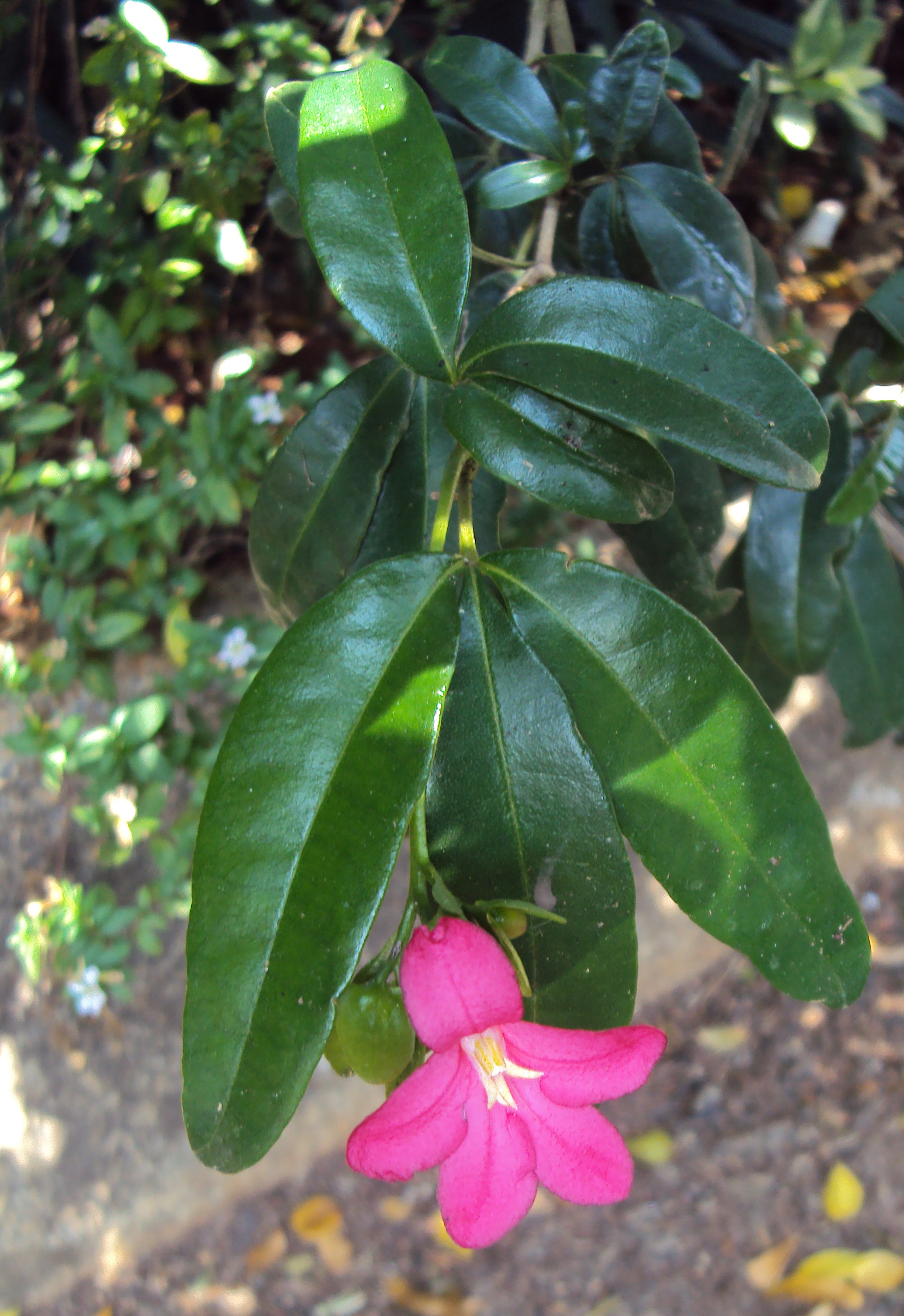
- Ravenia spectabilis

Scientific classification
- Kingdom: Plantae
- Clade: Tracheophytes
- Clade: Angiosperms
- Clade: Eudicots
- Clade: Rosids
- Order: Sapindales
- Family: Rutaceae
- Subfamily: Zanthoxyloideae
- Genus: Ravenia; Vell.

Synonyms
- Lemonia Lindl.; Pomphidea Miers

= Ravenia (plant) =

Genus of flowering plants

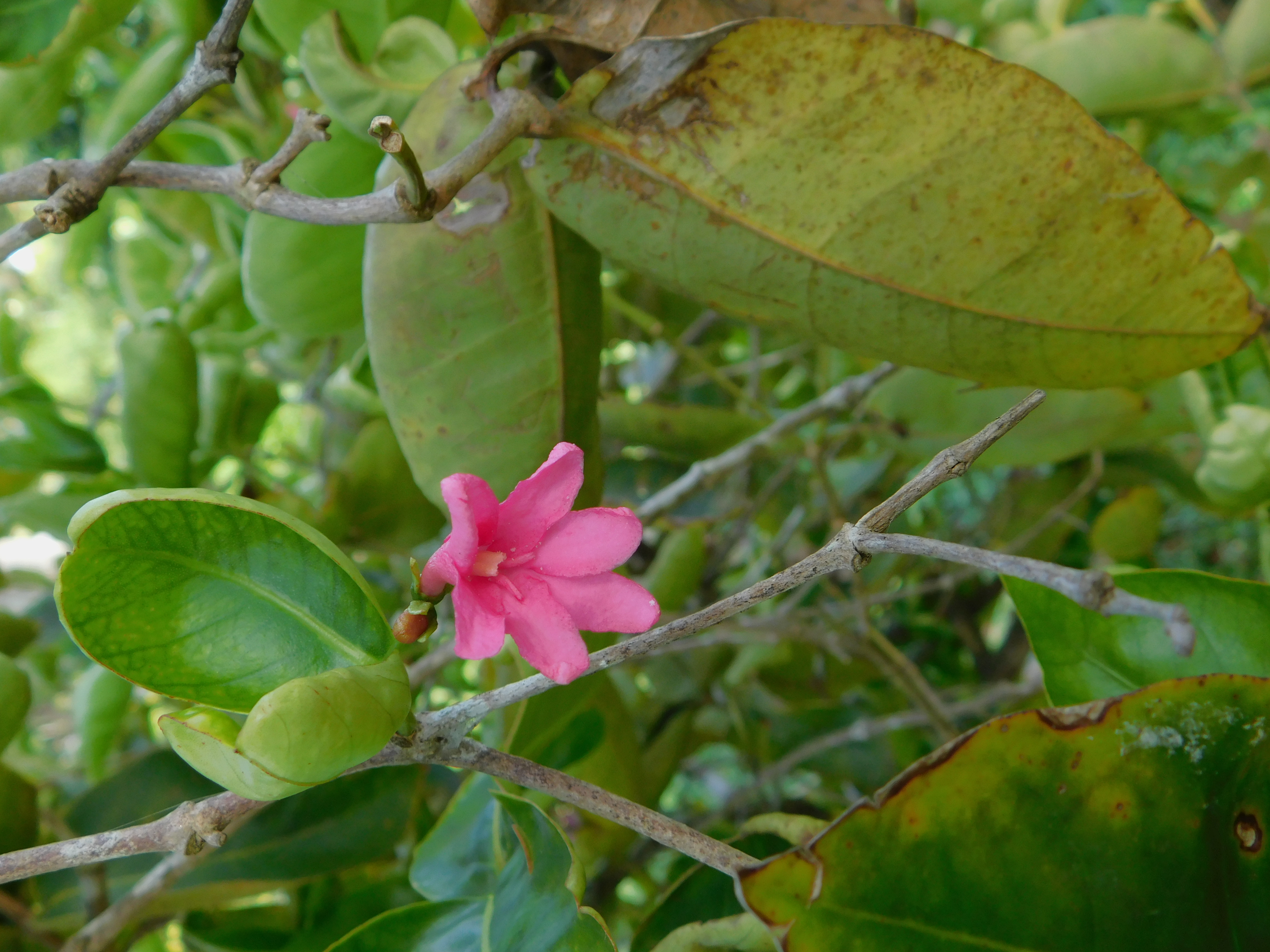

Ravenia is a genus of flowering plants in the citrus family, Rutaceae.

The genus name of Ravenia is in honour of Jean François Ravin (18th century), a French doctor, professor of botany and medicine at the University of Coimbra in Portugal.

== Known species ==
According to the United States Department of Agriculture and the Agricultural Research Service, GRIN:

- Ravenia baracoensis Borhidi & O.Muñiz
- Ravenia biramosa Ducke
- Ravenia clementiana Vict.
- Ravenia infelix Vell.
- Ravenia polygalaecalyx Ducke
- Ravenia pseudalterna Ducke
- Ravenia shaferi P.Wilson
- Ravenia simplicifolia C.Wright ex P.Wilson
- Ravenia spectabilis (Lindl.) Engl.
- Ravenia swartziana (Miers) Fawc. & Rendle
- Ravenia urbanii Engl. – tortugo prieto
