= Helen Woods =

Helen Woods may refer to:

- Anna Kavan, British novelist
- Helen Jones Woods, jazz musician

== See also ==
- Helen Wood (disambiguation)
