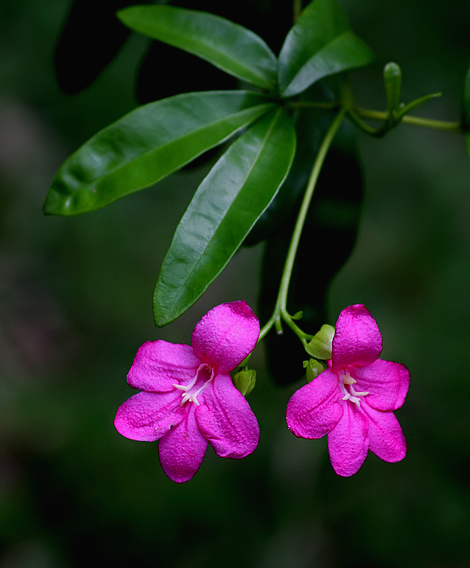

Scientific classification
- Kingdom: Plantae
- Clade: Tracheophytes
- Clade: Angiosperms
- Clade: Eudicots
- Clade: Rosids
- Order: Sapindales
- Family: Rutaceae
- Genus: Ravenia
- Species: R. spectabilis

Binomial name
- Ravenia spectabilis (Lindl.) Engl. 1874.

= Ravenia spectabilis =

Species of flowering plant

Ravenia spectabilis is a species of Ravenia from Brazil.
