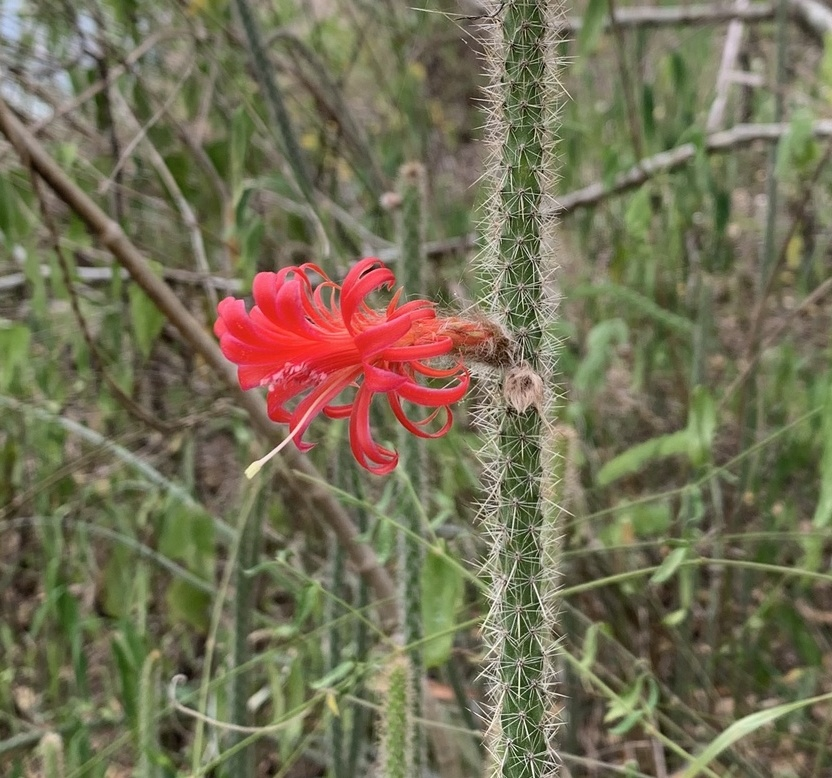

Conservation status
- Least Concern (IUCN 3.1)

Scientific classification
- Kingdom: Plantae
- Clade: Embryophytes
- Clade: Tracheophytes
- Clade: Spermatophytes
- Clade: Angiosperms
- Clade: Eudicots
- Order: Caryophyllales
- Family: Cactaceae
- Subfamily: Cactoideae
- Genus: Borzicactus
- Species: B. tenuiserpens

Binomial name
- Borzicactus tenuiserpens (Rauh & Backeb.) Kimnach 1960

Synonyms
- Bolivicereus tenuiserpens (Rauh & Backeb.) Backeb. 1962; Borzicactella tenuiserpens (Rauh & Backeb.) F.Ritter 1981; Cleistocactus tenuiserpens Rauh & Backeb. 1956 publ. 1957

= Borzicactus tenuiserpens =

Species of cactus

Borzicactus tenuiserpens is a species of Borzicactus found in Peru.
