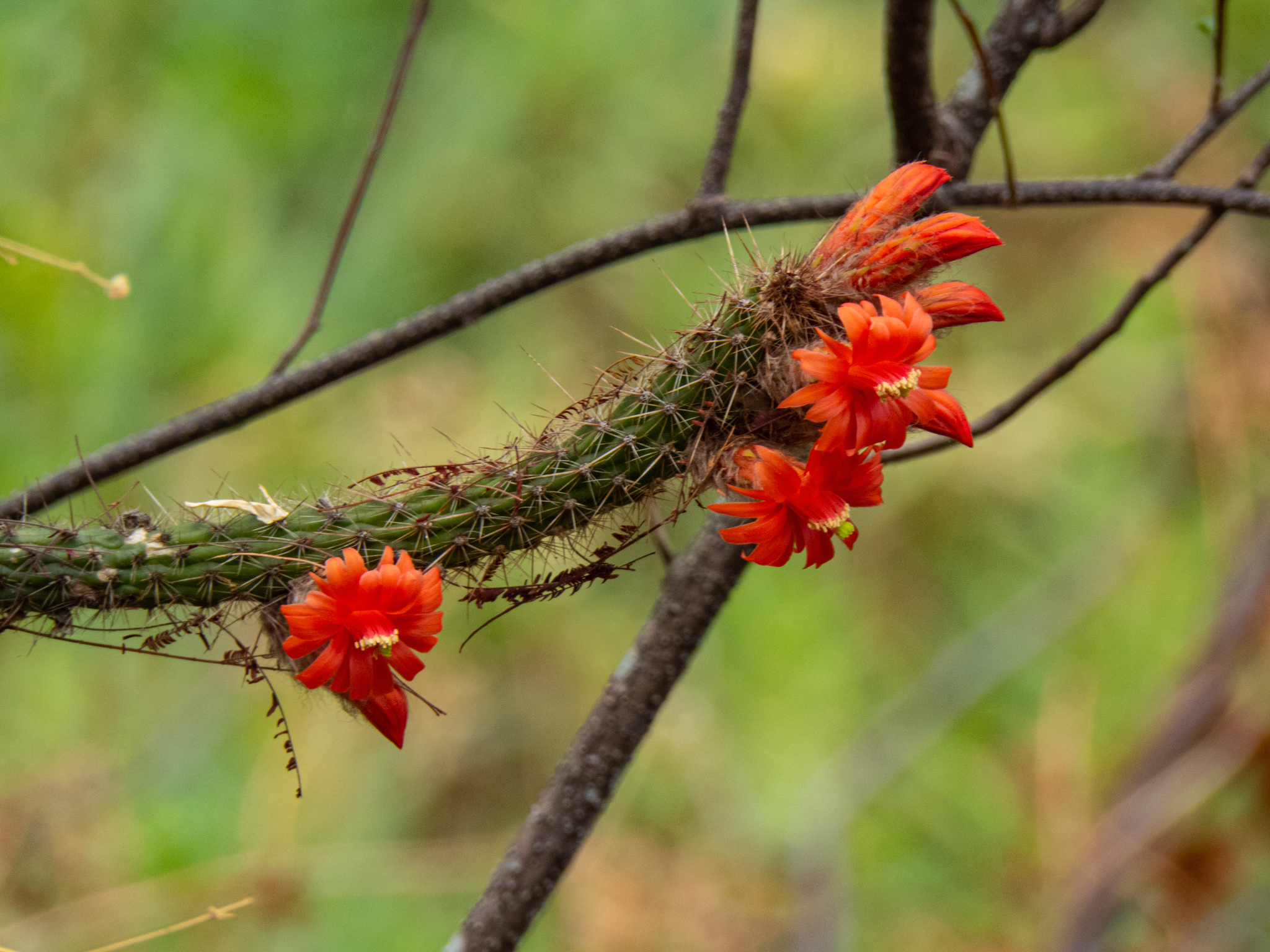

Conservation status
- Endangered (IUCN 3.1)

Scientific classification
- Kingdom: Plantae
- Clade: Embryophytes
- Clade: Tracheophytes
- Clade: Spermatophytes
- Clade: Angiosperms
- Clade: Eudicots
- Order: Caryophyllales
- Family: Cactaceae
- Subfamily: Cactoideae
- Genus: Borzicactus
- Species: B. longiserpens

Binomial name
- Borzicactus longiserpens (Leuenb.) G.J.Charles 2010

Synonyms
- Cleistocactus longiserpens Leuenb. 2002

= Borzicactus longiserpens =

Species of cactus

Borzicactus longiserpens is a species of Borzicactus found in Peru.

== Subspecies ==
Accepted subspecies:

Image	Subspecies	Distribution
	Borzicactus longiserpens subsp. erectus G.J.Charles	Peru.
	Borzicactus longiserpens subsp. longiserpens	Peru.
