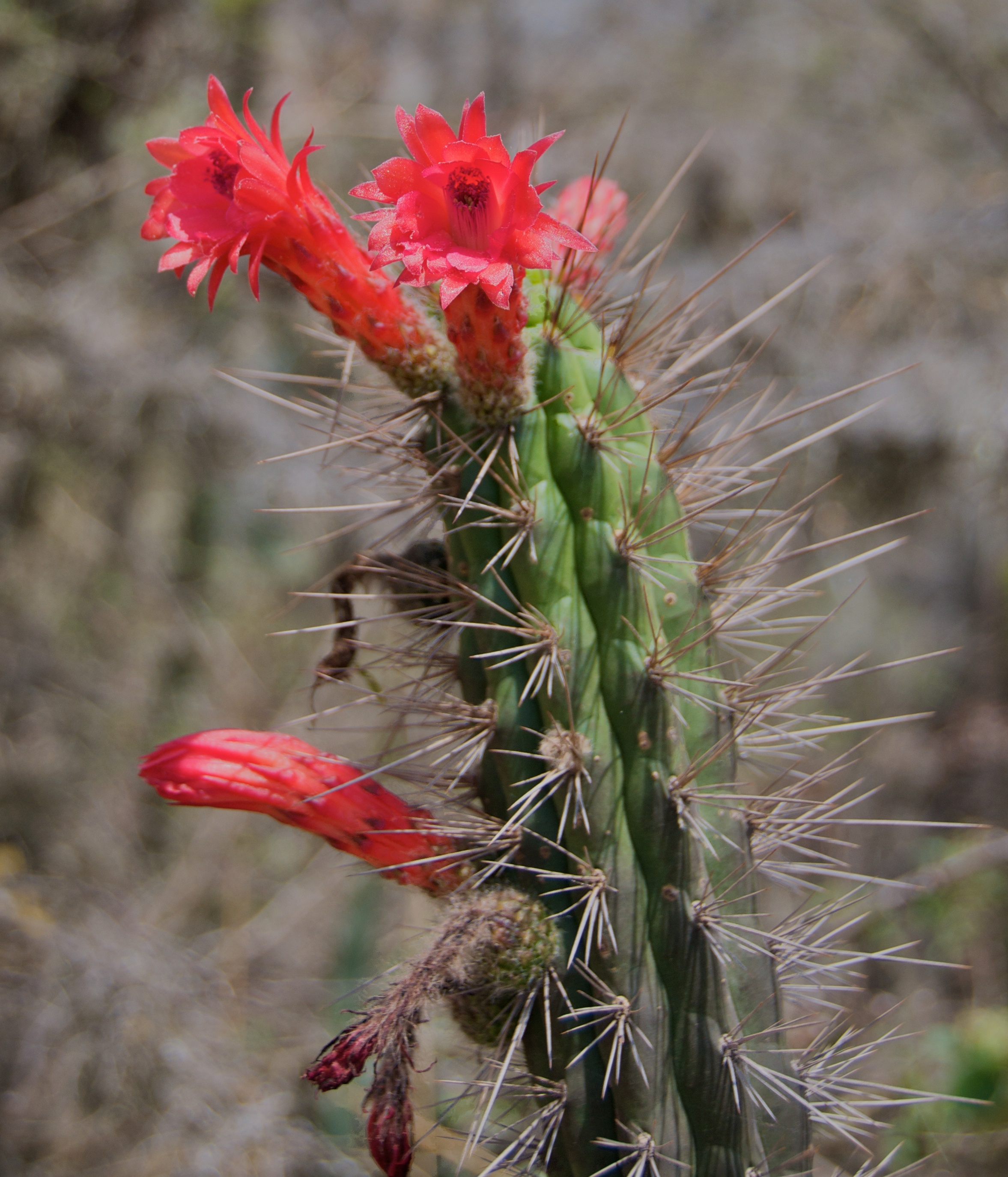

Conservation status
- Least Concern (IUCN 3.1)

Scientific classification
- Kingdom: Plantae
- Clade: Embryophytes
- Clade: Tracheophytes
- Clade: Spermatophytes
- Clade: Angiosperms
- Clade: Eudicots
- Order: Caryophyllales
- Family: Cactaceae
- Subfamily: Cactoideae
- Genus: Borzicactus
- Species: B. sepium

Binomial name
- Borzicactus sepium (Kunth) Britton & Rose

Synonyms
- Cactus sepium Kunth 1823; Cereus sepium (Kunth) DC. 1828; Cleistocactus sepium (Kunth) F.A.C.Weber 1904

= Borzicactus sepium =

Species of cactus

Borzicactus sepium is a species of Borzicactus found in Ecuador.

== Description ==
Borzicactus sepium grows as a shrub with mostly little or no branches from the base, lying to ascending, light to dark green shoots and reaches heights of 0.5 to 2 meters with diameters of 3 to 10 centimeters. There are 6 to 18 low, blunt, grooved ribs. The white or light brown areoles are far apart. The bristly to needle-like thorns are brown, yellowish or blackish and turn gray with age. The 1 to 3 strong central spines are up to 4 centimeters long, the 8 to 10 marginal spines are up to 1 centimeter long.

The slightly zygomorphic, bright red flowers are up to 7.5 centimeters long and have a diameter of 3 centimeters. Their flower bracts are spread out. The spherical, brownish green to yellowish green fruits reach a diameter of up to 5 centimeters.

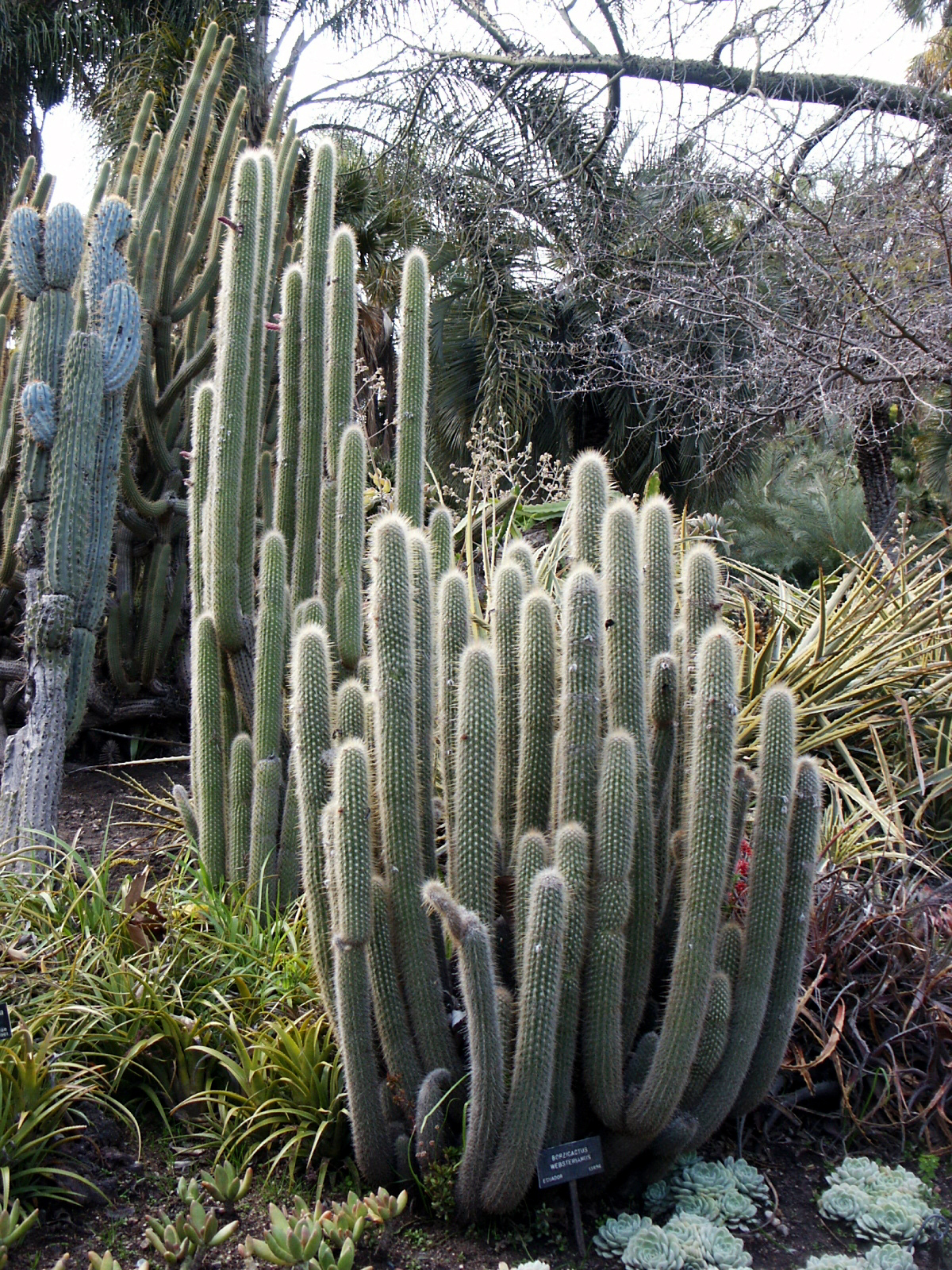
Borzicactus sepium at the Huntington Desert Garden

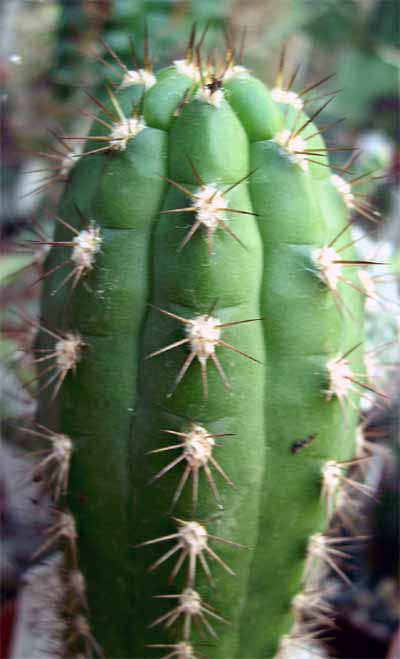
spines

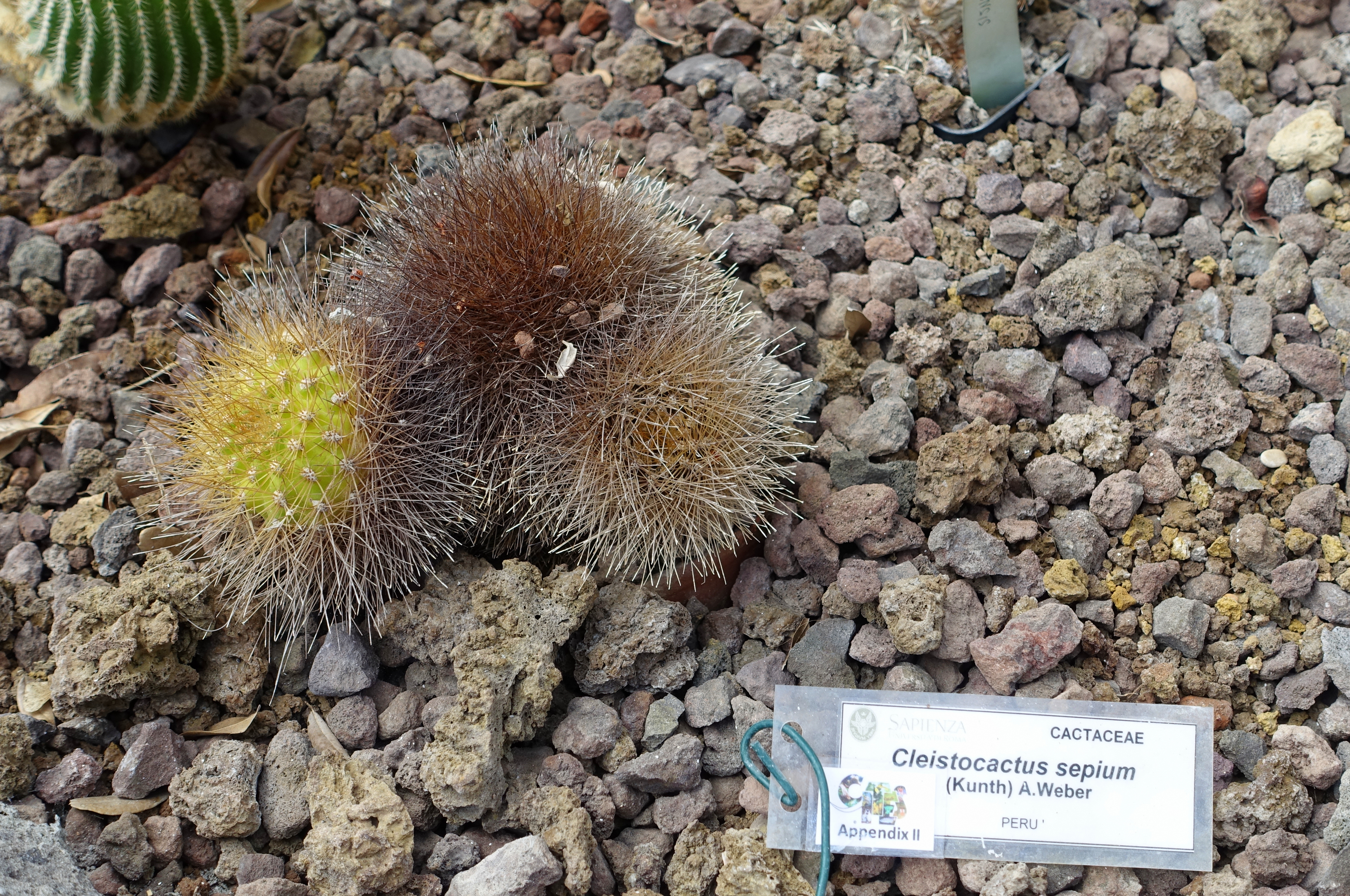
small plants

== Subspecies ==
Accepted supbspecies:

- Borzicactus sepium subsp. morleyanus (Britton & Rose) Lodé
- Borzicactus sepium subsp. sepium
- Borzicactus sepium subsp. ventimigliae (Riccob.) Lodé
- Borzicactus sepium subsp. websterianus (Backeb.) Lodé

== Distribution ==
Borzicactus sepium is widespread in northern and central Ecuador at altitudes of 1500 to 3500 meters.

== Taxonomy ==
The first description as Cactus sepium was in 1823 by Karl Sigismund Kunth. The specific epithet sepium comes from Latin and means 'fence'. Nathaniel Lord Britton and Joseph Nelson Rose placed the species in the genus Borzicactus in 1920. Further nomenclature synonyms are Cereus sepium (Kunth) DC. (1828) and Cleistocactus sepium (Kunth) F.A.C.Weber (1904).
