= Ellen Wood =

Ellen Wood may refer to:

- Ellen Wood (author) (1814–1887), English novelist, better known as "Mrs. Henry Wood"
- Ellen Meiksins Wood (1942–2016), historian and critic of political theory
- Ellen Thelma Wood (1901–1970), artist, model for Robin Vote in Djuna Barnes's novel Nightwood

== See also ==
- Helen Wood (disambiguation)
