= William Fawcett (botanist) =

British botanist (1851–1926)

- Born: 1851
- Died: 1926 (aged 74–75)
- Scientific career
- Fields: Botany

William Fawcett (1851–1926) was a British botanist and coauthor of the Flora of Jamaica.

He was born in Arklow, County Wicklow, on 13 February 1851. He studied at the University of London, obtaining a BSc in 1879. He became a Fellow of the Linnean Society in 1881 and was an assistant in the Department of Botany in the British Museum from 1880 to 1886.

Fawcett was Director of Public Gardens and Plantations in Jamaica from 1887 to 1908. He then returned to Britain where he worked with Alfred Barton Rendle to produce the first few volumes of the Flora of Jamaica, (illustrated by Beatrice O. Corfe and Helen Adelaide Wood).

He died at Blackheath, London on 14 August 1926.
