= The Cactaceae =

Monograph by Nathaniel Lord Britton and Joseph Nelson Rose

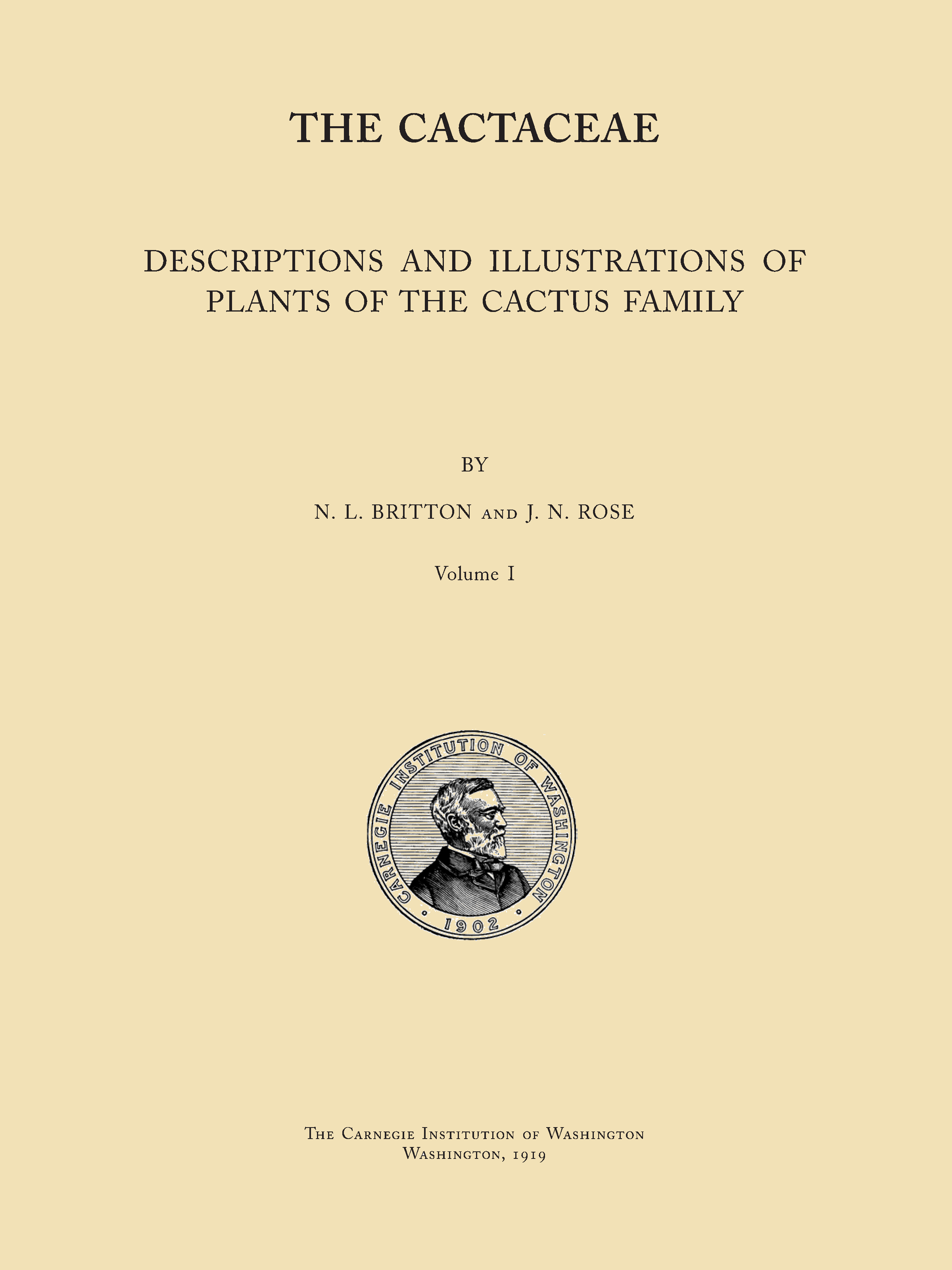
- The Cactaceae Image
- Author: Nathaniel Lord Britton; Joseph Nelson Rose
- Illustrator: Mary Emily Eaton; H.A. Wood; Kako Morita
- Language: English
- Publisher: The Carnegie institution of Washington
- Publication date: Between 1919 and 1923
- Publication place: United States
- Media type: Monograph

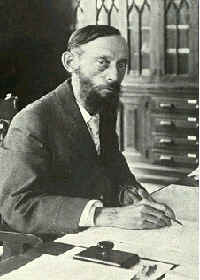
Nathaniel Lord Britton

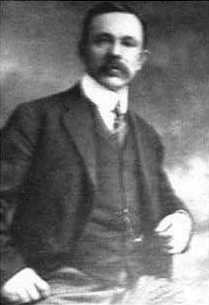
Joseph Nelson Rose

The Cactaceae is a monograph on plants of the cactus family written by the American botanists Nathaniel Lord Britton and Joseph Nelson Rose and published in multiple volumes between 1919 and 1923. It was landmark study that extensively reorganized cactus taxonomy and is still considered a cornerstone of the field. It was illustrated with drawings and color plates principally by the British botanical artist Mary Emily Eaton as well as with black-and-white photographs.

== History ==
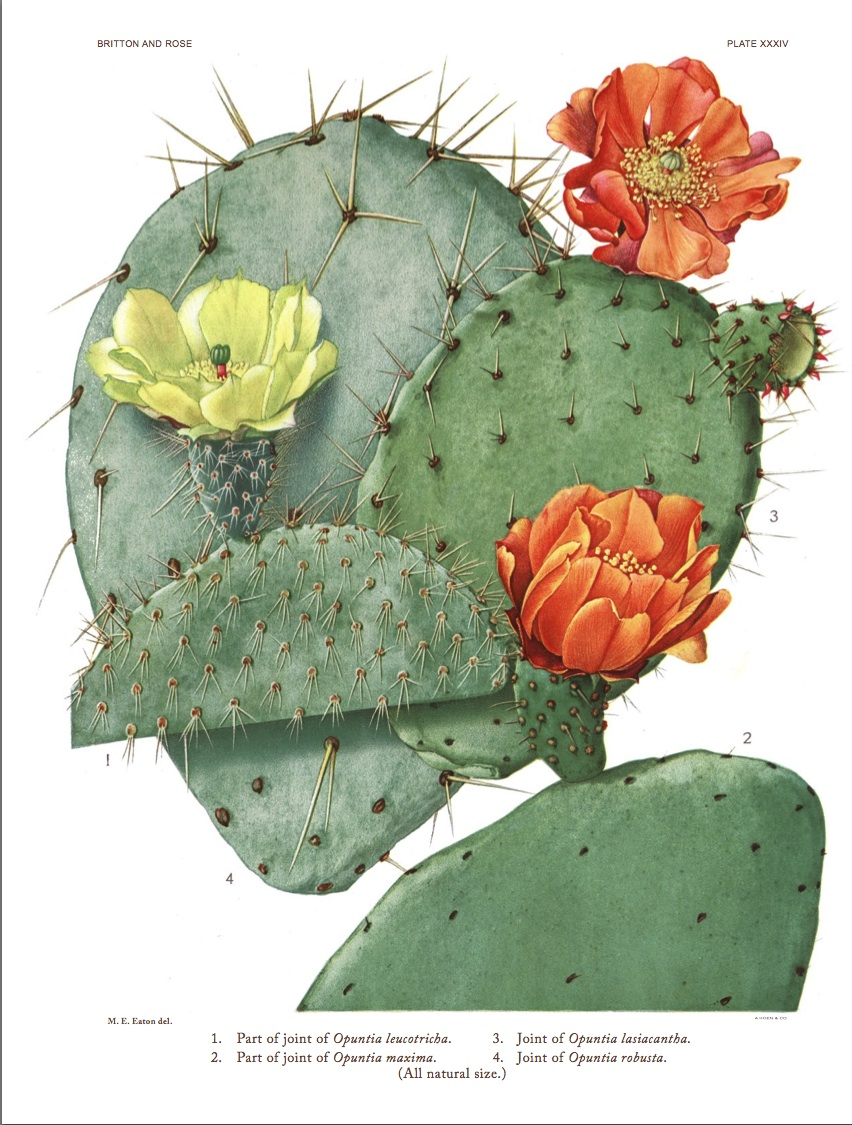
Watercolor of several Opuntia cactus species by Mary Emily Eaton for Britton and Rose's The Cactaceae, 1919 (vol. 1, plate XXXIV)

Nathaniel Lord Britton was a Columbia University geology and biology professor who left the university in 1895 to become the founding director of the New York Botanical Garden. Much of his own field work was done in the Caribbean. Joseph Nelson Rose was an authority on several plant families, including parsley (Apiaceae) and cacti (Cactaceae). He had been a plant curator at the Smithsonian since 1896, and while working there he made several field trips to Mexico, collecting specimens for the Smithsonian and for Britton's newly founded New York Botanical Garden. Together, Britton and Rose published many articles on the stonecrop family (Crassulaceae) before embarking in 1904 on research leading towards The Cactaceae. With the support of Daniel T. MacDougal, director of the Carnegie Institution for Science's Desert Botanical Laboratory, the Carnegie Institution agreed to fund the project. Rose took a leave of absence from the Smithsonian to pursue it, and both Rose and Britton were named Carnegie Institution Research Associates in 1912, when more focused work on the project began. Between 1912 and 1916 Rose and Britton did extensive field work, collecting specimens and touring the botanical gardens and notable collections of Europe, the Caribbean, and North, Central, and South America.

In this period, cactus taxonomy was in a disorganized state with only a few very large and heterogeneous genera. Britton and Rose broke these old-style catch-all genera into smaller, more defined genera, ultimately classifying 1255 species under 124 genera. It has been argued that with this first major overhaul of cactus genera, they ushered in an era of 'splitting' or liberalism in cactus taxonomy, in contrast to the conservative 'lumping' approach that characterized their predecessors.

Britton and Rose defined their genera by the characteristics of the cactus plants' vegetation, flowers, and fruit, as well as by their geographic distribution. They drew on their own and others' field work, as well as on greenhouse studies and specimens in herbaria to describe species included in their exhaustive study. An important aspect of their work was their careful reexamination of existing type specimens, many of which turned out to have been incorrectly identified.

Britton and Rose published The Cactaceae in four volumes through the Carnegie Institution between 1919 and 1923. It "set new standards in cactus botany" and has been called Britton's "magnum opus". Though it was considered definitive in its own day, the taxonomy of Cactaceae has remained problematic, due in part to difficulties in preserving type specimens of cactus. Several taxonomic reorganizations have succeeded Britton and Rose's work, with a major one dating to 1984. (See Cactus entry for more details.) Despite this, the excellence of their work is reflected in the fact that some 50 of the 79 genera they authored were still considered phylogenetically sound in 1990, though some had been redefined.

A black-and-white reprint of the second (1937) edition of The Cactaceae was published by Dover Publications in 1963. In 2006, Daniel Schweich undertook a project to digitize the entire book, and all four volumes can now be downloaded in full color.

== Illustrations ==
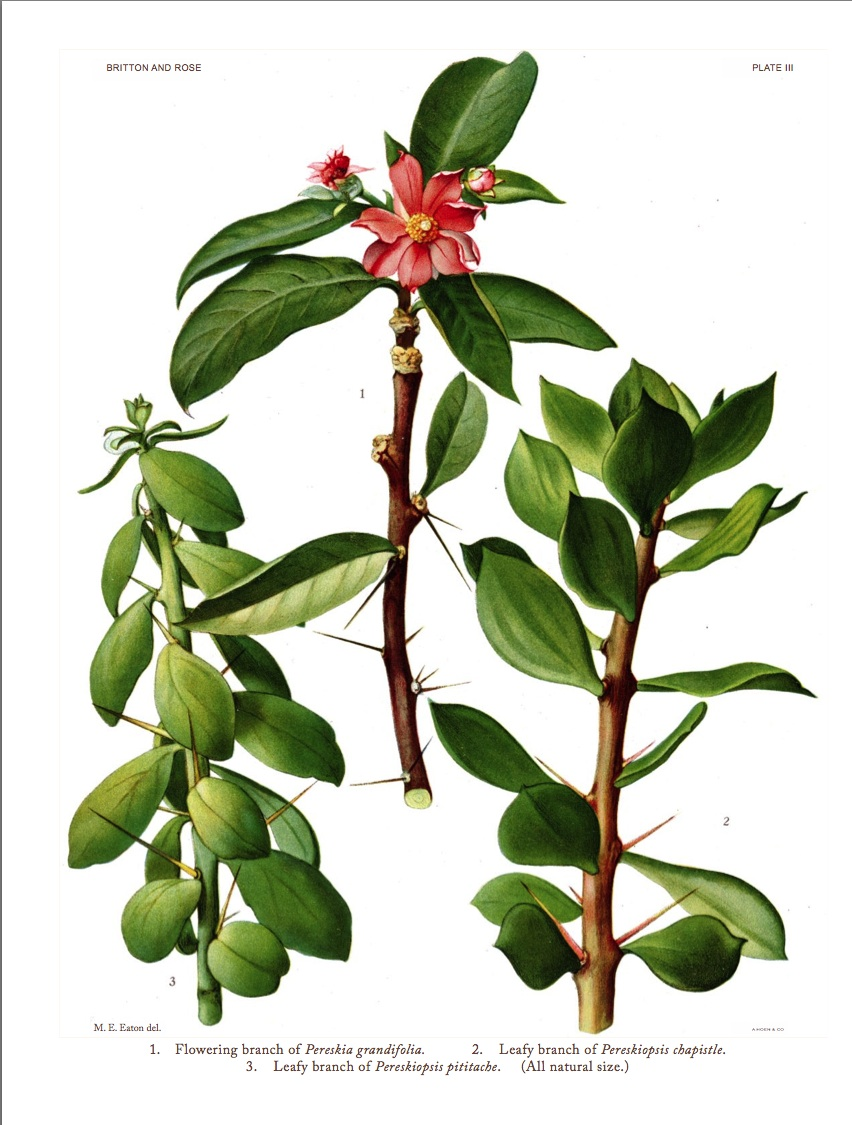
Watercolor of three species of Cactaceae by Mary Emily Eaton for Britton and Rose's The Cactaceae, 1919 (vol. 1, plate III)

In 1911, the British illustrator Mary Emily Eaton moved to New York, where she was employed by the New York Botanical Garden for two decades. The great majority of color plates in the four volumes of The Cactaceae are by Eaton, with a handful by other artists such as Deborah Griscom Passmore, Helen Adelaide Wood, and Kako Morita. Eaton's compositions are striking and her watercolors are noted for their crispness and accuracy of botanical detail.

The color plates are supplemented by black-and-white line drawings as well as by black-and-white photographs of cacti, ranging from long shots taken in the field to close-up details. One contemporary reviewer called The Cactaceae "the most sumptuous botanical publication" since William Rickatson Dykes' 1913 book The Genus Iris.
