= Helen M. Wood =

American computer scientist

Helen M. Wood is an American computer scientist who worked for many years at the National Bureau of Standards, directed the Office of Satellite Data Processing and Distribution in the National Oceanic and Atmospheric Administration, and served as president of the IEEE Computer Society.

== Education and career ==
Wood is a graduate of the University of Maryland, College Park, where she majored in mathematics. She joined the National Bureau of Standards (later to be renamed the National Institute of Standards and Technology) while she was still a student there. While in government service, she also completed a master's degree in computer science, from American University.

By 1988 she had become Deputy Director of the Institute for Computer Sciences and Technology in the Bureau. In that year, she moved to the National Oceanic and Atmospheric Administration (NOAA) to direct the Office of Satellite Data Processing and Distribution. While with the NOAA, she also chaired the Subcommittee on Disaster Reduction of the National Science and Technology Council. She was president of the IEEE Computer Society for the 1990 term.

== Recognition ==
Wood is a two-time recipient of the Department of Commerce Gold Medal, and has also been awarded the Department of Commerce Silver Medal, Department of Commerce Bronze Medal, and Meritorious Presidential Rank Award. In 1993 she was elected as an IEEE Fellow, "for leadership and contributions to computing and communications standardization". In 1994 the IEEE Computer Society gave her their Richard E. Merwin Award for Distinguished Service, "for outstanding and sustained contributions and leadership to the society and the institute, particularly in the area of standards, publications, and information services."
