= Helen Adelaide Wood =

Jamaican botanical artist (1860–1927)

- Born: 17 August 1860
- Died: 25 November 1927 (aged 67); Jamaica
- Occupation: Botanical illustrator

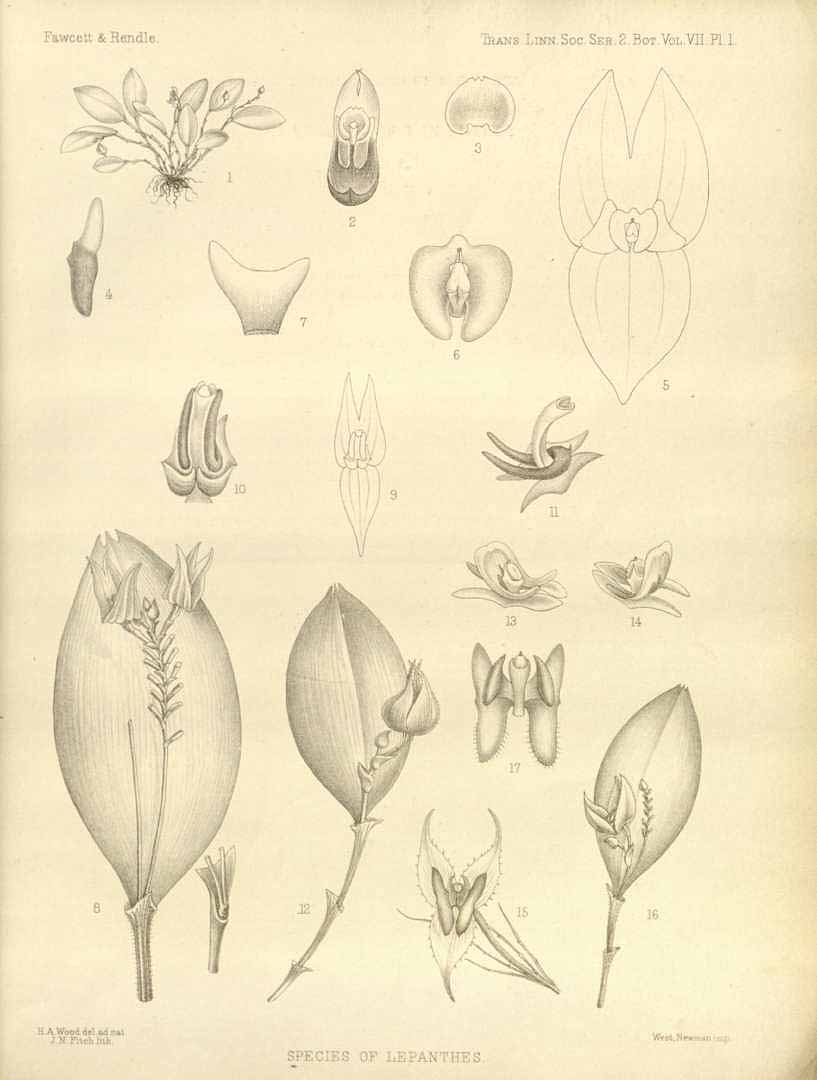
Orchidaceae by H. A. Wood included in Transactions of the Linnean Society of London, 2nd series: Botany

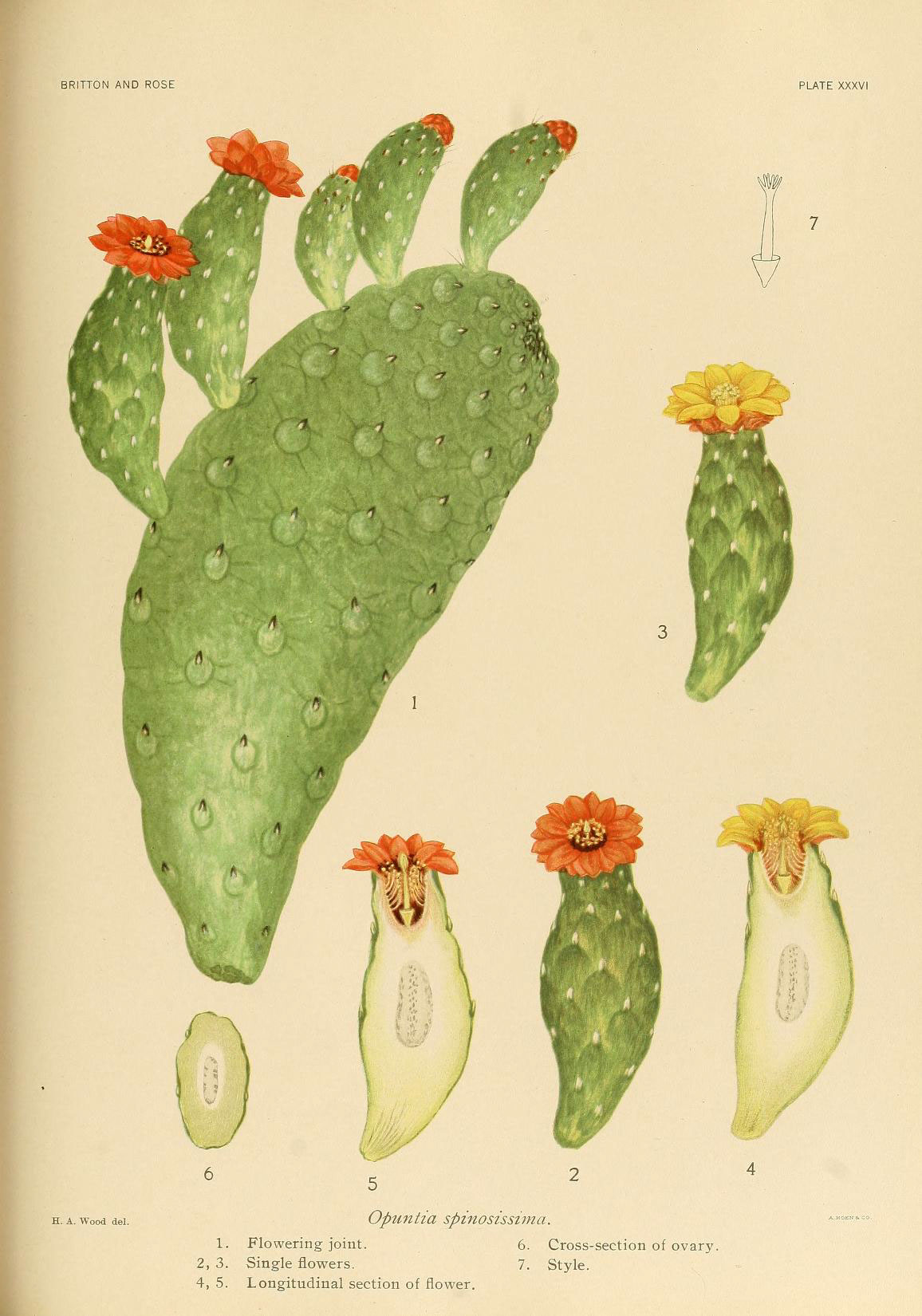
The Cactaceae (Plate XXXVI) (6026512628)

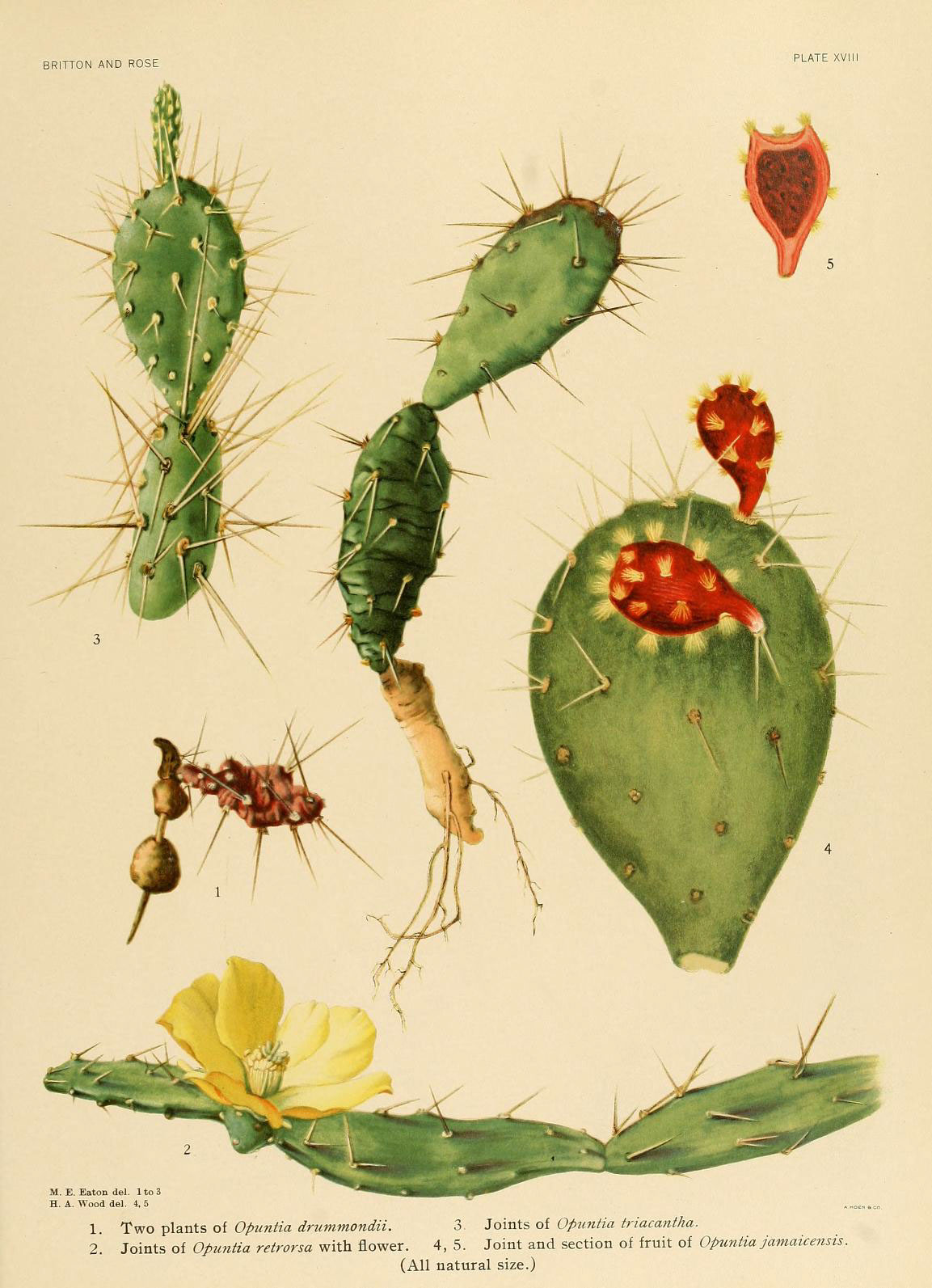
The Cactaceae (Plate XVIII) (6025951147).jpg

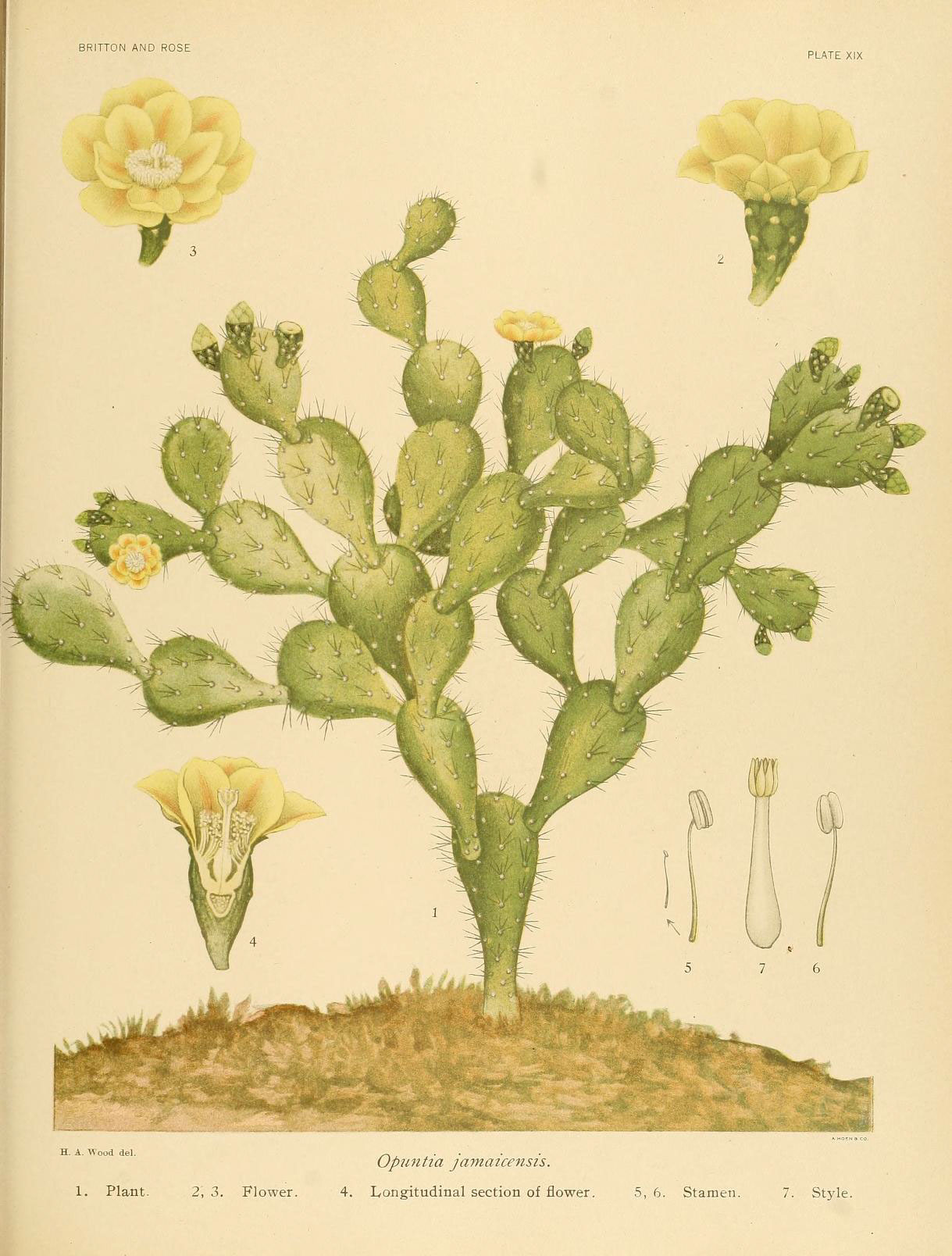
The Cactaceae (Plate XIX) (6025951379).jpg

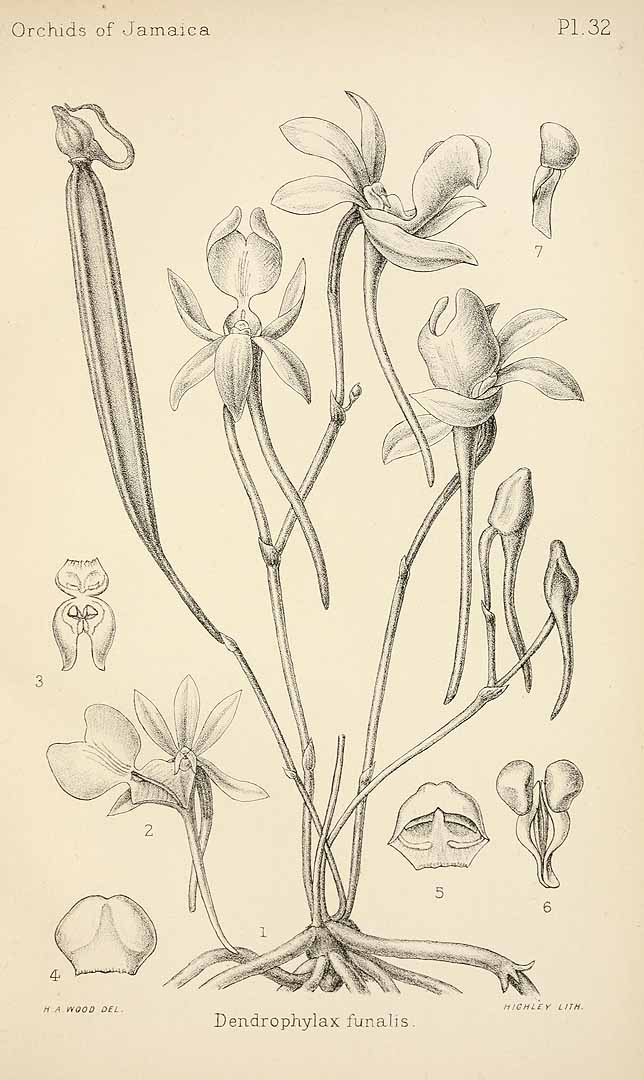
Dendrophylax funalis by Helen Adelaide Wood for Flora of Jamaica volume 1

Helen Adelaide Wood (August 17, 1860 – November 25, 1927) was a British botanical artist and scientific illustrator best known for the collection of her illustrations held at the Natural History Museum of Jamaica. She is also known for illustrating at least one print and three watercolours in Britton & Rose's The Cactaceae, published between 1919 and 1923. The collection of her artwork in the Natural History Museum of Jamaica has been inscribed on the UNESCO Latin America and the Caribbean Regional Memory of the World Register. Along with the Natural History Museum of Jamaica, Wood's artwork is also held in the collection of the National Museum of Natural History. She was one of the first women museum workers in the Caribbean and was employed at the Natural History Museum of Jamaica from 1912 to 1927.

== Life ==
Helen Adelaide Wood was the daughter of John Jarrett Wood, author of Jamaica: Its History, Constitution, and Topographical Description With Geological and Meteorological Notes Compiled for the Use of Schools, and Rachel Ann Wood. Though very little is known about her early life, she learned the skills necessary to become an artist. In comparison to other female botanical artists of the time, many of whom were often taught their skills by a family member or were self taught, it is unknown where Wood obtained her skills. However, her father's scientific background likely gave her a few opportunities to find a willing teacher.

Based on her date of death and the release of pieces of her work, such as in The Cactaceae, it can be estimated that she was active for the late 1800s and very early 1900s. During her active work periods, it would not have been uncommon for her to have struggled to support herself. There is no record of her having married so her art would have been her source of income. Many female artists, such as Elizabeth Blackwell, had similar experiences of using their artwork to support themselves and their families throughout history. During the late 1800s, it would have been difficult for any female artist to achieve great success. Even well regarded artists, such as Augusta Innes Withers, had to have the support of a male counterpart in order to display her work and receive recognition. However, Wood was fortunate enough to have her works featured in botanical journals. She was able to work with botanists William Fawcett and Nathaniel Lord Britton.

Some of her earliest recorded works from 1904 are seen in Transactions of the Linnean Society of London, 2nd series: Botany such as her illustration of Orchidaceae. Her later work was featured in Flora of Jamaica volumes 1, 3, 4, 5, and 7 and The Cactaceae volumes 1, 2, and 3. Only in the first volume of Flora of Jamaica is she mentioned in the preface and introduction where each person is thanked and listed for their contribution. In the rest of these instances, she is not mentioned in the introduction at all. She is, however, credited by her signature, H. A. Wood or simply Miss Wood, near each image. In Flora of Jamaica volume 7 and The Cactaceae volume 3, she is not credited in the collection at all despite being listed as a contributor by Biodiversity Heritage Library.

Later in her life she worked for the Natural History Museum of Jamaica. Not much is known about the time she worked there. However, this is also the location of a collection of her work. Around 480 of her original works have been housed there since her death. The pieces in this collection are a range of styles including charcoal, ink, and watercolor. These illustrations are mostly of plants with a few birds, all of which are found in Jamaica. Some of the subjects of her artwork are no longer found in nature which make her collection all the more valuable. Other locations of her work include the Natural History Museum in London and the Smithsonian Institution which contain pieces from both Flora of Jamaica and The Cactaceae.

== Artistic style ==
In comparison to the other botanical illustrators of the time, Wood had very accurate and straightforward depictions while also making sure to capture the beauty of her subject. A large portion of her work captures not only the subject itself, but also closeups of the flowers or even depictions of the plant sliced in half. In other cases, she will use specimen logic where only one form is depicted at a time. However, even in those images, like in The Cactaceae (Plate XIX), she tends to redraw individual portions of the plant with more detail.

In thinking about her more focused and centered depictions of plants, one can draw connections with Georg Dionysius Ehret, a botanist and botanical illustrator from the 1700s. She may have drawn inspiration from his later works which were centered around one form but tended to have much more detailed illustrations of small pieces of the plant beside the overall drawing. There is also a strong connection to Robert Hooke and his method of Micrographia to obtain more detailed images. Her method of drawing a sliced fragment of plant would have likely been used through the influence of Nehemiah Grew who modified Hooke's method to study the structure of different plants.

There can also be comparisons of her work to earlier and more established illustrators like Joris Hoefnagel from the late 1500s. In comparing her work to his, it is possible to see overlaps in the beauty and detail. However, unlike Hoefnagel who tended to combine multiple forms in one illustration, Wood's illustrations included only closeups of the plant itself, or in some cases, an inclusion of the ground. Where many illustrators, especially in early time periods, often used flowy and intricate lettering around their art, Wood's art is much more plain. In her depictions, she labels her illustrations very scientifically, if at all. This short textual identification is often combined with numerical labels so that the flow of the drawing is not interrupted by sections of descriptions. The detailed descriptions are often left to the botanists who wrote about her subjects. All of her work is in collaboration with multiple well known botanists. It is also possible to notice her signature below each of her pieces.
