= Shull =

Shull is a surname. Several members of the Shull family became prominent scientists, including siblings geneticist George Harrison Shull, botanist Charles Albert Shull, zoologist Aaron Franklin Shull, and botanical illustrator J. Marion Shull. Related members of this same branch of the family include another sibling, the scholar and poet John William Scholl, and the daughter of Aaron Franklin Shull, geneticist Elizabeth Shull Russell. Notable people with the surname include:

- Aaron Franklin Shull (1881–1957), American zoologist
- Andrew Shull (born 1981), American football player
- Avriel Shull (1931–1976), American architect
- Charles Albert Shull (1879–1962), American botanist
- Clifford Shull (1915–2001), American physicist
- Denise Shull (born 1959), American writer
- Ernest M. Shull (1915–2002), American missionary and naturalist
- George Harrison Shull (1874–1954), American geneticist
- Harrison Shull (1923–2003), American theoretical chemist
- J. Marion Shull (1872–1948), American botanical illustrator and plant breeder
- Joseph Horace Shull (1848–1944), American politician
- Laurens Shull (1894–1918), American football player
- Megan Shull (born 1969), American writer
- Paul Shull (born 1973), Canadian music manager
- Richard B. Shull (1929–1999), American actor
- Tom Shull (born 1951), American businessman and politician

== See also ==
- Shull Mountain, a mountain in Washington state, United States
- Shull Rocks, rock formation in Graham Land, Antarctica
