= William Schull =

American geneticist

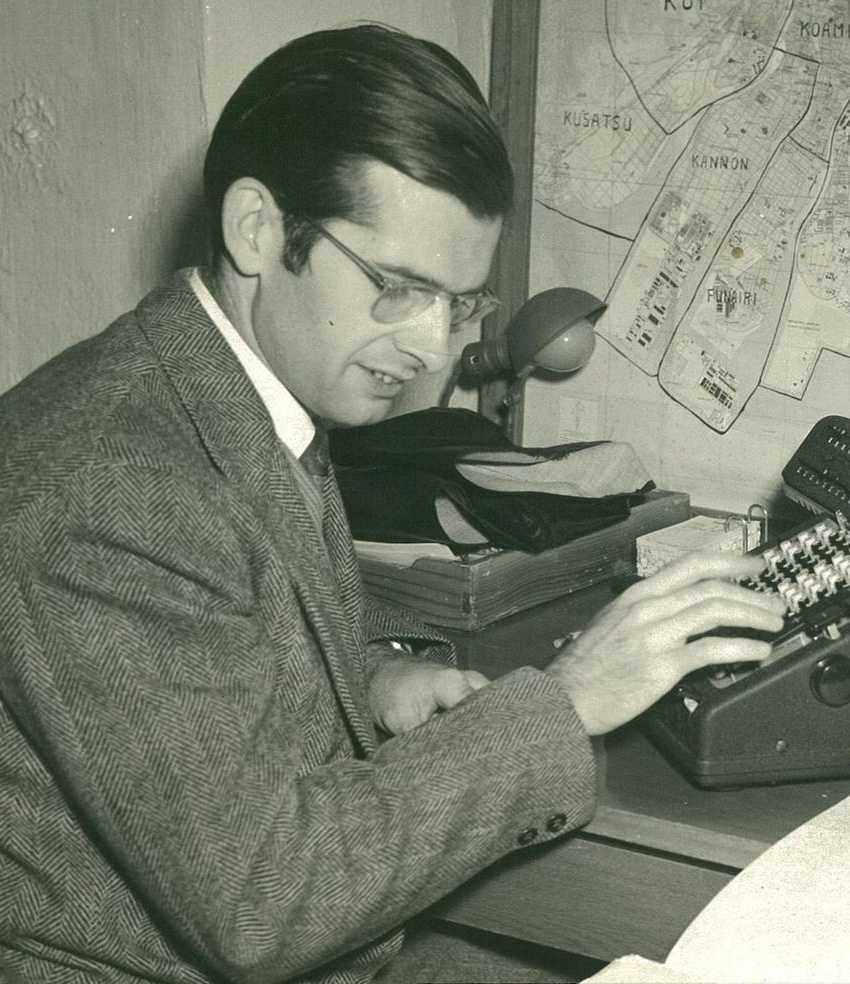
- William (Jack) Schull ca. 1949-1950
- Born: William Jackson Schull; March 17, 1922; Louisiana, Missouri
- Died: June 20, 2017 (aged 95)
- Education: Marquette University; Ohio State University
- Known for: Human Genetics
- Spouse: Victoria (Vicky) Margaret Schull (née Novak)
- Scientific career
- Fields: Genetics
- Workplaces: The University of Texas Health Science Center at Houston; University of Michigan

William Jackson (Jack) Schull (17 March 1922 – 20 June 2017) was an American geneticist and Professor Emeritus of Human Genetics at The University of Texas Health Science Center at Houston. He worked for the Atomic Bomb Casualty Commission in Japan, was one of the founding members of the Department of Human Genetics at the University of Michigan, and was the founding director of the Center for Demographic and Population Genetics (now known as the Human Genetics Center) at The University of Texas Health Science Center at Houston. His scientific contributions include studies on the effects of ionizing radiation on human health, the role of heredity and the interaction of heredity and environment in the etiology of chronic disease, the effects of inbreeding in human populations, the mechanisms of adaptations to hypoxic conditions, and the genetic epidemiology of populations burdened by chronic diseases associated with low socio-economic status.

== Early life, military service, and education ==
Schull was born in Louisiana, Missouri, the first son and second child of Eugene Schull, a shoe cutter, and Edna Gertrude Davenport. Among his distant relatives there were at least three geneticists, George H. Shull, the discoverer or hybrid vigor, Aaron Franklin Shull, a geneticist at the University of Michigan, and Franklin Shull’s daughter, Elizabeth “Tibby” Buckley Shull Russell, a past president of the Genetics Society of America. In the mid-1920s, the Schull family moved to St. Louis, Missouri and later to Milwaukee, Wisconsin. Schull started his academic studies at Marquette University in Milwaukee in 1939. In December 1942 he enlisted in the army and served as surgical technician with the 37th Infantry Division in the South Pacific until December 1945. Schull received a Bronze Star for medical services in the fight to recover Baguio on the island of Luzon, Philippines in 1945 during World War II. Schull created a device for oxygen tanks that allowed for twice the normal oxygen capacity in order to help treat more wounds and save the lives of severely wounded soldiers. After the war, he finished his bachelor's degree in Zoology at Marquette in 1946, and then went on to obtain a master's degree in Zoology in 1947.

On 7 September 1946, Schull married Victoria (Vicky) Margaret Novak at Saint John the Divine Catholic Church in Milwaukee. They were inseparable for 63 years, until her death on Tuesday, October 13, 2009 at the age of 87.

In 1949, he completed his Ph.D. degree at the Ohio State University in Columbus, Ohio. On that degree’s completion, Schull had an offer at McGill University, but he turned it down and accepted an offer to go to Japan and work with the Atomic Bomb Casualty Commission. He served as its Chair of the Department of Genetics from 1949 to 1951.

== Scientific contributions ==
Schull’s research dealt with many subjects in human genetics and his 1954 textbook “Human Heredity” (coauthored with James V. Neel) was the first genetics textbook to rely almost solely on examples from human populations. Chief among his earliest scientific interests are a large group of studies on human consanguinity (inbreeding) that spanned half a century of research and a wide geographical range. His first study, in 1953, concerned the effects of Christianity on the degree of inbreeding in Nagasaki. For his studies in Japan, information concerning thousands of people and entire communities was obtained on such items as birth date, birthplace, education, occupation, religion, date of marriage, previous marriages, consanguinity, number of persons in the household, size of the house, diet, income, land holdings, attitudes toward reproduction, and a pregnancy-by-pregnancy listing of the reproductive performances of the husband and wife in this and previous unions. These data were regularly compared, where possible, with the existing records of various government agencies, such as the Koseki-ka (the office of custody of the koseki), the Hokensho (the public health office), the Zeimusho (the tax office), and the Nogyo and Gyogyo Kumiai (the agricultural and fishing cooperatives). In some of the studies in Japan, Schull and his co-authors discovered in excess of 15% of consanguineous marriages, some involve inbred husbands, inbred wives, or both. The negative effects of parental consanguinity and inbreeding were studied in relationship with socioeconomic status and variability.

Another area of very active research concerned the effects of ionizing radiation in the exposed populations of Hiroshima and Nagasaki. In 1981, Schull and colleagues summarized thirty-four years of study on the genetic effects of the atomic bomb, followed by a series of papers on the causes of mortality of A-bomb survivors. Schull has revisited the subject periodically, and readjusted its conclusions whenever new or revised data became available. In 2003, Schull published a synopsis on the children of atomic bomb survivors.

Schull was one of the first researchers to concentrate on the interface between stress and morbidity. In particular, he studied socioeconomic stress, suppressed hostility, racism, and smoking on the well being of African-American populations in and around Detroit.

In the pregenomic era, Schull advanced many methodological innovations in genetics from the field of epidemiological statistics, through practical measures of obesity, to the methodology of paternity exclusion. Of particular interest, at the time was the publication in 1967 of an entire volume of the American Journal of Human Genetics dedicated to the promotion of use of computers in the field human genetics.

In the 1980s, Schull and colleagues pioneered a survey and an in-depth study on obesity, diabetes, gallbladder disease, hypertension, and other cardiovascular and metabolic afflictions among Mexican-Americans in Starr County, Texas.

Other studies concern the genetics of the Aymara tribe in Chile and Bolivia, radiation carcinogenesis in humans, mutations, the genetics and epidemiology of chronic diseases, acheiropodia in Brazil, the adaptation of human populations to high altitudes, the measurement of Darwinian fitness in humans, the genetic structure of human populations, the genetics of night vision, circadian heart rate rhythmicity, the genetics of intellectual disability, and cancer risks.

== Public service ==
Schull held many administrative positions in the sciences, including Vice Chairman and Chief of the Department of Epidemiology and Statistics of the Radiation Effects Research Foundation in Hiroshima (1978–1980, 1996–1997), Director of the Radiation Effects Research Foundation (1986–1987, 1990–1991), Director of the Center for Demographic and Population Genetics at The University of Texas Health Science Center (1972–1995), Director of the Medical Genetics Center of The University of Texas Health Science Center (1981–1994), and Director of the Human Genetics Center of University of Texas Health Science Center (1995–1998).

Schull was a member of the Board of Directors and Secretary of the American Society of Human Genetics from 1958 to 1961 and was its President in 1970.

Dr. Schull’s scientific work was recognized by a great number of honors and awards. Among these honors are the Order of the Sacred Treasure, Third Class, given by the Emperor of Japan in 1992 and the Silvio O. Conte Environmental Health Award in 1991. In 2004, A conversation with Schull was published in the section Voices of the journal Epidemiology.

Schull served on the editorial boards of fifteen academic journal. He served on the editorial boards of Acta Anthropogenetica, International Journal of Human Genetics, and International Journal of Radiation Medicine.

== Selected publications ==
Schull authored, co-authored and edited 15 books, and has published in excess of 400 peer-reviewed original articles, invited articles, book chapters, book reviews, and scientific abstracts. His most notable and most cited publications are listed below.

=== Selected books ===
- Neel, J. V. and Schull, W. J. (1954) Human Heredity. Chicago: University of Chicago Press.
- Crowe, F. W., Schull, W. J. and Neel, J. V. (1956) A Clinical, Pathological and Genetic Study of Multiple Neurofibromatosis. Springfield, Ill.: C. C. Thomas.
- Neel, J. V. and Schull, W. J. (1956) The Effect of Exposure to the Atomic Bomb on Pregnancy Termination in Hiroshima and Nagasaki. Washington, D. C.: National Academy of Sciences National Research Council, Publ. No. 461.
- Neel, J. V., Shaw, M. W. and Schull, W. J. (Eds.) (1965) Genetics and the Epidemiology of Chronic Disease. Washington, D. C.: Government Printing Office.
- Schull, W. J. and Neel, J. V. (1965) The Effects of Inbreeding on Japanese Children. New York: Harper and Row.
- Schull, W. J. (1990) Song Among the Ruins. Cambridge, Mass: Harvard University Press.
- Schull, W. J. and Rothhammer, F. (Eds.) (1990) The Aymara: Strategies in human adaptation to a rigorous environment. Kluwer Academic Publishers, The Netherlands, pp. xiv and 261.
- Neel, J. V. and Schull, W. J. (Eds.) (1991) The Children of Atomic Bomb Survivors: A Genetic Study. Washington, D.C.: National Academy Press, pp. vi and 518.
- Schull, W. J. (1995) Effects of Atomic Radiation: A Half Century of Studies from Hiroshima and Nagasaki. John Wiley and Sons, Inc., pp. xiii and 397.
- Barton, S. A., Rothhammer, R., and Schull, W. J. (1997) Patterns of Morbidity in Andean Aboriginal Populations: 8000 Years of Evolution. Santiago, Chile: Amphora Editores, pp. xi and 275.

=== Selected articles ===
- Crowe, F. W. and Schull, W. J. (1952) Phenylketonuria, studies in pigment formation. Folia Hered. Pathol. 1:259-268.
- Schull, W. J. (1958) Empirical risks in consanguineous mar¬riages: Sex ratio, malformation, and viability. Am. J. Hum. Genet. 10:294-343.
- Harburg, E., Erfurt, J. C., Hauenstein, L. S., Chape, C., Schull, W. J. and Schork, M. A. (1973) Socio ecological stress, suppressed hostility, skin color, and Black White male blood pressure: Detroit. Psychosom. Med. 35:276-296.
- Reed, T. E. and Schull, W. J. (1968) Letter to editor: A general maximum likelihood estimation program. Am. J. Hum. Genet. 20:579-580.
- Harburg, E., Erfurt, J. C., Chape, C. M., Hauenstein, L. S., Schull, W. J. and Schork, M. A. (1973) Socio ecological stress, smoking, skin color, and Black White blood pressure: Detroit. J. Chron. Dis. 26:595-611.
- Schull, W. J., Otake, M. and Neel, J. V. (1981) A reappraisal of the genetic effects of the atomic bombs: Summary of a thirty four-year study. Science 213:1220-1227.
- Kato, H., Brown, C. C., Hoel, D. G. and Schull, W. J. (1982) Studies of the mortality of A bomb survivors. 7. Mortality, 1950 78. Part II. Mortality from causes other than cancer and mortality in early entrants. Radiat. Res. 91:243-264.
- Hanis, C. L., Ferrell, R. E., Barton, S. A., Aguilar, L., Garza Ibarra, A., Tulloch, B. R., Garcia, C. A., and Schull, W. J. (1983) Diabetes among Mexican Americans in Starr County, Texas. Am. J. Epidemiol. 118:659-672.
- Otake, M. and Schull, W. J. (1984) Mental retardation in the in utero exposed: A reassessment. Br. J. Radiol. 57:409-414.
- Shimizu, Y., Kato, H. and Schull, W. J. (1990) Life Span Study Report 11, Part II. Cancer mortality in the years 1950 85 based on the recently revised doses (DS86). Radiat. Res. 121:120-141.
- Neel, J. V., Schull, W. J., Awa, A. A., Satho, C., Kato, H. Otake, M. and Yoshimoto, Y. (1990) The children of parents exposed to atomic bombs: Estimates of the genetic doubling dose of radiation for humans. Am. J. Hum. Genet. 46:1053-1072.
- Hanis, C.L., Hewett Emmett, D., Bertin, T. K. and Schull, W. J. (1991) The origins of U. S. Hispanics: Implications for diabetes. Diabetes Care 14:618-627
