= Bruce R. Levin =

American evolutionary biologist

- Education: University of Michigan (BS, PhD)
- Known for: Population biology of bacteria Antibiotic resistance evolution Bacteriophage dynamics
- Awards: Member, National Academy of Sciences (2012); Fellow, American Academy of Arts and Sciences (2004); Member, Royal Swedish Academy of Sciences (2004)
- Scientific career
- Fields: Evolutionary biology Population genetics Microbiology
- Workplaces: Emory University; University of Massachusetts Amherst; Brown University
- Doctoral advisor: William Schull

Bruce R. Levin is an American evolutionary biologist known for his contributions to the population and evolutionary biology of bacteria, bacteriophages, and infectious disease. He is the Samuel Candler Dobbs Professor of Biology at Emory University and was elected to the National Academy of Sciences in 2012. He was among the early researchers to establish bacteria as experimentally tractable systems for testing ecological and evolutionary theory in real time.

== Education and career ==
Levin received his PhD in genetics from the University of Michigan in 1967 under William "Jack" Schull. He held faculty positions at Brown University and the University of Massachusetts Amherst before joining Emory University in 1992.

== Research ==
Levin's research integrates theoretical and experimental approaches to study the population biology and evolution of bacteria and their viruses. He has employed mathematical and computer simulation models together with laboratory experiments to investigate ecological and evolutionary processes in microbial systems.

Early in his career, Levin demonstrated that multiple strains of Escherichia coli could coexist on a single limiting resource, challenging prevailing ecological theory. He also contributed to understanding the genetic structure and diversity of natural bacterial populations, including evidence for limited recombination in E. coli. He subsequently developed experimental systems combining bacterial cultures and bacteriophages with mathematical models to test hypotheses in evolutionary biology.

Levin's work has contributed to understanding the evolution of virulence, including the concept of short-sighted evolution in pathogens, and the population dynamics of infectious disease. He has also studied antibiotic treatment strategies and the evolution of resistance, including work on the fitness costs of resistance mutations and the role of compensatory evolution in maintaining resistant populations. His work has helped characterize how evolutionary and ecological principles can address biomedical questions, including host–pathogen coevolution and the dynamics of infectious disease.

More recently, his research has examined the evolutionary dynamics of CRISPR-Cas systems and their role in bacterial immunity and gene exchange. His work has combined mathematical modeling with experimental studies to investigate the conditions under which CRISPR-mediated immunity is maintained in microbial populations. He has also contributed to theoretical analyses of the ecological and evolutionary roles of CRISPR-Cas systems in natural microbial populations.

== Honors and awards ==
He was elected to the American Academy of Arts and Sciences and the Royal Swedish Academy of Sciences, both in 2004. Levin was elected to the National Academy of Sciences in 2012.
