= John William Scholl =

American poet, scholar, and genealogist (1869–1952)

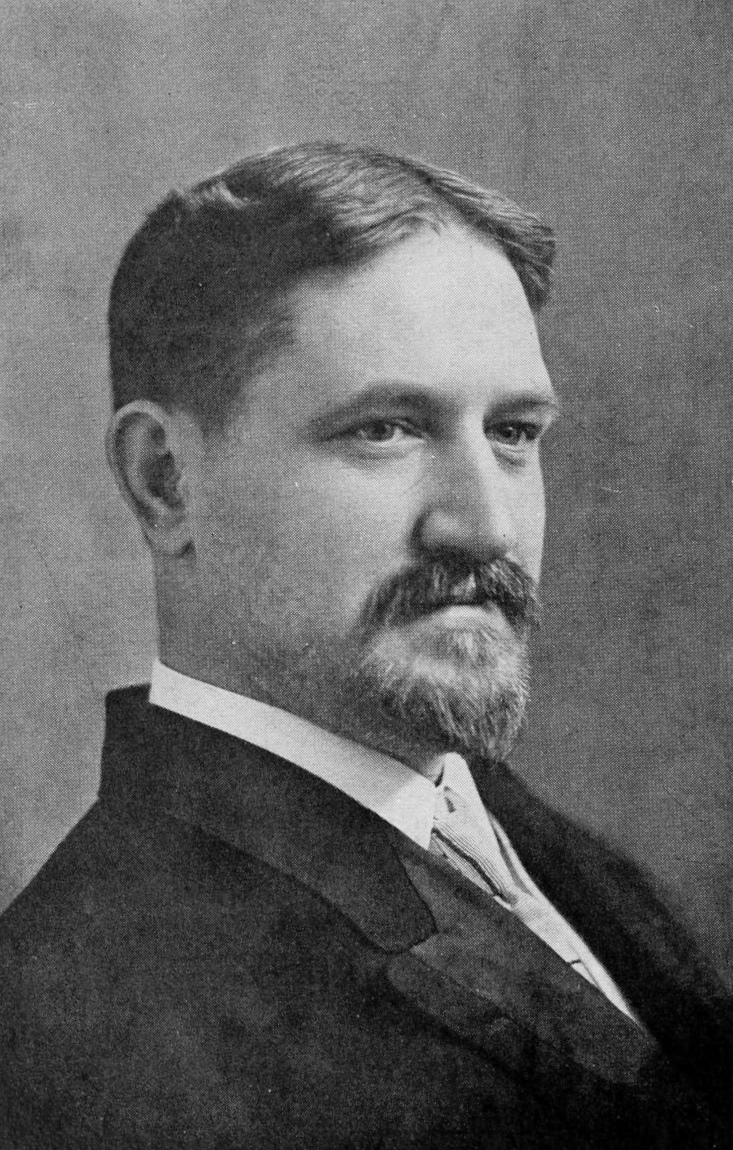
- Born: August 17, 1869
- Died: September 2, 1952 (aged 83)
- Known for: Poetry and genealogy
- Scientific career
- Fields: German literature
- Institutions: University of Michigan

John William Scholl (August 17, 1869 – September 2, 1952) was an American poet, scholar of German literature, and genealogist. He authored several volumes of poetry as well as the genealogical study Scholl, Sholl, Shull Genealogy: The Colonial Branches (1930). He was a member of the Shull family of scholars that included plant geneticist George Harrison Shull and botanist Charles Albert Shull.

== Early life and family ==
Scholl was born on August 17, 1869, near North Hampton in Clark County, Ohio, the son of Harrison Shull and Catherine (Ryman) Shull. He was one of eight children in the Shull family, which produced several notable scientists. Although born with the surname Shull, he later adopted the spelling Scholl. According to his own account, he chose the spelling while teaching German because it reflected an earlier form of the family name used before the family's migration to Ohio.

Scholl grew up in a rural farming household where books were scarce. He later wrote that the acquisition of a Webster's dictionary and a set of Chambers's Encyclopedia helped stimulate his pursuit of literature and learning.

== Education and academic career ==
After working as a teacher, Scholl matriculated at Valparaiso College in January 1894. While there, he supported himself in part through teaching, including German, physics, and chemistry. In 1897 he joined the faculty of Chattanooga Normal University as professor of modern languages and higher mathematics.

He later entered graduate study at the University of Michigan, where he received the degrees of A.B. and A.M. before completing a Ph.D. in 1905. His dissertation was titled Friedrich Schlegel and Goethe, 1790-1802. He subsequently remained at the University of Michigan, where he advanced through the ranks to associate professor of German.

Scholl was elected to Phi Beta Kappa and was active in scholarly organizations including the Modern Language Association, the Michigan Academy, the Research Club of Michigan, and the Modern Humanities Research Association of England.

== Literary work ==
Scholl began writing verse in his teenage years, and poetry remained a central part of his intellectual life. His published works include The Light-Bearer of Liberty (1899), Social Tragedies and Other Poems (1900), Ode to the Russian People (1907), Hesper-phosphor and Other Poems (1910), and Children of the Sun: Poems (1916).

== Public activity ==
During World War I, Scholl was active in public advocacy related to American war mobilization. According to his genealogical memoir, he lectured for the National Security League and the War Preparedness Board of Michigan, served as a delegate of the University of Michigan to the Congress of Service of the National Security League in Chicago in February 1918, and was a member of the American Protective League during the war period. Scholl wrote public commentary during World War I, including the letter "Enemies of Americanism", published in The New York Times on August 12, 1917; he later stated that the letter was translated into French and German.

== Genealogical research ==
Beginning in 1913, Scholl undertook extensive research into the history of the Scholl, Sholl, and Shull families. This work culminated in Scholl, Sholl, Shull Genealogy: The Colonial Branches (1930), a substantial genealogical study documenting descendants of early colonial ancestors and discussing the historical variations in the family surname.

== Selected works ==
Scholl published several collections of poetry and other works.

- The Light-Bearer of Liberty. Boston: Eastern Publishing Company, 1899.
- Social Tragedies and Other Poems. Boston: Eastern Publishing Company, 1900.
- Hesper-Phosphor and Other Poems. Ann Arbor, Michigan: G. Wahr, 1910.
- Children of the Sun: Poems. Ann Arbor, Michigan: Arts and Letters, 1916.
- Scholl, Sholl, Shull Genealogy: The Colonial Branches. 1930.

== See also ==
- George Harrison Shull
- Charles Albert Shull
- Aaron Franklin Shull
- J. Marion Shull
