= Paul Gordon Jarvis =

Scottish ecologist

Paul Jarvis FRS FRSE
- Born: Paul Gordon Jarvis; 23 May 1935; Tunbridge Wells, Kent
- Died: 5 February 2013 (aged 77); Aberfeldy, Scotland
- Education: University of Oxford (BA); University of Sheffield (PhD); Uppsala University (PhD)
- Spouse: Margaret
- Children: Three
- Awards: FRS (1997); FRSE (1979)
- Scientific career
- Fields: Plant physiology; Plant ecology
- Workplaces: CSIRO; University of Aberdeen; University of Edinburgh
- Theses: Growth and regeneration of Quercus petraea (Matt.) Liebl. in the Sheffield region (1960); Comparative studies in plant water relations (1963)

Paul Gordon Jarvis (23 May 1935 – 5 February 2013) FRS FRSE was a leading ecologist and Professor of Forestry and Natural Resources at the University of Edinburgh from 1975 to 2001.

== Education ==
Jarvis was educated at Oriel College, Oxford graduating with a Bachelor of Arts degree in Botany in 1957. He went to graduate school at the University of Sheffield where he was awarded a PhD in 1960 for research on the growth and regeneration of Irish oak Quercus petraea. Funded by a NATO scholarship, he moved to Uppsala University where he was awarded a second doctorate in plant physiology in 1963.

== Career and research ==
In 1964 he moved to Australia, where he did postdoctoral research at the Commonwealth Scientific and Industrial Research Organisation (CSIRO). He returned to the United Kingdom in 1966, where he worked at the University of Aberdeen for nine years until 1975, and then at the University of Edinburgh for twenty six years where he was a Professor until his retirement in 2001.

Jarvis research interests were in plant ecology and plant physiology. He demonstrated the link between forests and the atmosphere using novel techniques for measuring leaf water potential and stomatal conductance. He is the author, co-author or editor of several textbooks and monographs including The carbon balance of forest biomes with Howard Griffiths.

== Awards and honours ==
Jarvis was elected a Fellow of the Royal Society (FRS) in 1997. His certificate of election reads:

Professor Jarvis has made a unique contribution to plant ecology by elucidating the dependence of transpiration and photosynthesis on physiological and environmental factors over a wide range of scales from cellular to regional. He was one of the first to develop rigorous schemes for the movement and storage of water in plants and for the resistances and potential gradients that determine the diffusion of water vapour and carbon dioxide within leaves. He developed a formula expressing the dependence of stomatal conductance on weather and soil factors that has been widely used by other workers. He was a pioneer in measuring photosynthesis and respiration in a forest stand and in estimating CO₂ fluxes as a function of light transmission and interception. Currently, he is a prominent leader of internationally-planned research on biological aspects of climate change, in particular, the impact of raised levels of CO₂ on forest photosynthesis, on carbon accumulation in forests, and on feedback between vegetation and the atmosphere.

In 1978, Jarvis was a founding member of the influential peer reviewed scientific journal Plant, Cell & Environment with David Jennings a mycologist at the University of Liverpool; John Raven, a botanist at the University of Dundee; Harry Smith at the University of Nottingham and the publisher Bob Campbell at Blackwell Scientific publications. He served on the editorial board of Photosynthetica, was the President of the Society for Experimental Biology from 1993 to 1995 and a Commissioner of the Countryside Commission for Scotland. He was also an elected Fellow of the Royal Society of Edinburgh in 1979, the Royal Swedish Academy of Agriculture and Forestry, the Institute of Chartered Foresters and the Institute of Biology.

== Personal life ==
Jarvis met his wife Margaret while they were both undergraduates at Oxford, they had three children.
