= Howard Griffiths (scientist) =

- Born: 1953 (age 71–72)
- Scientific career
- Fields: Plant Physiological Ecology
- Institutions: University of Cambridge; University of Dundee
- Website: www.plantsci.cam.ac.uk/research/howardgriffiths

Howard Griffiths is a physiological ecologist. He is professor of plant ecology in the Department of Plant Sciences at the University of Cambridge, and a Fellow of Clare College, Cambridge. He formerly worked for the University of Dundee in the Department of Biological Sciences. He applies molecular biology techniques and physiology to investigate the regulation of photosynthesis and plant water-use efficiency.

== Research ==
Griffiths' specializations include:

- Responses to climate change, reflected by his membership of the Cambridge Centre for Climate Science (CCfCS).
- Global food security, a University of Cambridge Research Theme.
- Conservation and bioenergy crops, through his membership to the Cambridge Conservation Initiative.

Griffiths has a particular interest in introducing the dynamics of plant processes without the need for time-lapse photography. His lectures demonstrate how the spatial segregation of photosystem 1 and photosystem 2 creates a highly dynamic system with lateral mobility and migration of damaged photosynthetic reaction centers through thylakoid membranes.

He studies the reaction mechanism of RuBisCO and how plants have evolved. His primary focus being the types of "carbon dioxide concentrating mechanisms" (CCMs) which enhance the operating efficiency of RuBisCO and thereby carbon dioxide fixation. CCMs of interest include crassulacean acid metabolism (CAM), the biochemical C_{4} pathway, and the biophysical CCM found within algae, cyanobacteria and hornworts.

He uses stable isotopes of carbon and oxygen to compare how different types of plants have evolved their own methods of photosynthesis. Study of these isotopes can also analyse the water use of plants and insects.

He collaborated on an international project investigating the possibility of introducing the algal CCM into terrestrial plants called the Combining Algal and Plant Photosynthesis project (CAPP). In 2016, they achieved successful results and they now hope to implement this technique to increase the rate of photosynthesis in plants and hence increase crop yields.

His goal in his work is not only to discover new molecular and ecological insights but then use those insights to sustain plant diversity and combat climate change.

As part of his work, Griffiths has been a visiting research fellow to the Australian National University in 2006 and 2008. He is part of peer review for the National Environmental Research Council. He has also conducted many field work expeditions to countries including Trinidad, Venezuela, and Panama, as part of his research.

As of 2021, his projects focus on:

- "Food security: sustainability and equality in crop production systems" - in collaboration with the Global Food Security Interdisciplinary Research Centre
- "Defining the algal chloroplast pyrenoid" - a continuation of his RuBisCO work.
- "Carbon assimilation and hydraulic constraints in C3, C4 and CAM systems"
- "Epiphyte environmental interactions and climate change" - focussing on samples collected during field work

=== Publications ===
Griffiths has a blog documenting his and his students' research in physiological ecology.

He is the author, co-author or editor of several textbooks and monographs, including The Carbon Balance of Forest Biomes with Paul Gordon Jarvis.

According to Google Scholar and Scopus, his most highly cited peer-reviewed publications were in The Journal of Experimental Botany, Oecologia, New Phytologist, and Functional Plant Biology.
