= Plant, Cell & Environment =

- Discipline: Plant sciences
- Language: English
- Edited by: Jinxing Lin and Christine Foyer

Publication details
- History: 1978-present
- Publisher: Wiley-Blackwell
- Frequency: Monthly
- Impact factor: 7.947 (2021)

Standard abbreviations
- ISO 4: Plant Cell Environ.

Indexing
- CODEN: PLCEDV
- ISSN: 0140-7791 (print); 1365-3040 (web)
- LCCN: sn80010950
- OCLC no.: 782071684

Links
- Journal homepage; Online access; Online archive

Plant, Cell & Environment is a monthly peer-reviewed scientific journal published by Wiley-Blackwell. The co-editors-in-chief since 2024 are Jinxing Lin (Beijing Forestry University) and Christine Foyer (University of Birmingham).

== History ==
The journal was established in 1978 by editor-in-chief Harry Smith (University of Nottingham), together with Paul Gordon Jarvis (University of Aberdeen), David Jennings (University of Liverpool), John Raven (University of Dundee), and Bob Campbell (Blackwell Scientific). The editor-in-chief from 2018 to 2023 was Anna Amtmann (University of Glasgow).

== Abstracting and indexing ==
The journal is abstracted and indexed in:

- AGRICOLA
- Biological Abstracts
- BIOSIS Previews
- CABI databases
- Current Contents/Agriculture, Biology & Environmental Sciences
- Current Contents/Life Sciences (Thomson Reuters)
- EBSCO databases
- Elsevier Biobase/Current Awareness in Biological Sciences
- Index Medicus/MEDLINE/PubMed
- InfoTrac
- ProQuest databases
- Science Citation Index
- Scopus

According to the Journal Citation Reports, the journal has a 2021 impact factor of 7.947.
