= Yiping Qi =

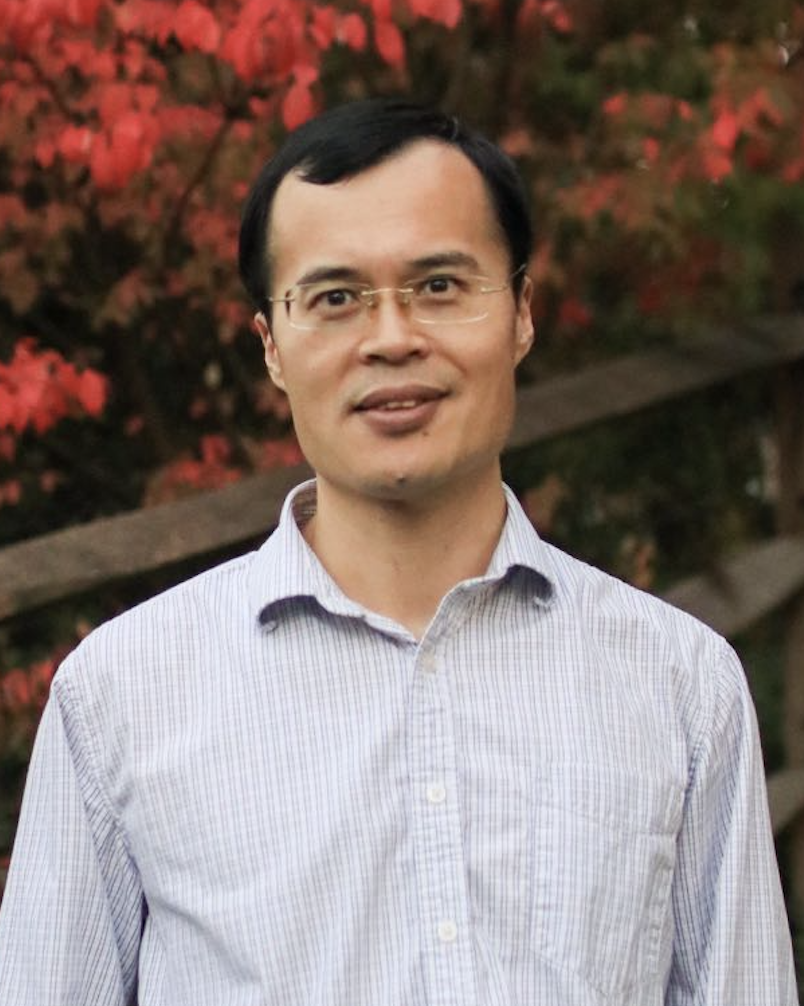
- Occupations: Plant genome engineer, synthetic biologist, and academic

Academic background
- Education: Nankai University; Shanghai Jiao Tong University; University of Minnesota
- Thesis: Purification and characterization of protein complexes containing the Arabidopsis disease resistance protein RPS2 (2009)

Academic work
- Institutions: University of Maryland, College Park

Yiping Qi is a plant genome engineer, a synthetic biologist, and an academic. He is a professor at the University of Maryland, College Park.

Qi's research has focused on plant genome engineering, including both tool development and applications in crops. He is a recipient of the 2018 Early Career Award from the Plant Genome Research Program of the National Science Foundation and the 2021 UMD Invention of the Year in Life Sciences from the University of Maryland.

== Education ==
Qi completed his B.S. in Microbiology at Nankai University in 2000. In 2003, he earned a M.S. in Biochemistry and Molecular Biology from Shanghai Jiao Tong University. Later, he obtained a Ph.D. in Plant Biological Sciences from the University of Minnesota in 2009.

== Career ==
Qi began his career as an assistant professor at East Carolina University from 2013 to 2016. In 2017, he joined the University of Maryland, College Park as an assistant professor. He remained in that role until 2020, when he was promoted to associate professor. Later in 2023, he was appointed as a professor there.

Beyond academics, Qi has worked as the chair of Plant Biotechnology section of Society of In Vitro Biology (SIVB) for terms 2024 to 2026 and 2026 to 2028. He also worked on the editorial boards of academic journals, including associate editor for Plant Biotechnology Journal and section editor for Plant Cell Reports. His laboratory has deposited research materials in the public plasmid repository Addgene.

== Research ==
Qi's research has focused on the development and application of genome editing technologies, particularly CRISPR-based systems, in plant science. His work has centered on engineering plant genomes to enable crop improvement. His research has explored RNA-guided nucleases such as CRISPR/Cas12a and CRISPR/Cas9 as versatile tools for targeted genome modification. His research has also contributed to the improvement of genome editing methodologies like the design of efficient CRISPR systems.

Qi's work highlights the potential of CRISPR platforms to expand the range of editable genome targets, enabling systematic manipulation of plant traits. A major strand of his research is agricultural biotechnology, where he introduced CRISPR Type I systems for plant genome editing and developed genome-editing tools for crop breeding.

Qi's research has introduced alternatives to making ZFNs like the context-dependent assembly (CoDA) and explored the Golden Gate Method for the assembly of TALEN repeat arrays.

== Awards and honors ==
- 2018 – Early Career Award, National Science Foundation (NSF)
- 2018 – New Innovator Award, Foundation for Food and Agriculture Research
- 2020 – Young Scientist Award, The Society for In Vitro Biology (SIVB)
- 2021 – UMD Invention of the Year in Life Sciences, University of Maryland
- Blue Flame Award, Addgene

== Selected articles ==
- Qi, Yiping; Zhang, Yong; Zhang, Feng; Baller, Joshua A.; Cleland, Spencer C.; Ryu, Yungil; Starker, Colby G.; Voytas, Daniel F. (2013). "Increasing Frequencies of Site-Specific Mutagenesis and Gene Targeting in Arabidopsis by Manipulating DNA Repair Pathways". Genome Research. 23 (3): 547–554. doi:10.1101/gr.145557.112. PMC 3589543. PMID 23282329.
- Lowder, Levi G.; Zhang, Dengwei; Baltes, Nicholas J.; Paul, Joseph W.; Tang, Xu; Zheng, Xuelian; Voytas, Daniel F.; Hsieh, Tzung-Fu; Zhang, Yong; Qi, Yiping (2015). "A CRISPR/Cas9 Toolbox for Multiplexed Plant Genome Editing and Transcriptional Regulation". Plant Physiology. 169 (2): 971–985. Bibcode:2015PlanP.169..971L. doi:10.1104/pp.15.00636. PMC 4587453. PMID 26297141.
- Tang, Xu; Lowder, Levi G.; Zhang, Tao; Malzahn, Aimee A.; Zheng, Xuelian; Voytas, Daniel F.; Zhong, Zhaohui; Chen, Yiyi; Ren, Qiurong; Li, Qian; Kirkland, Elida R.; Zhang, Yong; Qi, Yiping (2017). "A CRISPR–Cpf1 System for Efficient Genome Editing and Transcriptional Repression in Plants". Nature Plants. 3 (3) 17018. Bibcode:2017NatPl...317018T. doi:10.1038/nplants.2017.18. PMID 28211909.
- Pan, Changtian; Wu, Xincheng; Markel, Kasey; Malzahn, Aimee A.; Kundagrami, Neil; Sretenovic, Simon; Zhang, Yingxiao; Cheng, Yanhao; Shih, Patrick M.; Qi, Yiping (2021). "CRISPR–Act3.0 for Highly Efficient Multiplexed Gene Activation in Plants". Nature Plants. 7 (7): 942–953. Bibcode:2021NatPl...7..942P. doi:10.1038/s41477-021-00953-7. PMID 34168320.
- Pan, Changtian; Li, Gen; Malzahn, Aimee A.; Cheng, Yanhao; Leyson, Benjamin; Sretenovic, Simon; Gurel, Filiz; Coleman, Gary D.; Qi, Yiping (2022). "Boosting Plant Genome Editing with a Versatile CRISPR-Combo System". Nature Plants. 8 (5): 513–525. Bibcode:2022NatPl...8..513P. doi:10.1038/s41477-022-01151-9. PMID 35596077.
- Zhou, Jianping; Liu, Guanqing; Zhao, Yuxin; Zhang, Rui; Tang, Xu; Li, Ling; Jia, Xinyu; Guo, Yachong; Wu, Yuechao; Han, Yangshuo; Bao, Yu; He, Yao; Han, Qinqin; Yang, Han; Zheng, Xuelian; Qi, Yiping; Zhang, Tao; Zhang, Yong (2023). "An Efficient CRISPR–Cas12a Promoter Editing System for Crop Improvement". Nature Plants. 9 (4): 588–604. Bibcode:2023NatPl...9..588Z. doi:10.1038/s41477-023-01384-2. PMID 37024659.
- Tuncel, Aytug; Pan, Changtian; Clem, Joshua S.; Liu, Degao; Qi, Yiping (2025). "CRISPR–Cas Applications in Agriculture and Plant Research". Nature Reviews Molecular Cell Biology. 26 (6): 419–441. doi:10.1038/s41580-025-00834-3. PMID 40055491.
