= Noel Michele Holbrook =

American plant physiologist

Noel Michele Holbrook is the Charles Bullard Professor of Forestry in the department of Organismic and Evolutionary Biology at Harvard University. Her work primarily focuses on the study of the physiology of vascular transport in plants, with the intent of understanding the impact of the movement of water and solutes on the ecological and evolutionary processes.

== Education ==
Holbrook received her A.B in Biology from Harvard University in 1983. In 1989, she received her Masters of Science in botany from the University of Florida and she received her Ph.D. in Biological Sciences from Stanford University in 1995.

== Relevant collaborations ==
Noel Michele Holbrook became a Charles Bullard Professor of Forestry for the Department of Organismic and Evolutionary Biology at Harvard University in 2006. The Charles Bullard Fellowship in Forest Research was designed to support the advanced research by scholars or administrators who show promise in making important contributions to the field of forestry or forestry-related subjects, which include biology.

Since July 2020, she has been Interim Director of Harvard Forest. She is also an instructor for the Harvard Life Science Outreach Program, which works to train teachers and hands-on laboratories to provide experiences for students in New England, and she has been a contributing author to several Biology and Environmental Science textbooks.

== Research accomplishments ==
Holbrook has received the Starr-Friedman Challenge Grant or Scientific Research from Harvard University, was given to her for her studies of the impact that CO_{2} has on bees and pollination. She also received a U.S. AFOSR grant for her work relating to the study of thermal management in plants.

== Contributions to the field ==
Holbrook has been a member of the executive committee of the David Rockefeller Center for Latin American Studies. She has also been on the editorial board of Plant Physiology, and a member of the Scientific Advisory Board for DISTAP (Singapore-MIT Alliance for Research and Technology). Among her publications is Maintenance of Carbohydrate Transport in Tall Trees (2017), and Combined Influence of Soil Moisture and Atmospheric Evaporative Demand is Important for Accurately Predicting US Maize Yields (2020).
