= Kyonoshin Maruyama =

Japanese functional genomicist

Kyonoshin Maruyama is a Japanese researcher of functional genomics who works at the Japan International Research Center for Agricultural Sciences and has published numerous of his peer-reviewed articles in such journals as Plant Physiology and various proceedings such as the Proceedings of the National Academy of Sciences of the United States of America and Proceedings of the National Academy of Sciences, among others. His most cited article has received 622 citations.
