= Plant Direct =

Open-access scientific journal in plant science

- Cover of Plant Direct
- Discipline: Plant science
- Language: English
- Edited by: Richard Haslam

Publication details
- History: 2017–present
- Publisher: John Wiley & Sons (United States)
- Frequency: Monthly
- Open access: Yes
- Impact factor: 2.3 (2024)

Standard abbreviations
- ISO 4: Plant Direct

Indexing
- ISSN: 2475-4455
- OCLC no.: 966642061

Links
- Journal homepage

Plant Direct is a peer-reviewed open-access scientific journal covering research in plant science. It was established in 2017 and is published by John Wiley & Sons in collaboration with the American Society of Plant Biologists and the Society for Experimental Biology.

The journal publishes research across a range of areas in plant biology, including genetics, development, physiology, and genomics.

== History ==
Plant Direct was published in 2017 as a collaboration between the American Society of Plant Biologists, the Society for Experimental Biology, and Wiley. In its first editorial, editor-in-chief Ivan Baxter described the journal as focusing on the publication of “sound science,” with manuscripts of technical quality and the extent to which conclusions are supported by data rather than perceived impact.

Plant Direct is associated with the American Society of Plant Biologists, alongside Plant Physiology and The Plant Cell, with which it shares manuscript transfer systems.

== Scope and publishing model ==
The journal operates as an online-only, open-access publication. It uses a peer-review model in which submissions are assessed for methodological soundness and adherence to ethical and reporting standards. In addition to direct submissions, the journal accepts transferred manuscripts from partner journals, sometimes including prior peer reviews.
