= Association of Applied Biologists =

British scientific organization

- Abbreviation: AAB
- Type: Scientific association
- Legal status: Charity
- Purpose: Educational
- Headquarters: Wellesbourne
- Location: Warwickshire, United Kingdom
- Members: Worldwide
- Official language: EN
- President of the Association: Mike Gooding
- Affiliations: Society of Biology
- Formerly called: Association of Economic Biologists

The Association of Applied Biologists (AAB) is a United Kingdom biological science learned society. From its foundation in 1904 until 1934, the institution was the Association of Economic Biologists. It publishes research and holds conferences in different specialisms of applied biology.

== History ==
The AAB was founded in 1904 as the Association of Economic Biologists for workers in applied biology "to discuss new discoveries, to exchange experiences and carefully consider the best methods of work" and "promote and advance the science of Economic Biology in its agricultural, horticultural, medical and commercial aspects." "Within 10 years of its foundation, the association became the recognised society for all British workers interested in applied biology. Since then, the association has steadily expanded its knowledge." In 1934, the current title of Association of Applied Biologists was adopted. With some 900 members from a wide range of specialisms in the UK and overseas, "it has developed a portfolio of scientific publications and annual conference programme to achieve its objectives and promote the subject of applied biology."

The AAB organises conferences with universities specialising in agriculture and other aspects of applied biology, these have included Aberystwyth, Cambridge, Edinburgh, Newcastle, Nottingham, Reading and Illinois. It has working relationships with research institutes in agriculture, such as James Hutton Institute, the John Innes Centre and the Rothamsted Experimental Station. Papers published by the AAB are cited by governmental departments including Department for Environment, Food and Rural Affairs, Food and Environment Research Agency, Scottish Agricultural Science Agency and Biotechnology and Biological Sciences Research Council.

=== Aims ===
The aims of the AAB are "To promote the study and advancement of all branches of Biology and in particular (but without prejudice to the generality of the foregoing), to foster the practice, growth and development of applied biology, including the application of biological sciences for the production and preservation of food, fibre and other materials and for the maintenance and improvement of earth's physical environment."

== Management ==
=== Specialist groups ===
The AAB caters for specialist interests in applied biology through its group structure.

- Applied Plant Pathology
- Applied Tree and Forest Biology
- Biological Control and Integrated Pest Management
- Cropping and the Environment
- Food Systems
- Horticultural Quality and Food Loss
- Nematology
- Pesticide Application
- PlantEd: Genome Editing in Plants
- Plant Physiology and Crop Improvement
- Soil and Root Biology
- Virology

Each group has a convenor who organises meetings of the group members, drawn from industry, research organisations and academia, to plan future conferences and other activities. This structure ensures that the final programme will be relevant to the membership and also to the needs of industry. The annual programme is assembled by a programme secretary who presents conference plans on a regular basis for approval by Council.

=== President and Council ===
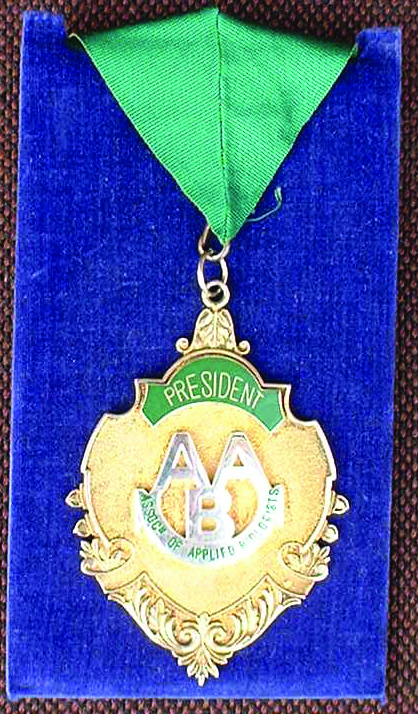
AAB President's chain of honour

The AAB is managed by an executive who reports to the council consisting of elected executive members and the Convenors of the Specialist Subject groups. Executive meets as required and council meets three times a year and reports to all members through the AGM. The president and vice president (president-elect) are elected at the AGM and serve a two-year term.

The current president is Professor Mike Gooding, and the president-elect is Professor Dale Saunders. Previous presidents have been:

List of presidents
Terms	Presidents
2025–2026	D. Saunders
2023–2024	M. Gooding
2021–2022	C. Foyer
2019–2020	S. Knight
2017–2018	C. Watson
2015–2016	B. Davies
2013–2014	P. Shewry
2011–2012	T.J. Hocking
2009–2010	M. Jeger
2007–2008	P.J. Lea
2005–2006	B.R. Kerry
2002–2004	A.R. Thompson
2001–2002	H. van Emden
1999–2000	C. Duffus
1997–1998	J. Moorby
1995–1996	C.C. Payne
1993–1994	N.L. Innes
1992	Y. Robert
1991	G.M. Milbourn
1990	D. Gareth Jones
1989	C.E. Taylor
1988	I.J. Graham-Bryce
1987	D.S.H. Drennan
1986	G.A. Wheatley
1985	Gillian Thorne
1984	M.J. Way
1982–1983	F.G.H. Lupton
1981	J.K.A. Bleasdale
1980–1981	B.D. Harrison
1966–1967	Sir Vincent Wigglesworth
1945–1946	Carrington Bonsor Williams
1938–1940	C H Gimingham
1928–1929	Edwin John Butler
1920–1921	Sir David Prain

== Publications ==
The association has two peer-reviewed scientific journals: Annals of Applied Biology, owned by the Association and published by Wiley-Blackwell, Plant Biotechnology Journal, which is co-owned with the Society for Experimental Biology and Wiley-Blackwell. The Journals of the Association have Editorial Offices in Wellesbourne.

Alongside its conferences, the AAB has produced various publications including Aspects of Applied Biology, the database CD ROM Descriptions of Plant Viruses, and a regular newsletter with articles of topical interest, reports and announcements. In addition, the AAB produced a centenary book in 2004 to celebrate this milestone. As well as chronicling the history of the association, the book also contains a message from the Queen's Office and a foreword by the 2004 President of the Royal Society, Lord May of Oxford.

== Conferences ==
The AAB organises conferences to disseminate the latest developments in applied biology, providing a source of information for both the industry and its members. These are mainly held in Europe, particularly in the UK. Recent international conferences have been held in the US, the Netherlands and Ireland. Every autumn the Association holds an online Annual General Meeting (AGM), in line with its requirements by the Charity Commission for England and Wales.

The AAB also holds a succession of conferences in its specialist subjects throughout the year, as outlined in the conference calendar on the official AAB website. These meetings may take the form of residential conferences, one day meetings or training workshops. Most attract BASIS points, showing their relevance to the agricultural industry. It has close links with other learned Societies and professional bodies and frequently organises conferences with or for their appropriate groups, often publishing Aspects of Applied Biology on their behalf. Conferences are widely advertised and schemes exist to support attendance by research students and researchers from overseas.
