= David MacLennan =

Canadian medical researcher (1937–2020)

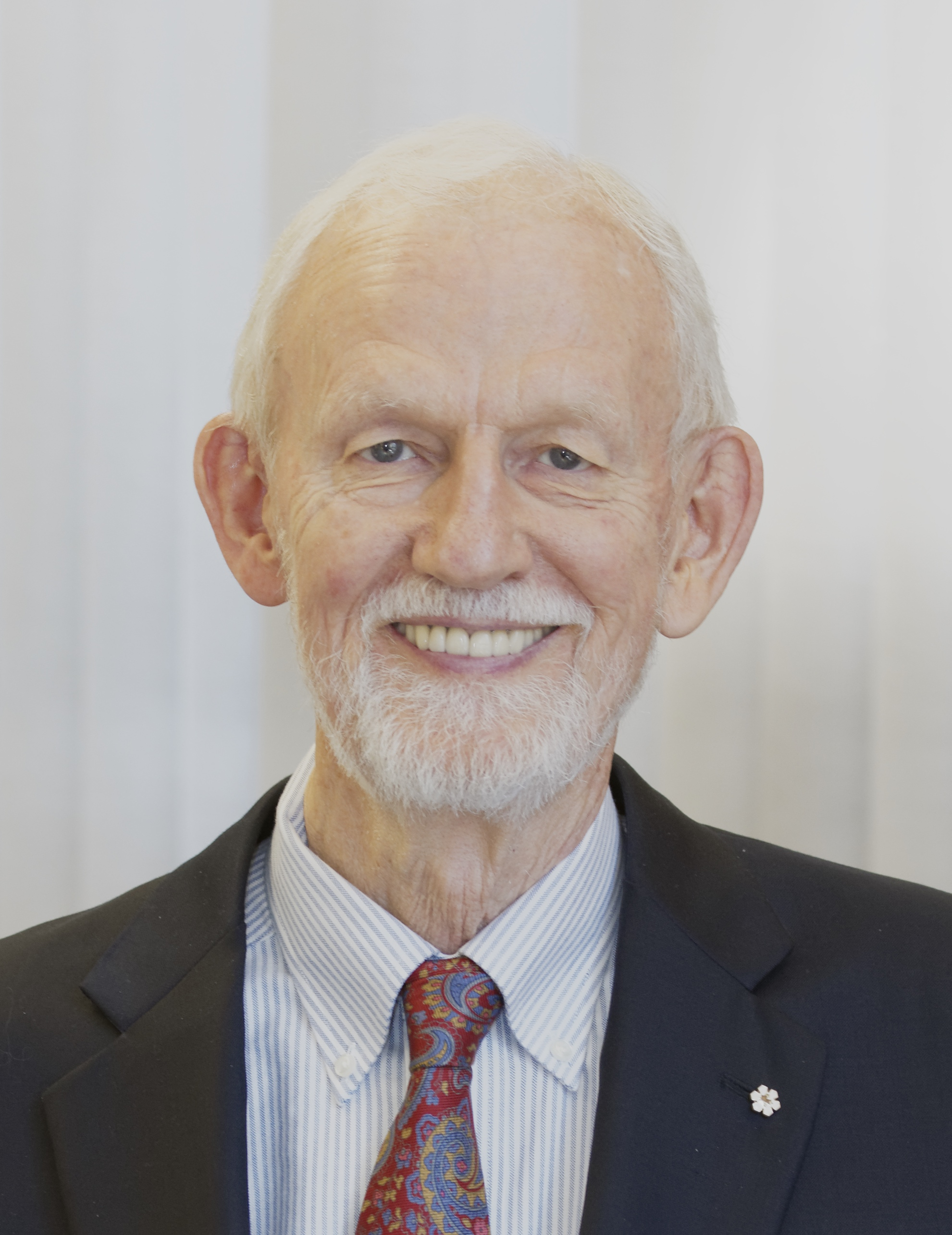
- Born: July 3, 1937; Swan River, Manitoba, Canada
- Died: June 24, 2020 (aged 82); Toronto, Ontario, Canada
- Education: University of Manitoba (B.S.A.); Purdue University (M.S., Ph.D.)
- Scientific career
- Fields: Biochemistry, Genetics
- Institutions: University of Toronto
- Thesis: Compartmentation of organic acids in plant tissues (1963)
- Doctoral advisor: Harry Beevers

David Herman MacLennan OC OOnt FRS FRSC (July 3, 1937 - June 24, 2020) was a Canadian biochemist and geneticist known for his basic work on proteins that regulate calcium flux through the sarcoplasmic reticulum (SR), thereby regulating muscle contraction and relaxation, and for his discoveries in the field of muscle diseases caused by genetic defects in calcium regulatory proteins.

Born in Swan River, Manitoba, to Douglas MacLennan and Sigriður Sigurðardóttir, he received a BSA from the University of Manitoba in 1959 and a DSc (hc) in 2001. He received MS (1961) and PhD (1963) degrees from Purdue University under Harry Beevers, and was then a postdoctoral fellow (1963–1964) under David E. Green and an assistant professor (1964–1968) at the University of Wisconsin–Madison. In 1969, he was appointed associate professor in the Banting and Best Department of Medical Research and, later, professor (1974), chair (1978–1990), J. W. Billes Professor of Medical Research (1987–2007) and university professor (1993–2015).

MacLennan made fundamental contributions to our understanding of the mechanism of ion transport by SR calcium pumps, the storage of calcium in the SR by acidic lumenal proteins and the release of calcium from the SR by calcium release channels. He led teams that defined the genetic basis for the human skeletal muscle diseases, malignant hyperthermia, central core disease and Brody disease and was part of the team that demonstrated that mutations in phospholamban, a regulator of the calcium pump, can cause cardiomyopathy. His identification of a calcium release channel mutation that causes porcine stress syndrome resulted in a diagnostic test that has decreased the incidence of the disease dramatically, with substantial economic benefits to the swine industry.

== Honours and awards ==
- 1974 Ayerst Award of the Canadian Biochemical Society
- 1985 Fellow of the Royal Society of Canada
- 1990 National Lecturer Award of the Biophysical Society
- 1991 Gairdner Foundation International Award
- 1994 Fellow of the Royal Society of London
- 1997 Killam Prize (Health Sciences) of the Canada Council for the Arts
- 2000 Royal Society Glaxo Wellcome Prize, Medal and Lecture
- 2001 Fellow of the International Society for Heart Research
- 2001 Foreign Associate of the National Academy of Sciences USA
- 2001 Honorary Doctor of Science, University of Manitoba
- 2001 Officer of the Order of Canada
- 2004 Honorary Member of the Japanese Biochemical Society
- 2009 Member of the Order of Ontario
- 2013 Member of the Canadian Medical Hall of Fame
- 2015 Foreign Honorary Member American Academy of Arts and Sciences
