= Martin Gibbs =

- Born: November 11, 1922; Philadelphia, Pennsylvania, U.S.
- Died: July 24, 2006 (aged 83)
- Education: University of the Sciences in Philadelphia; University of Illinois at Urbana-Champaign
- Known for: Research on carbon metabolism and photosynthesis; Editor-in-Chief of Plant Physiology (1963–1992)
- Awards: Member, National Academy of Sciences (1974); Charles Reid Barnes Award; Alexander von Humboldt Fellowship
- Scientific career
- Fields: Biochemistry
- Workplaces: Brookhaven National Laboratory; Cornell University; Brandeis University

Martin Gibbs (November 11, 1922 – July 24, 2006) was an American biochemist known for his research on photosynthesis and plant carbon metabolism, particularly the use of radiolabeled carbon (¹⁴C) to elucidate pathways of sugar metabolism in plants. He served as editor-in-chief of Plant Physiology from 1963 to 1992 and was elected to the National Academy of Sciences in 1974. The American Society of Plant Biologists later established the Martin Gibbs Medal in recognition of his contributions to plant science.

== Early life and education ==
Gibbs was born in Philadelphia, Pennsylvania. He earned his undergraduate degree from the Philadelphia College of Pharmacy and received his Ph.D. in biochemistry from the University of Illinois at Urbana-Champaign in 1947.

== Scientific career ==
After completing his doctorate, Gibbs joined Brookhaven National Laboratory, where he began research using carbon-14 tracers to investigate photosynthetic carbon metabolism. His work contributed to the elucidation of sugar phosphate pathways and helped clarify aspects of the Calvin cycle and related metabolic processes.

In 1957, he joined Cornell University as professor of biochemistry. Later he moved to Brandeis University, where he served as the Abraham S. and Gertrude Berg Professor of Biology and chaired the Department of Biology.

== Editorial leadership ==
Gibbs served as editor-in-chief of Plant Physiology from 1963 to 1992. During his tenure, the journal expanded significantly in scope and influence, particularly in plant biochemistry and metabolism. His nearly three-decade leadership marked one of the longest editorial tenures in the journal’s history.

== Honors and legacy ==
Gibbs was elected a member of the National Academy of Sciences. He received numerous honors, including the Charles Reid Barnes Award and an Alexander von Humboldt Fellowship.

In 1993, the American Society of Plant Biologists established the Martin Gibbs Medal in recognition of his contributions to plant science and his service to the Society.

== Awards and honors ==
- Elected to the National Academy of Sciences (1974).
- Recipient of the Charles Reid Barnes Award (1984).
- Alexander von Humboldt Fellow.
- The American Society of Plant Biologists established the Martin Gibbs Medal in 1993 in recognition of his contributions to plant science.
- Pioneer Member of the American Society of Plant Biologists.
