= American Society of Plant Biologists =

Professional organization for plant biologists

- Founded: 1924
- Founder: Rodney Beecher Harvey
- Type: 501(c)(3) organization
- Headquarters: 15501 Monona Drive, Rockville, MD 20855
- Location: International membership
- President: Kent Chapman (2025–2026)
- Website: aspb.org
- Formerly called: American Society of Plant Physiologists

The American Society of Plant Biologists (ASPB) is a non-profit professional society for research and education in plant science. It was founded in 1924 as the American Society of Plant Physiologists (ASPP); the name was changed in 2001. Membership in the society is open to any person from any country who deals with physiology, molecular biology, environmental biology, cell biology and plant biophysics or related issues. It has over 4,000 members worldwide.

The society publishes the peer-reviewed journals Plant Physiology (1926–) and The Plant Cell (1989–) as well as ASPB News. The American Society of Plant Biologists also has partnered with the Society for Experimental Biology, and John Wiley & Sons to publish an online-only science journal Plant Direct. In 2000, it published the first edition of the textbook Biochemistry & Molecular Biology of Plants.

The first President of the Society was Charles Albert Shull (1924–1925), with founder R. B. Harvey as Secretary-Treasurer. Other presidents of the Society include Harry Beevers (1961–1962), Aubrey Naylor (1960–1961), and Katayoon Dehesh (2021-2022). The first woman to be president of the society was Elisabeth Gantt (1988–1989).

== Awards ==
The American Society of Plant Biologists confers several awards recognizing major contributions to plant biology, research, and service to the discipline. These include:

- The Charles Reid Barnes Life Membership Award is the oldest award of the ASPB. Established in 1925 at the Society’s first annual meeting through a gift from Charles Albert Shull, it honors plant physiologist Charles Reid Barnes. The award recognizes meritorious contributions to plant biology and confers lifetime membership in the Society.
- Stephen Hales Prize – honors the Reverend Stephen Hales for his pioneering contributions to plant biology, particularly those described in his 1727 book Vegetable Staticks. The prize is awarded annually to a member of the Society for notable contributions to plant biology. It was established in 1927, on the 250th anniversary of the birth of Stephen Hales.
- Martin Gibbs Medal was established in 1993 and honors plant biochemist Martin Gibbs, who served as editor of Plant Physiology from 1963 to 1992. The medal is awarded biennially to a scientist whose work has pioneered advances that open new directions of investigation in the plant sciences.
- Charles Albert Shull Award – established in 1971 to recognize outstanding research in plant biology by an early-career scientist; named for plant physiologist Charles Albert Shull, who played a key role in the founding of the ASPB.
- Jane Silverthorne Early Career Award – established in 2005 to recognize exceptional independent contributions by scientists in the early stages of their careers. It was renamed in 2023 to honor Jane Silverthorne.

The Society also administers numerous additional honors and fellowships recognizing achievements in research, education, mentoring, public service, and outreach in plant biology, with more than eighteen awards and programs in total.
