= Charles Reid Barnes =

American botanist (1858–1910)

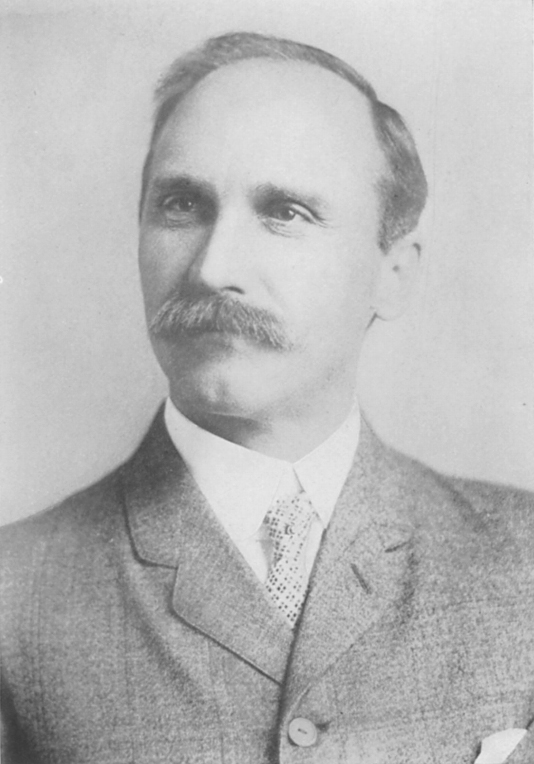
- Born: September 7, 1858; Madison, Indiana
- Died: February 24, 1910 (aged 51); Chicago, Illinois
- Scientific career
- Fields: Botany
- Author abbrev. (botany): Barnes

Charles Reid Barnes (1858–1910) was an American botanist specializing in bryophytes (mosses, liverworts and hornworts). He was co-editor of the Botanical Gazette for over 25 years.

Barnes was born at Madison, Indiana, September 7, 1858. He graduated from Hanover College in 1877, and afterward studied at Harvard University, where he became friends with Asa Gray. After teaching in public schools for a few years, he became professor of botany at Purdue University in 1882. In 1887 he was called to the University of Wisconsin, and for eleven years developed and maintained a vigorous department of botany in that institution. In 1898 he became professor of plant physiology at the University of Chicago, and completed twenty-eight years as a university professor. At Hanover College he met John Merle Coulter as his instructor in botany, and from that time they became intimately associated, first as joint editors of the Botanical Gazette, and later as colleagues in the same university.

He became a member of the American Association for the Advancement of Science in 1884 and a fellow in 1885; was secretary of the botanical section in 1894, secretary of the council in 1895, general secretary in 1896, and vice-president (chairman) of the botanical section in 1898, giving his retiring address at Columbus in 1899 on “The progress and problems of plant physiology.” He was secretary of the Botanical Society of America from its organization in 1894 to 1898, and became its president in 1903, giving his retiring address at Philadelphia in 1904 on "The theory of respiration." In 1905 he was a delegate from the botanical section of the American Association to the International Botanical Congress at Vienna.

The term 'photosynthesis' was coined by him in 1893.

In 1883 Barnes became co-editor of the Botanical Gazette, a position he held for 27 years.

Barnes died in Chicago, on February 24, 1910, from injuries sustained in an accidental fall.

== Legacy ==
The American Society of Plant Biologists established the Charles Reid Barnes Life Membership Award in 1925 to honor his contributions to plant biology.
