= Harry Beevers =

American plant physiologist (1924–2004)

- Born: January 10, 1924; Shildon, County Durham, England U.K.
- Died: April 14, 2004 (aged 80); Carmel-by-the-Sea, California, U.S.
- Citizenship: United States of America
- Education: Durham University
- Known for: Discovery of the Glyoxylate Cycle
- Spouse: Jean Sykes
- Scientific career
- Fields: Plant Physiology
- Workplaces: Oxford University; Purdue University; University of California
- Doctoral advisor: Meirion Thomas
- Doctoral students: David MacLennan

Harry Beevers (January 10, 1924 – April 14, 2004) was an English-born American plant physiologist. Beevers made major contributions to the understanding of plant metabolism and plant cell biology. Beevers is widely noted for the discovery of the glyoxylate cycle in seedlings of plants that results in the production of glucose during early seedling growth. He served as president of the American Society of Plant Physiologists. University of California called Beevers "one of the leading plant physiologists of the 20th century". Beevers was a member of the National Academy of Sciences and of the American Academy of Arts and Sciences. Beevers received honorary doctorates from Purdue University, the University of Nagoya in Japan, and Newcastle University on Tyne in England. Oxford University honored Beevers by naming a building in his name, the Harry Beevers Laboratory. Beevers received Stephen Hales Prize in 1970 and Charles Reid Barnes Life Membership Award in 1999.

== Career and life ==
=== Early life ===
Harry Beevers was born in Shildon, County Durham in the north east of England in on January 10, 1924. His parents felt strongly about the benefits of education and six of their eight children (of whom Harry was the second) went on to earn university degrees.

At the age of six the family moved to Upper Weardale where Harry attended schools in Wearhead and St. John's Chapel. He went on to attend Wolsingham Grammar School.

While at Wolsingham, Harry had aspired to become a teacher specialising in woodwork, arts and crafts. However, due to wartime shortages the school were unable to teach the courses in these fields. It was at this point he discovered science while under the tutorage of David Hughes, the school biology teacher.

=== Durham University ===
Going on to university, he graduated from King's College in Newcastle upon Tyne (then part of Durham University) with a BSc. first class honours degree in botany. The course was part of an accelerated wartime degree programme. As he was attending university during the Second World War Harry undertook fire-watching duties at night on campus. His companions included members of the faculty, among whose number was Professor Meirion Thomas. Thomas went on to become Beevers' Ph.D. mentor.

After gaining his BS.c. he received a deferment on his military service and began his doctoral research. This was completed in 1946 when he received his Ph.D. in plant physiology.

Beevers added to his student grant through beating at grouse hunts and gathering rose hips which were made into a vitamin C rich dietary supplement.

=== Oxford University ===
Harry went on to be assistant, then chief research assistant, in the laboratory of W.O. James at Oxford University. It was here that Harry looked at the biosynthesis of tropane alkaloids. Progress was hampered by the technology available so Beevers moved on to other matters. These included the high rate of respiration of the spadix of Arum maculatum. While at Oxford he also collaborated with Eric Simon which lead to the publication of an academic paper in 1952. This came from their work looking at the uptake of weak acids and weak bases by plants.

=== Purdue University ===
Realising that work opportunities were limited in the United Kingdom, Beevers secured a one-year appointment as an assistant professor at Purdue University in the Department of Biology in the United States. This position was secured through R. E. Girton, a Purdue plant physiologist who was taking a sabbatical year in W. O. James' Oxford laboratory.

In 1950, not long after his arrival in America, Harry attended his first meeting of the American Society of Plant Physiologists in Columbus, Ohio. An organisation to which he was elected President, serving the period 1961–62. It was also in this period at Purdue that he became a United States citizen.

=== University of California ===
Beevers was elected to the National Academy of Sciences in 1969, the same year Professor Kenneth Thimann a member of the Academy, persuaded Harry to join the biology department at the University of California, Santa Cruz.

=== Personal life and family ===
While at Wolsingham Grammar School, Beevers met Jean Sykes whom he married in 1949.

In 1961, Harry's brother Leonard Beevers (d. 2014) made the journey to America with his wife Pat. Also a plant physiologist where he worked on nitrogen metabolism.

=== Later life ===
Harry Beevers died at his home in Carmel, California on April 14, 2004, following a brief illness.

He was survived by his wife Jean Beevers, son Michael Beevers, sisters Win Allinson, Edna Emerson, Elsie Chapman and Vera West. Along with two brothers, Alec Beevers and Leonard Beevers. He also had and one granddaughter.
