= Barry Halliwell =

Biochemistry researcher, academic

- Born: 18 October 1948; Preston, Lancashire, England
- Education: University of Oxford
- Known for: redox, glutathione, ascorbate
- Scientific career
- Fields: Biochemistry
- Workplaces: King's College London; National University of Singapore
- Thesis: The Biochemistry of Plant Peroxisomes (1973)
- Academic advisors: Frederick Whatley
- Notable students: Christine Foyer

Barry Halliwell (born 18 October 1949) is an English biochemist, chemist and university administrator, specialising in free radical metabolism in both animals and plants. His name is included in the "Foyer–Halliwell–Asada" pathway, a cellular process of hydrogen peroxide metabolism in plants and animals, named for the three principal discoverers, with Christine Foyer and Kozi Asada. He moved to Singapore in 2000, and served as Deputy President (Research and Technology) of the National University of Singapore (2006–15), where (as of 2025) he continues to hold a Distinguished Professorship.

== Early life and education ==
Born in Preston, Lancashire in 1949, Halliwell was educated at Preston Grammar School. He attended St Catherine's College, University of Oxford (1968–71), achieving a BA with First Class (honours) in biochemistry. He was also awarded the Rose Prize for the best final papers of any candidate in biological sciences. His D.Phil in plant biochemistry was also at Oxford, supervised by Frederick R. Whatley and Vernon Butt; his thesis was entitled "The biochemistry of plant peroxisomes" (1973). He was later awarded a D.Sc from the University of London for his work on the biochemistry of free radical reactions in plant and animal systems.

== Career and writing ==
After leaving Oxford, Halliwell briefly lectured at the Portsmouth Polytechnic (1973–74). He took up a position as lecturer at King's College London in 1974, remaining there until 2000, rising to the position of Professor of Medical Biochemistry in the Division of Pharmacology. He also simultaneously held a visiting professorship at the University of California, Davis, United States (1995–99). After a 1998 sabbatical at the National University of Singapore (NUS), he moved there in 2000 as chair of the biochemistry department. As of 2018 he is a professor in the department of biochemistry at the NUS Yong Loo Lin School of Medicine. Halliwell is currently the Senior Advisor, Academic Appointments and Research Excellence, Office of the Provost, at the National University of Singapore (NUS). He is also Chairman of the Biomedical Research Advisory Council (BMAC), Agency for Science, Technology & Research (A*STAR).

Halliwell served as the NUS's first Deputy President (Research and Technology) in 2006–15, founding the Graduate School for Integrative Sciences and Engineering, and overseeing a more than doubling in the university's research grants and the creation at NUS of Singapore's first Research Centre of Excellence (RCEs). He was subsequently appointed Senior Advisor to the NUS President.

His textbook, Free Radicals in Biology and Medicine, co-written with John M. C. Gutteridge, is considered "an authoritative text in the field". His work is highly cited; in 2011, eight of his research articles had each received over a thousand citations, and his Hirsch Index is 174 (Based on Scopus, May 2025).

== Research ==
Halliwell is known for his work on the control of free radicals in biological systems. His earliest research was in plants, where with Christine Foyer and others in 1976, he discovered the glutathione–ascorbate cycle (also known as the Foyer–Halliwell–Asada pathway) by which chloroplasts remove damaging hydrogen peroxide. He subsequently focused on the role of free radicals in human diseases, demonstrating the toxicity of the hydroxyl radical, a metabolite of superoxide, and investigated the involvement of metal ions, including iron and zinc, in this process, as well as the protective effect of their sequestration. He has also worked on reactive nitrogen species. He developed methods to measure free radical levels in vivo and to quantify the damage they cause to DNA. He has also researched dietary antioxidants.

As of 2025, his research focuses on the role of free radicals and antioxidants in human disease, particularly Alzheimer's disease and other brain disorders. His interests include the characterisation of redox biomarkers for the identification of human diseases, molecular nutrition, the role of transition metal ions as promoters of radical reactions in vitro and in vivo, the development of drugs to prevent oxidative cell damage, the chemical nature of antioxidants in vivo, methods for the specific detection of reactive oxygen and reactive nitrogen species in vivo and their application to human disease, particularly stroke and neuro-degenerative diseases and ageing in humans and in the nematode Caenorhabditis elegans.

== Awards and honours ==
Halliwell was awarded the Public Administration Medal (Silver) in 2010 by the President of Singapore for contributions to Singapore and awarded the President's Science and Technology Medal (2013) by the President of Singapore "for distinguished sustained and exceptional contributions to Singapore's Science and Engineering landscape". Halliwell was conferred the Outstanding Service Award at the NUS University Awards on 8 September 2023.

In 2008, Halliwell was awarded the "Lifetime Achievement Award" by the Society for Free Radical Biology and Medicine in the US for overall sustained excellence in the field. He was described as a "Research Pioneer" by the journal Antioxidants & Redox Signaling in 2011. Same year, he was also awarded the Ken Bowman Research Award for outstanding achievements in the field of cardiovascular research from the Institute of Cardiovascular Sciences (Canada) and NUS University Award – Outstanding Researcher Award. He was elected a fellow of the American Association for the Advancement of Science in 2012.

Halliwell was awarded a Doctor of Science honoris causa by King's College London in 2018. He was again identified as a "Highly Cited Scientist" for cross-disciplinary work by Clarivate Analytics in 2018. He was honoured as a Citation Laureate (2021) for "pioneering research in free-radical chemistry including the role of free radicals and antioxidants in human disease". The distinction is awarded by information and insights company Clarivate to researchers whose work has been deemed to be of "Nobel Class" as they are among the most highly cited and influential, even transformative, in their fields. Citation Laureate candidates are selected from authors of the 0.01 per cent of some 52 million articles and proceedings that have been cited 2,000 times or more. He was one of 16 scientists (one of three in Chemistry) around the world listed in the Hall of Citation Laureates for 2021.

== Selected publications ==
Books

- Barry Halliwell, John MC Gutteridge. Free Radicals in Biology and Medicine (5th edn) (Oxford University Press, 2015) ISBN 0-19-871748-2
- Barry Halliwell. Chloroplast Metabolism (2nd edn) (Oxford University Press, 1984) ISBN 0-19-854585-1

Reviews

- Halliwell B; Gutteridge JM (1984). "Oxygen toxicity, oxygen radicals, transition metals and disease". Biochemical Journal. 219 (1): 1–14. doi:10.1042/bj2190001. PMC 1153442. PMID 6326753.
- Murphy MP, Bayir H, Belousov V, Chang CJ, Davies KJ, Davies MJ, Dick TP, Finkel T, Forman HJ, Gems D, Janssen-Heininger Y, Kagan VE, Kalyanaraman B, Larsson NG, Mile GL, Nyström T, Poulsen HE, Radi R, Remmen HV, Schumacker PT, Thornalley PJ, Toyokuni S, Winterbourn CC, Yin H, Halliwell B. (2022) Guidelines for measuring reactive oxygen species and oxidative damage in cells and in vivo. Nature Metabolism 4, 651–662.

Research articles

- Halliwell B, Watt F, Minqin R. (2023) Iron and atherosclerosis: Lessons learned from rabbits relevant to human disease. Free Radic. Biol. Med. 209, 165–170.
- Yau YF, Cheah IK, Mahendran R, Tang RMY, Chua RY, Goh RES, Feng L, Li J, Kua EH, Chen C, Halliwell B. (2024) Investigating the efficacy of ergothioneine to delay cognitive decline in mild cognitively impaired subjects: A pilot study. J. Alzheimer's Disease 102, 841–854.
