= C. H. Gimingham =

British botanist (1923–2018)

C. H. Gimingham FRSE, OBE
- Born: 28 April 1923; Harpenden, Hertfordshire, England
- Died: 19 June 2018 (aged 95); Milltimber, Aberdeen, Scotland
- Education: Cambridge University, Aberdeen University
- Spouse: Elizabeth Caroline Baird
- Children: Three daughters
- Parent(s): Conrad Theodore Gimingham and Muriel Elizabeth (née Blake)
- Scientific career
- Fields: Botany
- Institutions: Imperial College, London, Aberdeen University

Charles Henry Gimingham OBE FRSE FRSB (28 April 1923 – 19 June 2018) was a British botanist at the University of Aberdeen, patron of the Institute of Ecology and Environmental Management, former president of the British Ecological Society, and one of the leading researchers of heathlands and heathers.

== Early life and education ==
Gimingham was the son of Conrad Theodore Gimingham, of Harpenden, Hertfordshire, and Muriel Elizabeth (née Blake). He was named after his grandfather, another Charles Henry Gimingham, an eminent British entomologist who was President of the Association of Applied Biologists.

Gimingham was educated at Gresham's School, Holt, and Emmanuel College, Cambridge, where he was an open Scholar and graduated BA in 1944, then at Aberdeen University, graduating Doctor of Philosophy.

== Career ==
Gimingham began his career as a Research Assistant, first at Imperial College, London from 1944 to 1945, then at the University of Aberdeen from 1946 to 1948. He continued his academic career in Aberdeen, becoming a lecturer in 1948, a senior lecturer in 1961, a Reader in Botany in 1964, a professor in 1969, and a Regius Professor in 1981, a post he held until 1988.

He was also a member of several governing bodies and advisory boards related to his field, including the Countryside Commission for Scotland (1980–92), the Board of Management of the Hill Farming Research Organisation (1981–87), the Council of Management of the Macaulay Institute for Soil Research (1983–87), the Governing Body of the Macaulay Land Use Research Institute (1987–90), the advisory board of Robert Gordon University Heritage Unit, the Scientific Advisory Committee of Scottish Natural Heritage (1996–99), the Scientific Advisory Panel of RSK Environment Ltd, and the Mar Lodge Estate Management Committee of National Trust for Scotland. He was also the convenor of the English Nature Heathlands Committee from 1981 to 1995.

He was also a member of the Governing Body of Aberdeen College of Education (1979–87), and served as editor of the Outline Studies in Ecology series, and on the editorial board of the Botanical Journal of Scotland.

== Honours ==
- 1938-1940: President of the Association of Applied Biologists
- 1961: Fellow of the Royal Society of Edinburgh
- 1967: Fellow of the Institute of Biology
- 1974: Member of the Order of the British Empire
- 1977: ScD degree, Cambridge University
- 1982–1984: President of the Botanical Society of Edinburgh
- 1986: President of the British Ecological Society
- 1988: Emeritus Professor, University of Aberdeen
- 1990: Officer of the Order of the British Empire
- 2000: Patron of the Institute of Ecology and Environmental Management
- 2004: Honorary British Fellow, Botanical Society of Scotland
- 2004: President of the Heather Trust
- 2004: Honorary Member of the British Ecological Society

== Family ==
In 1948, Gimingham married Elizabeth Caroline, the only daughter of J. Wilson Baird, DD, Minister of St Machar's Cathedral, Aberdeen, and they have three daughters.

== Books ==
- Ecology of Heathlands (Chapman and Hall, London, 1972) ISBN 0-412-10460-1
- An Introduction to Heathland Ecology (Oliver & Boyd, 1975) ISBN 0-05-002876-6
- Methods for the Measurement of the Primary Production of Grassland (with C. Milner, R. E. Hughes, G. R. Miller and R. O. Slayter, Lippincott Williams & Wilkins, 1968) ISBN 0-397-60183-2
- The Lowland Heathland Management Handbook (English Nature, Peterborough, 1992)
- Ecology, Conservation and Land Use of the Cairngorms (Packard Publishing, 1999, ed.) ISBN 1-85341-117-5

== Publications ==
- A Note on Water-Table, Sand Movement and Plant Distribution in a North African Oasis
- Tussock Formation in Ammophila arenaria (with P. Greig-Smith and A. R. Gemmell, New Phytologist, Vol. 46, 1947)
- The Use of Life Form and Growth Form in the Analysis of Community Structure as Illustrated by a Comparison of Two Dune Communities (Journal of Ecology, 1951)
- Investigation of Correlations between Growth Form and Habitat in Mosses (with Miss E.M. Burnett, British Bryological Society, 1952)
- Development of a Soil Microflora in Relation to Plant Succession on Sand- Dunes, Including the Rhizosphere Flora Associated with Colonizing Species (with D. M. Webley and D. J. Eastwood, Journal of Ecology, 1952)
- A Note on the Behaviour of Ammophila arenaria (L) Link. in relation to sand-dune formation (with A. R Gemmell and P. Greig-Smith, Transactions of the Botanical Society of Edinburgh, 1953)
- Ecological Studies on Growth-Form in Bryophytes: I. Correlations Between Growth-Form and Habitat (with Evelyn M. Birse, Journal of Ecology, 1957)
- Biological Flora of the British Isles: Calluna vulgaris (Journal of Ecology, 1960)
- Calluna Salisb. (Journal of Ecology, 1960)
- North European Heath Communities: A Network of Variation (Journal of Ecology, 1961)
- The Effects of Fire on Regeneration of Calluna Vulgaris (with E. Whittaker, Journal of Ecology, 1962)
- Litter Production by Calluna Vulgaris (L.) Hull (with E. Cormack, Journal of Ecology, 1964)
- The Monoculture of Heather Calluna Vulgaris and its effects on Hill Grazings (1960)
- Vegetative Regeneration of Calluna Vulgaris after Fire (with A. J. Kayll, Journal of Ecology, Vol. 53, 1965)
- Interpretation of a Vegetational Mosaic on Limestone in the Island of Gotland (with N. M. Pritchard and R. M. Cormack, Journal of Ecology, 1966)
- Quantitative Community Analysis and Bryophyte Ecology on Signy Island (Philosophical Transactions of the Royal Society of London, 1967)
- The Description and Interpretation of Cyclical Processes in a Heath Community: I. Vegetational Change in Relation to the Calluna Cycle (with P. Barclay-Estrup, Journal of Ecology, 1969)
- The Morphology of Vegetative Regeneration in Calluna vulgaris (with B. F. Mohamed, New Phytologist, 1970)
- The Loch of Strathbeg (with W. R. P. Bourne, N. C. Morgan and R. H. Britton, Nature 242, 1973)
- Some Effects of Fire and Grazing on Heath Vegetation (with R.J. Hobbs, Bulletin of Ecology, 1980)
- Conservation: European Heathlands (in Ecosystems of the World, ed. R.L. Sprecht, Elsevier, Amsterdam, 1981)
- The Effects of Planting Technique on the Growth of Ammophila arenaria (with R. J. Hobbs and W. T. Band, Journal of Applied Ecology, 1983)
- Ecological Effects of Heather Burning: I. Water Infiltration, Moisture Retention and Porosity of Surface Soil (with A. U. Mallik and A. A. Rahman, Journal of Ecology, 1984)
- Germination and Establishment of Seedlings in Different Phases of the Calluna Life-Cycle in a Scottish Heathland (with E. Dehullu, Vegetatio, 1984)
- Studies on Fire in Scottish Heathland Communities: I. Fire Characteristics (with R. J. Hobbs, Journal of Ecology, 1984)
- Studies on Fire in Scottish Heathland Communities II. Post-Fire Vegetation Development (with R. J. Hobbs, Journal of Ecology, 1984)
- Studies on Fire in Scottish Heathland Communities: III. Vital Attributes of the Species (with R. J. Hobbs and A. U. Mallik, Journal of Ecology, 1984)
- The Use of Thermocolour Pyrometers in the Study of Heath Fire Behaviour (with R. J. Hobbs and J. E. P. Currall, Journal of Ecology, 1984)
- Ecological Effects of Heather Burning: II Effects on Seed Germination and Vegetative Regeneration (with A. U. Mallik, Journal of Ecology, 1985)
- Vegetation, Fire and Herbivore Interactions in Heathland (with R. J. Hobbs, Advances in Ecological Research, 1987)
- Harnessing the Winds of Change: Heathland Ecology in Retrospect and Prospect: Presidential Address to the British Ecological Society, December 1986 (Journal of Ecology, 1987)
- Experimental Investigation of Bryophyte Interactions on a Dry Heathland (with E. Scandrett, Journal of Ecology, 1989)
- A Model of Calluna Population-Dynamics - the Effects of Varying Seed and Vegetative Regeneration (with E. Scandrett, Vegetatio, 1989)
- Coastal Sand Dunes, proceedings of the Symposium organised by the Royal Society of Edinburgh (with W Ritchie, BB Willetts and AJ Willis, Royal Society of Edinburgh, 1989)
- Succession from Heather Moorland to Birch Woodland: I Experimental Alteration of Specific Environmental Conditions in the Field (with A. J. Hester and J. Miles, Journal of Ecology, 1991)
- Succession from Heather Moorland to Birch Woodland: II Growth and Competition Between Vaccinium Myrtillus, Deschampsia Flexuosa and Agrostis Capillaris (with A. J. Hester and J. Miles, Journal of Ecology, 1991)
- The Effect of Heather Beetle Lochmaea Suturalis on Vegetation in a Wet Heath in NE Scotland (with Eurig Scandrett, Ecography, 1991)
- Succession from Heather Moorland to Birch Woodland: III Seed Availability, Germination and Early Growth (with A. J. Hester and J. Miles, Journal of Ecology, 1991)
- Seed-Shedding in a Scottish Heath Community (with P. Barclay-Estrup, Journal of Vegetation Science, 1994)
- An Overview of Scottish Habitats (Botanical Journal of Scotland, 2002)
