= List of fellows of the Royal Society elected in 1997 =

This is a list of fellows of the Royal Society elected in 1997.

== Fellows ==
- Christopher Michael Bate
- Sir J. Michael Brady
- Michael George Bulmer
- John Boscawen Burland
- Richard Dickinson Chambers
- Colin Whitcomb Clark
- David Charles Clary
- Laurence Eaves
- Richard Alan Fortey
- Christopher David Garner
- Douglas Owen Gough
- Edward John Hinch
- James Julian Bennett Jack
- Paul Gordon Jarvis (1935-2013)
- Kuen Charles Kao
- Eric Barrington Keverne
- Philip Joseph Kocienski
- Peter Benedict Kronheimer
- Philippa Charlotte Marrack
- James Rankin Maxwell
- Timothy John Mitchison
- Richard Graham Michael Morris
- Christopher Miles Perrins
- George Richard Pickett
- George Henry Poste
- Kenneth Bannerman Milne Reid
- Alan Bernard Rickinson
- Leo Sachs
- Giacinto Scoles
- James Scott
- Wilson Sibbett
- Bernard Walter Silverman
- Sir Richard Sykes
- Richard Edward Taylor
- Neil Sidney Trudinger
- Robin Anthony Weiss
- Simon David Manton White
- Alan Hardwick Windle
- Richard Dean Wood
- Graham Charles Wood

== Foreign members ==
- Thomas Eisner (1929–2011)
- Walter Jakob Gehring
- Roy J Glauber
- Martin David Kruskal (1925–2006)
- George Andrew Olah
- Stanley Ben Prusiner
