= John Albert Raven =

British botanist (1941–2024)

John Raven
- Born: John Albert Raven; 25 June 1941
- Died: 23 May 2024 (aged 82); Dundee, Scotland
- Education: University of Cambridge (BA, MA, PhD)
- Awards: FRSE (1981); FRS (1990)
- Scientific career
- Fields: Botany; Ecophysiology
- Workplaces: University of Dundee; University of Technology Sydney
- Website: www.uts.edu.au/staff/john.raven; www.lifesci.dundee.ac.uk/people/john-raven

John Albert Raven FRS FRSE (25 June 1941 – 23 May 2024) was a British botanist who was emeritus professor at University of Dundee and the University of Technology Sydney. His primary research interests were in the ecophysiology and biochemistry of marine and terrestrial primary producers such as plants and algae.

== Early life and education ==
Raven was born on 25 June 1941, and brought up on a farm in northwest Essex and educated at the Friends' School, Saffron Walden and St John's College, Cambridge, receiving a Bachelor of Arts degree in Botany in 1963. He remained at Cambridge to complete a PhD in Botany (plant biophysics) in 1967, under the supervision of Enid MacRobbie, and specialising in the membrane transport processes and bioenergetics of giant-celled algae.

== Career ==
After a period as a lecturer at Cambridge, Raven moved to the University of Dundee in 1971, and he remained at Dundee until his formal retirement in 2008. He was appointed there to a personal chair in 1980, and was the John Boyd Baxter Professor of Biology from 1995 until 2008. In 1978, Raven was a co-founding editor of the influential peer reviewed scientific journal Plant, Cell & Environment with Paul Jarvis, David Jennings, Harry Smith and Bob Campbell.

== Research ==
Raven's research investigated algal life forms in the upper levels of the ocean, which underpin marine ecosystems and recycle carbon. He has explored how carbon dioxide, light and trace minerals interact to limit primary productivity in algae. Raven had research interests that range from organism-level bioenegetics, biochemistry and ecophysiology, through to wider-scale biogeochemistry, palaeoecology and even astrobiology. He published more than 500 refereed research papers, over 50 book chapters, the book Energetics and Transport in Aquatic Plants (1984), and, together with Paul Falkowski, the influential textbook Aquatic Photosynthesis (1997, 2007). In 2005, Raven led a Royal Society review of the state and implications of ongoing ocean acidification. As of 2016, Raven was active in both research and teaching, despite officially retiring in 2008 when he warned:

Life has survived many rapid and large amplitude environmental changes over billions of years, but we should not be complacent about the biological effects of current anthropogenic influences on the environment. At the most selfish level, we depend on the continued provision of 'ecosystem services' for our quality of life.

== Death ==
Raven died at Ninewells Hospital in Dundee on 23 May 2024, at the age of 82.

== Awards and honours ==
Raven was elected a Fellow of the Royal Society of Edinburgh (FRSE) in 1981.

He was elected President of the Botanical Society of Edinburgh for 1986–88.

Raven was elected a Fellow of the Royal Society (FRS) in 1990, for which his certificate of election reads:

Raven has made important theoretical and experimental contributions at the plant cell and whole plant levels. His work on H+ transport has helped to produce an integrated view of pH regulation in plants and on the transport of weak electrolytes such as plant growth substances and certain nutrients into plants. He has carried out important work on chemiosmotic mechanisms. His work on photosynthesis and respiration has provided quantitative clarification of the role of dark respiration in plants. He has also provided important information on the suppression of photorespiration by HCO₃ transport in aquatic plants and on the possible phylogeny of vascular land plants.

He was also a recipient of the Award of Excellence from Phycological Society of America in 2002 and made an Honorary Life Member of the British Phycological Society in 2006.

== Bibliography ==
- Raven, John A. (April 2004). "Building botany in Cambridge. 1904–2004: the centenary of the opening of the Botany School, University of Cambridge, UK". New Phytologist. 162 (1): 7–8. doi:10.1111/j.1469-8137.2004.01040.x.
