= Katayoon Dehesh =

Iranian-American plant biologist

- Born: 1952 (age 73–74); Tehran, Iran
- Education: Pahlavi University (B.S.); University of Sussex (PhD)
- Awards: President of the American Society of Plant Biologists (2021–2022); Fellow of the American Association for the Advancement of Science; Member of the German National Academy of Sciences Leopoldina
- Scientific career
- Fields: Plant biology
- Workplaces: University of California Riverside, Calgene, National University of Tehran, University of Kiel

Katayoon "Katie" Dehesh (born 1952) is an American plant biologist and academic. As of 2026, she is a distinguished professor at the University of California Riverside, where she also serves as head of their Institute for Integrative Genome Biology. She is a past president of the American Society of Plant Biologists, a Fellow of the American Association for the Advancement of Science, and a member of the German National Academy of Sciences Leopoldina.

== Biography ==
Dehesh was born in Tehran in 1952. She began her studies at the Pahlavi University, where she was also a political activist against the Iranian royal family. This caused her first-semester grades to struggle, but following her supervisor telling her to "drop out and learn how to cook and sew", she earned high grades.

During her second year of university, she discovered an interest in plant biology after witnessing halophytes around Maharloo Lake. She then decided to attend a PhD program in England, and despite not applying in advance was able to meet James Sutcliffe at the University of Sussex, then the head of plant biology. Her focus on halophytes aligned well with his focus on salt tolerance, and she become a PhD student in plant biology, focusing on Salicornia. She received several Iranian scholarships.

After finishing her PhD at Sutcliffe's lab, she returned to Tehran to visit family, intending to become a postdoctorate in the United States. During her period of applications, she worked as a professor at the Shahid Beheshti University, but was soon required to stay in the country and participate in mandatory military training. She was also ordered to not teach on religiously significant days and follow other religious rules, but decided to not follow them, which she has stated left her in fear for her life.

In September 1980, she slipped out of the country by jumping over the border to Turkey. During her trip from the border to Istanbul, some of her money was stolen from her by Turkish soldiers, though the remainder she had sewn into her clothes. She did not eat for three days for fear of revealing the money in her clothes.

She was invited to a fellowship in Germany, but when she refused to state she would return to Iran in a year, it was rescinded. She went on to work as a plant biologist in a lab at Freiburg, first as a volunteer before becoming a habilitate. When the lab moved to Kiel, however, she was not able to rent an apartment for weeks, which she alleges was due to her status as a single woman and an immigrant.

In 1986, she took a sabbatical to work with a professor at University of Wisconsin–Madison, but after her application for an unpaid extension of her sabbatical was declined, she left Germany for good to work with that professor at Madison and at University of California, Berkeley. She married that professor.

In 1994, she began working at the Calgene company, where she ran lipid biochemistry. Calgene was subsequently acquired by Monsanto, and she remained there until 2002, when she left to create her own lab at University of California, Davis. In 2016, she moved to University of California, Riverside, where she also became head of the school's genomics institute, the Institute for Integrative Genome Biology.

She served as the Ernst and Helen Leibacher Endowed Chair in Botany and Plant Sciences, and is a distinguished professor. Her work has focused on stress signals and the development of novel drugs from plants and apicomplexa. One study she did discovered 2-C-methyl-D-erythritol-2,4-cyclopyrophosphate was able to block the formation of biofilm.

She has also advocated for women in sciences. She collaborated with Reema bint Bandar Al Saud to support women in the sciences in Saudi Arabia.

She served as President of the American Society of Plant Biologists from 2021 to 2022. In 2018, she was elected as a member of the German National Academy of Sciences Leopoldina for her work in stress responses and retrograde signalling. In 2013, she was elected to the position of Fellow of the American Association for the Advancement of Science. She is also a honorary professor at Southwest University.
