= Charles Albert Shull =

American plant physiologist (1879–1962)

- Born: 1879
- Died: 1962 (aged 82–83)
- Known for: Founding president of the American Society of Plant Physiologists; founding editor-in-chief of Plant Physiology
- Scientific career
- Fields: Plant physiology, Botany
- Workplaces: University of Chicago

Charles Albert Shull (1879–1962) was an American botanist and plant physiologist who played a central role in establishing plant physiology as a professional discipline in the United States. He was professor of plant physiology in the Department of Botany at the University of Chicago from 1921 to 1944. Shull was the founding president of the American Society of Plant Physiologists in 1924 and the founding editor-in-chief of the society's journal, Plant Physiology, serving from 1925 to 1945. Under his editorial leadership the journal became a major international venue for research in plant physiology and helped shape the development of the field during the early twentieth century. He was one of several siblings who became prominent scientists; his brothers included the geneticist George Harrison Shull, the zoologist Aaron Franklin Shull, and the botanist and botanical illustrator J. Marion Shull.

== Early life and education ==
Charles Albert Shull was born on January 19, 1879, in Clark County, Ohio, the seventh of eight children of Harrison and Catherine Ryman Shull. He grew up on an Ohio farm and attended local country schools. Before entering college he worked as a schoolteacher.

Shull was one of several siblings who pursued careers in biology and related fields. His brother George Harrison Shull became a prominent geneticist and professor at Princeton University, known for his work on heterosis in maize. Another brother, Aaron Franklin Shull, was a zoologist and professor at the University of Michigan. An older brother, J. Marion Shull, was a botanist, botanical illustrator, and plant breeder associated with the United States Department of Agriculture. Together, the Shull siblings contributed to the development of several areas of biological science in the United States during the early twentieth century. He was also the brother of John William Scholl, a scholar of German literature, poet, and genealogist.

In 1900, at the age of twenty-one, Shull enrolled at Antioch College. While studying there he supported himself by working as an engineer and head janitor while carrying a full academic load. He later transferred to the University of Chicago, where he received a Bachelor of Science degree in 1905 and continued postgraduate study in zoology. Shull completed his doctorate at the University of Chicago in 1915.

== Academic career ==
Shull began his academic career in 1906 when he joined Transylvania University in Lexington, Kentucky, as assistant professor of biology. He was promoted in 1908 to professor of biology and geology. In 1912 he moved to the University of Kansas as assistant professor of botany, where he continued his research and teaching while completing his doctoral studies. Shull received his Ph.D. from the University of Chicago in 1915 and returned to Kansas as associate professor of plant physiology and genetics. In 1918 he served as chair of the department.

From 1918 to 1921 Shull was professor of plant physiology and head of the Department of Botany at the University of Kentucky. In 1921 he joined the University of Chicago as professor of plant physiology, filling the position vacated by William Crocker when Crocker became managing director of the Boyce Thompson Institute.

Shull remained at the University of Chicago for more than two decades, where he was known as an influential undergraduate and graduate teacher and supervised many doctoral students in plant physiology. He retired from the university in 1944 at the age of sixty-five.

== Scientific contributions ==
Shull conducted research in plant physiology with a particular emphasis on plant water relations and the physical processes governing leaf temperature and evaporation. His studies examined topics such as the thermodynamic basis of evaporation in plant tissues, the transfer of water within leaves, and the energy balance of leaves in relation to incident radiation.

Several of his investigations explored the physical and thermodynamic mechanisms underlying plant water movement, including evaporation, osmotic pressures, and imbibitional processes in plant tissues.

In addition to his experimental work, Shull wrote on broader aspects of scientific practice and publishing. In a 1931 article in Science, he criticized the widespread occurrence of inaccurate literature citations and argued that authors should verify references against original sources and avoid unnecessarily long or repetitive paper titles.

== Professional leadership and editorial work ==
Shull played a central role in organizing the emerging community of plant physiologists in the United States during the early twentieth century. In 1924 he was among the leaders involved in establishing the American Society of Plant Physiologists and served as its founding president.

The Society soon created a dedicated scientific journal to provide an outlet for research in the rapidly expanding field of plant physiology. Plant Physiology was first published in 1926 as the official journal of the Society. Shull served as the journal's founding editor-in-chief from 1925 to 1945.

Under Shull's editorial leadership the journal developed into a major venue for research on plant metabolism, growth, and physiological processes. The publication helped consolidate plant physiology as a distinct experimental discipline within botanical science during the early twentieth century.

== Honors and legacy ==
Shull received several honors from the American Society of Plant Physiologists in recognition of his contributions to the field and to the development of the society:

- 1929 – Charles Reid Barnes Life Membership Award
- 1934 – Stephen Hales Prize for distinguished service to plant physiology

Upon his retirement as editor-in-chief after two decades of service, the society dedicated Volume 20 of Plant Physiology (1945) to Shull in recognition of his leadership and editorial contributions.

In 1971 the American Society of Plant Biologists established the Charles Albert Shull Award to honor his role in founding the society and supporting its early growth. The award is presented annually to an early-career scientist for outstanding investigations in plant biology.
