= Christine Foyer =

Professor of Plant Science

Christine Helen Foyer FLS FRSB
- Born: 3 October 1952; Gainsborough, Lincolnshire, England
- Education: King's College London; University of Portsmouth
- Known for: redox, glutathione, ascorbate, photosynthesis
- Awards: Redox Pioneer
- Scientific career
- Fields: Biochemistry
- Workplaces: University of Leeds
- Academic advisors: Barry Halliwell

Christine Helen Foyer (born 3 October 1952) is professor of plant science at the University of Birmingham, Birmingham, UK. She is President Elect of the Association of Applied Biologists, the General Secretary of the Federation of European Societies of Plant Biologists, an elected Board Member of the American Society of Plant Biologists and a Member of the French Academy of Agriculture. She has published and co-authored many papers on related subjects.

Foyer's name is included in the "Foyer–Halliwell–Asada" pathway, a cellular process of hydrogen peroxide metabolism in plants and animals and named for the three principal discoverers.

== Education ==
Foyer attended Portsmouth Polytechnic (now the University of Portsmouth) from 1971–74, achieving a BSc with Class II, Division I Honours in Biology (CNAA).

From 1974–77 she attended the Department of Biochemistry, King's College London, where she completed her PhD. During this time Foyer also attended a course on immunology at Chelsea College, London.

In 1998 Foyer was elected a Fellow of the Institute of Biology.

== Work ==
Foyer researches plant growth regulation and development under optimal circumstances and in conditions of stress (caused by, for example, lack of water, low temperatures, high light, infestation by aphids). Her work has a special focus on how cellular reduction/oxidation (redox), homeostasis and signalling interact with phytohormone–mediated pathways, particularly involving abscisic acid, auxin and strigolactones. Her research is centered on ascorbate and glutathione as key regulators of plant responses to stress and on how redox processes associated with primary metabolism particularly photosynthesis and respiration regulate gene expression.

The department addresses research problems of intrinsic scientific interest but is always mindful of the needs of agriculture and food security. In addition to undertaking fundamental studies on model plant species such as Arabidopsis thaliana, research in the Foyer lab includes work which relates the research findings, particularly in relation to enhancing stress tolerance, to crop species such as soybean, maize and barley.

== Selected publications ==
Books

- Identification and Application of Phenotypic and Molecular Markers for Abiotic Stress Tolerance in Soybean, Berhanu Amsalu Fenta, Belen Marquez Garcia, Christine H. Foyer, Karl J. Kunert, Magdeleen DuPlessis, Urte Schluter: 2011. INTECH Open Access Publisher: ISBN 978-953-307-721-5
- A New Era in Plant Metabolism Research Reveals a Bright Future for Bio-fortification and Human Nutrition, Christine H Foyer, Dean Dellapenna, Dominique Van der Straeten: 2006
- Plant Carbon-nitrogen Interactions from Rhizosphere to Plant, Caroline Bowsher, Christine H Foyer, Society for Experimental Biology: Oxford University Press: 2004.
- Molecular Physiology: Engineering Crops for Hostile Environments, Martin A Parry, Christine H Foyer, Brian Forde: Oxford University Press: 2000. ISBN
- Causes of Photooxidative Stress and Amelioration of Defense Systems in Plants, Christine H Foyer, Philip M Mullineaux: CRC Press: 1994. ISBN 978-0-8493-5443-4
- Photosynthesis, Christine H Foyer, Kreiger Publishing Co.: 1991 ISBN 978-0-89464-506-8

Research articles

- Foyer, Christine H.; Halliwell, Barry (1976). "The presence of glutathione and glutathione reductase in chloroplasts: a proposed role in ascorbic acid metabolism". Planta. 133 (1): 21–25. doi:10.1007/BF00386001. PMID 24425174. S2CID 27896738.
