= Ernest M. Shull =

Ernest Melvin Shull (8 September 1915 – 18 March 2002) was an American missionary with the Church of the Brethren and an amateur lepidopterist and naturalist who worked and lived for many years as a missionary in the Dangs, India. He wrote a book on the butterflies of Indiana and donated his collections to museums in the United States.

Shull was born in Girard, Illinois to William Harrison (1868–1949) and Clara Elizabeth Gibson Shull (1873–1967) and was educated at Manchester College, Indiana and Hartford Seminary, Connecticut, Cornell University and at Ball State University. He then taught at St Francis College, Fort Wayne. In his spare time he took an interest in butterflies, studying those in Indiana from 1931 to 1946 and again after returning from India in 1964. Along with his wife Lois Irene née Netzley (1917-2010, married 1937), he lived in Ahwa and worked in the Dangs Rural Boarding School in the Surat Dangs, Gujarat from 1946 to 1964. He collected natural history specimens widely in India and, for a while, held a record for capturing 100 species of butterfly in a single day. He wrote a book on The Butterflies of Indiana (1987) and donated many of his specimens to the American Museum of Natural History and the Florida Museum of Natural History. He also documented the butterflies and natural history of the Dangs region, recorded the behavior and breeding of the four-horned antelope. collected bird specimens, and documented tribal beliefs on tiger deities in the region. He contributed as many as 11,000 specimens to the American Museum of Natural History. A spider species Misumenoides shulli, collected by Shull in Mussoorie is named after him.
