= Harrison Shull =

American theoretical chemist (1923–2003)

- Born: August 17, 1923
- Died: July 28, 2003 (aged 79)
- Education: Princeton University; University of California, Berkeley
- Known for: Natural orbital theory
- Scientific career
- Fields: Theoretical chemistry
- Workplaces: Indiana University Bloomington; Rensselaer Polytechnic Institute; University of Colorado Boulder; Naval Postgraduate School

Harrison Shull (August 17, 1923 – July 28, 2003) was an American theoretical chemist and academic administrator known for foundational contributions to quantum chemistry, particularly the development of natural orbital theory in electronic structure calculations. He was elected to the National Academy of Sciences in 1969. Shull later served as provost or chief academic officer at several institutions, including Indiana University Bloomington, Rensselaer Polytechnic Institute, the University of Colorado Boulder, and the Naval Postgraduate School.

== Early life and education ==
Shull was born in Princeton, New Jersey, the youngest son of geneticist George Harrison Shull, a professor at Princeton University known for his work on hybrid corn. He graduated first in his class from Princeton High School and received his A.B. in chemistry with highest honors from Princeton University in 1943.

During World War II, he worked in the chemistry division of the Naval Research Laboratory in Washington, D.C., later receiving the rank of ensign. After the war, Shull earned his Ph.D. in physical chemistry from the University of California, Berkeley in 1948, where he studied molecular excited states and electronic structure theory. He subsequently held a National Research Council fellowship at the University of Chicago, working with physicist Robert S. Mulliken on molecular orbital theory.

== Career ==
After completing his postdoctoral work with Robert S. Mulliken at the University of Chicago, Shull joined Iowa State University as an assistant professor with a joint appointment in the Ames Laboratory. His early research focused on electronic structure theory and transition probabilities in small molecules, at a time when digital computing was beginning to transform chemical research.

In collaboration with Per-Olov Löwdin at Uppsala University, Shull helped develop the concept of natural orbitals in the mid-1950s. Their work provided new methods for describing electron correlation in atoms and molecules and influenced the emerging field of ab initio quantum chemistry. He applied these approaches to helium, hydrogen, and related systems, contributing to improved theoretical treatments of molecular bonding and excited states.

In 1955 Shull joined Indiana University Bloomington, where he remained for 24 years. He became an advocate for the use of large-scale computing in chemistry and founded the Quantum Chemistry Program Exchange (QCPE), which distributed computational chemistry software to researchers internationally. At Indiana he later served as dean of the graduate school and as vice-chancellor for research and development.

In 1979 Shull was appointed provost of Rensselaer Polytechnic Institute. He served as chancellor of the University of Colorado Boulder from 1982 to 1986, where he promoted campus-wide adoption of computing technologies. From 1988 to 1995, he was provost and vice president for academic affairs at the Naval Postgraduate School in Monterey, California.

== Honors and recognition ==
- National Academy of Sciences (elected 1969)
- American Academy of Arts and Sciences (elected 1973)
- American Association for the Advancement of Science (elected 1978)
- Guggenheim Fellowship (1954)
