= Anna Amtmann =

Professor for Molecular Plant Physiology at the University of Glasgow

- Education: Heidelberg University (BS); University of Göttingen (MSc, PhD)
- Scientific career
- Institutions: University of York; University of Glasgow
- Thesis: Ca2-360 und NA+ im Cytoplasma der Meeresalge Acetabularia : Aktivitätsbestimmungen mit ionenselektiven Mikroelektroden und kinetische (1993)

Anna Amtmann is a German scientist. She is professor for Molecular Plant Physiology at the University of Glasgow. She served as Editor-in-Chief of the journal Plant, Cell & Environment from 2018 to 2023.

== Early life and education ==
Amtmann studied languages, mathematics and biology at the University of Paris and Heidelberg University. She was an Erasmus Programme student at the University of Barcelona. Amtmann completed her graduate degrees in biology in the laboratory of Dietrich Gradmann at the University of Göttingen. Her doctoral research involved the use of electrophysiology to study unicellular marine algae, in an effort to understand how they maintain homeostasis for calcium and sodium ions.

== Research and career ==
In 1993, after earning her PhD, Amtmann investigated ion transport properties in barley in Dale Sanders' laboratory at the University of York. Whilst at York she developed microarrays that could be used to monitor how ion transporters responded to nutrient deficiency and salinity.

Amtmann was appointed a lecturer at the University of Glasgow in 2001 and was promoted to Professor in 2014. She spent 2007 on sabbatical at the Max Planck Institute of Molecular Plant Physiology in Golm. Her research considers the mechanisms by which plants adapt to nutrient deficiency, drought and salinity. She has explored how solar-powered microorganisms could be used to extra salt from seawater. Amtmann's research has been supported by the Biotechnology and Biological Sciences Research Council. She is a co-director of Algae UK, one of six Networks in Industrial Biotechnology and Bioenergy (NIBBs) that look to support the UK's transition to a low carbon economy. Algae UK looks to increase research and development into high value products created from microalgae and macroalgae, as well as increasing attention to cyanobacterial synthetic biology.

== Selected publications ==
- Amtmann, Anna (August 1999). "K^{+} Nutrition and Na^{+} Toxicity: The Basis of Cellular K^{+} /Na^{+} Ratios". Annals of Botany. 84 (2): 123–133. doi:10.1006/anbo.1999.0912.
- Amtmann, Anna (1998). "Mechanisms of Na^{+} Uptake by Plant Cells". Advances in Botanical Research. 29: 75–112. doi:10.1016/S0065-2296(08)60310-9. ISBN 9780120059294.
- Amtmann, Anna (2008). "The effect of potassium nutrition on pest and disease resistance in plants". Physiologia Plantarum. 133 (4): 682–691. doi:10.1111/j.1399-3054.2008.01075.x. PMID 18331404.

Amtmann is the editor-in-chief of Plant, Cell & Environment.

== Personal life ==
Amtmann is married to Pawel Herzyk, who she met during her first postdoctoral position at the University of York. Together they have twin boys.
