= George Harrison Shull =

American geneticist

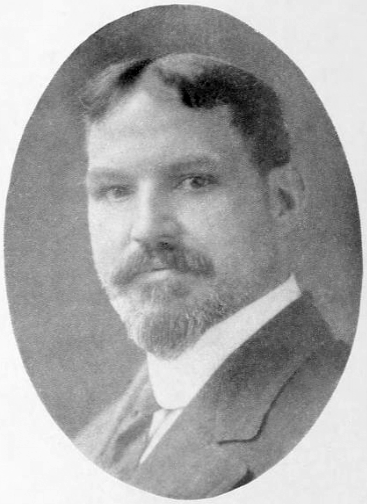
- Born: April 15, 1874; Clark County, Ohio, US.
- Died: September 28, 1954 (aged 80); Princeton, New Jersey, US.
- Resting place: Santa Rosa Odds Fellows Cemetery, Santa Rosa, Sonoma County, California, US.
- Education: University of Chicago
- Awards: Public Welfare Medal (1948)
- Scientific career
- Fields: Genetics
- Author abbrev. (botany): Shull

George Harrison Shull (April 15, 1874 – September 28, 1954) was an American plant geneticist who played a central role in the development of hybrid maize and in establishing the genetic basis of heterosis.

He was one of several siblings who pursued careers in biology; his brothers included the plant physiologist Charles Albert Shull, professor at the University of Chicago and founding editor-in-chief of Plant Physiology; the zoologist Aaron Franklin Shull of the University of Michigan; and the botanist and botanical illustrator J. Marion Shull. Another brother was John William Scholl, a scholar of German literature, poet, and genealogist. His niece, the geneticist Elizabeth Shull Russell of the Jackson Laboratory, was elected to the National Academy of Sciences and served as president of the Genetics Society of America. His son Harrison Shull (1923–2003) was also a distinguished scientist specializing in the quantum mechanics of small-molecule electronic spectra.

== Early life and education ==
George Harrison Shull was born on a farm in Clark County, Ohio. He graduated from Antioch College in 1901 and earned a Ph.D. from the University of Chicago in 1904. He served as a botanical expert for the Bureau of Plant Industry in 1903–1904.

== Career and research ==
Shull subsequently became a botanical investigator at the Carnegie Institution at the Station for Experimental Evolution in Cold Spring Harbor, New York. There he conducted influential research on plant genetics and breeding.

Working primarily with maize, Shull developed true-breeding inbred lines and experimentally crossed them. He observed that hybrids derived from these weak inbred strains were often vigorous and uniform, a phenomenon he described in 1908. Shull later introduced the term heterosis in 1914 to describe the increased vigor of hybrid offspring. His work demonstrated that high-yielding maize could be produced by crossing carefully maintained inbred lines, providing the scientific foundation for modern hybrid maize breeding.

The application of these principles led to the development of hybrid maize breeding programs in the early twentieth century. Early hybrid seed production often relied on double-cross hybrids derived from multiple inbred lines, which were easier to produce at scale. Subsequent advances in breeding and seed production enabled the use of single-cross hybrids, which provided greater uniformity and higher yields and became the dominant form of hybrid maize used in commercial agriculture. The practical success of hybrid maize demonstrated how fundamental genetic research could lead to transformative agricultural innovations.

Parallel work by the American geneticist Edward Murray East at the Connecticut Agricultural Experiment Station helped confirm the genetic basis of hybrid vigor and contributed to the development of hybrid corn breeding systems that were later widely adopted in agriculture.

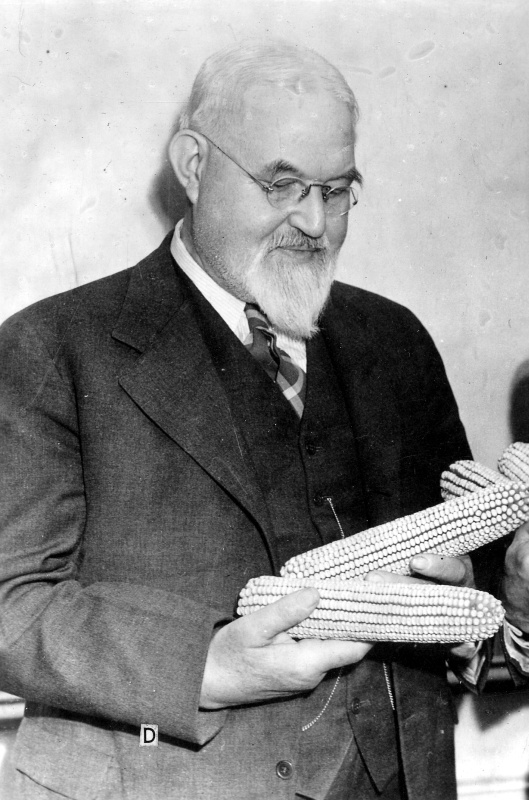
Shull with hybrid corn, 1949. The photograph was inscribed to President Harry S. Truman as “Originator of Hybrid Corn.”

For his contributions to agricultural science, Shull received the Public Welfare Medal from the National Academy of Sciences in 1948. He was also elected to the American Philosophical Society.

Shull was also the founding editor of the scientific journal Genetics.

== Personal life ==
Shull married Ella Amanda Hollar in July 1906. A daughter, Elizabeth Ellen, born May 8, 1907, did not survive her birth. Ella died two weeks later. All are buried in Santa Rosa, California, in the Santa Rosa Odd Fellows Cemetery. Shull married Mary Julia Nicholl on August 26, 1909. He and his second wife had six children (John Shull, Georgia Shull Vandersloot, Frederick Shull, David Shull, Barbara Shull Miller, and Harrison Shull).

== Death ==
Shull died in Princeton on September 28, 1954. His cremains were buried in Santa Rosa, California where his first wife was buried. His second wife's remains were also buried there twelve years later.

== Selected publications ==
- Shull, George H. (1907). "The Significance of Latent Characters". Science. 25 (646): 792–794. doi:10.1126/science.25.646.792. PMID 17810906.
- Shull, George H. (1907). "Some Latent Characters of a White Bean". Science. 25 (647): 828–832. doi:10.1126/science.25.647.828-b. PMID 17828973.
- Shull, George H. (1946). "Hybrid Seed Corn". Science. 103 (2679): 547–550. doi:10.1126/science.103.2679.547. PMID 17800109.
