= Society for Experimental Biology =

Learned scientific society

The Society for Experimental Biology is a learned society for animal, cell and plant biologists. It was founded in 1923 at Birkbeck College to "promote the art and science of experimental biology in all its branches". It aims to demonstrate the importance and impact of experimental biology research to the wider public and within the scientific community and to connect and support experimental biologists in their research and career development. The society has an international membership of approximately 1500, more than 20 scientific special interest groups and an outreach, education, and diversity (OED) group.

== Activities ==
The main activities of the society are the organisation and sponsorship of scientific meetings, the publication of relevant research, and the promotion of development of experimental biologists through education, communication, and career development programmes.

The society organises one large meeting each year, plus a number of smaller meetings. The main meeting is held in the United Kingdom or continental Europe and has up to 1000 attendees, with three plenary lectures (the Bidder, Woolhouse, and Cell Plenary Lectures) and nine parallel sessions.

Its publications include five peer-reviewed scientific journals: the Journal of Experimental Botany published by Oxford University Press, The Plant Journal (ISSN 1365-313X), published with Wiley-Blackwell, Plant Biotechnology Journal (ISSN 1467-7652, co-owned with the Association of Applied Biologists and published by Wiley-Blackwell), Plant Direct (ISSN 2475-4455), an open access journal published in collaboration with the American Society of Plant Biologists and Wiley, and an open access journal established in 2013, Conservation Physiology (ISSN 2051-1434), published on behalf of the society by Oxford University Press.

The society is administered from its head office at Charles Darwin House in London, shared with the Royal Society of Biology, with an additional office in Lancaster which hosts the management team of the Journal of Experimental Botany and the society's Head of Education. It is funded through income from publications, investments, and member subscriptions. The freely available SEB Magazine has generally appeared in Spring and Autumn, since 2012.
