= J. Marion Shull =

American botanical illustrator

James Marion Shull (1872–1948) was an American botanist known for his iris and daylily cultivars and botanical illustrations. Shull came from a family that produced several prominent biologists. His brothers included the plant physiologist Charles Albert Shull, professor at the University of Chicago and founding editor-in-chief of Plant Physiology; the geneticist George Harrison Shull of Princeton University, known for pioneering work on heterosis in maize; and the zoologist Aaron Franklin Shull, a professor at the University of Michigan who worked on genetics and evolution.

== Career ==
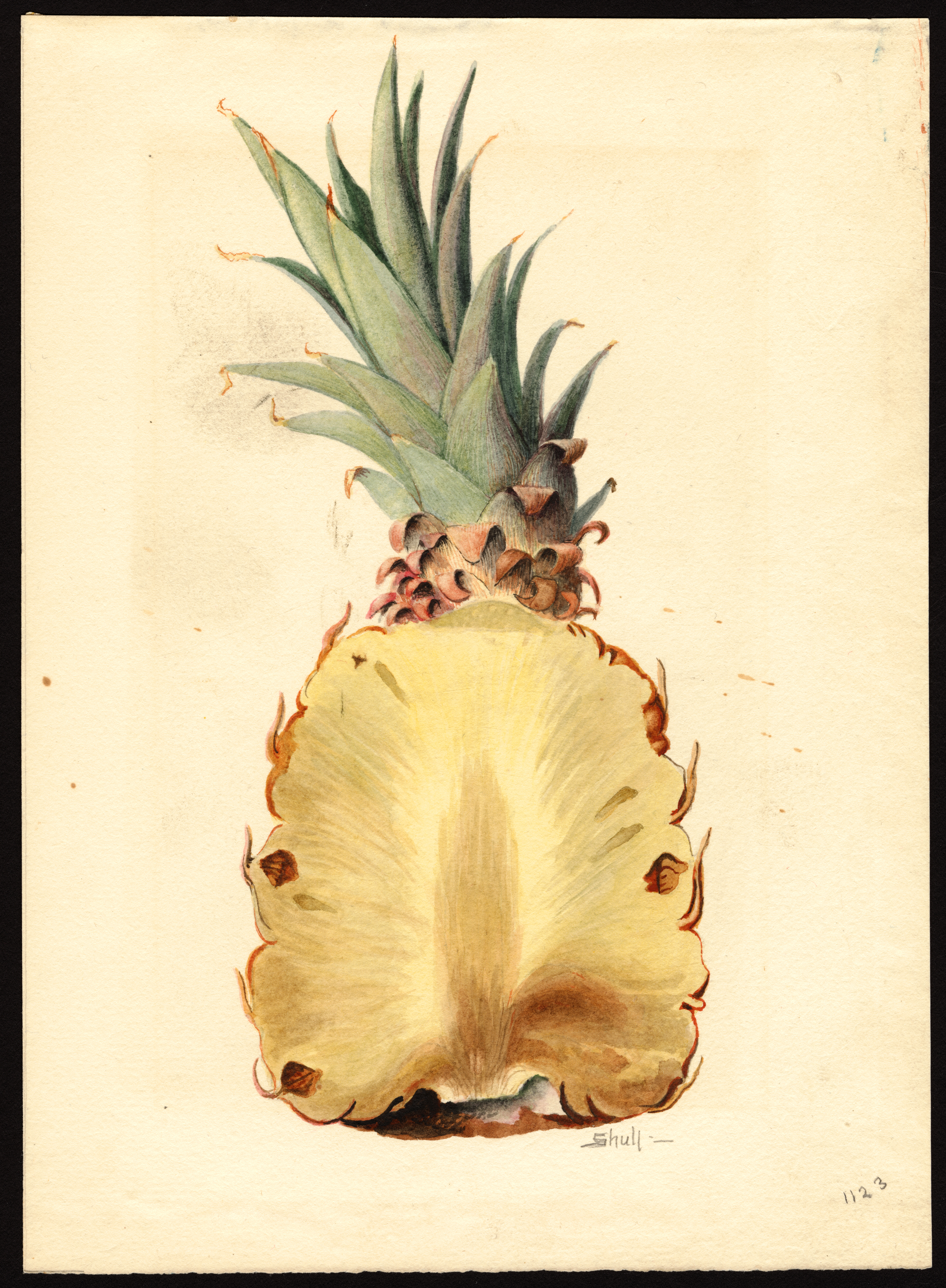
Watercolor of pineapple (Ananas comosus) by J. Marion Shull, 1919.

J. Marion Shull began his career with the government as a dendrological illustrator for the U.S. Forest Service (1907–1909). He moved on to work for more than three decades as a botanist and botanical illustrator for the Bureau of Plant Industry at the U. S. Department of Agriculture, first as a botanical artist (1909–1925) and then as an associate botanist (1925–1942). He painted over 750 watercolors of nuts, fruits, and other botanical specimens, including walnuts, pineapples, figs, and especially citrus and apples for the USDA. He was a fruit disease investigator for the department, and many of his illustrations show specimens affected by disease. At the USDA, he formed part of a select group of illustrators—including Deborah Griscom Passmore, Amanda Newton, Royal Charles Steadman, Ellen Isham Schutt, and Elsie Lower—whose paintings form the core of the USDA's Pomological Watercolor Collection.

Shull also painted a number of early iris hybrids developed by the breeder Bruce Williamson, an experience that prompted him to become a plant breeder himself like his younger brother George Harrison Shull. He subsequently achieved recognition as an iris and daylily (genus Hemerocallis) breeder, producing some two dozen different iris cultivars between 1920 and 1937. His tall yellow iris cultivar named Virginia Moore received a first Honorable Mention from the American Iris Society on its introduction in 1920, and a collection of irises including Morning Splendor, Maori Princess, and Nimbus received an Award of Merit from the Takoma Horticultural Club in 1922, with Morning Splendor being singled out for special recognition. A deep red-purple cultivar that was one of the first modern irises bred out of Iris trojana, Morning Splendor went on to win both the Gold and Silver Medals of the Garden Club of America in 1926 and to become the ancestor of other successful varieties. Shull also served an accredited judge for the AIS and won the society's Distinguished Service Medal.

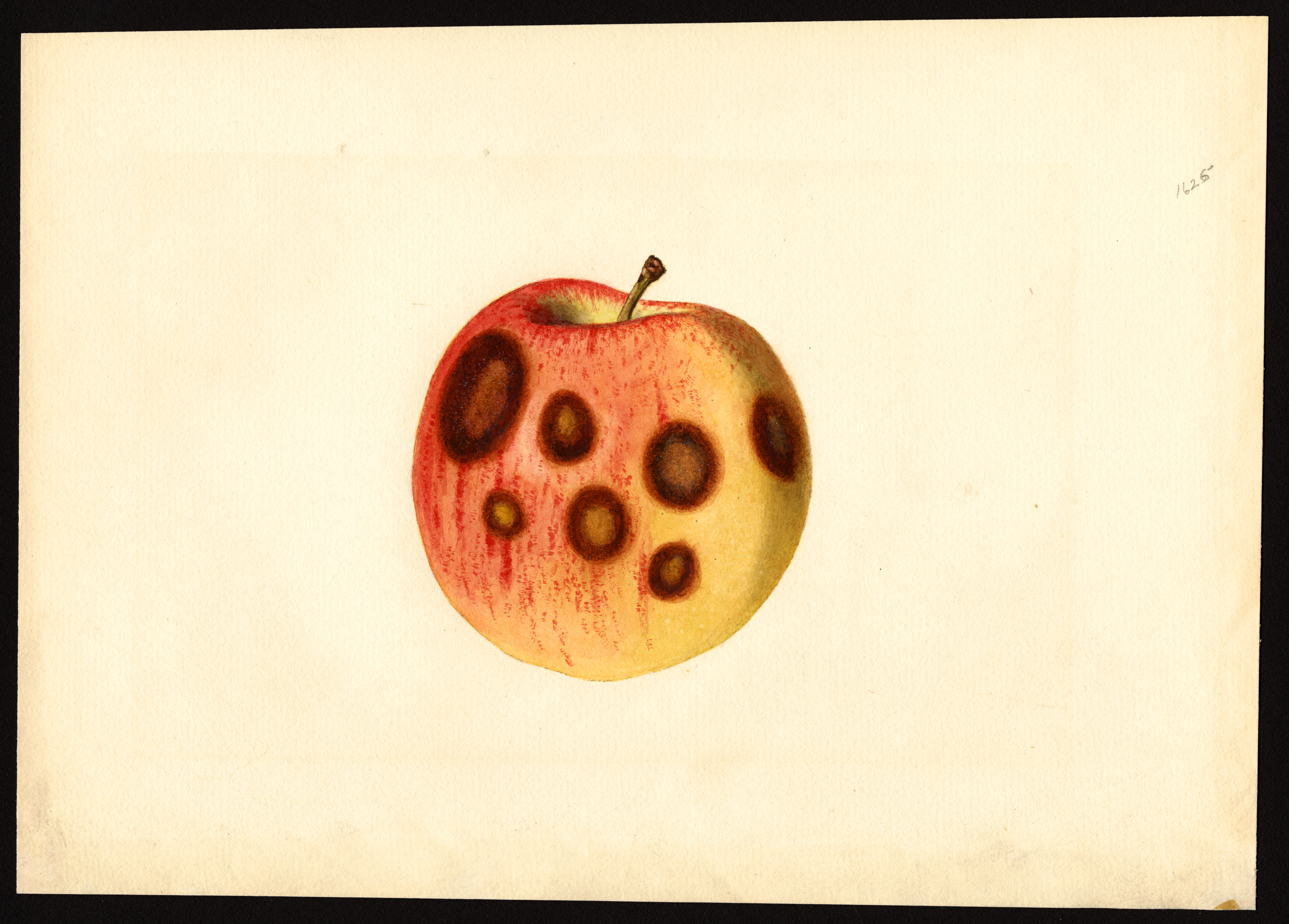
Watercolor of Rome apple by J. Marion Shull.

Shull's 1931 book Rainbow Fragments: A Garden Book of the Iris covers the history of iris breeding, cultivation tips, and hybridization techniques in Shull's characteristically "flowery and poetic" prose. It is one of the earliest books to include color plates of irises (along with black-and-white photos showing different aspects of iris cultivation), and Shull himself painted the eight color plates, which are placed before the title page. These plates show a total of 18 different iris cultivars by various breeders (including Shull's Maori Princess, Julia Marlowe, Elaine, Sequoia, and Morning Splendor), most placed against a plain black or pale background. Although out of print, it continues to be of value to breeders for its precise descriptions of irises grown in the first third of the 20th century, and it is also sought after for Shull's elegant color illustrations. Shull also produced some illustrations for publications such as Country Life and Ladies' Home Journal.

Following World War I, Shull agitated for a peace carillon, or set of bells, to be created from melted-down cannons to commemorate the end of the war. In an article entitled "The Peace Carillon" he wrote:

It is here proposed that in the city of Washington there shall be erected a national memorial to commemorate the heroes and events of the great war, seeking to keep the chief emphasis on the esthetic and moral side rather than on that of the physical triumph of armed force.

He died at home in Chevy Chase, Maryland, on Sept. 1, 1948.
