= Journal of Experimental Botany =

- Discipline: Plant biology
- Language: English
- Edited by: John Lunn

Publication details
- History: 1950–present
- Publisher: Oxford University Press (United Kingdom)
- Frequency: 22/year
- Open access: Hybrid
- License: Creative Commons Attribution Licence
- Impact factor: 7.298 (2021)

Standard abbreviations
- ISO 4: J. Exp. Bot.

Indexing
- CODEN: JEBOA6
- ISSN: 0022-0957 (print); 1460-2431 (web)
- LCCN: 65071009
- OCLC no.: 474778127

Links
- Journal homepage; Online access

The Journal of Experimental Botany (JXB) is a peer-reviewed scientific journal published by Oxford University Press on behalf of the Society for Experimental Biology. It covers research on plant biology, focusing on molecular physiology, molecular genetics, and environmental physiology. Some of its content is available under an open access licence. The editor-in-chief is John Lunn (Max Planck Institute of Molecular Plant Physiology).

Research is published in five key areas: growth and development, cell biology, metabolism, plant-environment interactions, and crop molecular genetics.
