= Plant Biotechnology Journal =

- Discipline: Biotechnology, botany, Plant Sciences
- Language: English
- Edited by: Johnathan Napier

Publication details
- History: 2003–present
- Publisher: Wiley-Blackwell (United States)
- Frequency: Monthly
- Open access: Open access
- Impact factor: 13.263 (2021)

Standard abbreviations
- ISO 4: Plant Biotechnol. J.

Indexing
- ISSN: 1467-7644 (print); 1467-7652 (web)
- LCCN: 2003252092
- OCLC no.: 1004527419

Links
- Journal homepage; Online access; Online archive

Plant Biotechnology Journal, an Open Access journal, publishes high-impact original research and incisive reviews with an emphasis on molecular plant sciences and their applications through plant biotechnology. It was established in 2003 and is published by Wiley-Blackwell in association with the Society for Experimental Biology and the Association of Applied Biologists. The editor-in-chief is Johnathan Napier (Rothamsted Research). According to the Journal Citation Reports, the journal has a 2021 impact factor of 13.263, ranking it 5th out of 238 journals in the category "Plant Sciences" and 8th out of 158 journals in the category "Biotechnology & Applied Microbiology". As an Open Access journal, articles are accessible globally without restriction. To cover the cost of publishing, Plant Biotechnology Journal charges a publication fee.
