= Elizabeth S. Russell =

American geneticist

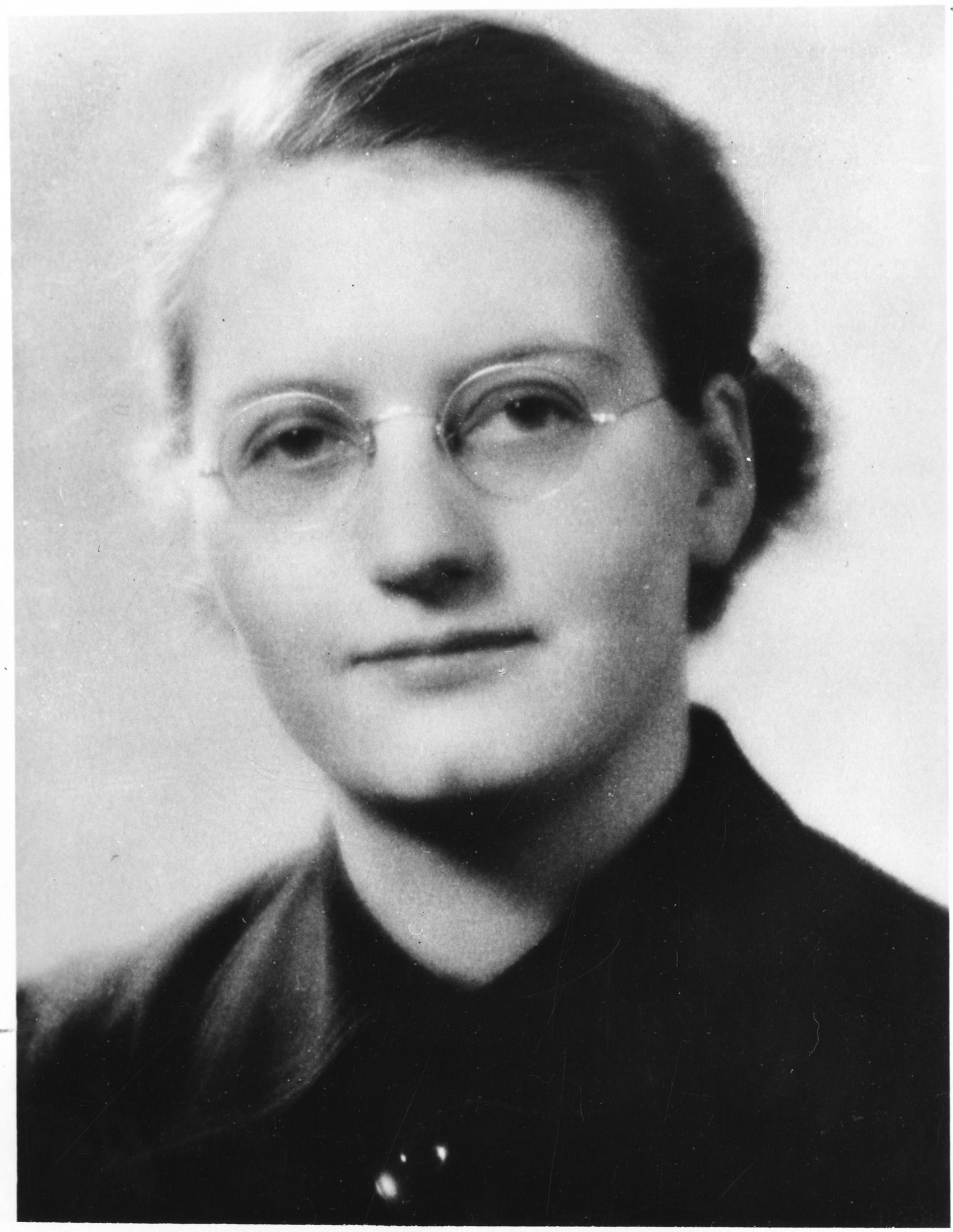
- Russell in 1939
- Born: Elizabeth Buckley Shull; May 1, 1913; Ann Arbor, Michigan
- Died: May 28, 2001 (aged 88)
- Other name: "Tibby" Russell
- Education: University of Michigan; Columbia University; University of Chicago (PhD 1937)
- Known for: Work on pigmentation, blood-forming cells and germ cells.
- Spouse: William L. Russell
- Children: Four
- Parent(s): Aaron Franklin Shull and Margaret Buckley
- Relatives: George H. Shull (uncle)
- Awards: Maine Women's Hall of Fame
- Scientific career
- Fields: Zoology, developmental biology
- Institutions: Jackson Laboratory

Elizabeth Shull Russell (May 1, 1913 – May 28, 2001), also known as "Tibby" Russell, was an American biologist in the field of mammalian developmental genetics, spending most of her career at the Jackson Laboratory in Bar Harbor, Maine. Russell is most recognized for her ground breaking work in pigmentation, blood-forming cells, and germ cells. She also raised awareness of the benefits of genetically defined laboratory animals in biomedical research.

== Personal life ==
Russell was born Elizabeth Buckley Shull in Ann Arbor, Michigan. She was the eldest child of Margaret Jeffrey Buckley and Aaron Franklin Shull, both of whom were zoologists, and the niece of George H. Shull, a prominent geneticist. Elizabeth was fascinated by science and the scientific approach from an early age, leading her to study zoology at the University of Michigan, from which she graduated in 1933. After receiving a scholarship from Columbia University and completing her master's degree in 1934, she went to work at the University of Chicago, obtaining her Ph.D. in zoology in 1937, and marrying fellow student William L. Russell the same year.

The couple moved to work at Jackson Memorial Laboratory, however, her position was unpaid. Russell began studying tumorogenesis in fruitflies (Drosophila melanogaster). She had two publications and four children between the years 1940 and 1946 (three boys, Richard, John, and James and a girl, Ellen). The nickname Tibby came from her husband during this time, because they worked in a laboratory with several other women named Elizabeth.

In 1947 Russell's marriage ended in divorce, but she maintained a good relationship with her ex-husband. Later that year the Jackson Memorial Laboratory burnt down, killing the majority of the research animals. Elizabeth was in charge of obtaining new mice from laboratories around the world.

== Research contributions ==
Russell studied hereditary anemias and blood-forming cells, focusing on laboratory mice. The results of her research helped to understand the genetic mechanism of blood disorders, which in turn led to the better understanding of such diseases as sickle cell anemia and thalassemia. In work published in Science, Russell's work described the genetic basis (a defect in an enzyme) of a fetal anemia, a key biosynthetic step in heme biosynthesis.

Russell went on to genetically characterize many laboratory animals for phenotypes such as physical attributes and disease susceptibilities, completing a major histological study on the effect that the major coat color mutations of the mouse have on the physical attributes and distribution of pigment granules in the hair. This analysis is the first attempt to define each phenotype of the mouse in terms of genetic factors, setting the stage for virtually all coat-color studies.

== Recognition and awards ==
Russell was a member of the advisory council of the National Institute on Aging for five years. She was elected a Fellow of the American Academy of Arts and Sciences in 1956, and a member of the National Academy of Sciences in 1972; Russell also served as president of the Genetics Society of America. In 1978 she was appointed by the secretary of health, education, and welfare to co-chair a committee assessing the future need for biomedical researchers. She was the recipient of a Guggenheim Fellowship in 1958; and in 1983 was named one of Ten Outstanding Women of Northern and Eastern Maine. That same year, she was elected to the American Philosophical Society. She received, among other things, the Woman of Achievement Award from Westbrook College in 1985; and the University of Maine's Maryann Hartman Award in 1990; as well as honorary degrees from several Maine colleges. In 1991 she was elected to the Maine Women's Hall of Fame. She also served as a trustee at the University of Maine (1975–1983), College of the Atlantic (1977) and Associated Universities, Inc. (1977–1983).
