= Aaron Franklin Shull =

Aaron Franklin Shull (1 August 1881 – 7 November 1961) was an American zoologist and professor at the University of Michigan. He contributed to studies on genetics and evolution. He was noted as an influential teacher who took a keen interest in the teaching of biology and wrote several textbooks.

Shull was born in Miami County, Ohio to Harrison and Catherine Ryman Shull. Two of his siblings included Charles Albert Shull (1879–1962) who became a professor of plant physiology and George Harrison Shull (1874–1954) who became professor of botany and genetics. Another brother was the botanical illustrator James Marion Shull (1872–1948). He grew up on the family farm, learning first hand about agriculture and plants. After an informal early schooling, he received an AB from the University of Michigan in 1908 and briefly joined the Michigan Biological Survey. He then joined Columbia University where he became interested in heredity, inspired by T. H. Morgan and E. B. Wilson. He examined the influence of environmental factors on development. He received a PhD in 1911 and became a zoology instructor at the University of Michigan. He began to examine sex determination in rotifers and conducted experiments on mutation induction and crossing in Drosophila. He also conducted experiments on insect biology and took a special interest in polymorphisms such as in the presence or absence of wings in aphids. Shull was a critical opponent of suggestions on mimetic relationships based on human visual observation. He would point out that W. L. McAtee showed from stomach contents of birds that mimics and models were eaten in proportion to their availability. He believed that care needed to be taken to examine the predator and their perception. He was an evolutionist but believed that many of the contemporary researchers were too descriptive and lacking rigour in their claims. In his teaching he believed that there had to be specific principles including cell organization, genetics, systematics and distribution rather than merely descriptions of "type specimens". He also believed that a purely historical approach to teaching biology did not help unify the field.

Shull married zoologist Margaret Jeffrey Buckley, who was an instructor at Grinnell College in Iowa. They had four children, including the geneticist Elizabeth Shull Russell, who later worked at the Jackson Laboratory and was elected to the National Academy of Sciences.
