= Plant Physiology (journal) =

- Discipline: Plant sciences
- Language: English
- Edited by: Yunde Zhao

Publication details
- History: 1926–present
- Publisher: Oxford University Press on behalf of the American Society of Plant Biologists (United States)
- Frequency: Monthly
- Impact factor: 6.9 (2024)

Standard abbreviations
- ISO 4: Plant Physiol.

Indexing
- ISSN: 0032-0889 (print); 1532-2548 (web)
- OCLC no.: 1642351

Links
- Journal homepage

Plant Physiology is a monthly peer-reviewed scientific journal covering research in plant physiology, biochemistry, cell biology, molecular biology, genetics, biophysics, and environmental biology of plants. It is published by the American Society of Plant Biologists and was established in 1926. The current editor-in-chief is Yunde Zhao (University of California, San Diego). According to Clarivate, the journal has a 2024 impact factor of 6.9.

== History ==
Plant Physiology was first published in 1926 as the official journal of the American Society of Plant Physiologists. The journal was established to provide a dedicated venue for research on plant physiological processes at a time when work in plant function and metabolism was expanding rapidly as a distinct scientific discipline.

Charles A. Shull served as the journal’s founding editor-in-chief. Financial support for the launch of the journal included a $20,000 contribution from Shull, which enabled the Society to establish a subscription model and secure library subscriptions during its formative years.

In its early decades, the journal reflected the broadening scope of plant physiology, incorporating research in biochemistry, biophysics, and related experimental approaches as these fields became increasingly integrated into plant science.

== Editors ==
The following individuals have served as editor-in-chief:

- 1926–1946: Charles A. Shull
- 1946–1953: Walter H. Loehwing
- 1953–1957: David R. Goddard
- 1958–1962: Allan H. Brown
- 1963–1992: Martin Gibbs
- 1992–2000: Maarten Chrispeels
- 2000–2005: Natasha Raikhel
- 2005–2013: Donald R. Ort
- 2013–2021: Michael R. Blatt
- 2022–2026: Yunde Zhao
- 2027– : Anna Amtmann
