= SIDALC =

SIDALC Agricultural Information and Documentation Service of the Americas
- Company type: Information service
- Industry: Information
- Founded: 1999
- Headquarters: Turrialba, Costa Rica
- Website: http://www.sidalc.net

The Agricultural Information and Documentation Service of the Americas (SIDALC) is an international agricultural, livestock, forestry and environmental information service in which institutions in 23 countries of the Americas share information and services online. Created in 1999, today it is one of the most important sources of knowledge and information in Latin America and the Caribbean (LAC).

It provides access to information generated throughout the hemisphere and stored in libraries and other related information centers. It contains some two million reference materials including books, magazines and journals, graduate theses, reports, audiovisual materials, maps and photographs.

At present, the SIDALC information system is open to the public, which also permits on-line searches of available digital collections, including full texts, audiovisual materials, photographs, etc. Furthermore, SIDALC is linked to other information systems in a number of countries of the Americas, which provide stakeholders in agriculture and rural territories with access to relevant information and knowledge.

SIDALC's provides access to the intellectual capital of at least 178 national institutions. It is the result of earlier initiatives aimed at management of knowledge and information, all promoted by the Inter-American Institute for Cooperation on Agriculture (IICA), such as the Orton Commemorative Library (founded in 1943); the Scientific Exchange Service (SIC), created in 1958; the Inter-American Association of Agricultural Librarians, Documentalists and Information Specialists (AIBDA), founded in 1965; and the Inter-American Agricultural Information System (AGRINTER), created in 1972.

== Operation ==
SIDALC was created thanks to a grant from the Kellogg Foundation, to the technical leadership assumed by IICA and CATIE and to the participation of a number of national, regional and international organizations.

SIDALC is a community of agricultural, forestry and other information specialists located in different institutions of the Americas interested in providing services openly. They collaborate with one another, “sharing a little so that all can have more,” while conserving their identity and their policies on providing specialized services at no cost or for a fee.

That is greatest competitive advantage of SIDALC. With a hemispheric system to which more than 20 national information systems are linked it is possible to provide access to specialized knowledge on agriculture and rural life in the Americas and to share it with the world.

Also, through SIDALC, it is possible to mobilize human and information resources among countries and regions, promoting and supporting national information management initiatives, facilitating the flow of information and promoting the dissemination and transfer of successful experiences.

During 2019 this alliance, made up of 178 institutions, operates a total of 349 databases, which were consulted by 2,980,919 users, who viewed 16 million pages. Some 39,940 articles were distributed among partners, which represented savings of USD 1,997,000 in knowledge resources mobilized

== Benefits ==
- – Participation in the largest hemispheric information system specializing in agriculture and rural life in the Americas
- – Linkage to international information system, essential for accrediting the quality of institutional services, such as university majors
- – Recognition, nationally and internationally, of the networks and libraries and other related information centers
- – Increase in the demand for services on the part of users, and the positive impact on the reference services of specialized libraries
- – Access to a larger collection of specialized information on agriculture, the environment, forestry and related areas; the AGRI2000 mega base
- – Open access to tools and methodologies for the management of specialized information
- – Exchanges of experiences with specialists and institutions, which helps identify opportunities and find solutions to specific problems
- – International backing of institutional catalogues
- – Greater visibility, at the international level, of institutional collections through SIDALC.NET and Google.com, without the institute losing its identity.

This alliance, made up of 178 institutions, has been providing services for 20 years. It operates a total of 349 databases, which were consulted by 2,980,919 users, who viewed 16 million pages. Some 39,940 articles were distributed among partners, which represented savings of USD 1,997,000 in knowledge resources mobilized

== Products of SIDALC ==
- – A "community of practice" made up of specialists in information management
- – A directory of national networks, libraries and other information centers in Latin America and the Caribbean specializing in agriculture and rural life
- – The AGRI2000 mega base, which contains collections specializing in agriculture, environment, forestry and related areas, with references and electronic resources of all types: texts, audiovisual materials, photographs, maps, etc.
- – A direct link to the National Agricultural Library of the United States, the Agricultural Library of Canada, the Agriculture Network Information Center AGNIC in the United States, the CGIAR virtual library and the AGRIS global system promoted by FAO
- – Access to different agricultural information systems available via Internet, as well as to resource centers and specialized packages of agricultural and rural information from LAC
- – A platform for sharing information management services among countries, and contacting directly the units that provide reference services in the most important specialized libraries of LAC.

== More information ==
The Inter-American Institute for Cooperation on Agriculture (IICA) recognizes that the management of information and knowledge is fundamental for improving agriculture and rural life in the countries of Latin America and the Caribbean (LAC). Both information and knowledge are essential in decision making, in the fields of education and innovation, and in achieving competitiveness and sustainable development.
