= Claribel Ruth Barnett =

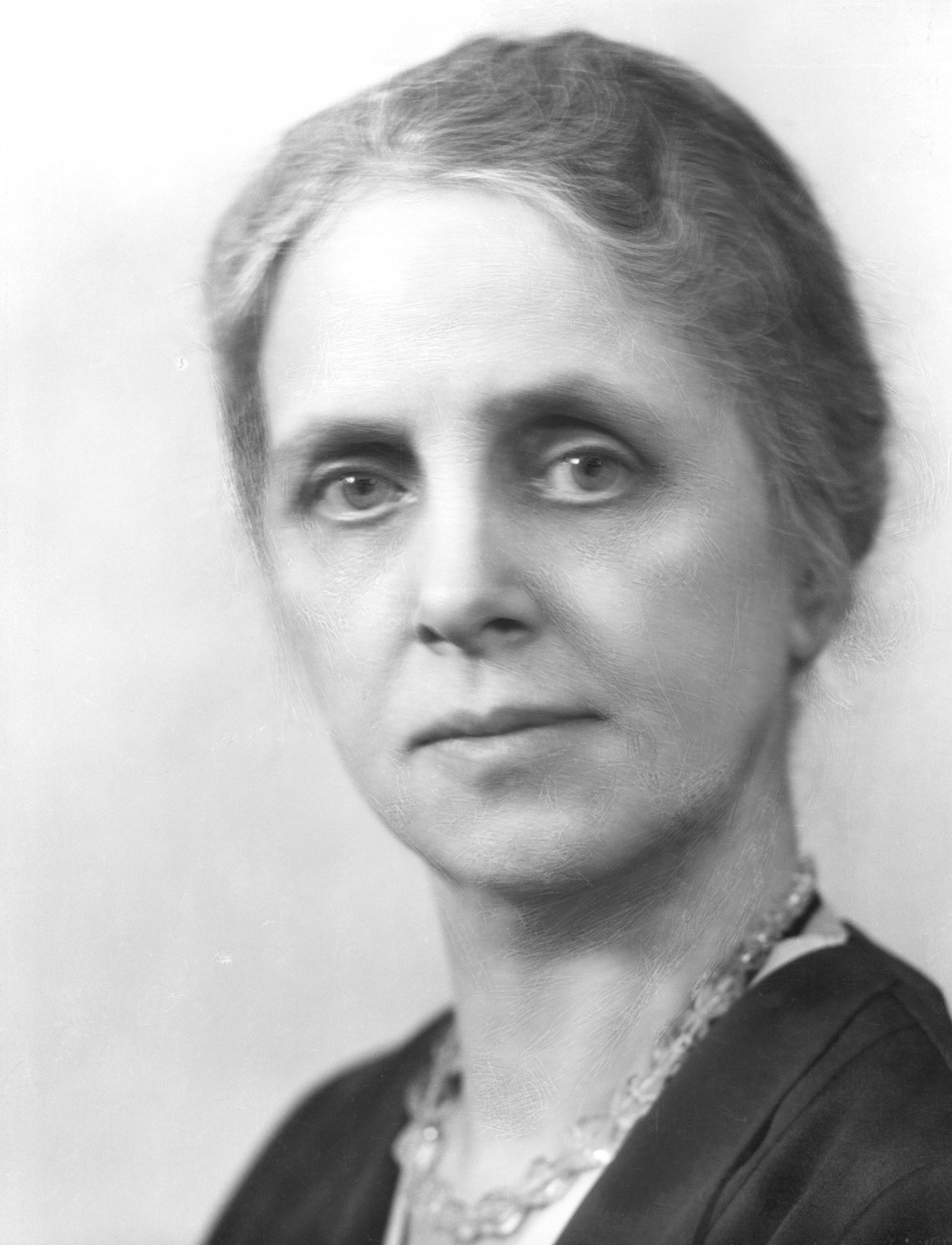
- Born: March 26, 1872; Kent
- Died: March 6, 1951 (aged 78); Washington, D.C.
- Occupation: Librarian
- Employer: United States Department of Agriculture (1901–1940)

Claribel Ruth Barnett (March 26, 1872 – March 6, 1951) was librarian of the United States Department of Agriculture from July 1907 until her retirement in November 1940.

== Early life ==
Claribel Ruth Barnett was born on March 26, 1872, in Kent, Ohio, to George and Lucina (Deuel) Barnett. She attended Kent High School and from 1887 to 1889, Western Reserve Academy. From 1889 to 1893 she attended the University of Michigan, where she received her bachelor's degree. She later received a library science degree from New York State Library School. She moved to Washington, D.C., in 1895.

== Career ==
Barnett moved to Washington, D.C., in 1895 to take up the position of cataloger with the USDA; she would later become the assistant librarian to Josephine A. Clark, department librarian at the time, in 1901. In 1907, she was appointed Clark's successor after leaving the library to take up the post of librarian at Smith College. Barnett took one of the first federal library exams opened to women. She would be the third professional head of the Library (with training) at the USDA. Initially, Barnett had been apprehensive to take the position as the success of female leaders in the USDA often struggled based depending upon the views of the current Secretary of Agriculture. James "Tama Jim" Wilson, secretary at the time, asked her to accept the position and reassured Barnett that she had his support. While Barnett worked to improve library services for USDA employees, she also tried to connect the agricultural libraries of the United States and around the world in order to better serve all patrons.

While there was no legislative directive to requiring cooperation between the USDA library and Land Grant Institutions, and other college libraries, Barnett nonetheless created opportunities for partnership, collaboration, and sharing. In 1910, she organized and chaired the first meeting of the American Library Association's (ALA) Agricultural Library Section; Claribel Barnett wanted to ensure that librarians in agricultural libraries had a place and voice within the association. The Agricultural Library Section's proceedings and papers were published through the association's publication, while gatherings of the group would take place during ALA meetings. Barnett served as chair for the first four years of the section, and again in 1927.

Under Barnett in the 1930s, the National Agricultural Library would pioneer the use of microfilm.

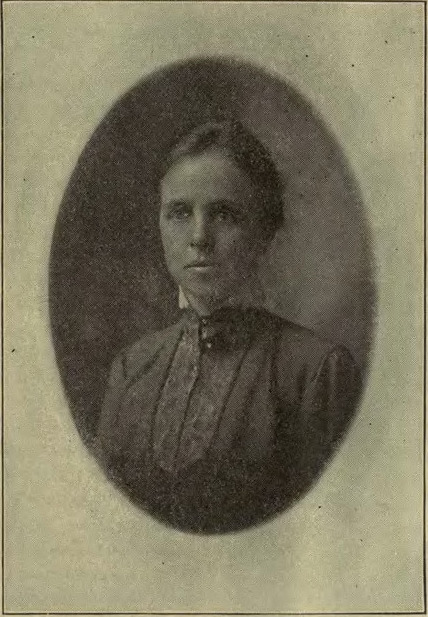
Claribel Ruth Barnett in 1920.

She increased the staff to around 170 and the budget to around $11 million. Under Barnett's leadership the library increased in both size and scope, population multiple branch libraries among the various bureaus of the department and increasing the collection to over 250,000 books and pamphlets.

== Awards and honors ==
Barnett founded the Agricultural Libraries Section of the American Library Association in 1911.

=== Publications ===
- Catalogue of Publications Related to Forestry in the Library of the United States Department of Agriculture, 1912, National Agricultural Library (U.S.)

=== Memberships ===
- College Women's Club
- American Association of University Women
- American Library Association
- ALA Board of Resources of American Libraries
- D.C. Library Association, second vice-president, 1919-1920

Positions Held

President from 1921–22 and Chairman of both the Oberly Memorial Fund Committee (1923-1934) and Agricultural Libraries Section(1910–14, 1927) for the American Library Association.

== Death and legacy ==
Claribel Ruth Barnett died on 6 March 1951 in Washington, D.C.

Claribel Barnett had warm relationships with her employees, who gifted her with a silver service for six upon her retirement. She facilitated the work of her younger cousin Elizabeth Gilmore Holt in her research for the initial volume of A Documentary History of Art through her intellectual support and her care for Elizabeth's five year old daughter, and left her estate to Elizabeth Holt on her death.
