= Ida Kidder =

American librarian

Ida Angeline Kidder
- Born: Ida Angeline Clarke; 30 June 1857; Auburn, New York
- Died: 29 February 1920; Corvallis, Oregon, U.S.
- Education: University of Illinois

Ida A. Kidder (née Clarke; June 30, 1857 – February 29, 1920) was a pioneering librarian and the first professional librarian at Oregon Agricultural College, now Oregon State University, where her students nicknamed her "Mother Kidder".

== Early life ==
Ida Angeline Clarke was born on June 30, 1857, in Auburn, New York. Her father was John C. Clarke (b. October 4, 1833) and her mother was Harriet Angeline Martin (b. 1937). At the age of 20, she graduated from high school in Waverly and became a primary school teacher. At 29, she enrolled in the New York State College for Teachers and became a teacher of Natural Sciences and eventually the principal at a high school in Medina, New York.

On February 26, 1896, she married Lorenzo Kidder at the age of 39 in Sioux City, Iowa.

== Education & Employment ==
She attended both the New York Normal School at Albany and the University of Illinois, finishing her education in 1906. Kidder moved to Washington state where she worked at the Washington State Library at Olympia for a few months before becoming a Library Organizer for Oregon State University in Salem for two years, from there she was recruited by then college president, William Jasper Kerr, to Corvallis, Oregon, where she began work at the Oregon Agricultural College (now Oregon State University).

=== Oregon Agricultural College ===
Kidder was the first professional librarian for the Oregon Agricultural College and started work there in 1908 at the age of 53. When she arrived, there were just over 4,200 volumes in some disarray housed in the Benton Hall Administration building. Kidder was not familiar with Agriculture College Librarianship and reached out to Claribel Ruth Barnett, librarian at the U.S. Department of Agriculture, for assistance, which Barnett provided, and the two formed a lifelong friendship. In an effort to grow her collections, Kidder wrote President Kerr a series of requests for funding, which she received.

After her first six months, Kidder created a "present condition" report for President Kerr where she tallied 7,180 general and reference books, 5,000 government documents, as well as approximately 10,000 pamphlets. These collections were housed in the Benton Hall Administration Building, eventually occupying the whole of the second floor. Kidder was a driving force in expanding the library and its collections. In 1917, Kidder and the student community lobbied for a new library building, which was approved by the OAC Board of Regents and the 1917 Oregon Legislative Assembly, allotting $158,000 for the project. The 57,000 square foot building was completed in 1918 to house the 35,814 volumes and 40,000 pamphlets and bulletins, everything was moved into the new library from Benton Hall by faculty and students due to the wartime labor shortage of WWI. While at OAC, Kidder spent years organizing, arranging, and expanding the library's collections as well as increasing staff numbers from one person to nine.

In addition to her work acquiring materials and space to house them, Kidder was an advocate for learning and did everything she could to support her students. After her first year, Kidder began a mandatory "library practice" course for all freshman to ensure they understood how to use the library to their benefit. She made an effort to expose students to culture and literature in addition to their technical courses. Kidder continued to educate herself in an effort to provide the best help for her students, in 1911 she made a trip to several libraries in the Midwest including Illinois, Purdue, Minnesota, Wisconsin, Iowa State, and John Crerar "in order to get into close touch with the work as it is carried out in other institutions." In 1911, Kidder asked Lucy M. Lewis (1879–1951), a former classmate, to come and work as her Librarian Assistant.

She lived on campus in Waldo Hall and connected with students on a personal level, leading her students to nickname her "Mother Kidder" as early as 1912.

In 1918, W. Homer Maris wrote the school's alma mater, Carry Me Back, and dedicated it to Kidder, "to 'Mother' Kidder in recognition of her ennobling influence and great love felt for her on the part of all who have met under the old 'Trysting Tree.'"

== Community Involvement ==
In her third year at OAC, Kidder offered courses on using the library to local farmers during the winter months, she would also make time to give talks in the community on a range of topics. Kidder also established classes for advanced secretary training. In 1914, Kidder was one of the speakers at the Oregon State Convention of Mothers and Parent-Teacher Association; she gave a talk on "The Proper Literature for Children." In her talk, she gave advice to both teachers and parents on how book impacted a child's psychology and understanding of the world. She received many letters throughout her life and many were former students' requests for suggestions for literature for their children. Kidder gave a talk at the Pacific Northwest Library Association in 1917; her topic was "Libraries and Inspiration." Other speakers addressed how World War I was impacting service, how to gather loan statistics from public libraries, and budget concerns.

== Wartime efforts ==
She donated money to the First Baptist Church fund in 1916, which was gathering contributions to the American Armenian Relief Fund. In 1917, she twice donated to a fund to support Belgian children to the Progressive Business Men's Club of Portland, which was raising money through waste-paper collection and sale, as well as subscriptions to the organization, to give to the Patriotic Conservation League.

She served as a hospital librarian for the summer of 1918 at Camp Lewis, near Tacoma, Washington. The soldiers there began calling her "Mother Kidder" soon after her arrival. Kidder would receive letters from soldiers around the world, even receiving letters addressed simply "Mother Kidder, Oregon", and she replied to each one.

== Health ==
Beginning in her mid-50s, Kidder suffered from arthritis and a cardiac ailment which made it difficult for her to walk. In 1917, she began to use an electric cart to get around, which was a novelty at the time, and the student paper, The Barometer held a contest to name it. While "Kidder Car" was an early student favorite, Kidder chose the winning name, the "Wicker Mobile" which was the paper's editor, William James O’Neill, entry. Kidder suffered a heart attack in November 1919 which left her weak. In mid-January 1920, she asked President Kerr for a leave of absence without pay but he granted her leave of absence with pay

One of the last letters Ida received was from her friend, Claribel Ruth Barnett, was on January 29, 1920, where Barnett spoke of meeting a recent OAC graduate who "spoke so beautifully of you. I am sure it would have done your heart good to hear him. Everyone who comes from Oregon speaks the same way. You have certainly endeared yourself to all who have been there."

== Death and funeral ==
Kidder died on February 29, 1920, of a brain hemorrhage. Her death occurred during an influenza pandemic which limited social gatherings. On the day of her funeral, March 2, 1920, her casket was displayed in the library, and classes were cancelled from 10 am to 2 pm.

Her funeral was held on the library steps. Her casket was carried on the shoulders of students one mile to the train station, followed by a procession of faculty while the band played Chopin's Funeral March. She was cremated in Portland.

After she died The Agricultural Libraries Section of the American Library Association passed a memorial resolution praising her contributions to agricultural librarianship. Kidder's friend and colleague, Cornelia Marvin Pierce, wrote in the April 1920 edition of Public Libraries: "Her influence on the students of Oregon Agricultural College was greater than that of any other member of the faculty."

From 1927 to 1963, what was later OSU Fairbanks Hall was named the Kidder Hall. In 1962, the old library building built in 1918, and sits across from the current Valley Library, was renovated and renamed Kidder Hall in her honor. Her ghost is said to haunt the fourth floor of Waldo Hall, her former campus residence.
