= AGRICOLA =

American online agricultural database

- Producer: United States Department of Agriculture (USA)
- Languages: English

Access
- Providers: United States National Agricultural Library, United States Department of Agriculture
- Cost: Free and Subscription

Coverage
- Disciplines: Agriculture
- Record depth: Index, some abstracts
- Format coverage: Journals, Books, Audiovisual, other
- Temporal coverage: 17th century - present
- Update frequency: Daily

Links
- Website: agricola.nal.usda.gov
- Title list(s): (defunct)

AGRICOLA (AGRICultural OnLine Access) is an online database created and maintained by the United States National Agricultural Library of the United States Department of Agriculture.

The database serves as the catalog and index for the collections of the United States National Agricultural Library. It also provides public access to information on agriculture and allied fields.

Agricola is a Latin word which translates to farmer, from ager 'field' and -cola '-tiller' or '-cultivator'.

== Scope ==
AGRICOLA indexes a wide variety of publications covering agriculture and its allied fields, including, "animal and veterinary sciences, entomology, plant sciences, forestry, aquaculture and fisheries, farming and farming systems, agricultural economics, extension and education, food and human nutrition, and earth and environmental sciences." Materials are indexed using terms from the National Agricultural Library Glossary and Thesaurus.

=== PubAg ===
A related database, PubAg, was released in 2015 and is focused on the full-text publications from USDA scientists, as well as some of the journal literature. PubAg was designed for a broad range of users, including farmers, scientists, scholars, students, and the general public.

The distinctions between AGRICOLA and PubAg include:

"AGRICOLA serves as the public catalog of the National Agricultural Library. It contains records for all of the holdings of the library. It also contains citations to articles, much like PubAg. AGRICOLA also contains citations to many items that, while valuable and relevant to the agricultural sciences, are not peer-reviewed journal articles. Also, AGRICOLA has a different interface. So, while there is some overlap between the two resources, they are different in significant ways. There are no plans to eliminate AGRICOLA."

== See also ==
- List of academic databases and search engines
- Lists of academic journals
- List of open-access journals
- List of scientific journals
- Google Scholar
