= Ernestine H. Stevens =

American librarian

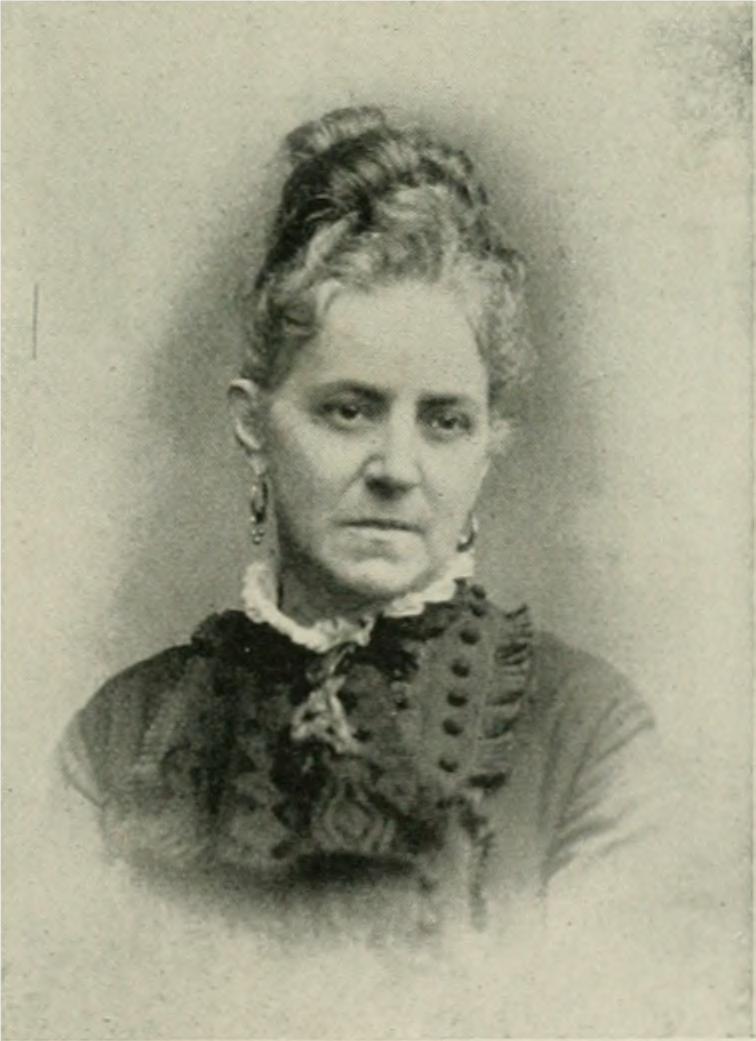
- Born: October 25, 1830
- Died: February 5, 1917 (aged 86)
- Occupation: Librarian
- Known for: Director of the United States National Agricultural Library

Ernestine Hebert Stevens (October 25, 1830 – February 5, 1917) was a librarian and director of the United States National Agricultural Library from 1877 through 1893, the organization's first female head librarian. During her tenure the total number of volumes went from 7,000 to 20,000 items and the general expenses rose from $1000 to $3000. Stevens organized the printed materials and replaces copious museum objects with library publications. During this time the Commissioner of Agriculture, Norman Colman, stressed that the department was in need of a well-managed and well-organized library. The library developed a card catalog system under her tenure.

Under Department Of Agriculture Secretary J. Sterling Morton, many women who worked in the department were demoted and their salaries reduced. Morton asked Stevens to resign, and replaced her with William Parker Cutter on August 27, 1893. She was retained as a clerk at a 30% pay cut. Cutter continued to professionalize the library.

== Early life ==
Stevens was born Ernestine Hebert in 1829 in Iberville, Louisiana to Valery Amant Hebert and Marie-Clarisse Bouche Hebert, and had a French Huguenot background. She was fluent in both French and Spanish. She was married to General Walter Husted Stevens, a West Point officer, on July 3, 1850, and traveled with him extensively. The couple had six children, two of whom lived to adulthood. General Stevens died of while in Mexico, on November 12, 1867 leaving her with two children, Gustave and Ernestine, to support. She settled in Baltimore, Maryland, initially running a small school, teaching students in French and English. She was initially given a job in the patent office doing scientific translation but resigned when denied a permanent job which went to one of her boss's associates. She was rehired at the agricultural department as assistant librarian and was promoted to director when her boss retired on November 1, 1877.
