= Eunice Rockwood Oberly =

American agricultural librarian

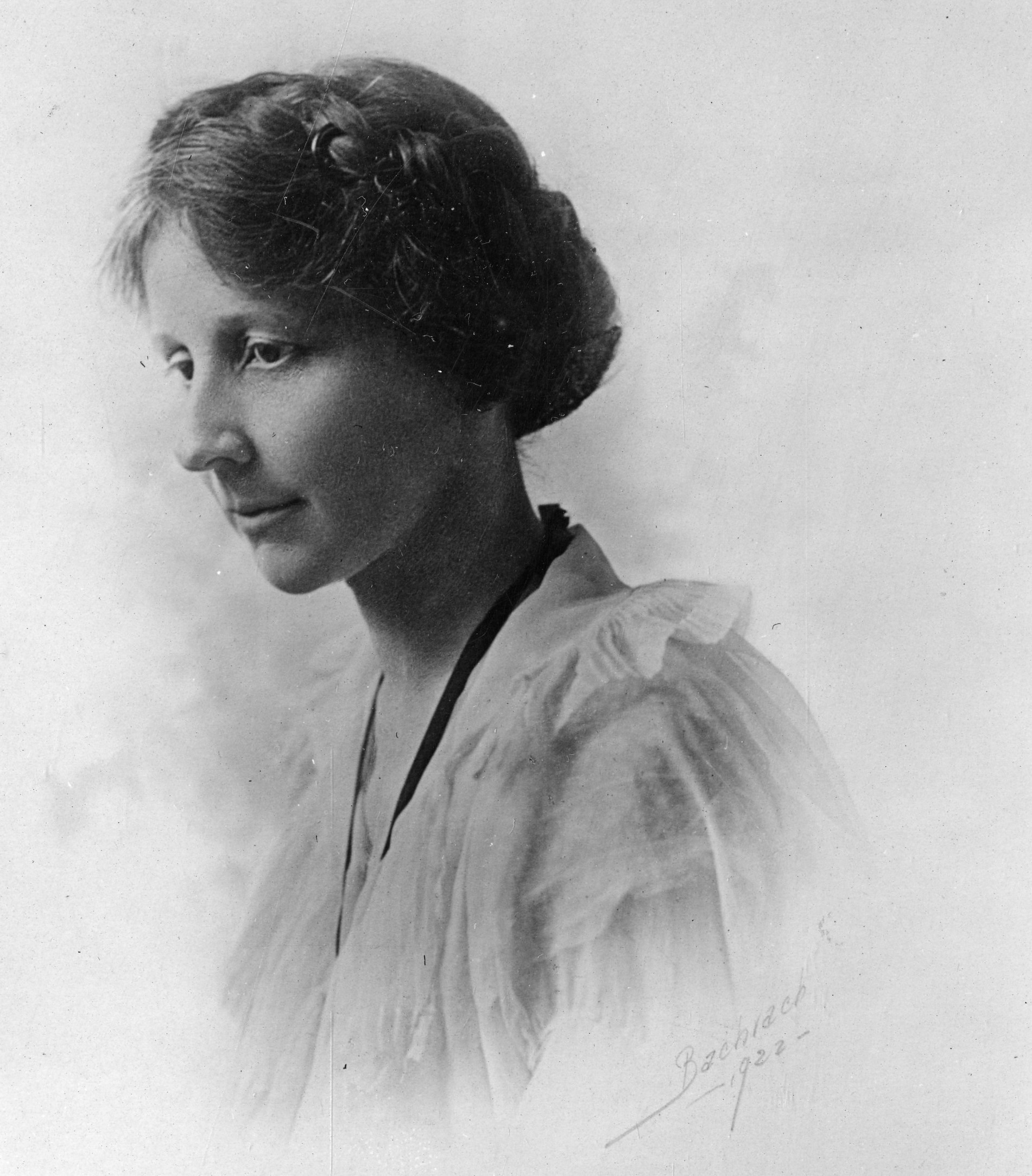
- Born: March 7, 1878; Cairo
- Died: 1921 (aged 42–43)
- Occupation: Librarian, bibliographer
- Employer: United States Department of Agriculture (1900–1921)

Eunice Rockwood Oberly (March 7, 1878 – November 5, 1921) was a librarian who spent her career with the United States Department of Agriculture. She is best known for her work as the librarian of the Bureau of Plant Industry and for compiling the Check List of Publication of the State Agricultural Experiment Stations on the Subject of Plant Pathology 1876-1920.

== Early life ==
Eunice R. Oberly was born March 7, 1878, in Cairo, Illinois. Her father, John H. Oberly was editor of the "Cairo Bulletin" and she was the youngest of seven daughters. In 1885, the family moved to Washington, D.C. as her father took up the role of Civil Service Commissioner; he would later become Commissioner of Indian Affairs under President Cleveland. Oberly attended public school in DC and went on to graduate from Vassar College in June, 1900, where she served as class historian.

== Career ==
Oberly began her career with the United States Department of Agriculture doing bibliographical work in the Division of Animal Industry. She was later appointed to librarian of the Division of Vegetable Physiology and Pathology. In 1908, the library of Vegetable Physiology and Pathology would be consolidated with the Office of Botanical Investigations to form the library of the Bureau of Plant Industry, of which Oberly was appointed librarian. The Bureau of Plant Industry Library's focus was not so much on books themselves, but rather on indexing and cataloging botanical literature and making it readily available to the workers and researchers of the bureau from libraries elsewhere in Washington, specifically the Library of Congress and the United States Department of Agriculture Library. Oberly's ambition was to make the holdings of libraries across the country more readily available to researchers. To this end, she contributed bibliographies on plant diseases for printing in the Phytopathology journal beginning in 1914 and which her staff continued after her death. She later developed a circular from the Bureau of a mimeographed list of botanical literature which contained full citations of all important botanical literature which had been received by the Washington libraries and was issued every two weeks to those who requested it.

Oberly would go on to create two publications called "Bibliographical Contributions" which were put out by the Department of Agriculture Library. The first was published in 1918 and called Bibliographical Contributions Number 1: Check list of Publications of the Department of Agriculture on the Subject of Plant Pathology. She would then lead the development of Biographical Contributions Number 2: Check List of Publications of the State Agricultural Experiment Stations on the Subject of Plant Pathology 1876-1920, which was completed and published in 1922 by her assistant Jessie M. Allen, a year after Oberly's death. Oberly also wrote to improve the standing and reputation of the scientific library and to improve clarity in scientific literature writing. Outside of her librarian work, Oberly was socially and politically active in the Washington, D.C., area. Oberly was president of the Vassar Alumnae association of the D.C. area and she was a member of the American Library Association, which she joined in 1906. She became locally known for her work during World War I to help get ambulances to France and for her work with the suffragette movement as an organizer of the Woman Suffrage Council in D.C.

== Honors and publications ==
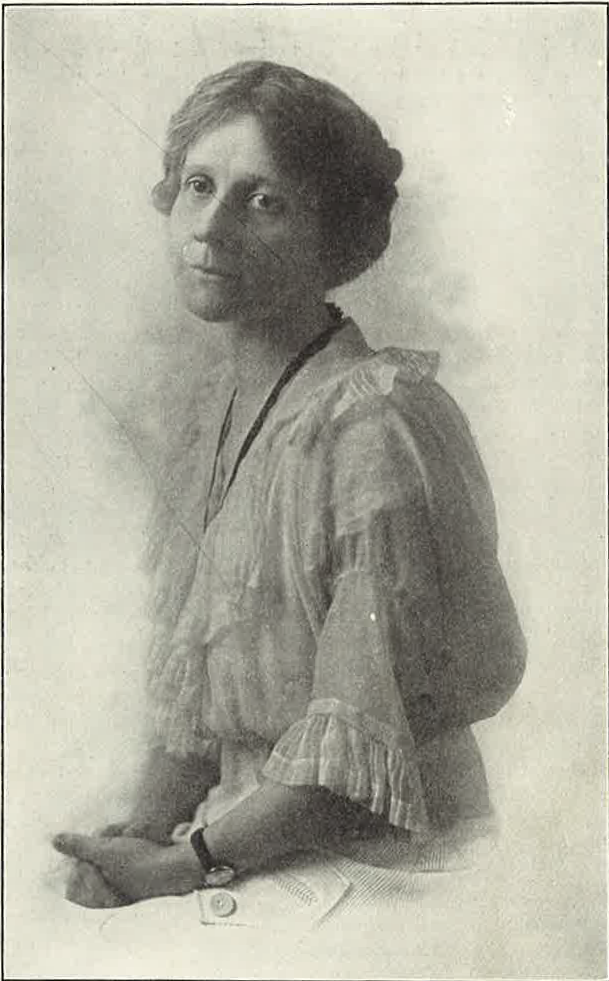
Eunice Rockwood Oberly

She served as representative on the Congressional Joint Commission on Reclassification of Federal Employees, where she helped successfully gain fairer recognition of library activities. She published multiple works on bibliography and agricultural librarianship:

- Bibliographical Contributions Number 1: Check List of Publications of the Department of Agriculture on the Subject of Plant Pathology, 1837–1918
- The Agricultural Libraries Section of the American Library Association (1919) from Science (republished from the Bulletin of the American Library Association)
- Bibliographical Contributions Number 2: Check list of Publications of the State Agricultural Experiment Stations on the Subject of Plant Pathology 1876-1920
- Libraries of Scientific Research Institutions Round Table (1921) from Bulletin of the American Library Association
- Abstracts and Titles of Scientific Articles From the Librarian's Standpoint (1921) from Science
- The Contribution of Librarians to Agricultural History and Research (1922) from The Library Journal

== Death and legacy ==
Eunice R. Oberly died suddenly on November 5, 1921, at her home in Washington, D.C. After Oberly's death, her friends donated $800 in 1923 to the American Library Association as a memorial to her. The income from the donation was to be used as an annual reward to the compiler of the best bibliography of the year in the field of natural sciences or agriculture. The ALA board accepted the reward and transmitted it to the ALA endowment fund for investment and maintenance and a committee was assigned to administer it. The award is still administered biennially as the STS Oberly Award for Bibliography in the Agricultural or Natural Sciences.
