= The Valley Library =

Library on the Oregon State University campus in Corvallis, Oregon, U.S.

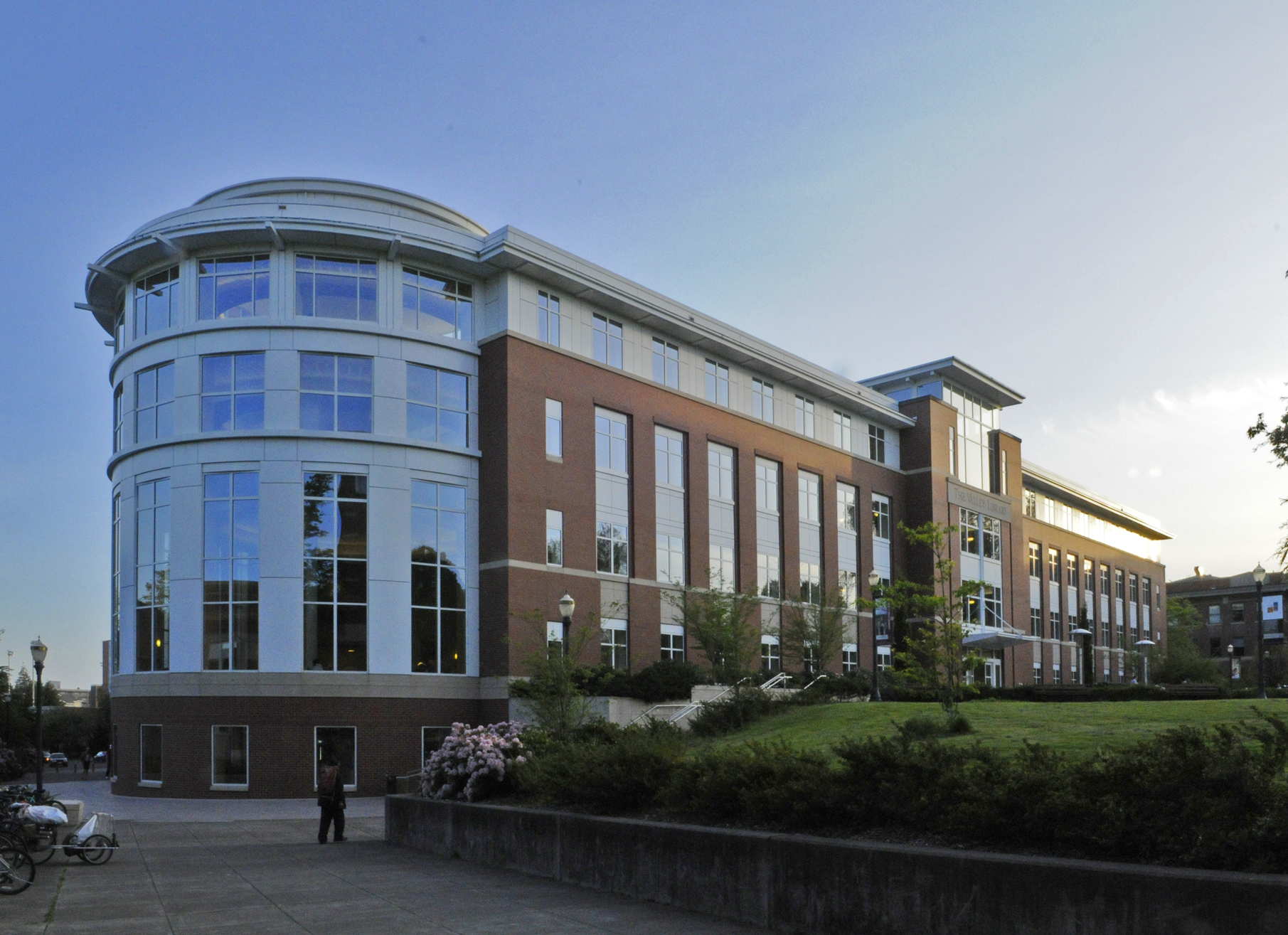
- North side of the library with the rotunda on the eastern end
- 44.56511°N 123.2760°W
- Location: Corvallis, Oregon, United States
- Type: Academic
- Established: 1887
- Branch of: OSU Libraries

Collection
- Size: 1.4 million volumes 14,000 serials 500,000 maps and government documents
- Legal deposit: Federal Depository Library

Access and use
- Circulation: 347,000

Other information
- Budget: $15.4 million
- Director: Anne-Marie Deitering
- Employees: 84 (FTE)
- Website: https://library.oregonstate.edu/

The Valley Library is the primary library of Oregon State University and is located at the school's main campus in Corvallis in the U.S. state of Oregon. Established in 1887, the library was placed in its own building for the first time in 1918, what is now Kidder Hall. The current building opened in 1963 as the William Jasper Kerr Library and was expanded and renamed in 1999 as The Valley Library. The library is named for philanthropist F. Wayne Valley, who played football for Oregon State.

One of three libraries for Oregon State, The Valley Library stores more than 1.4 million volumes, 14,000 serials, and more than 500,000 maps and government documents. It is designated as a Federal Depository Library and is also a repository for state documents. The six-story library building is of a contemporary, neoclassical style with a red-brick exterior highlighted by white sections along the top and on part of the eastern side. The eastern side includes a white-faced rotunda that features a two-story atrium on the main floor.

== History ==
=== Origins ===
Oregon State University was established in 1868. The Oregon Legislative Assembly appropriated $1,000 to the school to buy books for a library in 1876, marking the first instance of the legislature giving funds to the school for a library. In 1887, the library was established at the school, and in 1890, May Warren was hired as the first full-time librarian. By 1893, the library's collection had grown to 1,950 volumes. After adding 2,600 volumes from 1899 to 1900, the collection stood at 5,000 volumes.

At that time the library was a free, general library with both circulating and reference collections with A. J. Stimpson serving as the librarian. The library also had 6,000 pamphlets at that time and the annual circulation was 8,000. In July 1908, Ida Kidder was appointed as OAC’s first professionally trained librarian; her arrival marked a period of unparalleled growth. By 1909, the collection had grown to 10,000 volumes and 10,000 pamphlets; R. J. Nichols was a librarian. The library collection continued to grow and totaled 36,478 volumes in 1918. By 1922 the collection had grown to 73,000 volumes, and Lucy M. Lewis served as the school's librarian.

By 1940, the collections at the library had increased to a total of about 130,000 volumes and 1,400 serials. Included in the collections were a variety of rare items, such as a page from the 1642 printing of the Polychronicon, a 1628 book of poems written in Latin, and a 1769 bible printed by John Baskerville, among others.

=== New library construction ===
In February 1917, the state legislature gave the school $65,000 towards construction of a building to house the library. Oregon Agricultural College opened a new library in 1918, marking the first time that the library had its own building. Prior to 1918, the library had been housed on the second floor of the neighboring Administration Building, now known as Benton Hall. When the new building was completed, the school built a temporary trellis between the two buildings in order to more easily transfer the books to their new location. Initially, the new building also housed offices and classrooms, but within a decade the library expanded to occupy all of the structure. John V. Bennes designed the new building, as well as many of the campus buildings constructed during that period.

The new library was remodeled on several occasions, with a new wing added in 1941. The 1918 building was located on the southeast corner of Campus Way and Waldo Place and after the 1941 addition, had about 76,000 square feet (7,100 m^{2}) of space spread over three floors and a full basement. Designed in the neoclassical style, the exterior was made of bricks and contained decorative plaques constructed of concrete, with the gabled roof covered with tile. The original design had two-story reading rooms, which were converted to single-story rooms in the 1950s. Construction on the new wing of the library started in 1940 and was designed by Bennes, the same architect who designed the original structure. He also designed a matching wing for the other side, but that wing was never added. At that time the building was open from 7:50 am until 10 pm on weekdays, and 2 pm to 5 pm on Sundays.

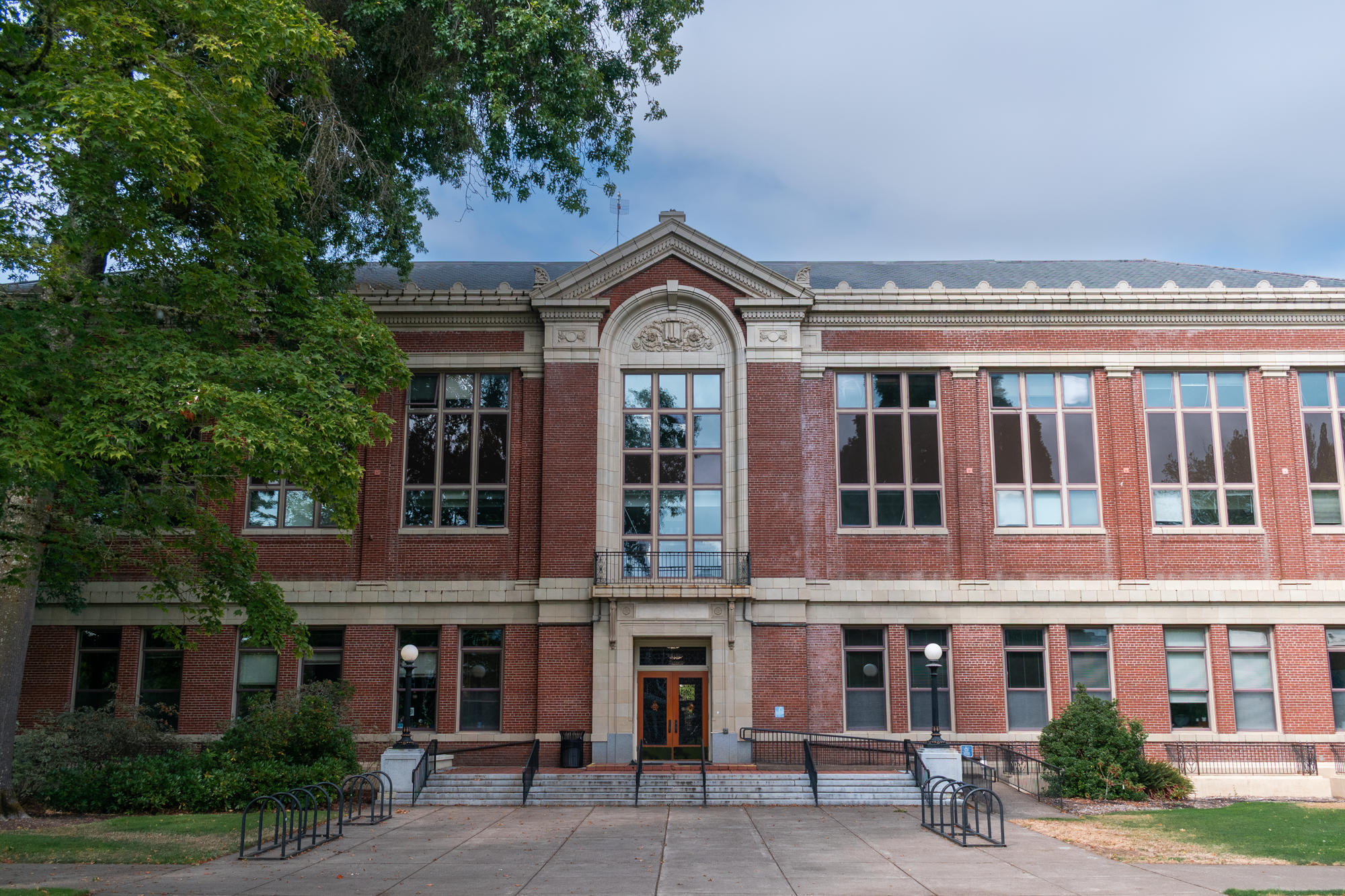
Kidder Hall, the former home of the library

=== Notable gifts and events ===
A mural painted by J. Leo Fairbanks was added to the main reading room in 1929 as a gift from the school's class of 1925. The mural was titled Recorded Information and was the second mural in that room by Fairbanks, who was the longtime head of the school's art department.

Beginning in 1932, Mary J. L. McDonald made the then-largest donation of books to the library when she donated volumes worth just over $10,000. She donated a total of over 1,000 items that included a complete works of Abraham Lincoln valued at $4,800. In 1936, the Works Progress Administration gave a decorative archway to the library to be installed over the south entrance to the building. The library received a bequest of about 5,500 volumes valued at about $15,000 in December 1947 from William H. Galvani's estate. This donation overtook that of McDonald to become the largest received by the library up to that time.

The library was among several buildings vandalized by University of Oregon students in October 1945 during the run-up to the Civil War football game between the two schools.

=== Kerr Library ===
The school's library collection grew to 193,479 volumes in 1943. Previously known simply as The Library, the building and library were renamed in 1954 as the William Jasper Kerr Library. Kerr was Oregon State's longest serving president, holding the office from 1907 until 1932 when he became the first chancellor of what is now the Oregon University System.

In May 1960, the then Oregon State College was advanced $19,000 by the federal government to plan for a new $2.17 million building. The new building was designed by architects Hamlin & Martin, and the cost rose to $2.4 million by the time the school accepted bids on the project in April 1962. Ground was broken on the project on May 1, 1962, with Shields Construction Company as the general contractor for the project. The new building would double the size of Oregon State's library.

Completed in 1963, the new library was built on Jefferson Street, its present location, and the name was transferred from the old building. At that time the building was four stories tall, but the school planned for a future expansion. During the original construction, slabs for two additional floors were placed on the roof. Oregon State began construction in the Fall of 1970 to add these new floors, with completion coming in the Fall of 1971. The old library building was remodeled and became Kidder Hall in 1964, named in honor of former librarian Ida Mae Kidder. Previously, Fairbanks Hall had carried the moniker of Kidder Hall, starting in 1927. By 1968 the collection had increased to 538,000 volumes.

Rodney K. Waldron served as the head of the library from 1954 until 1984. In the same year as Waldron's departure, Melvin R. George took over as director of the library, which at that time had a $4.5 million annual budget and 72 employees. In 1986, a room was added to the library to accommodate a donation from alumnus Linus Pauling, which consisted of his papers and two Nobel Prizes.

=== The Valley Library ===
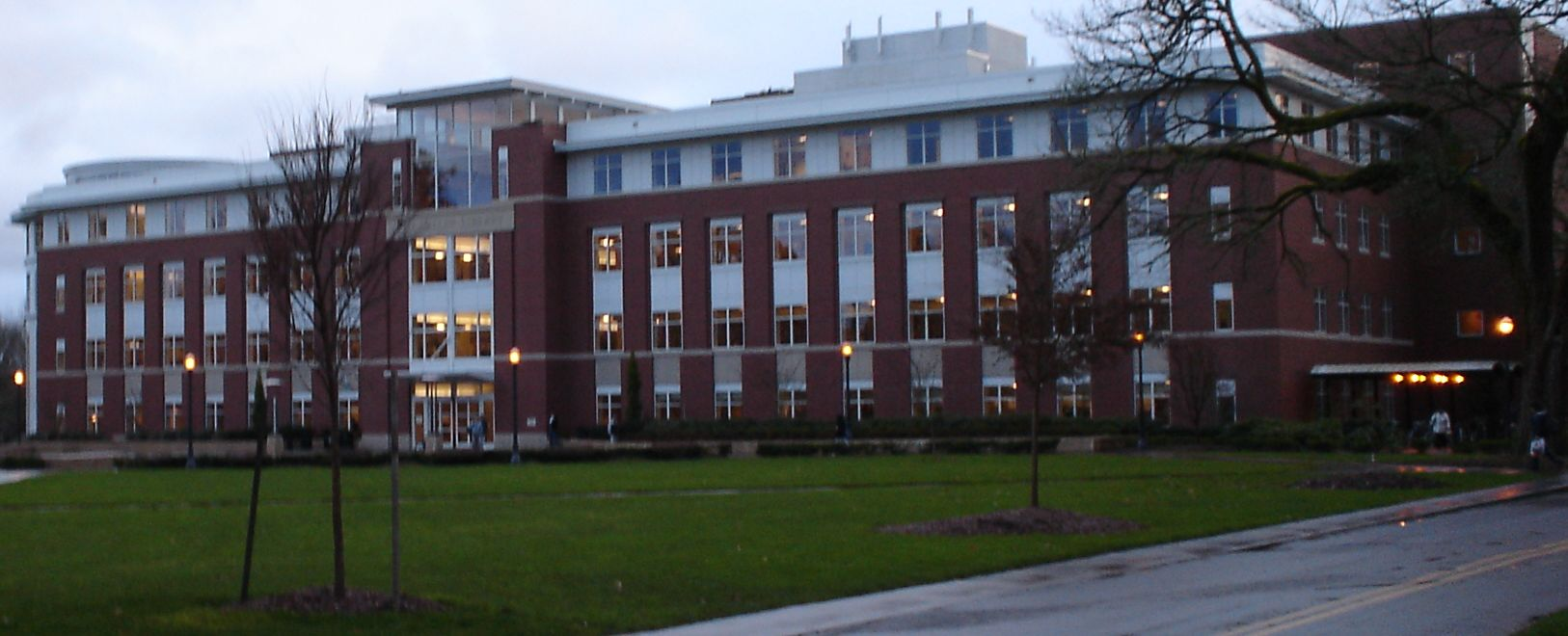
Northern and western sides of the library after expansion completed in 1999

The collections of the library continued to grow, reaching 1,275,473 volumes in 1993. In 1999, the building was renamed as The Valley Library after an extensive expansion and renovation. Renovations took three years and cost $47 million to complete. That year the library was selected by The Library Journal as the Library of the Year, the first time an academic library had won the distinction.

Librarians at Valley Library began using text messaging in March 2010 to communicate with some library patrons, and earlier started to loan out Amazon's Kindle readers, pre-loaded with a library of e-books. In April, the school started allowing students to use the library 24-hours-a-day from Sunday through Thursday to test whether there was enough demand to allow 24-hour access on a permanent basis. The program was sponsored by the Associated Students of Oregon State University and paid for by university technology funds, and was due in part to the closure of some computer labs that had been 24-hour study areas.

== Facilities ==
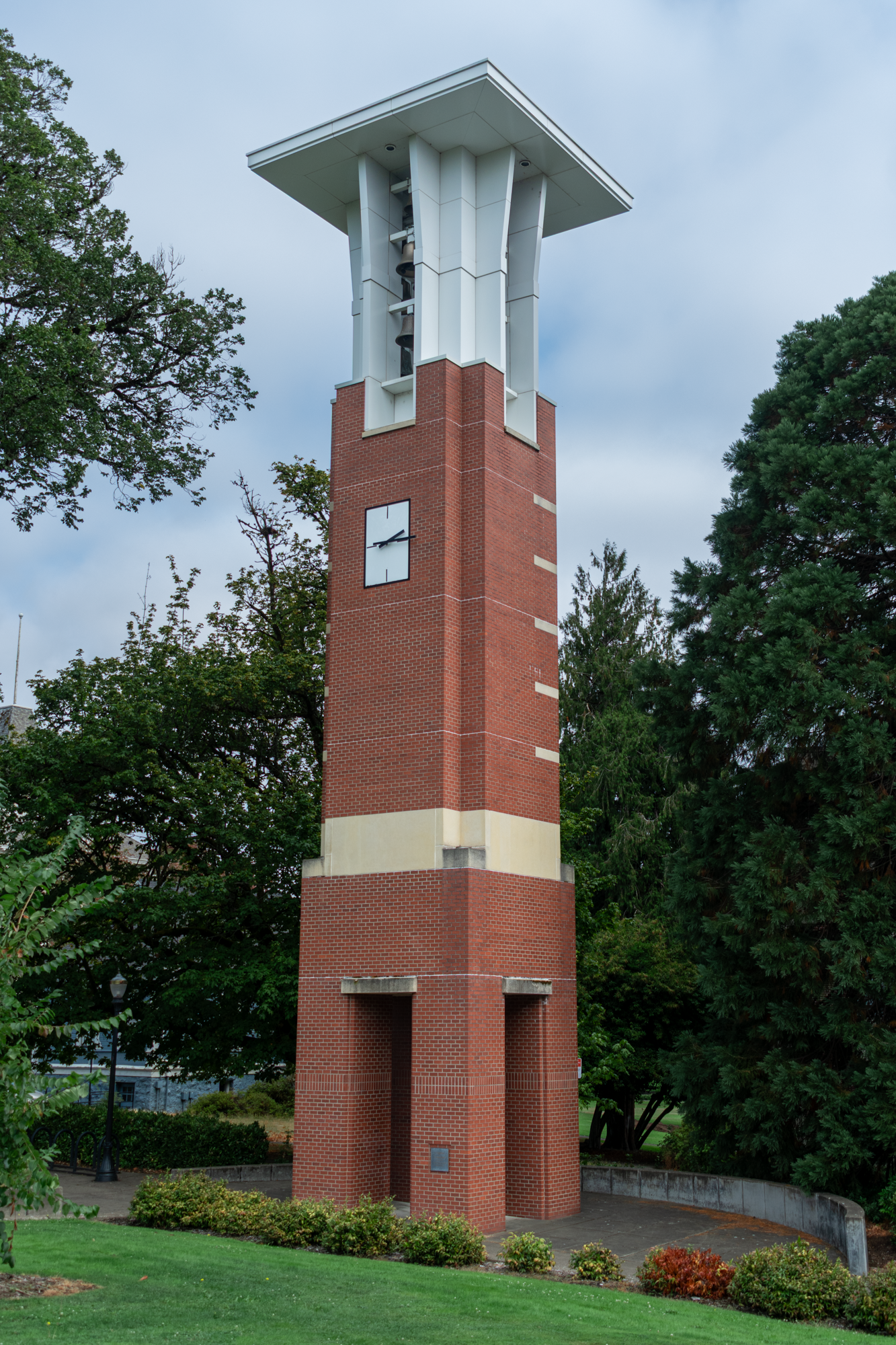
Campanile overlooking the Library Quad

The Valley Library is a six-story, rectangular building with a rotunda on the east side. Designed in a contemporary, neoclassical style, the structure has a veneer of red brick, with white-colored aluminum solar screening on the rotunda and the fifth floor of the north side added for decoration. The internal support structure consists of steel beams and concrete slabs.

Below ground-level on the north side, the first floor includes a cafe and study rooms. The main floor, which is the second floor, includes a two-story atrium, the circulation desk and information desk, a student multimedia studio, computer stations, and a 3D printing station. The undergraduate writing studio is housed on the second floor of the Valley Library, after moving from its previous location in Waldo Hall in fall 2017. The third floor contains collections of atlases, government documents, microforms and readers, and hosts the Mole Hole's chemistry tutoring services. The south end of the fourth floor houses the library's offices, including library administration, central web services and the Division of Extended Campus. A media collection and the Special Collections and Archives Research Center are located on the fifth floor. The sixth floor is a silent study area for graduate students and only covers the southern two-thirds of the structure.

Directly north of the building is the Library Quad, originally known as the East Quadrangle. The approximately 2.6-acre (1.1 ha) area was laid out in 1910 and was registered as part of the Oregon State University Historic District on the National Register of Historic Places in June 2008. A bell tower, or campanile, was added on the eastern edge of the quad in 2001. Dedicated to alumnus H. Dean Papé, the 68-foot (21 m) tall tower has five bells and a clock.

== Operations ==
One of three libraries for Oregon State University, The Valley Library serves as the main library, and is located on the main campus in Corvallis. The other two libraries are the Marilyn Potts Guin Library at the Hatfield Marine Science Center in Newport and the library at the Cascades Campus in Bend. Faye Chadwell is the University Librarian as well as the OSU Press Director.

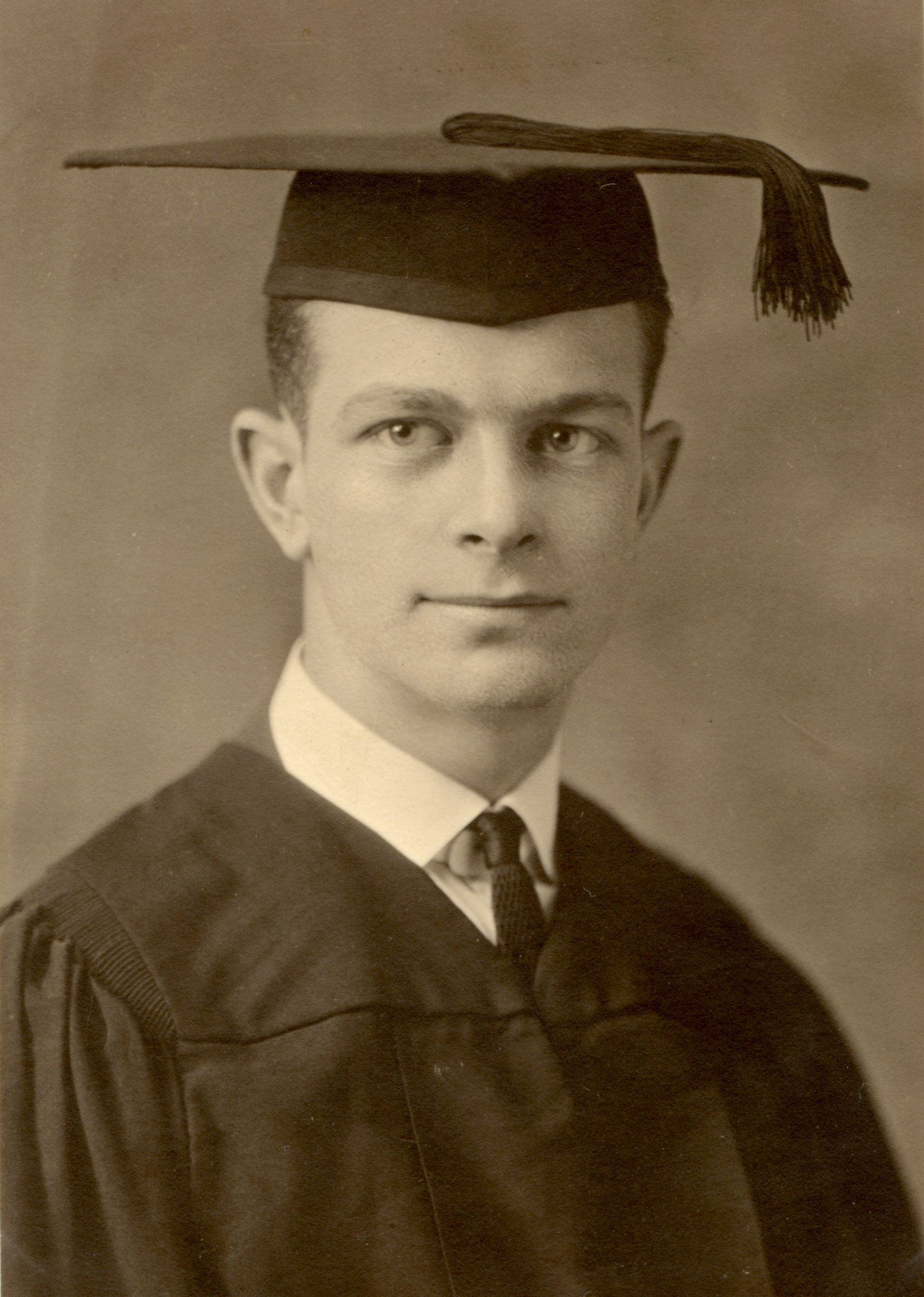
Linus Pauling at graduation in 1922

As of 2008, the libraries, combined, employed about 120 people (FTE), of which 23 were librarians. The three had a total of almost 1.6 million volumes in the collections, 16,992 serials, 2.1 million microform documents, and 3,849 e-books. The Valley Library alone contained 1.4 million volumes and 14,000 serials out of those totals. Valley also has over 500,000 government documents and maps, as it has served as a Federal Depository Library since 1907 and is a deposit library for the state government as well. The three libraries combined had a budget of $10.8 million and a circulation of 347,000 while servicing 24,000 inter-library loans and averaging about 34,000 people per week at the libraries.

=== Collections ===
The Valley Library includes a variety of special collections in addition to its main collection. Most notably are the Ava Helen and Linus Pauling Papers that contain 4,111 books and 2,230 boxes of material from the two alums of Oregon State. Separate from the library, the school is also home to the Linus Pauling Institute.

Other collections in the Special Collections and Archives Research Center include the Atomic Energy and Nuclear History Collections that contains 294 feet (90 m) of items, the McDonald Collection with 2,680 items that date back as far as 2000 BC, two collections concerning the history of science, and 30 linear feet in the Nursery and Seed Trade Catalogues, among others. Also contained in the Special Collections and Archives are around 200,000 photographs, memorabilia, campus publications, and a variety of other specimens related to the history of Oregon State University and its faculty's work. The Oregon Hops and Brewing Archives is also housed within the Special Collections and Archives, which collects materials related to hops and brewing within the Northwest.

The Special Collections and Archives Research Center also include the papers of Bernard Malamud, William Appleman Williams, Milton Harris, Paul Emmett, David P. Shoemaker, Ewan Cameron, Fritz Marti, Eugene Starr, and Roger Hayward. The library is decorated throughout with 120 pieces of the Northwest Art Collection, and serves as an art gallery. Oregon's Percent for Art law set aside one percent of construction costs for artwork, which was then selected by the library along with the Oregon Arts Commission.
