= Mary Anna Day =

American botanist (1852–1924)

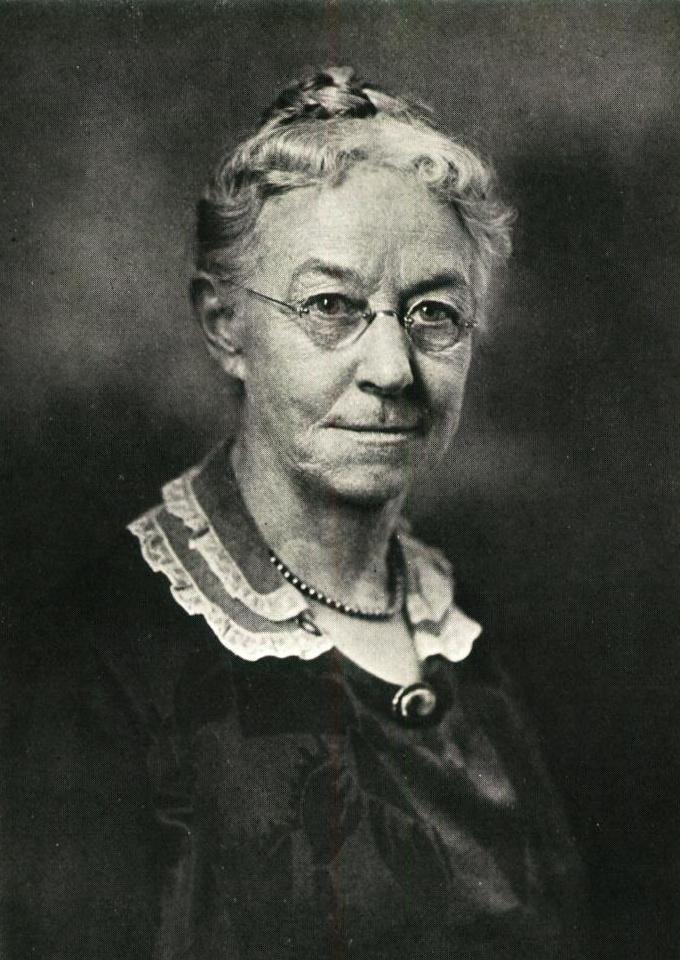
- Born: October 12, 1852; Nelson, New Hampshire
- Died: January 27, 1924 (aged 71); Cambridge, Massachusetts

Mary Anna Day (1852–1924) was an American botanist and librarian at the Gray Herbarium of Harvard University from 1893 to 1924. She edited and compiled the Card Index of New Genera, Species, and Varieties of American Plants, a quarterly publication that was considered "indispensable" to botanists. By 1923, the publication contained about 170,000 cards. Her publications also include a "List of local floras of New England" and "Herbariums of New England" for the New England Botanical Club.

== Early life ==
Day was born on October 12, 1852, in Nelson, New Hampshire, the daughter of Sewell and Hannah (née Wilson) Day. During childhood, Day moved with her family to Lancaster, Massachusetts, and went to school at Lancaster Academy. From 1871 to 1880, Day worked as a public school teacher in Massachusetts and public librarian in Clinton, Massachusetts.

On January 1, 1893, Day moved to Cambridge, Massachusetts, where she was appointed librarian of the Gray Herbarium of Harvard University. Her work involved checking bibliographical references, proofreading manuscripts, preparing indexes and statistics on the library and herbarium collections." Day's first major assignment was the verification of about 5,000 bibliographical references in a collection of manuscripts by Asa Gray and Sereno Watson, which were being prepared for a posthumous publication by the curator William Coolidge Lane. Day aided in the publication of many botanical works, notably Gray's Synoptical Flora of North America and the 7th edition of Gray's Manual of Botany.

== Card Index of New Genera, Species, and Varieties of American Plants ==
Day's most important work was her contributions to the Card Index of New Genera, Species, and Varieties of American Plants, a quarterly publication that was begun by Josephine Adelaide Clark, who preceded Day as librarian of the Gray Herbarium. In 1903, after the publication of the first 20 issues (about 28,000 cards), the work was turned over to the herbarium. Day prepared the publication between her regular duties as a librarian, indexing over 130 scientific serials, including foreign language monographs. Upon its completion in November 1923, the index contained 170,000 cards.

== Death ==
Day fell seriously ill in 1922, but recovered to return to work at the age of 70. In November 1923 she again became sick, and retired due to her health. She died January 27, 1924, in Cambridge, Massachusetts, at the age of 72.
