= Agriculture Network Information Center =

The Agriculture Network Information Collective (AgNIC, formerly the Agriculture Network Information Center) alliance was formed in 1995 by a group of four land grant institutions – Cornell University, Iowa State University, the University of Arizona, and the University of Nebraska–Lincoln, as well as the U.S. Department of Agriculture's National Agricultural Library (NAL). In 1998, NAL assumed the role as "secretariat" to move the partnership forward. Members were committed to creating a voluntary "alliance" dedicated to providing internet access to quality, authoritative agricultural information, and specialized reference services.

The organization listed 54 organizations and universities among its partners in 2025. University libraries affiliated with land-grant colleges, as well as other institutions, including the International Rice Research Institute, the American Farmland Trust, the Agricultural Information and Documentation Service for America (SIDALC) and the University of Buenos Aires, are working together with NAL to develop the AgNIC Alliance, its collections and services, and the technologies upon which it relies.

Unlike most science and technology disciplines, agriculture has a mechanism for distilling and distributing research to those who need it. Historically, state and local extension staff research topics, synthesize, and prepare information for easy consumption, often on an “as needed” basis. Forming partnerships between libraries and subject specialists has been the cornerstone of AgNIC.

AgNIC recently partnered with the United States Agricultural Information Network (USAIN) and the Center for Research Libraries on Project Ceres, which awards funding for “small projects that preserve print materials essential to the study of the history and economics of agriculture and make those materials accessible through digitization.”

== Governance ==
AgNIC members agreed early in the formation of the partnership to maintain an informal structure. There were long discussions to determine if the partnership was an "alliance," a "consortium," or an "association." By the end of year two, members agreed that each partner institution would be represented with one vote, and the partnership would be considered an alliance, and the group representing the institutions would be referred to as the "AgNIC Alliance Coordinating Committee."

After more than two years of attempts to discuss issues and develop policy without measurable results, and a fast-growing membership of more than 20 institutions, the partners decided to create an "AgNIC Executive Board." This board would be elected from and by the coordinating committee. The Board examines and proposes solutions to issues, drafts policy and planning documents, proposes policy for approval by the membership, and visions for the future of AgNIC.

The AgNIC Executive Board includes the past Chair, Chair, incoming Chair, three member-at-large positions, and an ex-Officio position reserved for the AgNIC Coordinator from NAL, and one NAL representative.
