= United States National Agricultural Library =

Agricultural research library

U.S. National Agricultural Library

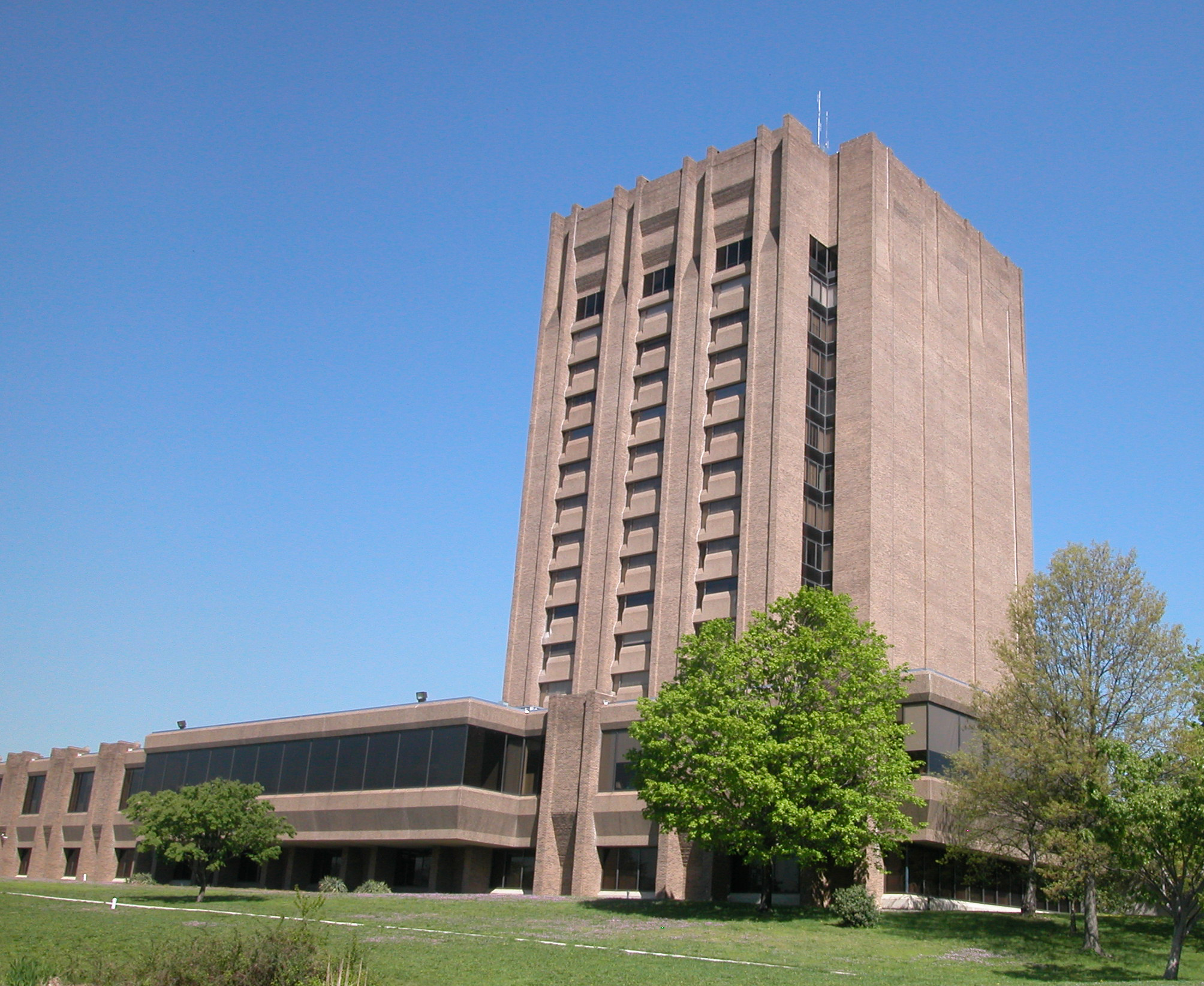
- Exterior of the NAL's Abraham Lincoln Building
- 39°1′23″N 76°55′17.5″W
- Location: Beltsville, Maryland
- Type: National library
- Established: 1862; 164 years ago
- Reference to legal mandate: Organic Act (May 15, 1862)
- Service area: Washington, D.C. metropolitan area
- Branches: 1 (Washington, D.C.)

Collection
- Size: c. 4 million

Other information
- Budget: c. US$30 million (FY 2023)
- Director: Paul M. Wester Jr.
- Employees: 215
- Parent organization: United States Department of Agriculture
- Website: www.nal.usda.gov

The United States National Agricultural Library (NAL) is one of the world's largest agricultural research libraries, and serves as a national library of the United States and as the library of the United States Department of Agriculture. Located in Beltsville, Maryland, it is one of five national libraries of the United States (along with the Library of Congress, the National Library of Medicine, the National Transportation Library, and the National Library of Education). It is also the coordinator for the Agriculture Network Information Center (AgNIC), a national network of state land-grant institutions and coordinator for the U.S. Department of Agriculture (USDA) field libraries.

NAL was established on May 15, 1862, by the signing of the Organic Act by Abraham Lincoln. It served as a departmental library until 1962, when the Secretary of Agriculture officially designated it as the National Agricultural Library. The first librarian, appointed in 1867, was Aaron B. Grosh, one of the founders of the National Grange of the Order of Patrons of Husbandry.

== History ==
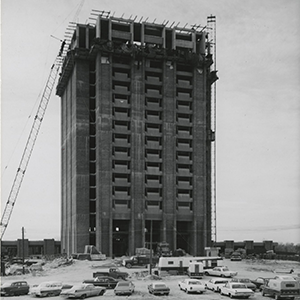
Construction of NAL's Abraham Lincoln Building

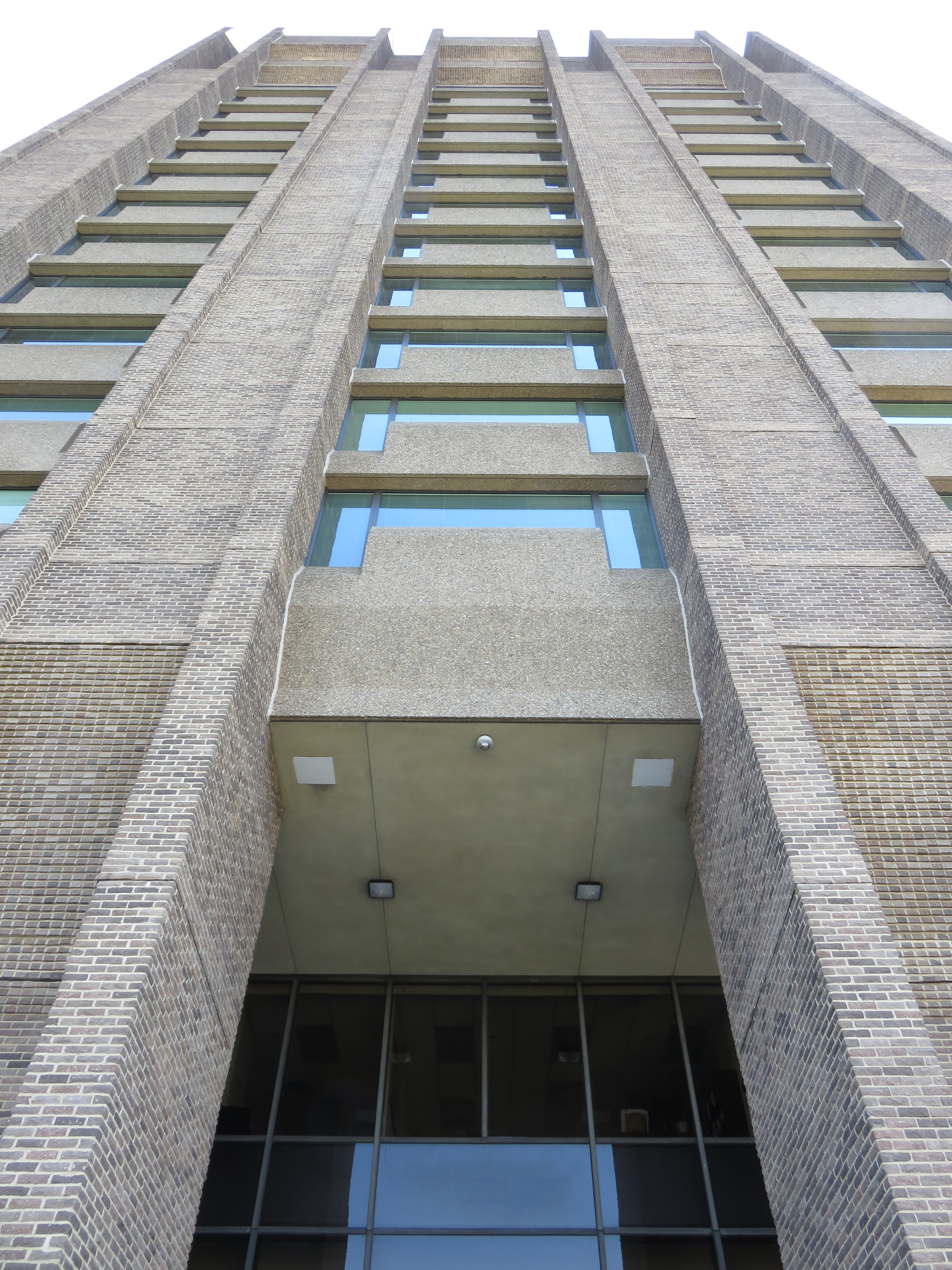
Façade of the Abraham Lincoln Building

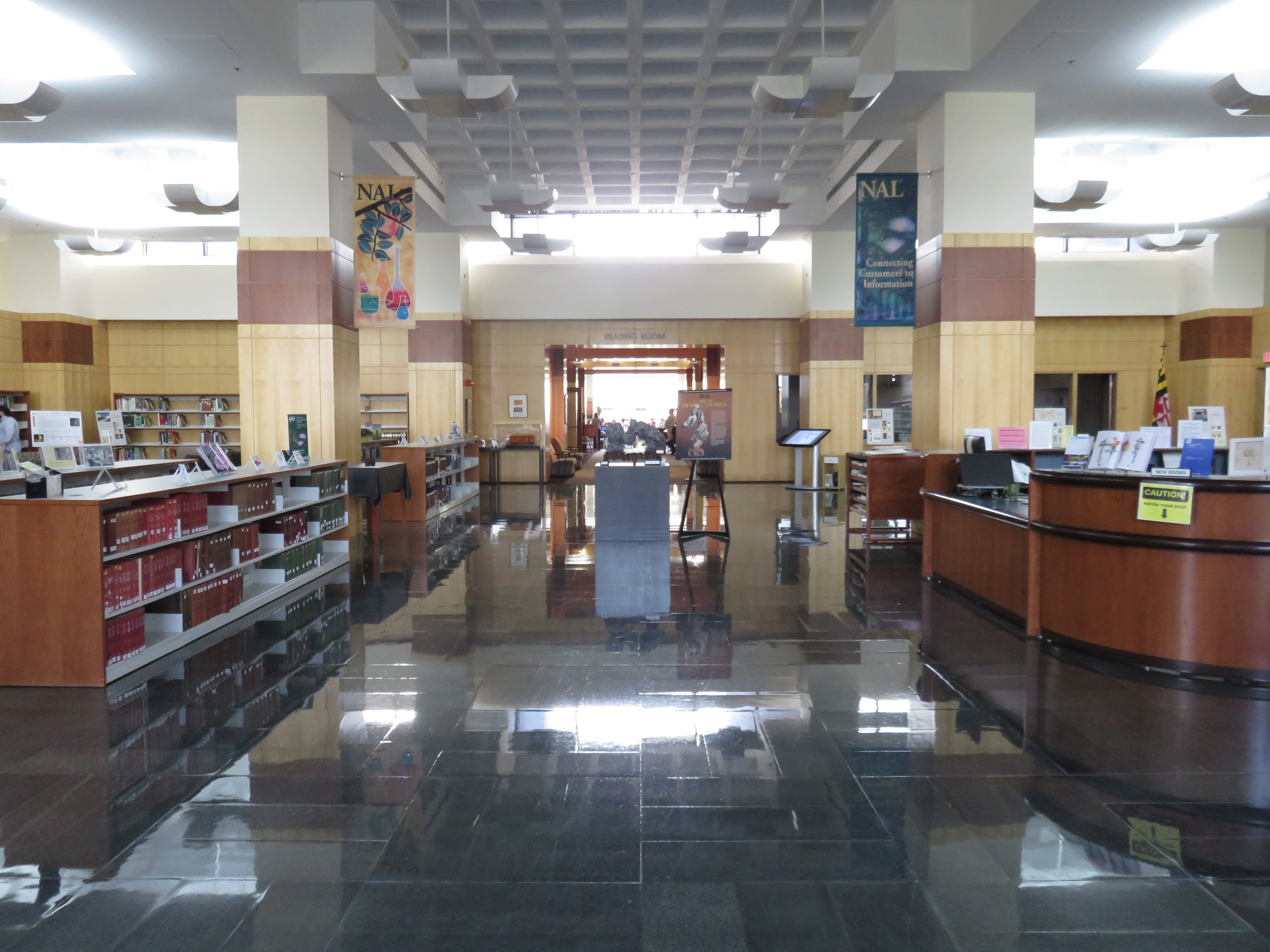
Lobby of the Abraham Lincoln Building

NAL was established as the U.S. Department of Agriculture Library on May 15, 1862, by the signing of the Organic Act by Abraham Lincoln. In 1863, the library's collection comprised 1,000 volumes that had been transferred from the U.S. Patent Office's Agricultural Division. By 1889, the library's collection had increased to 20,000 volumes, and a librarian from Amherst College was hired to create a classification system for the library's collection. At this time, the library was located on the second floor of the Department of Agriculture's main building. In 1893, William Cutter was hired as Librarian of the Department, and he began a reorganization effort to modernize the library and improve its effectiveness. His primary achievement was consolidating the library's collection of 38,000 volumes into one central library; previously, more than half of the library's collection was held in divisional libraries across the United States. By 1900, the library's collection contained 68,000 volumes, and in 1915, the library was moved to a larger facility in the Bieber Office Building at 1358 B Street SW, Washington, DC. The library moved again in 1932 to facilities in the USDA's South Building on Independence Avenue.

In 1934, the collection reached 250,000 volumes in size, and the library began participating in the Bibliofilm Service, which, along with the American Documentation Institute and the Science Service, supplied microfilm copies of articles to scientists. This was the first large-scale attempt by a library to provide copies of library materials to patrons rather than the original documents, and during its first year, over 300,000 copies were distributed.

During World War II, the Department of Agriculture underwent reorganization to address wartime needs. The library, which had been decentralized since 1920, was consolidated into a central facility under the direction of Department Librarian Ralph R. Shaw.

On May 23, 1962, the 100th anniversary of the library's establishment, Secretary of Agriculture Orville Freeman officially designated the library as the National Agricultural Library, making it the third national library in the United States. In 1964, funds were appropriated by Congress to begin planning for a new library facility in Beltsville, Maryland, on the grounds of the Beltsville Agricultural Research Center. Construction on the new facility began in 1965, and it first opened in 1969. In 2000, Secretary of Agriculture Dan Glickman designated the building as the Abraham Lincoln Building.

=== Librarians of the Department of Agriculture ===
- Aaron B. Grosh (1867–1869)
- Stuart Eldridge (1869–1871)
- John B. Russell (1871–1877)
- Ernestine H. Stevens (1877–1893)
- William P. Cutter (1893–1901)
- Josephine Clark (1901–1907)
- Claribel Barnett (1907–1940)
- Ralph R. Shaw (1940–1954)
- Foster E. Mohrhardt (1954–1968)
- John Sherrod (1968–1973)
- Richard Farley (1973–1983)
- Joseph Howard (1983–1994)
- Pamela Q.J. Andre (1994–2002)
- Peter Young (2002–2008)
- Simon Y. Liu (2010–2014)
- Paul M. Wester Jr. (2015–2024)

== Facilities ==
The main library is housed in the Abraham Lincoln Building, a seventeen-story facility on the grounds of the Henry A. Wallace Beltsville Agricultural Research Center in Beltsville, Maryland. NAL also used to operate a Washington, D.C., branch known as the DC Reference Center, which was located in the USDA's South Building.

=== Paul L. Byrne Agricultural Teaching and Research Center ===
The Paul L. Byrne Agricultural Teaching and Research Center is located at California State University, Chico and is part of the 800-acre Paul L. Byrne Memorial University Farm.

== Services ==
=== PubAg ===
PubAg is a search engine that gives the public enhanced access to research published by U.S. Department of Agriculture (USDA) scientists, and also to agriculturally relevant citations from the scientific literature. At its launch on January 13, 2015, PubAg made over 40,000 publications by USDA scientists available, and provided access to an additional 300,000 citations.

=== Ag Data Commons ===
Ag Data Commons is a repository and catalog for scientific datasets that are associated with publications by the USDA's agricultural research service and other institutions. The data included is funded by the USDA, either in whole or in part.

=== LCA Commons ===
Hosted by the National Agricultural Library, the U.S. Life Cycle Assessment Commons (LCA Commons) is a collaboration among federal agencies, private industry, and academic researchers. The intention of LCA Commons is to aggregate and archive life cycle inventory data that represent US economic activities, making it freely available for re-use. It is geared for use in LCAs, supporting policy assessment, decision-making in technology implementation, and public disclosure of comparative product or technology assertions.

=== i5K Workspace @ NAL ===
The i5k Workspace@NAL provides genome projects resulting from the i5k initiative with a space to display and share genome assemblies and gene models. In particular, the Workspace is geared towards research groups that do not have the resources to display the genome assembly and its features.

=== AGRICOLA ===
NAL maintains AGRICOLA (AGRICultural OnLine Access), the largest bibliographic database of agricultural literature in the world. It contains more than 4.1 million records for publications dating as far back as the 15th century. 78 percent of the records are for journal articles and book chapters, while 22 percent cover full-length books, journals, maps, electronic resources, and audiovisual materials. The database indexes publications from many disciplines related to agriculture, including veterinary sciences, entomology, forestry, aquaculture and fisheries, economics, food and human nutrition, and environmental sciences.

AGRICOLA originated in 1942 as the Bibliography of Agriculture, a printed index of article citation records. It was first digitized in 1970, when records were placed on magnetic tapes rather than reproducing them manually. The name was changed to AGRICOLA at this time, and the records were made available through database vendors such as Dialog and OCLC. In 1998, it became available to the general public for free on the World Wide Web.

=== National Agricultural Library Special Collections ===
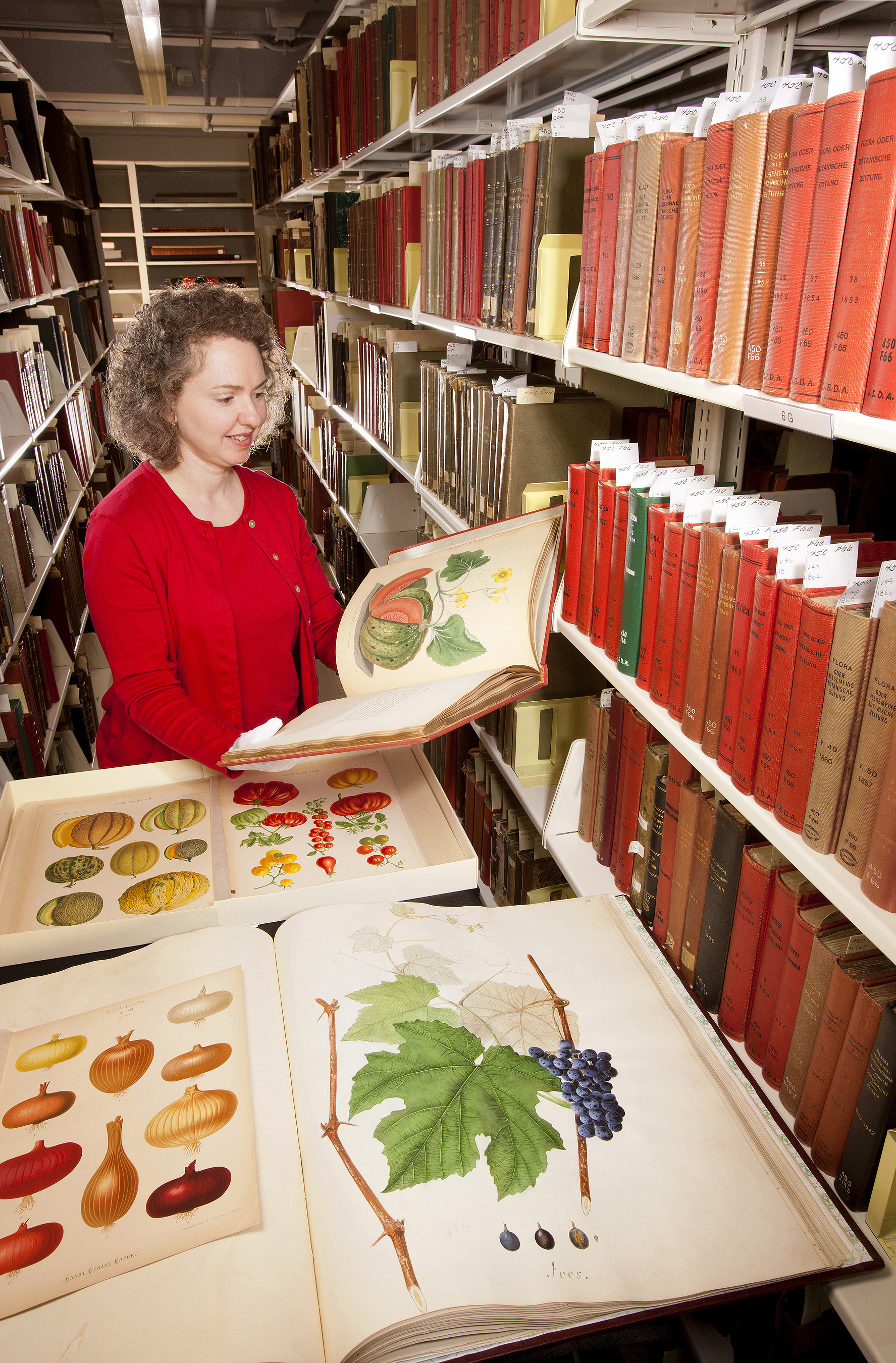
Special Collections librarian selecting fruit and vegetable images from the Rare Book Collection at the National Agricultural Library

The library's Special Collections houses rare materials related to the history of agriculture, including books, manuscripts, paintings and drawings, seed catalogs, agricultural photographs, and posters from the 1500s to the present. The subjects covered include horticulture, entomology, poultry sciences, and natural history.

==== Pomological Watercolor Collection ====
Within the Special Collections, the Pomological Watercolor Collection holds over 7,500 original watercolors on botanical subjects created by USDA artists between 1886 and 1942, almost half of which are apples. It is a unique resource documenting new introductions of fruit and nut cultivars as well as specimens discovered by USDA's plant explorers, representing 38 plant families in all. Some of these watercolors were published in the Yearbook of the United States Department of Agriculture in the 1902–1913 period, but many were never published at all.

Some 65 different artists are represented in the collection, of whom one-third were women. Just 9 of the 65 are responsible for more than 90% of the total: Deborah Griscom Passmore (over 1500 watercolors), Amanda Newton (over 1200), Mary Daisy Arnold, (over 1000), Royal Charles Steadman (over 850), J. Marion Shull (over 750), Ellen Isham Schutt (over 700), Bertha Heiges (over 600), Elsie E. Lower (over 250), and William Henry Prestele (over 100). Many of the pictures in the Pomological Watercolor Collection are available online through the library's Digital Repository (see link below).

=== National Agricultural Library Digital Repository ===
The NAL Digital Repository, created in April 2006, serves as a digital archive of historical USDA documents. The repository contains over 600,000 pages of digitized texts. Publications contained in the repository include the issues of the Journal of Agricultural Research from 1913–1949 and the archives of the Yearbook of the United States Department of Agriculture dating back to 1894.

=== Information Centers ===
NAL also houses several specialized information centers, which provide access to comprehensive and essential information resources focusing on the specific aspects of agricultural subjects. In addition to the general reference services available at NAL, each center offers Internet access to resources enhancing information availability and dissemination. The centers have staff available to serve customers on-site as well as by phone, fax or email. The Information Centers at the National Agricultural Library include:

- Alternative Farming Systems Information Center
- Animal Welfare Information Center
- Food and Nutrition Information Center
  - Nutrition.gov
- Food Safety Research Information Office Center
- National Invasive Species Information Center
- Rural Information Center
- Water and Agriculture Information Center

==== Animal Welfare Information Center ====
The Animal Welfare Information Center (AWIC) is a centralized resource of information products, services, and activities that provide information on animal welfare in research, teaching, testing, and exhibition as specified by the Improved Standards for Laboratory Animals Act of 1985. The 1985 Act was an amendment to the Animal Welfare Act of 1966 (AWA), and mandated an information service at the NAL to provide information on employee training, preventing duplication of animal experiments, and improving animal experimentation methods by reducing or replacing animal use and minimizing animals' pain and distress. The center later became known as AWIC in 1986.

The AWIC provides educational outreach through its website, free in-person and virtual workshops and trainings, the USDA NAL Twitter feed, and monthly newsletters. Outreach topics focus on the AWA and its amendments, the Three Rs principles (reduction, replacement, and refinement of animal use), and alternatives literature searching. This information is available to the public, but is specifically targeted towards scientists, veterinarians, animal care staff, librarians, and students. AWIC also provides free literature searching services upon request.

AWIC supports the research community by assisting with their alternatives literature search, which is one way it meets the AWA requirement to consider alternatives. Scientists working with animals are required to provide their institution's Institutional Animal Care and Use Committees (IACUCs) with documentation demonstrating that alternatives to painful or distressful procedures were considered and that experiments are not unnecessarily duplicative. These literature searches help identify 3Rs alternative methods to and within animal experimentation.

==== Food Safety Research Information Office Center ====
The Food Safety Research Information Office (FSRIO) collects, organizes, and disseminates food safety information in accordance with the Agricultural Research, Extension, and Education Reform Act of 1998. The Act mandated that the U.S. Department of Agriculture (USDA) establish an office to collect and maintain information on food safety studies to prevent duplicative research projects and to assist the government and private research organizations in determining research priorities. The National Agricultural Library formally launched the office on July 2, 2001.

FSRIO's mission also includes disseminating information to the general public on publicly funded (including university investigations) and, as much as possible, privately funded research initiatives. The office assists the Federal Government and private research entities with assessing food safety research needs; while also supporting the research community through organizing, collecting, and disseminating food safety research information. FSRIO also makes food safety investigations conducted through the Agricultural Research Service and from across other U.S. Department of Agriculture agencies available to researchers as well as projects from the Food and Drug Administration and the National Institutes of Health.

FSRIO maintains a searchable database on more than 1,700 food safety research products dating from 1996 to the present. The collection is indexed using the National Agricultural Library Thesaurus (NALT). The Thesaurus and its glossary are online vocabulary tools of agricultural and related terms in English and Spanish cooperatively produced through NAL, USDA, the Inter-American Institute for Cooperation on Agriculture, and other Latin American agricultural institutions in the Agriculture Information and Documentation Service of the Americas (SIDALC). In 2016, FSRIO created a repository of "Meet the Expert" videos that include content from a variety of sources. The videos highlight the latest food safety research applications conducted at USDA and other federal agencies.

==== Food and Nutrition Information Center ====
In 1971, the Food and Nutrition Information Center (FNIC) was established as a national repository of training and educational materials for the staff of USDA's Child Nutrition Programs (e.g. school lunch programs). The Food and Agriculture Act of 1977 furthered the mission of FNIC also to be a resource for state education agencies and interested members of the general public. FNIC covers topics related to dietary guidelines and supplements, and food composition. It also maintains a database of extensive food, nutrition, and related topics and resource lists. Currently, the FNIC website contains links to over 2,500 current and reliable resources on nutrition and is regularly updated by a staff of registered dietitians.

FNIC offers a Dietary Reference Intakes (DRIs) (established Health and Medicine Division of the National Academies of Sciences, Engineering and Medicine) calculator for daily nutrient recommendations, healthy recipes, educational materials, professional resources, food labeling information, and consumer food safety information, among other resources. In 2019, FNIC expanded their Spanish language website, "En Español" which offers over forty web pages translated into Spanish. With the 2020 coronavirus pandemic, FNIC expanded the site to offer a recipe page with recipes from both Federal and Cooperative Extension sites; the recipe library is updated regularly.

==== Nutrition.gov ====
Nutrition.gov is a USDA-sponsored website created and maintained by the Food and Nutrition Information Center. The website receives content guidance from a USDA working group of scientific experts in food and nutrition and the U.S. Department of Health and Human Services (HHS). Launched in 2004, Nutrition.gov is a part of the USDA's Obesity Intervention Plan and is funded by the Research, Education and Economics (REE) mission area of USDA. Nutrition.gov provides consumers with access to up-to-date, reliable information about food, healthy eating, food safety, and physical activity.
