= Josephine Adelaide Clark =

American botanist and librarian (1856–1929)

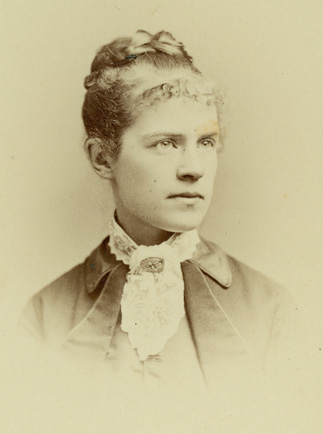
- Born: March 9, 1856; Weston, Massachusetts
- Died: March 24, 1929; Claremont, California

Josephine Adelaide Clark (9 March 1856 – 24 March 1929) was an American teacher, librarian, and botanist. She was the head librarian of the United States Department of Agriculture from 1901 to 1907. Clark was a part of the second class to graduate from Smith College in 1880 and she conceived the idea of publishing a card index of new genera and species of American plants, which was continued at the Gray Herbarium.

== Biography ==
Josephine Adelaide Clark was born on 9 March 1856 to John and Caroline (Derby) Clark in Weston, Massachusetts. She graduated from Waltham High School in 1873, and continued to teach there after graduation. In the fall of 1876 she began attending Smith College and earned her Bachelor of Arts in 1880. After graduation, she taught until 1888 when she began attending the Columbia College School of Library Economy in New York City for library science.

After graduation, Clark became the assistant librarian at the Gray Herbarium at Harvard University. She became the Botanical Bibliographer for the Division of Botany at the U.S. Department of Agriculture in 1891 and quickly became the Assistant Librarian for the whole department.

While working at the U.S. Department of Agriculture, she first compiled the index currently known as the Gray Herbarium Card Index which was the first available to botanists in a card format and published at regular intervals. The index was first published in catalog format in 1891 and compiled in a card format in 1894. The card format enabled the botanist to order alphabetically, systematic groups or geographical groups. Clark was the main organizer of the index until 1903 when she turned it over to Mary Anna Day at the Gray Herbarium with 27,999 cards.

From 1901 to 1907 she was head librarian for the U.S. Department of Agriculture before returning to Smith College as librarian, a position she held until 1919.

She died of pneumonia on March 24, 1929, in Claremont, California. Her papers are held by Smith College.

== Publications ==
- "North American Phanerogams and Pteridophytes" (1891)
- "Systematic And Alphabetic Index Of New Species Of North American Phanerogams And Pteridophytes," Contributions from the United States National Herbarium. Department of Botany, Smithsonian Institution (1892)
- "Reference list of publications relating to edible and poisonous mushrooms" (1898)
- A Bird Tablet for Field Use (1898)

The standard author abbreviation J.A.Clark is used to indicate this person as the author when citing a botanical name.
